= List of Brick Gothic buildings =

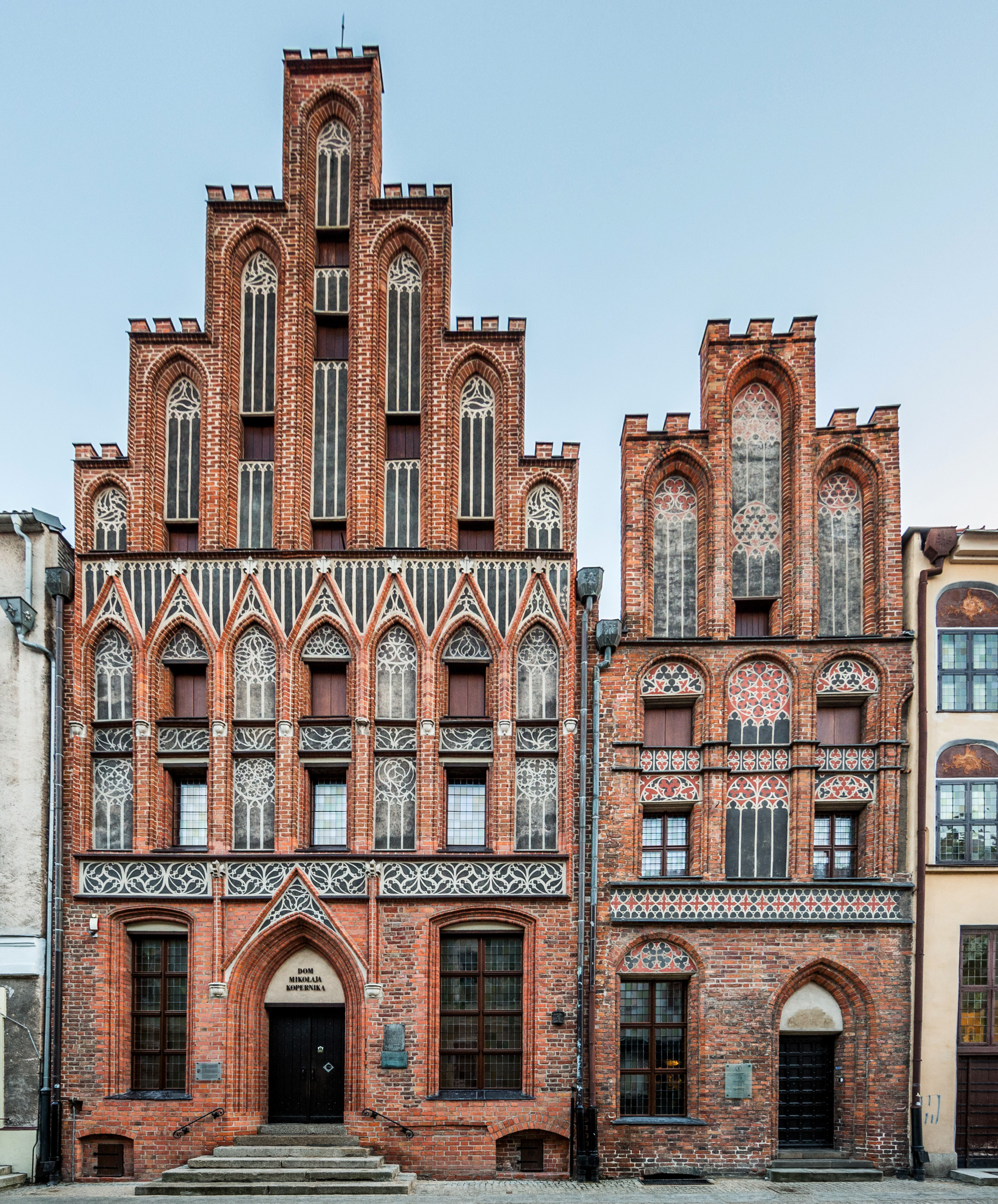
Copernicus' House in Toruń, Poland

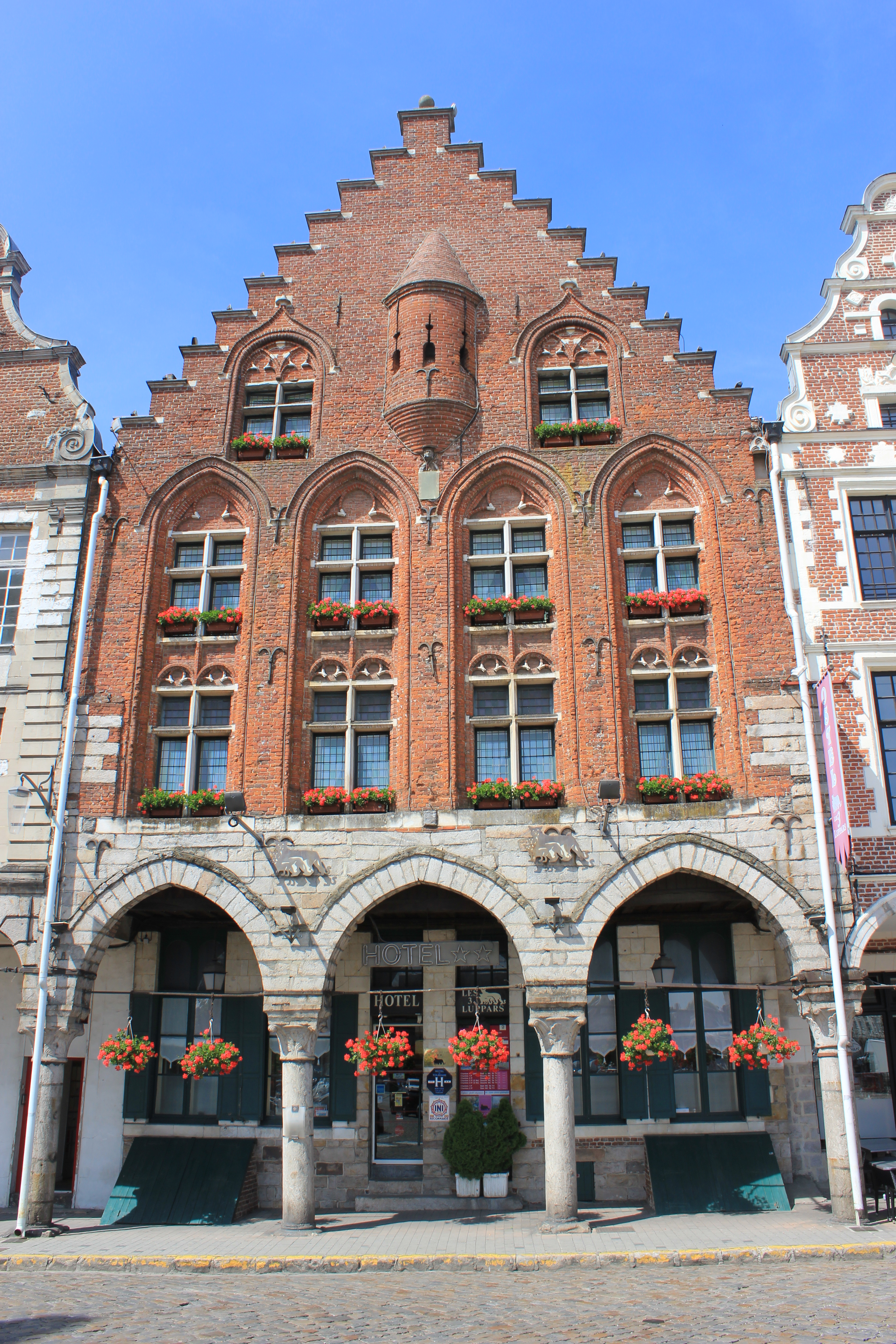
"House of the three Lepards" in Arras, northern France

The term Brick Gothic is used for what more specifically is called Baltic Brick Gothic or North German Brick Gothic. That part of Gothic architecture, widespread in Northern Germany, Denmark, Poland and the Baltic states, is commonly identified with the sphere of influence of the Hanseatic League. But there is a continuous mega-region of Gothic brick architecture, or Brick Gothic in a sense based on the facts, from the Strait of Dover to Finland and Lake Peipus and to the Sub-Carpathian region of southeastern Poland and southwestern Ukraine.

Out of northern Germany and the Baltic region, the term Brick Gothic is adequately applied as well.

The region around the Baltic Sea, including Northern Germany, has some typical characteristics, but there are also regional and social differences, such as between the churches of medieval big cities and those of the neighbouring villages. On the other hand, a significant number of Gothic brick buildings erected near the Baltic Sea could also have been built in the Netherlands or in Flanders, and vice versa.

Furthermore, Gothic brick structures have also been erected in other regions, such as northern Italy, southwestern and central France, and in the Danubian area of southern Germany. The particular architectural styles of some regions differ very much from the others, these are Italian Gothic (with Lombard Gothic, Venetian Gothic and Tuscan Gothic), French Gothique Méridional. Quite late began the medieval use of brick in England, with the Tudor Style.

The true extent of northern Brick Gothic and other Gothic brick architecture is shown by this almost complete list.

== Lists ==
This list will never be complete. But it aims to be almost complete to give an unbiased survey as well on the variance as on the geography of Gothic brick buildings.

The dates given here refer to the present extant Gothic structures. Predecessors or post-Gothic alterations are not normally mentioned, but can be assessed by following up the literature. The most influential structures are indicated by bold print. Romanesque and Renaissance structures are not listed. Gothic Brick structures from outside the Baltic or North German regions, e.g. the Danubian ones, are also included, while Neogothic edifices are not listed.

Navigation: BELA • BEL • CZ • DK • ENG • EST • FIN • FRA • GER • HUNG • ITA • LAT • LIT • NL • POL • RUS • SK • SWE • SWI • UKR

– In long tables, vertical arrows link to the navigation boards above (after the preceding table) and below (before the next table). –

=== Belarus ===
| Place | Building | Time of construction | Notes | Image |
|---|---|---|---|---|
| Hniezna | Church of Saint Michael | 1524–1527 | tower old, nave rebuilt in Gothic Revival style | |
| Kreva | Kreva Castle | Early 14th century | boulders with partial skin of bricks | |
| Lida | Lida Castle | 14th century | stone with brick superstructure | |
| Kamyenyets | Tower | 1276–1289 | border stronghold, one of the earliest brick constructions in the region | |
| Mir | Mir Castle | Late 15th to early 16th | UNESCO World Heritage Site. Major Renaissance alterations | |
| Synkavichy | St. Michael | 16th century | fortified church | |

Navigation: BELA • BEL • CZ • DK • ENG • EST • FIN • FRA • GER • HUNG • ITA • LAT • LIT • NL • POL • RUS • SK • SWE • SWI • UKR

=== Belgium ===
Public database links:

- IBE = Inventaris Bouwkundig Erfgoed (Inventory of Architectural Heritage)

Most of the Gothic brick architecture in Belgium can be found in West Flanders, some in a narrow strip along the border with the Netherlands. Many Gothic brick churches in the province of Limburg have been lost in the 19th century, as they were displaced by Gothic Revival churches.

Provinces of Belgium : West Flanders • East Flanders • Prov. of Antwerp • Limburg (BE) • Flemish & Walloon Brabant, Brussels

==== West Flanders ====
Bruges (Brugge) • Damme • Poperinge • Veurne

| ↕ | Place | Building | time of construction | Notes | Image |
|---|---|---|---|---|---|
| ↓ | Bruges | Belfry and halls | brick end 13th – end 15th century | | |
| ↑ | Bruges | Old St. John's Hospital | Gothic sick-halls 2nd half of 13th century, Cornelius Chapel 15th century | | |
| ↓ | Bruges | Church of Our Lady | brick tower since 1270 | | |
| ↑ | Bruges | St. Salvator's Cathedral | Choir since 1275, transept since 1360, present nave & aisles 1481–1557: | | |
| ↓ | Bruges | Various houses of citizens | | | |
| ↑ | Damme | Town hall | 1464–1467 | façade to the market place of stone (Brabantine Gothic) | |
| ↓ | Damme | Onze-Lieve-Vrouw-Hemelvaartkerk | | Gothic & Baroque | |
| ↑ | Damme | Huyse de Grote Sterre | 15th century | older core | |
| ↓ | Diksmuide | Belfort | | | |
| ↓ | Koksijde | Ten Duinen Abbey | founded 1107, nave of the church 1354 | Gothic parts of brick with some ashley; destroyed in end 16th century, archeological excavations since 1897 | |
| ↑ | Koolkerke | St Nicholas church | 14th century aisleless first brick church, after destruction in 16th century, in 16th/17th centuries rebuilt as a hall church; pale grey brick | | |
| ↓ | Poperinge | Sint-Bertinuskerk | 15th century | hall church | |
| ↑ | Poperinge | Sint-Jankerk | 13th–15th century | stabilized and a bit altered in the 19th century | |
| ↓ | Poperinge | Onze-Lieve-Vrouwkerk | end 13th to 14th encenturies | hall church | |
| ↑ | Roeselare | Sint-Michielkerk | 1502 | Late Gothic hall church | |
| ↓ | Roeselare-Oekene | Sint-Martinuskerk | | tower 15th century, nave 17th century, extended in 1895 | |
| ↑ | near Roeselare | Rumbeke Castle | | Gothic, Renaissance & Baroque | |
| ↑ | Steenkerke | Sint-Laurentiuskerk | | | |
| ↑ | Veurne | Sint-Niklaaskerk | 13th–15th century | | |
| ↑ | Veurne | Sint-Walburgakerk | choir 14th century | choir Early Gothic, rest Gothic Revival | |
| ↑ | Veurne | House "De Valk" ("Falcon") | 1st quarter of 17th century | very late Gothic | |
| ↑ | Ypres | St Martin's Cathedral | choir since 1221, transept since 1254; 14th century nave & aisles, tower 1377 and 143–1470 | most of the walls of brick, but a lot of stone tracery; was a cathedral 1561 to 1801 | |
| ↑ | Zuienkerke | Sint-Michielskerk | | | |

West Flanders ⬆ : Bruges (Brugge) • Damme • Poperinge • Veurne

Provinces of Belgium : West Flanders • East Flanders • Prov. of Antwerp • Limburg (BE) • Flemish & Walloon Brabant, Brussels

==== East Flanders ====
| ↕ | Place | Building | time of construction | Notes | Image |
|---|---|---|---|---|---|
| ↓ | Aalst | St Martin's Church | 1480–1566 | parts of the southern façade | |
| ↓ | Assenede | Sint-Pieter en Sint-Martinuskerk | | oldest parts Romanesque, northern aisle new | |
| ↓ | Dendermonde | St-Odolf-Chapel | 1328 | later alterations | |
| ↑ | Ghent-Ekkergem | St. Martin's Church | brick 1502–1527 | alterations by restorations of 1584–1618 and 1903–1907 | |
| ↓ | Maldegem | St-Barbarakerk | | crossing tower & choir | |
| ↑ | Moerbeke | Church of Abbot St-Anthony (kerk Sint Antonius Abt) | 14th–15th century | | |
| ↑ | Ophasselt, Geraardsbergen | Sint-Pieters-Bandenkerk | tower 15th century | nave 1777 | |
| ↑ | Schendelbeke (Geraardsbergen) | Sint-Amanduskerk | | first mentioned in 1139, transept and lower parts of the tower Gothic and of brick, alterations in 1669 and 19th century | |
| ↑ | Stekene | Heilig Kruiskerk | choir & transept 1548 | Gothic Revival nave 1897 | |
| ↑ | Wachtebeke | Sint-Catharinakerk | about 1200 & 1550–1580 | originally aisleless, later enlarged to be a hallchurch | |
| | Watervliet, Belgium | Onze-Lieve-Vrouw Hemelvaartkerk | about 1500 | most of the simple walls of red brick, all complicated parts of stone | |

Provinces of Belgium : West Flanders • East Flanders • Prov. of Antwerp • Limburg (BE) • Flemish & Walloon Brabant, Brussels

==== Province of Antwerp ====
| ↕ | Place | Building | time of construction | Notes | Image |
|---|---|---|---|---|---|
| ↓ | Antwerp | former St-Julian's Hospital (Sint-Julianusgasthuis | | | |
| ↓ | Antwerp | Vleeshuis | 1501-1504 | | |
| ↓ | Balen | Sint-Andrieskerk | | | |
| ↓ | Deurne | with proviso: Sint-Fredeganduskerk | 1603–1644 | After-Gothic reconstruction on the foundations of the predecessor, built about 1500 and destroyed in 1579 | |
| ↑ | Herentals | Begijnhofkerk Sint-Catharina | 1614 | | |
| ↓ | Herenthout | Begijnhofkerk Sint-Catharina | 1550 | alterations in 1774 | |
| ↑ | Hoogstraten | St. Catherine's Church | 1525–1550 | | |
| ↓ | Meerle, Hoogstraten | Sint-Salvatorkerk | 1st half of 15th – 1st half of 16th century | | |
| ↑ | Minderhout, Hoogstraten | Sint-Clemenskerk | choir 1550 | alterations 1773 | |
| ↓ | Kasterlee | Sint-Willibrorduskerk | | tower old, nave Gothic Revival | |
| ↑ | Mechelen | Hof van Kamerijk/Palais Margaretha van York | late 15th century | only lateral gables of brick | |
| ↓ | Mechelen | Hof Van Nassau | late 15th century | | |
| ↑ | Mechelen | "Het Paradijs" | | citizen's house | |
| ↓ | Mechelen | Cellenbroedersklooster | | ancient monastery, afterwards part of a beginage | |
| ↑ | Mechelen | Jesus Gate | | entrance of a beginage | |

==== Limburg ====
| ↕ | Place | Building | time of construction | Notes | Image |
|---|---|---|---|---|---|
| ↓ | Bocholt | Sint-Laurenskerk | | only the nave | |
| ↓ | Meeuwen | Sint-Martinuskerk | | | |
| ↓ | Peer | Sint-Trudokerk | | only the tower of brick | |

Provinces of Belgium : West Flanders • East Flanders • Prov. of Antwerp • Limburg (BE) • Hainaut • Flemish & Walloon Brabant, Brussels

==== Hainaut ====
| Place | Building | time of construction | Notes | Image |
|---|---|---|---|---|
| Battignies (Binche) | Saint-Anne's Chapel | about 1600 | very late Gothic | |
| Fontaine-l'Évêque | St Christopher church | | simple areas of the walls of the nave of brick | |
| Enghien | St. Nicholas Church | 14th century | | |
| Marcq, Enghien | St-Martin Church, Marcq | 15th century | consecrated in 1347, present building 15th century | |

==== Flemish Brabant, Walloon Brabant & Brussels ====
| Place | Building | time of construction | Notes | Image |
|---|---|---|---|---|
| Brussels | Coudenberg Palace | completed in 1451, burnt in 1731 | underground relics and archeological findings, the basement and some vaults were of brick | |
| Itterbeek, Dilbeek | Saint Anna's Church | Gothic 16th century | Walls of the aisles with layers of brick, other parts stone only; Romanesque parts mid-13th century | |
| Wavre | Saint-Jean-Baptiste Church | Gothic 16th century | nave and base of the tower of red stone, tower of red brick with narrow layers of white stone | |

Provinces of Belgium ⬆ : West Flanders • East Flanders • Prov. of Antwerp • Limburg (BE) • Hainaut • Flemish & Walloon Brabant, Brussels

Navigation: BELA • BEL • CZ • DK • ENG • EST • FIN • FRA • GER • HUNG • ITA • LAT • LIT • NL • POL • RUS • SK • SWE • SWI • UKR

=== Czech Republic ===
| ↕ | Place | Building | Time of construction | Notes | Image |
|---|---|---|---|---|---|
| | Brno | Basilica of the Assumption of Our Lady | 1323–1334 | intignated by Queen Elizabeth Richeza | |
| | Hradec Kralové | Cathedral of the Holy Spirit | 1339–1479 | built in three periods | |
| | Nymburk | Saint Giles Church, Nymburk | 14th century – about 1500 | later alterations by repairing damages of several wars | |
| | Opava | Co-Cathedral of the Assumption of the Virgin Mary | 1237 – 14th century | | |
| | Opava | Holy Cross Chapel | 1394 | only the choir of brick | |
| | Prague | Convent of Saint Agnes | 13th century | conventual building | |
| | Prague | Old New Synagogue | 1270 | upper gable | |
| | Prague | Karolinum | | originally a private palace, now a central building of Charles University | |
| | Prague | U pěti korun (House of the Five Crowns) | | relic of the original Gothic decoration of a nowadays Renaissance & Baroque building | |

Navigation: BELA • BEL • CZ • DK • ENG • EST • FIN • FRA • GER • HUNG • ITA • LAT • LIT • NL • POL • RUS • SK • SWE • SWI • UKR

=== Denmark ===
Background informations:

- NM-DK = Digitized pages, available on the websites of the National Museum, of the compendium of Danmarks Kirker ("Churches of Denmark"). It has been published since 1927, but the digitized pages mostly are of editions of the 1990s. On the linked subpage, you have to cklick for a PDF with the title "... Kirke". The description you load down begins with some history. After that, the churchyard is described and after the churchyard, mostly beginning with the headline "BYGNING", the church building itself. In this list, sometimes simply is written "PDF", sometimes an identification of the volume and the number "BYGNING"-page.
- Trap = Statistik-Topographisk Beskrivelse af Kongeriket Danmark (Statistical-Topographical Description of the Kingdom of Denmark, initiated by Jens Peter Trap and continued by H. Weitemeyer, V. Falbe-Hansen & H. Westergaard. The 1st edition 1856–1860, 2nd edition 1872–1879 & 3rd edition 1898–1906 are available on Runeberg edition of Nordic literature. As a non-commercial volunteer project providing original texts, it can be considered equivalent to Wikisource.

Denmark: North Jutland • Mid Jutland • South Jutland • Funen • Zealand • Lolland & Falster

==== North Jutland ====
– Danish "Region Nordjylland" –

Jutland : Aalborg • Brønderslev Kom. • Frederikshavn Kom. • Hjørring + Kom. • Jammerbugt Kom. • Mariager + Kom. • Mors Island • Thisted + Kom. • Vesthimmerlands Kom. • Ribe/Esbjerg Kom. • Viborg

| ↕ | Place | Building | time of construction | Notes | Image |
|---|---|---|---|---|---|
| ↓ | Aalborg | Budolfi Church | about 1450 | northern chapel and 14 meters of the choir 1942–1944 | |
| ↓ | Aalborg | Hospital of the Holy Ghost | this wing 1506 | | |
| ↓ | Bislev, Aalborg Kommune | Bislev church | | Romanesque nave of granite, white washed Gothic tower of brick | |
| ↑ | Ferslev, Aalborg Kommune | Ferslev church | | Romanesque nave of granite, white washed Gothic tower of brick | |
| ↓ | Frejlev, Aalborg Kommune | Frejlev kirke | nave 12th century | Romanesque nave of granite, white washed Gothic tower of brick | |
| ↑ | Hals, Aalborg Kommune | Hals church | | choir Late Gothic, tower Late Gothic & later heightened | |
| ↓ | with proviso for lacking data: Klarup, Aalborg Kommune | Klarup church | | | |
| ↑ | Nibe, Aalborg Kommune | Nibe church | 15th century | | |
| ↓ | Nørre Tranders, Aalborg Kommune | Nørre Tranders church | | granite & brick | |
| ↑ | Sejlflod, Aalborg Kommune | Sejlflod church | brick 16th century | | |
| ↓ | Storvorde, Aalborg Kommune | Storvorde church | 14th century or later | | |
| ↑ | Sønder Tranders, Aalborg Kommune | Sønder Tranders church | | tower & alterations of the nave Late Gothic of brick, washed | |
| ↓ | Sønderholm, Aalborg Kommune | Sønderholm church | | tower & porch LateGothic of brick, washed | |
| ↑ | Vester Hassing, Aalborg Kommune | Vester Hassing church | tower 15th century | | |
| ↓ | Tise, Brønderslev Kommune | Tise church | | Late Gothic enlargement and modernization | |
| ↑ | Tolstrup, Brønderslev Kommune | Tolstrup kirke | | porch Late Gothic, tower replaced in 1937 | |
| ↓ | near Voergaard Castle, Brønderslev Kommune | Voer kirke | | Late Gothic choir and porch; tower 1788 | |
| ↑ | Øster Brønderslev, Brønderslev Kommune | Øster Brønderslev Kirke | about 1250 | nave & base of the tower of granite, tower of red brick, porch of washed biick | |
| ↓ | Åsted, Frederikshavn Kommune | Åsted church | | brick on a base of granite: Romanesque nave, Gothic porch, Baroque eastern enlargements, tower of 1848 | |
| ↑ | Elling, Frederikshavn Kommune | Elling Kirke | 13th century | Romanesque & Gothic | |
| ↓ | Volstrup; Frederikshavn Kommune | Volstrup church | ca. 1600 | Late Romanesque (also brick) & Late Gothic; gables altered to Baroque style | |
| ↑ | Skagen, Frederikshavn Kommune | Sand-Covered Church | btw. 1355 & 1387 | nave demolished in 1895 | |
| ↓ | Hjørring | St Cathreine church | Gothic 15th century | choir, tower & other additions to the Romensque nave (years on the tower from renovations) | |
| ↑ | Skallerup, Hjørring Kommune | Skallerup church | | nave Romanesque, tower, sacristy & porch Late Gothic | |
| ↓ | Vrensted, Hjørring Kommune | Vrensted church | | Late Gothic whitened brick tower; Romanesque nave of granite | |
| ↑ | Vrå, Hjørring Kommune | Vrå church | | Romensque nave with Late Gothic painted brick tower & porch | |
| ↓ | Alstrup, Jammerbugt Kom. | Alstrup church | | choir & tower Late Gothic of brick, whitened | |
| ↑ | Brovst, Jammerbugt Kom. | Brovst Kirke | Gothic 14th century | tower & porch of brick | |
| ↓ | Gjøl, Jammerbugt Kom. | Gjøl church | nave 1150 | brick tower Gothic age | |
| ↑ | Haverslev, Jammerbugt Kom. | Haverslev church | | Gothic tower of Romanesque granite church, renovation 1757, poor chronicle information | |
| ↓ | Hune Sogn, Jammerbugt Kom. | Hune-/ Vor for Frue Kirke | | whitene Githic brick tower, Romanesque (?) nave of granite | |
| ↑ | Ingstrup Sogn, Jammerbugt Kom. | Ingstrup church | | nave with romanesque walls of granit eashley and gothic vaults, whitened Gothic brick tower | |
| ↓ | Pandrup; Jammerbugt Kom. | Jetsmark church | th century | before 1200 Romanesque nave granite walls, mid 15th century Late Gothic relaunch: brick tower, vauts, doors, frescos | |
| ↓ | Kettrup, Jammerbugt Kom. | Kettrup church | nave 12th century | tower and porch of brick in late Middle Age, renovation in 1801 | |
| ↑ | Klim, Jammerbugt Kom. | Klim church | nave 12th century | Romanesque granite church with Late Gothic whitened brick tower and further whitened brick additions | |
| ↓ | Fjerritslev, Jammerbugt Kom. | Kollerup church | Gothic about 1500 | Romanesque granite nave of 12th century | |
| ↑ | Lerup sogn, Jammerbugt Kom. | Lerup church | tower mid 15th century | Romanesque nave, Late Gothic whitened brick tower, younger porch | |
| ↓ | near Brovst, Jammerbugt Kom. | Torslev church | Romanesque nave, Late Gothic tower; upper storey of the tower demolished in 1841 | | |
| ↑ | Tranum Sogn, Jammerbugt Kom. | Tranum Kirke | Romanesque nave about 1200, Late Gothic tower about 1450 | | |
| ↓ | Vester Hjermitslev Sogn, Jammerbugt Kom. | Vester Hjermitslev church | Gothic about 1500 | tower & relaunch of the nave by brick, whitened | |
| ↑ | Vust, Jammerbugt Kom. | Vust church | tower about 1500 | Romanesque granite nave, Gothic whitened brick tower | |
| ↓ | Øland island, Jammerbugt Kom. | Øland- or Oxholm church | early 15th century | former nunnery church, yellow brick, nowadays white washed | |
| ↑ | Byrum, Læsø | Byrum church | 1258 | mainly Romanesque, but two Gothic windows and inside Gothic vaults | |
| ↓ | Vesterø, Læsø | Southern Vesterø church | about 1250 | mainly Romanesque, tower Gothic | |
| ↑ | Mariager, Mariagerfjiord Kom. | Mariager Abbey church | 15th century | former nunnery and pilgrimage | |
| ↓ | Als (by), Mariagerfjiord Kom. | Als church | 1309 | white washed | |
| ↑ | Astrup, Mariagerfjiord Kom. | Astrup church | 1542 | octagonal tower of red brick | |
| ↓ | Falslev-Vindblæs sogn, Mariagerfjiord Kom. | Falslev kirke | Romanesque nave of granite ashley, whitened brick tower & porch Late Gothic additions | | only granite photos |
| ↑ | Falslev-Vindblæs sogn, Mariagerfjiord Kom. | Vindblæs church | Brick about 1550 | Late Gothic tower and porch | |
| ↓ | Hvidberg, Mors island, Morsø Kommune | Hvidberg church | tower about 1500 | nave 12th century of granite ashley | |
| ↑ | Nykøbing Mors, Mors | Dueholm Priory | founded 1370 | | |
| ↓ | Sejerslev, Mors island, Morsø Kommune | church | | Romanesque granite church with Late Gothic whitened brick tower | |
| ↑ | Vejerslev, Mors island, Morsø Kommune | Vejerslev church | tower about 1400 | Romanesque granite church with Late Gothic whitened brick tower | |
| ↓ | Torup, Fjerritslev, Rebild Kommune | Torup kirke | tower about 1500 | Romanesque granite church with Late Gothic whitened brick tower; porch about 1900 | |
| ↑ | Thisted, Thisted Kommune | church | about 1500 | yellow munk brick with granite ashley and chalk, nowadays white washed | |
| ↓ | Bedsted, Thisted Kommune | Bedsted church | | Romanesque granite church with Late Gothic red brick tower, interior of the nave about 1500 | |
| ↑ | Hillerslev, Thisted Kommune | Hillerslev kirke | tower about 1500 | Romanesque granite church with Late Gothic whitened brick tower | |
| ↓ | 13 km NE of Thisted, Thisted Kommune | Hjardemål Kirke | Gothic 15th century | Romanesque granite church (about 1200) with Late Gothic whitened brick tower | |
| ↑ | Hunstrup, Thisted Kommune | Hunstrup kirke | Gothic about 1500 th century | Romanesque granite church with Late Gothic whitened brick tower and porch | |
| ↓ | Lild, Thisted Kommune | Lild kirke | about 1460 | munk brick & Bulbjerg stone | |
| ↑ | Lodbjerg Sogn, Thisted Kommune | Lodbjerg church | 1530s | | |
| ↓ | Ørum, Thisted Kommune | Ørum church | tower about 1500 | Late Gothic red brick tower, Romanesque granite nave & choir | |
| ↑ | Øsløs, Thisted Kommune | Øsløs Kirke | tower about 1500 | Romanesque granite nave & choir | |
| ↓ | Østerild, Thisted Kommune | Østerild Kirke | core about 1160 | Romanesque granite church with Late Gothic whitened brick tower | |
| ↑ | Sennels, Thisted Kommune | Sennels Kirke | | Romanesque granite church with Late Gothic whitened brick tower and porch | |
| ↓ | Sjørring, Thisted Kommune | Sjørring kirke | tower about 1500 | Romanesque granite church with Late Gothic whitened brick tower | |
| ↑ | Tømmerby, Thisted Kommune | Tømmerby kirke | nave about 1130, tower & porch late Middle Age of brick, whitened | | |
| ↓ | Vestervig, Thisted Kommune | Vestervig abbey church | Romanesque basilica of granite ashley, Late Gothic tower of brick | | |
| ↑ | Villerslev, Thisted Kommune | Villerslev kirke | | Romanesque granite church with Late Gothic whitened brick tower | |
| ↓ | Farsø, Vesthimmerland | Farsø church | nave & choir about 1180, tower & porch Late Gothic of brick, whitened | | |
| ↑ | Gedsted, Vesthimmerland | Gedsted church | Brick 14th century | transept and tower of brick, partly whitened | |
| ↓ | Simested, Vesthimmerland | Simested church | brick 16th century | Romanesque nave of granite ashley 13th century | |
| ↑ | Skivum, Vesthimmerland | Skivum kirke | | Romanesque granite church with Gothic whitened brick tower | |
| ↑ | Vesterbølle, Vesthimmerland | Vesterbølle church | brick early 16th century | Romanesque granite church with Late Gothic whitened brick tower | |

North Jutland ⬆ : Aalborg • Brønderslev Kom. • Frederikshavn Kom. • Hjørring + Kom. • Jammerbugt Kom. • Mariager + Kom. • Mors Island • Thisted + Kom. • Vesthimmerlands Kom.

Denmark: North Jutland • Mid Jutland • South Jutland • Funen • Zealand • Lolland & Falster

==== Mid Jutland ====
– Danish "Region Midtjylland" –

Middle + South Jutland : Aarhus • Horsens • Viborg • Randers• Ribe/Esbjerg Kom.

| ↕ | Place | Building | time of construction | Notes | Image |
|---|---|---|---|---|---|
| ↑ | Aarhus, Aarhus Kommune | Cathedral | end of 14th century to 1500 | | |
| ↑ | Aarhus, Aarhus Kommune | Church of Our Lady | mid-13th century to 1500 | | |
| ↓ | Framlev Sogn, Aarhus Kommune | Framlev church | Romanesque nave of boulders & trachyte, Late Gothic tower of brick | | |
| ↑ | Kasted Sogn, Aarhus Kommune | Kasted church | brick about 1500 | Romanesque granite church with Late Gothic brick tower & porch; upper storey of the tower replaced in 1935 | |
| ↓ | Kolt Sogn, Aarhus Kommune | Kolt Church | | Romanesque granite church with Late Gothic brick porch & tower, all white painted | |
| ↑ | Lisbjerg Sogn, Aarhus Kommune | Lisbjerg church | | Romanesque granite church with Late Gothic brick porch & tower, all white painted | |
| ↓ | MårsletSogn, Aarhus Kommune | Mårslet church | brick about 1500 | Romanesque granite church with Late Gothic brick porch & tower, all white painted | |
| ↑ | Ormslev Sogn, Aarhus Kommune | Ormslev church | tower 16th century | Romanesque granite church with Late Gothic brick enlargement, porch & tower, all white painted | |
| ↓ | Skødstrup Sogn, Aarhus Kommune | Skødstrup church | Romanesque nave of stone, Late Gothic tower, porch and enlargement of the nave by brick, nowadays all brick painted white | | |
| ↑ | Spørring Sogn, Aarhus Kommune | Spørring church | brick about 1500 | Gothic tower & porch of a Romanesque church of natural stone | |
| ↓ | Sønder Aarslev Sogn, Aarhus Kommune | Sønder Aarslev Church | late Middle Age | enlargements by brick | |
| ↑ | Tilst Sogn, Aarhus Kommune | Tilst Church | tower Late Gothic | | |
| ↓ | Blegind, Skanderborg Kommune | Blegind Kirke | | Late Gothic tower of brick, white washed nave of granite and other stone | |
| ↑ | Foldby Sogn, Favrskov Kommune | Foldby church | Romanesque granite church with Gothic brick vaulting & tower; the only church in Favrskov Kommune, whose brick additions are in Gothic style; since 12th century ruled by Aarhus cathedral chapter | | |
| ↑ | Grinderslev, Skive Kommune | Grinderslev Kirke | Late Middle Age tower with basket arched windows at a Romanesque church of granite ashlar | | |
| ↑ | Daugård, Hedensted Kommune | Daugård church | | white painted Romanesque trachyte church with Late Gothic brick tower, porch and alterations | |
| ↑ | Løsning-Korning Sogn, Hedensted Kommune | Korning kirke | | white painted Romanesque trachyte church with Late Gothic brick tower | |
| ↓ | Ølsted Sogn, Hedensted Kommune | Ølsted church | tower 15th century | originally Romanesque nave with a Gothic tower of yellow brick, altered in 17th century | |
| ↑ | Øster Snede sogn, Hedensted Kommune | Øster Snede kirke, | tower 15th century | white painted brick tower; Romanesque nave with Gothic alterations | |
| ↓ | Horsens, eastern coast | Church of Our Saviour (Vor Frelsers Kirke) | 1225 | Romanesque & Gothic | |
| ↑ | Horsens, eastern coast | Horsens Abbey church | 1261–1275 | | |
| ↓ | Lundum Sogn, Horsens Kommune | Lundum kirke | | Late Middle Age tower and alterations of brick | |
| ↑ | Ørridslev, Horsens Kommune | Ørridslev church, | brick about 1500 | Gothic porch and white painted tower | |
| ↓ | Tyrsted, Horsens Kommune | Tyrsted kirke | | Gothic brick tower, white painted Romanesque nave | |
| ↑ | Yding Sogn, Horsens Kommune | Yding church, | white painted Gothic brick tower, Neo-Romanesque nave | | |
| ↑ | Grenaa, Norddjurs Kommune | St Gertrude church | 14th century | Present-day outer appearance dominated by Gothic Revival additions of 1870 | |
| ↓ | Ålsø Sogn, Norddjurs Kommune | Ålsø kirke | tower 1450 | nowadays white painted | |
| ↑ | Fausing, Norddjurs Kommune | Fausing church | | Late Gothic porch of brick | |
| ↓ | Ginnerup, Norddjurs Kommune | Ginnerup kirke | brick 14th century | Gothic tower, porch and choir | |
| ↑ | Gjerrild Sogn, Norddjurs Kommune | Gjerrild kirke | Gothic tower & porch mainly of brick | | |
| ↓ | Gjesing Sogn, Norddjurs Kommune | Gjesing kirke | | vaults of the nave, choir, tower of brick | |
| ↑ | Glesborg, Norddjurs Kommune | Glesborg Kirke | | Romanesque granite church with Late Gothic whitened brick tower | |
| ↓ | Holbæk Sogn, Norddjurs Kommune | Holbæk kirke | Late Middle Age porch of brikc and tower of granite & brick | | |
| ↑ | Homå Sogn, Norddjurs Kommune | Homå kirke | brick Late Gothic | Romanesque granite building partly replaced by Late Gothic | |
| ↓ | Karlby, Norddjurs Kommune | Karlby kirke | | Late Gothic stilt tower of brick, white painted | |
| ↑ | Ørsted Sogn, Norddjurs Kommune | Ørsted kirke | late Middle Age | tower of ganite ashley and big brick | |
| ↓ | Ørum, Norddjurs Kommune | Ørum Church | sacristy (2nd half of 15th century) and tower (1510s) of brick | | |
| ↑ | Veggerslev, Norddjurs Kommune | Veggerslev kirke | | Late Gothic tower & porch of brick | |
| ↓ | Vejlby, Norddjurs Kommune | Vejlby Kirke | | Late Gothic tower and porch of brick | |
| ↑ | Villersø Sogn, Norddjurs Kommune | Villersø kirke | tower (upper part) & porch (plastered) of brick | | |
| ↓ | Vivild Sogn, Norddjurs Kommune | Vivild kirke | tower & porch late Middle Age of brick | | |
| ↑ | Voer Sogn, Norddjurs Kommune | Voer kirke | | stilt tower of big red brick – nowadays white painted | |
| ↓ | Voldby, Norddjurs Kommune | Voldby kirke | brick since 13th century, 14th-century tower, white painted | | |
| ↑ | Nørre Snede, Ikast-Brande Kom. | Nørre Snede Kirke | upper storeys of the white painted Late Gothic tower of brick | | |
| ↓ | Odder, Odder Kommune | Odder church, | Romanesque nave & choir of granite ashley, white painted Late Gothic tower of brick | | |
| ↑ | Bjerager Sogn, Odder Kommune | Bjerager church, | | Gothic porch of brick and boulders | |
| ↓ | Falling Sogn, Odder Kommune | Falling church, | tower 2nd half of 14th century, mainly brick, white painted | | |
| ↑ | Gosmer Sogn, Odder Kommune | Gosmer church | | late Middle Age tower of brick, painted white | |
| ↓ | Hundslund Sogn, Odder Kommune | Hundslund kirke | brick early 16th century | Romanesque choir & nave of granite ashley, upper parts of the white painted Gothic tower of brick | |
| ↑ | Tunø, Odder Kommune | Tunø church, | about 1300 | Gothic brick gables; tower nowadays serving as a light house | |
| ↑ | Ringkøbing, Ringkøbing-Skjern | Ringkøbing church | 15th century & 1550 | round bows, but no Renaissance elements | |
| ↓ | Brejning Sogn, Ringkøbing-Skjern | Brejning church | | Romanesque granite church with Late Gothic white painted brick tower and porch | |
| ↑ | Dejbjerg Sogn, Ringkøbing-Skjern | Dejbjerg church | | Romanesque granite church with Late Gothic white painted brick tower and porch | |
| ↓ | Nørre Omme Sogn, Ringkøbing-Skjern | Nørre Omme kirke | | Romanesque granite church with Late Gothic white painted brick tower | |
| ↑ | Rindum, Ringkøbing-Skjern | Rindum church | 12th century | Romanesque granite church with Late Gothic white painted brick tower and porch | |
| ↓ | Randers | St Martin's Church | 1490–1520 | former abbey church | |
| ↑ | Randers | Holy Ghost Hospital (Helligåndshuset) | 1434 | | |
| ↓ | Ålum sogn, Randers Kommune | Ålum church | late 16th century | Romanesque nave with gothic alterartions, tower in Gothic-Renaissance transitional style | |
| ↑ | Albæk Sogn, Randers Kommune | Albæk Kirke | tower & porch ≈1450 | nave & choir late 11th century of chalk ashley | |
| ↓ | Borup, Randers Kommune | Borupchurch | | Romanesque granite church with Late Gothic brick tower and some later additions | |
| ↑ | Dalbyneder, Randers Kommune | Dalbyneder church | boulders about 1150 | boulders & white washed brick | |
| ↓ | Dalbyover, Randers Kommune | Dalbyove church | Romanesque granite church with Late Gothic brick tower, much of the outer skin of the tower renewed in 1891 | | |
| ↑ | Fårup Sogn, Randers Kommune | Fårup church | | Romanesque granite church with Late Gothic brick porch, white washed | |
| ↓ | Gassum Sogn, Randers Kommune | Gassum church | | Romanesque granite church with Late Gothic brick tower, white washed | |
| ↑ | Hald Sogn, Randers Kommune | Hald church | | Romanesque granite church with Late Gothic whitened brick tower, porch & sacristy | |
| ↓ | Harridslev sogn, Randers Kommune | Harridslev kirke | whitened Romanesque granite church with Late Gothic brick tower & porch | | |
| ↑ | Hørning sogn, Randers Kommune | Hørning church | | Romanesque granite church with Late Gothic brick tower & transept, Baroque western gate | |
| ↓ | Lem sogn, Randers Kommune | Lem kirke | | Romanesque granite church with Late Gothic partly whitened brick tower, tower renovated in 1760 & 1901 | |
| ↑ | Nørbæk Sogn, Randers Kommune | Nørbæk church | | Romanesque granite church with Late Gothic whitened brick tower | |
| ↓ | Ørum Sogn, Randers Kommune | Ørum church | | Romanesque granite church with Late Gothic brick porch | |
| ↑ | Råby, Randers Kommune | Råby Kirke | porch 16th century | porch of alternant belts of red & yellow brick, tower probably also of brick, but painted | |
| ↓ | Råsted, Randers Kommune | Råsted church | | whitened Romanesque granite church with Late Gothic brick tower | |
| ↑ | 500 m from the coast north of Randers | Sødring kirke | 15th century | white painted red brick | |
| ↓ | Tånum sogn, Randers Kommune | Tånum church | | Romanesque granite church with Late Gothic brick tower and white painted porch | |
| ↑ | Udbyneder, Randers Kommune | Udbyneder church | | all of brick: late Romanesque nave & choir and Gothic tower | |
| ↓ | Besser Sogn, Samsø | Besser Kirke, | mid 13th century | all of brick | |
| ↑ | Kolby, Samsø | Kolby Kirke, | mid 13th century | all of brick | |
| ↓ | Nordby, Samsø | Nordby church, | early 12th to 15th century | several additions | |
| ↑ | Onsbjerg Sogn, Samsø | Onsbjerg Kirke | mid 13th century | choir 15th century, tower 1st half of 16th, all of brick | |
| ↓ | Tranebjerg Sogn, Samsø | Tranebjerg church, | 3rd Q 13th to mid 16th century | several enlargements | |
| ↑ | Skivholme, Skanderborg Kommune | Skivholme church | | late medieval tower and porch of brick, Romanesque choir & nave | |
| ↓ | Fousing Sogn, Struer Kommune | Fousing church, | brick: porch about 1500, tower about 1550 | | |
| ↓ | Hvidbjerg Sogn, Struer Kommune | Hvidbjerg church, | brick about 1500 | Romanesque granits church with Late Gothic tower & transept | |
| ↑ | Rønde, Syddjurs Kommune | Bregnet church, | 2nd half of 15th century | | |
| ↓ | Dråby, Syddjurs Kommune | Dråby church | 1200–1400 | | |
| ↓ | Feldballe Sogn, Syddjurs Kommune | Feldballe church, | brick late Middle Age | Late gothic tower & porch | |
| ↑ | Koed Sogn, Syddjurs Kommune | Koed Kirke | brick late Middle Age | tower and vaults of the choir Gothic | |
| ↓ | Lime, Syddjurs Kommune | Lime church, | | late Middle Age porch of brick | |
| ↑ | W of Ryomgård, Syddjurs Kommune | Mary Magdalene church | 1425–58 | | |
| ↓ | Mørke Sogn, Syddjurs Kommune | Mørke church, | brick: porch since 13th, tower 14th century, unpainted | | |
| ↑ | Nimtofte, Syddjurs Kommune | Nimtofte kirke | | brick, nowadays painted: Late Gothic stilt tower, porch and modernizations of the nave | |
| ↓ | Thorsager, Syddjurs Kommune | Thorsager Church | Late Middle Age | porch of the Romanesque round brick church | |
| ↑ | Tirstrup, Ebeltoft, Syddjurs Kommune | Tirstrup church | since 1465 | replacing a Romanesque predecessor, white painted | |
| ↓ | Tvilum, Silkeborg Kommune | Tvilum Kirke | 13th century | | |
| ↑ | Viborg | Domprovstegården | | Cathedral dean's residence | |
| ↑ | Viborg | Gråbrødreklosteret (Greyfriars Convent) | 13th century | altered since 1545 | |
| ↑ | Viborg | Villadsens Gård | 1530 | enlarged in 1643 | |

North + Mid Jutland ⬆ : Aalborg • Brønderslev Kom. • Frederikshavn Kom. • Hjørring • Jammerbugt Kom. • Mariager • Mors Island • Thisted • Vesthimmerlands Kom. • Aarhus • Horsens • Randers • Viborg • Ribe/Esbjerg Kom.

Denmark: North Jutland • Mid Jutland • South Jutland • Funen • Zealand • Lolland & Falster

==== South Jutland ====
– Jutland part of Danish Region "Region Syddanmark";
that is much more than traditional "Sønderjylland" –

Ribe/Esbjerg Kom.

| ↕ | Place | Building | time of construction | Notes | Image |
|---|---|---|---|---|---|
| ↓ | Grindsted, Billund Kommune | Grindsted Kirke, | core & tower Romanesque 12th century, 15th century or about 1500 porch & enlargement of the nave by brick, white washed | | |
| ↓ | Haderslev | Cathedral | mid 14th century to 1440 | | |
| ↓ | Kolding | Koldinghus | 13th century | since 1808 in ruins for more than a century | |
| ↓ | Nybøl, Sønderborg Kommune | Nybøl Kirke | brick 1582 | very late Gothic prolongation and modernization of a Romanesque 12th-century church, white washed | |
| ↑ | Ribe, Esbjerg Kommune, western coast | Cathedral | until 1250 Romanesque stone, since 1283 Gothic brick | Romanesque, since 1100 of tufa, sandstone and granite; Citizens' Tower and chapels (later lateral naves) of brick | |
| ↓ | Ribe, Esbjerg Kommune, western coast | Old town hall | about 1450 | | |
| ↑ | Ribe, Esbjerg Kommune, western coast | St. Catherine's Priory | founded 1228 | | |
| ↓ | Seem near Ribe, Esbjerg Kommune | Seem Kirke | since about 1200 | Gothic western portal, generally Romanesque | |
| ↑ | Esbjerg Kommune | Vester Vedsted Kirke | about 1300 | Romanesque nave partly of brick, Gothic choir of brick, all washed | |
| ↑ | Tønder, southwestern Jutland | Kristkirke | 1591/1592 | one of the few initially Protestant Gothic churches | |

Jutland ⬆ : Aalborg • Brønderslev Kom. • Frederikshavn Kom. • Hjørring + Kom. • Jammerbugt Kom. • Mariager + Kom. • Mors Island • Thisted + Kom. • Vesthimmerlands Kom. • Aarhus • Horsens • Randers • Viborg • Ribe/Esbjerg Kom.

Denmark: North Jutland • Mid Jutland • South Jutland • Funen • Zealand • Lolland & Falster

==== Funen ====
and adjacent islands

| ↕ | Place | Building | time of construction | Notes | Image |
|---|---|---|---|---|---|
| ↓ | Assens | Church of Our Lady (Vor Frue Kirke) | finished in 1488 | | |
| ↓ | Assens Kommune, near Little Belt | Hårby church | 13th century ? | many boulders, few brick, washed or even plastered | |
| ↓ | Assens Kommune | Søllested Kirke | | founded about 1100 | |
| ↑ | Ærø | Bregninge Kirke in Ærø | | , Romanesque & Gothic, nave mainly of boulders, white washed | |
| ↓ | Faaborg | Holy Ghost church | 1477–1525 | washed | |
| ↑ | Faaborg-Midtfyn Kommune | Egeskov Castle | completed in 1554 | outside Late Gothic, inside Renaissance | |
| ↓ | Kerteminde, eastern coast | St Lawrence church | 16th century | | |
| ↑ | Rønninge, Kerteminde Kommune | Rønninge Kirke | | founded about 1100 | |
| ↑ | Odense | Saint Canute's Cathedral | | | |
| ↑ | Odense Kommune | Fraugde Kirke | mentioned 1239 | brick, stone and alternating layers | |
| | Allesø Sogn, Odense Kommune | Allesø Kirke | | | |
| ↑ | Otterup Kommune | Bederslev church | | | |

Denmark: North Jutland • Mid Jutland • South Jutland • Funen • Zealand • Lolland & Falster

==== Zealand ====
and adjacent islands

Faxe • Helsingør • Møn • Næstved • Odsherred Kom. • Roskilde • Stevns Kom.

| ↕ | Place | Building | Time of construction | Notes | Image |
|---|---|---|---|---|---|
| ↓ | Albertslund, Capital Region | Herstedøster Church | sinds 1200 | tower of brick, plastered nave of boulders | |
| ↓ | Albertslund, Capital Region | Herstedvester Church | 13th century | porch & upper tower of brick, nave of stone; alterations in 19th century | |
| ↓ | Blovstrød Sogn, Allerød Kommune, Capital Region | Blovstrød Kirke | | | |
| ↑ | Allerød Kommune | Lillerød Church | founded about 1100 | Romaesque stone building enlarged by brick | |
| ↓ | Ballerup, Capital Region | Ballerup Kirke | | | |
| ↑ | Brøndby, near Copenhagen | West Brøndby Church | Gothic 15th century | begun in 12th century | |
| ↓ | Brøndby, near Copenhagen | East Brøndby church | nave of stone about 1150 | only tower Brick Gothic | |
| ↓ | Faxe | Faxe Church | 15th century | | |
| ↑ | Haslev, Faxe Kommune | Haslev Church | 1370 | first stone church about 1100 | |
| ↓ | Faxe Kommune | Karise Kirke | 1261 | | |
| ↑ | Faxe Kommune | Roholte Church | 1441 | royal pessession until 1677 | |
| ↓ | Faxe Kommune | Teestrup Kirke | | Late Romanesque nave, Late Gothic additions, washed | |
| ↑ | Fredensborg Kommune | Asminderød Church | | founded about 1100 as a round stone church | |
| ↓ | Frederiksborg | Oppe Sundby Kirke | Gothic about 1400 | boulders 11th century | |
| ↑ | Frederikssund Kommune, Capital Region | Frederikssund Kirke | about 1200 | Romanesque & early Gothic, eastern part rather of boulders | |
| ↓ | Frederikssund Kommune, NW of Copenhagen | Jørlunde church | 11th/12th/ ? century | brick gothic additions to Romanesque started building; Romanesque frescos | |
| ↑ | Frederikssund Kommune | Slangerup Church | tower begun 1411, nave built 1587–1588 | Gothic & Renaissance | |
| ↓ | Glostrup (also Kom.), Capital Region | Glostrup Kirke | | | |
| ↑ | Gribskov Kommune, Capital Region, north coast | Græsted Kirke | about 1200 | Romanesque & Gothic, much of the nave plastered | |
| ↓ | Gribskov Kommune | Helsinge Kirke | begun 12th century, tower 16th century | nave except of the window framings plastered | |
| ↑ | Gribskov Kommune | Søborg Kirke | 1140–end 13th century | begun in Romanesque style already by brick | |
| ↓ | Halsnæs Kommune, Capital Region, northern coast | Kregme Kirke | Romanesque of boulders 12th century, Gothic of brick 16th century | | |
| ↑ | Halsnæs Kommune, northern coast, Capital Region | Melby Kirke | Gothic 16th century | Romanesque coer of boulders since 1080 | |
| ↓ | Helsingør | Saint Olaf's Church | Gothic early 15th century | basilica, begun in Romanesque style already by brick about 1200 | |
| ↑ | Helsingør | Carmelite Priory with St Mary church | since 1430 | | |
| ↓ | Helsingør | Helsingør City Museum | since 1516 | former Carmelites' sailors' hospital | |
| ↑ | Hillerød, north of Copenhagen | Gørløse Kirke | Romanesque & Gothic, nave of boulders & brick since 1150 | | |
| ↓ | Hillerød Kommune | Nørre Herlev Kirke | 1450–1480 | | |
| ↑ | Høje-Taastrup Kommune, Capital Region | Upper Taastrup church | Gothic 1250–1400 | core 1050–1150 | |
| ↓ | Holbæk Kommune | Frydendal Kircke | | white washed, partly almost plastered | |
| ↑ | Holbæk | Jyderup Kirke | Gothic 15th century | | |
| ↓ | Copenhagen (København) | Former Nicholas church | since 13th century | after fire of 1795 reconstructed in early 20th century; lower parts of the tower original; nowadays a museum | |
| ↑ | Køge | St Nicholas church | 1250_1300 | | |
| ↓ | Lejre Kommune | Gershøj kirke | | red washed | |
| ↑ | Lejre Kommune | Glim Kirke | 13th century | | |
| ↓ | Møn Island, Vordingborg Kommune | Bogø Kirke | | white washed | |
| ↑ | Borre, Møn Island | Borre Kirke | | Romanesque & Gothic | |
| ↓ | Møn | Elmelunde Church | stone 1085 | brick & boulders, white washed | |
| ↑ | Møn | Fanefjord Church | | white washed | |
| ↓ | Møn, Vordingborg Kommune | Magleby Church | Gothic 15th/16th century | coer early 13th century | |
| ↑ | Næstved | St Martin's church | founded about 1220, tower 15th century | | |
| ↓ | Næstved | St. Peter's Church | 12th to 14th century | Built on the site of an earlier Romanesque church, the Gothic church has scarcely been altered since 1375. | |
| ↑ | Næstved | Old town hall | 15th century | | |
| ↓ | Glumsø, Næstved Kommune | Glumsø church | | | |
| ↑ | Næstved Kommune | Herlufmagle Kirke | 15th/16th century | alterations 1886 | |
| ↓ | Sjællands Odde, 'Odsherred Kommune, northern coast' | Odden Kirke | in stages 13th century – about 1400 | washeded; choir enlarged in 1820 | |
| ↑ | Odsherred Kommune | Grevinge Kirke, Roskilde Stift | stone about 1170 | lower & eastern parts of boulders & other granite | |
| ↓ | Nykøbing Zealand, Odsherred Kommune | Nykøbing church | Romanesque brick 1225, Gothic about 1400 | | |
| ↑ | Odsherred Kommune | Nørre Asmindrup Kirke | 12th century Romanesque | nave mainly of boulders, gables triangles of brick, plastered | |
| ↓ | Roskilde | Cathedral | 12th to 13th century | UNESCO World Heritage Site. Essentially Romanesque but incorporating Gothic features. Among earliest large-scale brick edifices in northern Europe. | |
| ↑ | Roskilde | St Jørgensbjerg Church | | begun 1080 as a building of boulders | |
| ↓ | Roskilde | St. Catherine's Priory, Roskilde | old parts 1565 | evangelical monastery since 1699 | |
| ↑ | Roskilde | Sankt Laurentii Church Tower | early 16th century | nave of 13th century demolished after Reformation | |
| ↓ | Roskilde Kommune | Gundsømagle Kirke | founded in 1100 | | |
| ↑ | Roskilde Kommune | Snoldelev Kirke | founded about 1100, nave begun Romanesque with Gohtiv alterations, choir and tower Gothic, brick & stone, white washed | | |
| ↓ | Rudersdal Kommune | Birkerød Church | | | |
| ↑ | Sneslev, Ringsted Kommune | Sneslev Kirke | 12th/13th century | Romanesque & Gothic, tower renaissance | |
| ↓ | Solrød Kommune | Havdrup Kirke | | yellow washed | |
| ↑ | Solrød Kommune | Jersie Kirke | 13th century | | |
| ↑ | Kirke Skensved, Solrød Kommune | Church of Kirke Skensved | nave 14th century, tower & porch 15th century, upper tower perhaps rebuilt after 1660 (Swedish Wars) | | |
| ↓ | Sorø Kommune | Vedbygård | 1429, 1540 | | |
| ↑ | Stevns Kommune, south of Copenhagen | Strøby Kirke | 13th century | brick and stone | |
| ↑ | Stevns Kommune | Tårnby Kirke | 1200 Romanesque, 1375 Gothic, 1500 porch | | |
| ↑ | Stevns Kommune | Valløby Kirke | Gothic 15th century | eastern part Romanesque with Renaissance gable, western part Gothic with brich tower | |
| ↑ | Greve Kommune, south of Copenhagen | Tune Kirke | 14th/15th century | predecessor 11th century | |

Zealand ⬆ : Faxe • Helsingør • Møn • Næstved • Odsherred Kom. • Roskilde • Stevns Kom.

Denmark: North Jutland • Mid Jutland • South Jutland • Funen • Zealand • Lolland & Falster

==== Lolland and Falster ====
| ↕ | Place | Building | time of construction | Notes | Image |
|---|---|---|---|---|---|
| ↓ | Store Avnede, near Nakskov, Lolland Kommune | Avnede Church | 14th century? | white washed; before the damming off of Nakskov Fjord near to the beach | |
| ↓ | Birket, northern Lolland Kommune | Birket Church | about 1350 | washed, Gothtic choir, oldest wooden bell tower of Denmark | |
| ↓ | southwestern Lolland Kommune | Gloslunde Church | 13th century | Romanesque with Gothic additions of porch, sacristy & vaults | |
| ↓ | Maribo, Lolland Kommune | Maribo Cathedral | 15th century | hall church, former nunnery | |
| ↑ | Nakskov, Lolland Kommune | St Nicholas church | 13th century & 1420–1654 | narrow but high Romanesque core, lengthened and widened by low Gothic nave & aisles, forming a basilica in the west and a low hall church in the east; predecessor of about 1000 | |
| ↓ | Nørreballe, NW of Maribo, Lolland Kommune | Østofte Church | 14th century | | |
| ↑ | SW of Nakskov, Lolland Kommune | Vestenskov Kirke | about 1250 | | |
| ↑ | 4 km ESE of Maribo, Lolland island, but Guldborgsund Kom. | Engestofte kirke | | High Gothic, white washed | |
| ↓ | S of Sakskøbing, Lolland, Guldborgsund Kom. | Fjelde Kirke | tower 15th century | nave romanesque | |
| ↑ | Lolland, Guldborgsund Kom. | Kettinge Kirke | 13th century | | |
| ↓ | Lolland, Guldborgsund Kom. | Majbølle Kirke | 1250–1300 | | |
| ↑ | Lolland, Guldborgsund Kom. | Nysted Kirke | about 1300 | | |
| ↓ | Lolland, Guldborgsund Kom. | Radsted Kirke | Romanesque about 1200, Gothic choir 14th, tower 15th century; Renaissance alterations | | |
| ↑ | Sakskøbing, Lolland, Guldborgsund Kom. | Sakskøbing Kirke | 1250–1300 | more Romanesque than Gothic details | |
| ↓ | S of Sakskøbing, Lolland, Guldborgsund Kom. | Slemminge Kirke | 13th century, tower later | two Romanesque & several Gothic arches | |
| ↑ | South of Maribo, Lolland, Guldborgsund Kom. | Vester Ulslev Kirke | nave before 1300 | Romanesque choir, gothicized Romanesque nave, Late Gothic tower | |
| ↑ | Falster Island, Guldborgsund Kom. | Eskilstrup Church | | Romanesque apse, Gothic tower, washed | |
| ↓ | northern Falster, Guldborgsund Kom. | Gundslev Kirke | | tower & choir partly Gothic | |
| ↑ | Falster, Guldborgsund Kom. | Kippinge Church | 13th century | | |
| ↓ | Falster, Guldborgsund Kom. | Nørre Alslev Church | 1308 | | |
| ↑ | northern Falster, Guldborgsund Kom. | Nørre Vedby Kirke | about 1300 | | |
| ↓ | northern Falster, Guldborgsund Kom. | Østofte Kirke.JPG | about 1250 | | |
| ↑ | northeastern Falster, Guldborgsund Kom. | Stubbekøbing Church | 13th & 15th century | Late Romanesque basiilical nave, Erly Gothic choir, Late Gothic tower, later alterations | |
| ↑ | east of Nykøbing, Falster, Guldborgsund Kom. | Sønder Alslev Kirke | | tower Gothic | |
| ↑ | SE of Nørre Alslev, Falster, Guldborgsund Kom. | Torkilstrup Church | tower 15th century | Romanesque nave of boulders, Gothic tower of brick | |
| ↑ | north of Nykøbing, Falster, Guldborgsund Kom. | Ønslev kirke | | choir and nave Early Gothic | |

Denmark ⬆ : North Jutland • Mid Jutland • South Jutland • Funen • Zealand • Lolland & Falster

Navigation: BELA • BEL • CZ • DK • ENG • EST • FIN • FRA • GER • HUNG • ITA • LAT • LIT • NL • POL • RUS • SK • SWE • SWI • UKR

=== England ===
In England, the use of bricks for pretentious buildings began later than in continental Europe. And the collective of Gothic brick buildings differs, almost no religious buildings and very few urban ones.

| ↕ | Place | Building | Time of construction | Notes | Image |
|---|---|---|---|---|---|
| ↓ | Barsham (Norfolk) | East Barsham Manor | | rebuilt in the 1920s and 1930s | |
| ↓ | Burnham-on-Crouch (Essex) | Creeksea Place | | Elizabethan architecture | |
| ↓ | Colchester (Essex) | Layer Marney Tower | 1520 | tallest Tudor gatehouse in Britain | |
| ↓ | Warwickshire | Compton Wynyates | 1481 | Tudor architecture | |
| ↑ | Guildford (Surrey) | Sutton Place | 1525 | Tudor architecture | |
| ↓ | near Henley-on-Thames (Oxfordshire) | Greys Court | | Elizabethan architecture, partly stone with layers of brick, partly brick | |
| ↑ | Richmond upon Thames (London) | Hampton Court Palace | 1497–1600 | Tudor style buildings for Giles Daubeney (part of Henry VIII's kitchen), Cardinal Wolsey (1516 Great Gatehouse, 1522 Clock Court), Henry VIII (since 1530), Elizabeth I (since 1547); later buildings in Baroque style | Great gatehouse |
| ↓ | City of Westminster (London) | St James's Palace | 1531–1536 | Tudor architecture | |
| ↑ | Manchester | Hough End Hall | | Elizabethan architecture | |
| ↓ | Morley Saint Peter (Norfolk) | Morley Old Hall | about 1600 | Tudor architecture | photo wanted |
| ↑ | north of Newbury (Berkshire) | Shaw House | | Elizabethan architecture | |
| ↓ | Oxborough (Norfolk) | Oxburgh Hall | | Elizabethan architecture | |
| ↑ | Prestbury (Cheshire) | Normans Hall | | partly timber-framed, partly brick | photo wanted |
| ↓ | Ramsbury (Wiltshire) | Littlecote House | | Elizabethan architecture, partly of bricks | |
| ↑ | Rochester (Kent) | Eastgate House | | Elizabethan architecture, partly brick, partly half-timbered | |
| ↓ | Sevenoaks District (Kent) | Otford Palace | 1537 | ruins | |
| ↑ | Shottesbrooke (Berkshire) | Shottesbrooke Park House | 16th century | Tudor architecture | |
| ↓ | near Tasburgh (Norfolk) | Rainthorpe Hall | | Elizabethan architecture | |
| ↑ | Cheshire West and Chester | Willaston Old Hall | | Elizabethan architecture | |
| ↓ | Whitchurch-on-Thames (Oxfordshire) | Hardwick House | before 1526 | Tudor architecture | |
| ↑ | Lincolnshire | Tattershall Castle | 1430-1450 | Brick castle with restored large tower | |
| ↑ | East Sussex | Herstmonceux Castle | mid 15th century | One of the oldest brick buildings in England | |
| ↑ | Woking (Surrey) | Woking Palace | 13th century & 1503 | ruins | |

Navigation: BELA • BEL • CZ • DK • ENG • EST • FIN • FRA • GER • HUNG • ITA • LAT • LIT • NL • POL • RUS • SK • SWE • SWI • UKR

=== Estonia ===
| Place | Building | Time of construction | Notes | Image |
|---|---|---|---|---|
| Laiuse Castle | | 13th – 14th centuries | partly brick surface on the walls of boulders; destroyed in 1559, afterwards partly rebuilt | |
| Põltsamaa | Põltsamaa Castle | | rests of Gothic façade decoration of btick; since 1750 converted into a Rococo palace; destroyed in 1941 | |
| Tartu | Cathedral | 13th – 15th centuries | Destroyed in Livonian War, east part of ruin now houses Tartu University Museum. Towers were originally 66 metres (217 feet) high (now 22 m or 72 ft). | |
| Tartu | St. John | early 14th century | Numerous terracotta sculptures inside and outside | |
| Vastseliina | Vastseliina Castle | 14th – 15th centuries | partly brick surface on the walls of boulders; rests of Gothic decoration of brick destroyed in 1702 | |
| Viljandi | Viljandi Castle | 13th – 14th centuries | | |

=== Finland ===
Navigation: BELA • BEL • CZ • DK • ENG • EST • FIN • FRA • GER • HUNG • ITA • LAT • LIT • NL • POL • RUS • SK • SWE • SWI • UKR

| Place | Building | Time of construction | Notes | Image |
|---|---|---|---|---|
| Espoo | Cathedral | 1485–1490, trancept 1821–1823 | Parts of brick Gothic | |
| Halikko | Halikko Church | 1460–1475, trancepts and portico 1812–1814 | Portico of brick Gothic | |
| Hämeenlinna | Häme Castle | 15th and 16th century, on earlier fieldstone foundations | Brick castle | |
| Hattula | Holy Cross Church | 1472–1490 | Northernmost Brick Gothic church | |
| Porvoo | Cathedral | 1440–1450 | | |
| Turku | Cathedral | Late 14th century to early 16th century, a brick gothic chapel 1655–1657 | | |
| Turku | Saint Mary's Church (Finnish: Maarian kirkko) | 1440–1460 | | |

Navigation: BELA • BEL • CZ • DK • ENG • EST • FIN • FRA • GER • HUNG • ITA • LAT • LIT • NL • POL • RUS • SK • SWE • SWI • UKR

=== France ===
Navigation: North • Alsace • Center • Burgundy/Bresse • Forez • South

==== Hauts-de-France with French Flanders ====
| ↕ | Department | Place | Building | Time of construction | Notes | Image |
|---|---|---|---|---|---|---|
| ↓ | Nord | Arnèke | Église Saint-Martin | | (images) | |
| | Nord | Bailleul, town hall | Belfry (images) | 15th century | destroyed in 1918, rebuilt a bit simpler in 1929 | |
| ↓ | Nord | Bailleul, town hall | Gothic hall | | survived the bombings of 1918 | |
| | Nord | Bambecque | St. Omer Church | | regional pale brick | |
| ↑ | Nord | Bergues | Belfry | 14th–16th century | destroyed in 1944, almost identically rebuilt in 1961 (images) | |
| | Nord | Bergues | Saint-Martin Church | | (images) | |
| ↓ | Nord | Blaringhem | Saint-Martin Church | | only the tower and parts of the nave are of bricks, pseudo-basilica | |
| ↑ | Nord | Bourbourg | Saint-John-Baptiste Church | | partly of bricks (images) | |
| ↓ | Nord | Brouckerque | Saint-Omer Church | | | |
| ↑ | Nord | Cappelle-Brouck | Church of St. James the Elder | | gray brick: parts of the building of brick, parts of stone and de mixed parts | |
| | Nord | Douai | Templer's House | founded in 1155 | changes in the 19th century | |
| ↓ | Nord | Douai | Our Lady's Church | 12th–15th centuries | shells of the vaults and part of the interior sides of the walls of brick; outside all is of sandstone | |
| | Nord | Dunkirk | Belfry | | (images) | |
| ↑ | Nord | Dunkirk | Church of Saint-Éloi | | (images) | |
| | Nord | Esquelbecq | Saint-Folquin Church | 13th–17th century | current decorative façade of 1610 (images) | |
| ↓ | Nord | Esquelbecq | Esquelbecq Castle | 12th century | altered by renovation since 1606 | |
| ↑ | Nord | Hazebrouck | Saint-Éloi Church | | (images) | |
| | Nord | Hondschoote | Saint Vaast Church | 15 century, tower 1513 | perhaps the most lovely brick church of French Flanders, famous "White Tower" at a relatively low hall church | |
| ↓ | Nord | Houtkerque | Église Saint-Antoine | | (images) | |
| ↑ | Nord | Killem | Village church | 16th & 17th centuries | | |
| | Nord | Lederzeele | Église de l'Assomption-de-Notre-Dame | | | |
| ↓ | Nord | Millam | Église Saint-Omer | 15th century | pale "sand brick" | |
| ↑ | Nord | Morbecque | Saint-Firmin Church | | | |
| ↓ | Nord | Noordpeene | | | Gothic steeple of yellow brick, rest Gothic revival of red brick | |
| ↑ | Nord | Oost-Cappel | Église Saint-Nicolas | | only northern aisle | |
| | Nord | Quaëdypre | Saint-Omer Church | | | |
| ↓ | Nord | Rexpoëde | Saint-Omer Church | | l'église est en partie gothique, mais le clocher et la flèche sont néogothiques (style néoflamand) | |
| ↑ | Nord | Rubrouck | D'Oude Hofstee (Flamish: The Old Manor/Farm) | | very rare example of Gothic Flamish vernacular architecture | |
| | Nord | Saint-Georges-sur-l'Aa | Saint-Georges Church | | | |
| ↓ | Nord | Saint-Jans-Cappel | Tower of St John Baptiste | 1557 | Gothic/Renaissance | |
| | Nord | Samer | Saint-Martin Church | | | |
| ↑ | Nord | Socx | Saint-Léger Church | | | |
| ↓ | Nord | Staple | Saint-Omer Church | | | |
| ↑ | Nord | Steenvoorde | Saint-Peter's Church | | | |
| | Nord | Valenciennes | St.-Gery Church | 1st third of 13th century | parts of the buttresses; originally abbey of the Recollet Friars; steeple built in the 19th century | |
| ↓ | Nord | Volckerinckhove | Église Saint-Folquin | | | |
| ↑ | Nord | Warhem | Église Notre-Dame de l'Assomption | | | |
| | Nord | Watten | Abbey Notre-Dame du Mont | | ruins (images) | |
| ↓ | Nord | Watten | Saint-Gilles Church | | (images) | |
| ↑ | Nord | West-Cappel | Église Saint-Sylvestre | | | |
| ↓ | Nord | Wormhout | St-Martin Church | restored 1547–1689 | pale "sand brick" | |
| ↑ | Pas de Calais | Arras | House of the three Lepards | 1467 | | |
| ↓ | Pas de Calais | Calais | Église Notre-Dame | | partly of brick (images) | |
| ↑ | Pas de Calais | Calais | Tour du Guet | | | |
| ↑ | Pas de Calais | Ham-en-Artois | Église Saint-Sauveur | | partly of brick (images) | |
| ↑ | Pas de Calais | Hesdin | Église Notre-Dame | before 1554 | Renaissance portal of 1585 (Wikimedia has no images of the Gothic phase.) | |
| | Pas de Calais | Zutkerque | Saint-Martin Church | | | |
| ↑ | Somme | Beaucamps-le-Jeune | Église Notre-Dame-de-l'Assomption | | (images) | |
| ↑ | Somme | Rambures | Château de Rambures | 15th century | | |

Navigation: North • Alsace • Center • Burgundy/Bresse • Forez • South

==== Alsace ====
| Department | Place | Building | time of construction | Notes | Image |
|---|---|---|---|---|---|
| Bas-Rhin | Strasbourg | Towers of the Ponts Couverts | 1230–1250 | | |

Navigation: North • Alsace • Center • Burgundy/Bresse • Forez • South

==== Central France, south and west of Orléans ====
In the Loir-et-Cher department, there is a small group of Gothic brick buildings. One of them even is among the most famous buildings of France, though not for its bricks.

| Department | Place | Building | Time of construction | Notes | Image |
|---|---|---|---|---|---|
| Eure-et-Loir | Villebon | Villebon Castle | 14th century | | |
| Indre-et-Loire | La Riche | Château de Plessis-lez-Tours | 15th–16th century | Brick-and-Stone, largely restored in 19th and 20th century | |
| Loir-et-Cher | Blois | Blois Castle | 1440–1501 | wings of Charles VIII and Louis XII, Flamboyant style and onset of the Brick-and-Stone style | |
| Loir-et-Cher | Lassay-sur-Croisne | Château du Moulin | 15th century | | |
| Loir-et-Cher | Chaumont-sur-Tharonne | St-Étienne (st Steven's Church) | 15th century | | |
| Loir-et-Cher | Saint-Viâtre | Saint-Viâtre Church | early 16th century | southern façade of the transept | |
| Loir-et-Cher | Souvigny-en-Sologne | Saint-Martin Church | 16th century | western part of the nave | |
| Loir-et-Cher | Vouzon | St-Peter's Church | 15th–16th century | tower: stone and mosaic of bricks | |

Navigation: North • Alsace • Center • Burgundy/Bresse • Forez • South

==== (Ducal) Burgundy and Franche Comté region ====
In Middle Ages, the same rulers were Dukes of Burgundy as French vassals and Counts of Burgundy as vassals of the Holy Roman Empire.

| Department | Place | Building | Time of construction | Notes | Image |
|---|---|---|---|---|---|
| Côte-d'Or | Citeaux Abbey | Library | 1260–1509 | Abbey founded in 1098, mother of all Cistercian abbeys; outer walls of the library with mosaics of varnished brick | |
| Ain | Bâgé-la-Ville | Chapelle d'Aigrefeuille | about 1200 | | |
| Ain | Châtillon-sur-Chalaronne | Saint-Andrew's Church | 1273 | | |
| Ain | Châtillon-sur-Chalaronne | Château de Châtillon-sur-Chalaronne | 11th–15th century | ruins | |
| Saône-et-Loire | Louhans | Saint-Peter's Church | | | |
| Saône-et-Loire | Mervans | Village church | 14th century | | |

Navigation: North • Alsace • Center • Burgundy/Bresse • Forez • South

==== Forez ====
– Between Burgundy and Languedoc –

| Department | Place | Building | Time of construction | Notes | Image |
|---|---|---|---|---|---|
| Loire | Sainte-Agathe-la-Bouteresse | Bonlieu Abbey | 12th–14th centuries | only partly brick, nowadays disused as an agricultural building | no photo in WM Commons |

Navigation: North • Alsace • Center • Burgundy/Bresse • Forez • South

==== Southern France around Toulouse ====
Toulouse • Albi • Pamiers

| ↕ | Department | Place | Building | Time of construction | Notes | Image |
|---|---|---|---|---|---|---|
| ↓ | Haute-Garonne | Toulouse | Toulouse Cathedral (images) | | | |
| ↓ | Haute-Garonne | Toulouse | Couvent des Cordeliers (images) | | ruins | |
| ↓ | Haute-Garonne | Toulouse | Church of the Jacobins (images) | | | |
| ↑ | Haute-Garonne | Toulouse | Saint Nicolas Church | | | |
| ↓ | Haute-Garonne | Toulouse | Notre-Dame du Taur | | | |
| ↑ | Haute-Garonne | Toulouse | Notre-Dame de la Dalbade (images) | | | |
| ↓ | Haute-Garonne | Toulouse | Hôtel Vinhas | | | |
| ↑ | Haute-Garonne | Toulouse | Rue Croix-Baragnon, house n° 15 (images) | | Romano-Gothic | |
| ↓ | Haute-Garonne | Toulouse | Rue Croix-Baragnon, house n° 19 | | much altered | |
| ↑ | Haute-Garonne | Auterive | Saint-Paul's Church | | | |
| ↓ | Haute-Garonne | Daux | Eglise Saint-Barthélémy (images) de Daux | | | |
| ↑ | Haute-Garonne | Grenade, Haute-Garonne | Our-Lady's-Assumption Church* | | | |
| ↓ | Haute-Garonne | Villefranche-de-Lauragais | Our-Lady's-Assumption Church* | | | |
| ↑ | Tarn | Albi | Cathedral of Saint-Cecile (images) | | | |
| ↓ | Tarn | Albi | Palais de la Berbie (images) | | in the Cité Épiscopale | |
| ↑ | Tarn | Gaillac | Abbaye Saint-Michel (images) | | | |
| ↓ | Tarn | Gaillac | Église Saint-Pierre (images) | | | |
| ↑ | Tarn | Lavaur | Cathedral Saint-Alain | | | |
| ↓ | Tarn | Lavaur | Saint-Francis Church | | | |
| ↑ | Tarn | Rabastens | Église Notre-Dame-du-Bourg | | | |
| ↓ | Tarn-et-Garonne | Montauban | Église Saint-Jacques | | | |
| ↑ | Tarn-et-Garonne | Beaumont-de-Lomagne | Our-Lady's-Assumption Church* | | | |
| ↓ | Tarn-et-Garonne | Finhan | Église Saint-Martin | | Gothic Revival modifications | |
| ↑ | Ariège | Pamiers | Cathédrale Saint-Antonin (images) | | | |
| ↓ | Ariège | Pamiers | Église Notre-Dame-du-Camp (images) | 1343, 1466 | built on a Romanesque predecessor (portal of the 12th century), later reconstructions in 1672, 1769, 1773 | |
| ↑ | Ariège | Pamiers | Tour des Cordeliers (images) | | | |
| ↓ | Ariège | Pamiers | Tour de l'hôtel des Monnaies | | | |
| ↑ | Gers | The department of Gers has a significant number of buildings in Southern French Gothic style, built of stone, such as the cathedrals of Condom and Lectoure. Its brick buildings are found in the southwest, near to Toulouse region. | | | | |
| ↑ | Gers | Gimont | Our-Lady's-Assumption Church* | | | |
| ↑ | Gers | Lombez | Saint-Mary's Cathedral | | | |
| ↑ | Gers | Simorre | Église Notre-Dame | | | |

(*) "Our-Lady's-Assumption Church" = Église Notre-Dame-de-l'Assomption

Navigation ⇑ : North • Alsace • Center • Burgundy/Bresse • Forez • South

Navigation: BELA • BEL • CZ • DK • ENG • EST • FIN • FRA • GER • HUNG • ITA • LAT • LIT • NL • POL • RUS • SK • SWE • SWI • UKR

=== Germany ===
See List of Gothic brick buildings in Germany

=== Hungary ===
– In Hungary, there is much more hidden than visible medieval brick. During the 145 years of Ottoman occupation, many churches fell in ruins. At about 1700 they were restored, inclusively of plastering, which need not necessary have existed before. In ruins of the Turkish wars and of World War II, brick can be visible, though these buildings had been plastered in their time of function. –

| Place | Building | Main period of construction | Special features | Image |
|---|---|---|---|---|
| Árpás, west bank of Rába river | Szent Jakab apostol | 1251 | Premonstratensian, generally Romanesque building with few Gothic details | |
| Budapest | Tower of St. Mary Magdalene's Church | about 1400 | nave of stone, destroyed in the end of WW: II | |
| Szentes, east of lower Tisza river | with proviso: Ecser church | | ruin of a perhaps originally plastered church | |
| Egyházasdengeleg, east of Esztergom | St. Imre church | 14th century gothic enlargement of a Roamnesque stone church of 11th/12th century | | |
| Nagygéc, Csengersima, NE corner of Hungary | with proviso: Reformed church | 13th century | Romanesque church with a Gothic choir, temporarily widely unplastered, but now plastered again | |
| Somogyvámos, south of lake Balaton | with proviso: Puszta church | 13th century | ruin of an originally plastered church | |
| Türje, Zala County, NW of lake Balaton | Premonstratensian abbey church | begun between 1230 & 1240 | Romanesque-Gothic transitional style, reconstruction about 1900 | |

Navigation: BELA • BEL • CZ • DK • ENG • EST • FIN • FRA • GER • HUNG • ITA • LAT • LIT • NL • POL • RUS • SK • SWE • SWI • UKR

=== Italy ===
Regions of Italy: ABR • EM-RO • FRI • LIG • LOM • MAR • PIE • TUS • VEN

==== Abruzzo ====
| ↕ | Place | Building | Main period of construction | Special features | Image |
|---|---|---|---|---|---|
| ↓ | Atessa | Cathedral St Leucius | 13th century | Renaissance alterations | |
| ↓ | Lanciano | Santa Maria Maggiore, Lanciano | | Tower and originally possibly plastered vaults | |
| ↓ | Penne (on hills between two rivers, view to Gran Sasso d'Italia) | Penne Cathedral | 11th–13th centuries | interim Baroque decoration, nowadays withdrawn | |
| ↓ | Penne (on hills between two rivers, view to Gran Sasso d'Italia) | various private palazzi | | nowadays mainly Renaissance, but some originally Gothic | |

Regions of Italy: ABR • EM-RO • LIG • LOM • MAR • PIE • TUS • VEN

==== Emilia-Romagna ====
Bologna • Imola • Parma • Piacenza • Rimini

| ↕ | Place | Building | Main period of construction | Special features | Image |
|---|---|---|---|---|---|
| ↑ | Bazzano (Valsamoggia) | Rocca dei Bentivoglio | | | |
| ↑ | Bobbio | Cathedral | 1463 | central section of western façade, stylistically not very Gothic | |
| ↑ | Bologna | Basilica of San Francesco | 1236–1263 | | |
| ↑ | Bologna | Basilica of San Giacomo Maggiore | | | |
| ↓ | Bologna | Basilica di Santa Maria dei Servi | | | |
| ↑ | Bologna | San Martino | | | |
| ↓ | Bologna | San Petronio Basilica | | The world's largest Gothic brick church (volume about 260,000 m^{3}) | |
| ↑ | Bologna | Palazzo d'Accursio | | the city hall | |
| ↓ | Bologna | Palazzo della Mercanzia | | a guild hall | |
| ↑ | Busseto, (PA) | Collegiata di San Bartolomeo Apostolo | | | |
| ↓ | Busseto, (PA) | Chiesa e convento di Santa Maria degli Angeli | | | |
| ↑ | Castell'Arquato | Castle Visconti Rocca | | Castle mainly bricks | |
| ↓ | Cento | Castle La Rocca di Cento, 13th–15th century | | Gothic & Renaissance | |
| ↑ | Cesena | Cesena Cathedral | | on the border of Romanesque and Gothic styles | |
| ↑ | Copparo | Santa Maria di Savonuzzo | | Romanesque style in Gothic style age | |
| ↓ | Cotignola, (RV) | Church of San Francesco, | 15th century | | |
| ↑ | Ferrara | Castello Estense | various stages since 1385 | main residence of the House of Este | |
| ↓ | Ferrara | Sant'Antonio in Polesine | | | |
| ↑ | Imola | Chiesa dei Santi Nicolò e Domenico | | | |
| ↓ | Imola | Convento dell'Osservanza | since 1391 | | |
| ↑ | Imola | Rocca Sforzesca (Sforza Fortress) | 14th–15th century | | |
| ↓ | Lugo | Rocca Estense (Este fort) | 15th century | | |
| ↑ | Mirandola (MO) | Church of Gesù and San Francesco | | damaged by the earthquakes of 2012 | |
| | Mirandola (MO) | Castle of the Pico | since 1311 | | |
| ↓ | Modena | San Francesco Parish Church | 1244–1445 | | |
| | Molinella | Torre di Santo Stefano | 1322–1404 | | |
| ↑ | Parma | San Francesco del Prato | 13th–16th centuries | | |
| | Parma | Cathedral | 11th–15th centuries | mainly Romanesque, but some chapels Gothic | |
| ↓ | Outskirts of Parma | Certosa di Paradigna | 1298–1385 | | |
| ↑ | Piacenza | Palazzo Comunale | | | |
| ↓ | Piacenza | Basilica of Sant'Antonino | | | |
| ↑ | Piacenza | San Francesco Church | | | |
| ↓ | Piacenza | San Giovanni in Canale | | | |
| ↑ | Castel; San Giovanni | Chiesa di San Giovanni Battista | | | |
| ↓ | Ravenna | Campanile of the Church of San Michele in Africisco | Church of 6th century, tower of 14th/15th century | | |
| ↑ | Reggio Emilia | Palazzo del Capitano del Popolo | | | |
| ↓ | Rimini | Sant'Agostino | | | |
| ↑ | Rimini | Palazzo dell'Arengo | | | |
| ↑ | Rimini | Palazzo del Podestà | | | |
| ↑ | Valconasso | La Chiesa dell'Annunciazione di Valconasso | 1st half of 14th century | | |
| ↑ | Vignola | Rocca di Vignola | 12th–15th centuries | | |
| ↑ | Vigolzone | Castello di Grazzano Visconti | 1395 | | |

⬆ : Bologna • Imola • Parma • Piacenza • Rimini

Regions of Italy: ABR • EM-RO • LIG • LOM • MAR • PIE • TUS • VEN

==== Liguria ====
| Place | Building | main period of construction | special features | Image |
|---|---|---|---|---|
| Genoa | San Matteo | 12th–16th century | Cloister beside the church | |

Regions of Italy: ABR • EM-RO • LIG • LOM • MAR • PIE • TUS • VEN

==== Lombardy ====
Cremona • Lodi • Mantua (Mantova) • Milan(o) • Monza • Pavia

| ↕ | Place | Building | Main period of construction | Special features | Image |
|---|---|---|---|---|---|
| ↓ | Abbiategrasso (MI) | Visconti Castle | | | |
| ↓ | Bergamo | Visconti Citadel (Bergamo) | | arcades of the court – the only unplastered medieval bricks in Bergamo | |
| ↓ | Brescia | Chiesa di Sant'Agostino | | | |
| ↓ | Brescia | Broletto | brick 14th–early 15th century | only parts, especially those built under Pandolfo III Malatesta | |
| ↑ | Brescia | Corpus Christi Church | 1467–1473 | on the edge of Renaissance, but the frieze of preformed brick on top of the gable is still Gothic | |
| ↓ | Brescia | San Francesco Church | 1254–1394 | | |
| ↑ | Brescia | St-John-Evangelist Church | 400–1440 | Gothic façade of layers of ashlar alternating with layers of brick | |
| ↓ | Brescia | Pallata Tower, Brescia | 1476–1481 | Only the top is of brick | |
| ↑ | Carpiano (CR) | Saint Martin's Church | | | |
| ↓ | Castiglione Olona (VA) | Santi Stefano & Lorenzo | 1422–1435 | | |
| ↑ | Crema (CR) | Duomo di Crema | | | |
| ↓ | Cremona | Cathedral | 12th–14th centuries | transept & campanile Gothic | |
| ↑ | Cremona | Baptistery | | started in Romanesque style and marble, accomplished in Gothic style and brick | |
| ↓ | Cremona | San Michele Vetere | | | |
| ↑ | Cremona | Loggia dei Militi | | | |
| ↓ | Cremona | Palazzo Cittanova | | | |
| ↑ | Cusago (CR) | Abbazia Santa Maria Rossa | | | |
| ↓ | Lentate sul Seveso (MB) | Oratory of Santo Stefano | | | |
| ↑ | Lodi | Sant'Agnese | | | |
| ↓ | Lodi | Duomo, Romanesque/Gothic | | | |
| ↑ | Lodi | San Francesco | | | |
| ↓ | Mantua (Mantova) | San Francesco | | | |
| ↑ | Mantua (Mantova) | Ducal palace | | | |
| ↓ | Milan (Milano) | Abbazia di Chiaravalle | | | |
| ↑ | Milan (Milano) | Basilica of Sant'Ambrogio | | late Antiquity/Romanesque/early Gothic | |
| ↓ | Milan (Milano) | Basilica of Sant'Eustorgio | | | |
| ↑ | Milan (Milano) | Church of San Cristoforo sul Naviglio | | Late Gothic | |
| ↓ | Milan (Milano) | San Marco, Milan | | | |
| ↑ | Milan (Milano) | Santa Maria Assunta di Crescenzago | | | |
| ↓ | Milan (Milano) | Santa Maria del Carmine | | | |
| ↑ | Milan (Milano) | Palazzo Borromeo | | | |
| ↓ | Milan (Milano) | Sforza Castle | | Some parts, especially Filarete Tower, are rather 19th century reconstructions than original. | |
| ↑ | Monza | San Maria in Strada | | | |
| ↓ | Monza | Duomo di Monza | | only façade of stone | |
| ↑ | Monza | Arengario | 13th century | | |
| ↓ | Monza | Teolinda Tower | 13th century | former city gate | |
| ↑ | Pandino (CR) | Visconti Castle | | | |
| ↓ | Pavia | Castello Visconteo | 1360 | | |
| | Pavia | Santa Maria del Carmine | | | |
| ↑ | Pavia | Convento dei Francescani (former Franciscan convent) | | | |
| ↓ | Pozzuolo Martesana (MI) | Chiesa di San Francesco | | | |
| | Revere | Torre del Castello | 1125–1350 | | |
| ↑ | San Giuliano Milanese | Abbazia dei Santi Pietro e Paolo in Viboldone | | | |
| ↑ | Sant'Angelo Lodigiano | Castello Morando Bolognini | | | |
| ↑ | Siziano (PV) | Abbazia di Campomorto | | | |
| ↑ | Solaro (MI) | Oratorio dei Santi Ambrogio e Caterina | | | |
| | Suzzara | Torre Civica (City Tower) | early 14th century | | |
| ↑ | Voghera | Visconti Castle | | | |
| ↑ | Vigevano | Castello Visconteo-Sforzesco di Vigevano | | | |
| ↑ | Vigevano | San Pietro Martire | | | |
| ↑ | Vigevano | Chiesa di San Francesco | | | |

⬆ : Cremona • Lodi • Mantua (Mantova) • Milan(o) • Monza • Pavia

Regions of Italy: ABR • EM-RO • LIG • LOM • MAR • PIE • TUS • VEN

==== Marche ====
| ↕ | Place | Building | Main period of construction | Special features | Image |
|---|---|---|---|---|---|
| ↓ | Amandola | Sant'Agostino Church | 1464 | Gothic belltower | |
| ↓ | Ancona | Palazzo degli Anziani | 15th century | an ancient city hall | |
| ↓ | Ancona | Palazzo Benincasa | 15th century | | |
| ↓ | Ancona | Loggia dei Mercanti | 1442–1459 | Venecian Gothic, parts of the upper storeys of brick | |
| ↑ | Cupra Marittima | Santa Maria in Castello | since 1227 | Romanesque with Gothic alterations | |
| ↓ | Fabriano | Sant'Agostino | | upper parts of the façade of brick | |
| ↑ | Fermo | Saint-Francis | | bell tower | |
| ↓ | Fermo | San Domenico | 1233–1491 | concathedral | no photo in WM Commons |
| ↑ | Jesi | Saint-Mark Church | 12th century and later | | |
| ↓ | Pesaro | Sant'Agostino | 1258–1413 | lateral wall Gothic an of washed bric | |
| ↑ | San Ginesio | San Ginesio Collegiate Church | up to 1421 | decorations in Floral Gothic style | |
| ↓ | San Severino Marche | Saint Severin's Old Sanctuary | | | |
| ↑ | San Severino Marche | Church of San Lorenzo in Doliolo | | | no photo in WM Commons |
| ↑ | Urbino | St-Domenico ( | | western façade Gothic | |
| ↑ | Urbino | Oratory of St-John Baptist ( | | | |

Regions of Italy: ABR • EM-RO • LIG • LOM • MAR • PIE • TUS • VEN

==== Piedmont ====
Asti • Carmagnola • Mondovì • Turin • Vercelli

| ↕ | Place | Building | Main period of construction | Special features | Image |
|---|---|---|---|---|---|
| ↓ | Acqui Terme | Cathedral St Mary | | belltower Gothic | |
| ↓ | Alba | Chiesa di San Domenico | 13th/14th centuries | | |
| ↓ | Alessandria | St Mary's Church of the Castle | | | |
| ↓ | Asti | Cathedral of St-Mary's Assumption | | | |
| ↑ | Asti | Santa Maria di Viatosto | 15th century | Romanesque & Gothic | |
| ↓ | Asti | Palazzo del Podestà | 13th century | Romanesque & Gothic | |
| ↑ | Asti | private palazzi: Palazzo Catena (15th century); Palazzo Zoya (13th century) | | | |
| ↓ | Asti | Palazzo Natta & Torre natta | 11th century and later | | |
| ↑ | Asti | other patrician towers: Torre Comentina (13th century); Torre Guttuari (1304); Torre De Regibus (12th century and later) | | | |
| ↑ | Bra | Palazzo Traversa | 15th century | | |
| ↓ | Carmagnola | St-Peter-and-Paul Church | | | |
| ↑ | Carmagnola | Castle Castello di Carmagnola | 13th century | | |
| ↓ | Carmagnola | Palazzo Lomellini | 15th century | alterations in 18th century | |
| ↑ | Carmagnola | Casa Borioli | 15th century | | no photo in WM Commons |
| ↓ | Castelnuovo Scrivia | Castello Podestarile | | | |
| ↑ | Chivasso | Santa Maria Assunta | 1415–1429 | outside Gothic inside Baroque | |
| ↓ | Cuneo | St-Francis Church & compound | 15th century | predecessors since 13th century, nowadays municipal museum | |
| ↑ | Fossano | Castle of the Princes of Acaja | 1314–1332 | about 1500 transformed from a fortification into a residential palace | |
| ↓ | Gattinara | St-Peter Church | 1470 | only western façade still Gothic | |
| ↑ | Moncalieri | Chiesa collegiata di S. Maria della Scala | 1232–1330 | | no photo in WM Commons |
| ↓ | Mondovì | Municipal Tower (Torre Civica del Belvedere) | 13th–14th century | | |
| ↑ | Mondovì | Palazzo del Governatore | | ground flour arcades | |
| ↓ | Mondovì | Palazzo Fauzone | | ground flour arcades | |
| ↑ | Mondovì | Casa Giolitti | | | |
| ↓ | Rossana | Santa Maria Assunta | 14th century | | no photo in WM Commons |
| ↑ | Saluzzo | Saluzzo Cathedral | | | |
| ↓ | Turin | San Domenico Church | 14th–15th centuries | | |
| ↑ | Turin | Casa dei Romagnano | 14th–16th century | Gothic brick arches | |
| ↓ | Turin | Casa del Senato | 14th & 16th century | | |
| ↑ | Turin | Casa Broglia | 14th crntury | | |
| ↓ | Vercelli | Basilica di Sant'Andrea | | Romanesque windows, Gothic vaults, façade of stone | |
| ↑ | Vercelli | Visconti Castle | | | |
| ↑ | Vercelli | San Marco Church | | Campanile | |
| ↑ | Vercelli | San Paolo Church | | | |
| ↑ | Vercelli | patrician towers | | | |

⬆ : Asti • Carmagnola • Mondovì • Turin • Vercelli

Regions of Italy: ABR • EM-RO • LIG • LOM • MAR • PIE • TUS • VEN

==== Tuscany ====
Montepulciano • Pisa • Prato • San Gimigniano • Siena

| ↕ | Place | Building | Main period of construction | Special features | Image |
|---|---|---|---|---|---|
| ↓ | Grosseto | Campanile of the Cathedral | 15th century | later alterations of the windows | |
| ↓ | Lucca | Casa Barletti-Baroni | 13th century | | |
| ↓ | Lucca | Guinigi Tower and Palace | 14th century | | |
| ↓ | Montepulciano | San Francesco Church | 13th–16th centuries | Franciscan abbey church | |
| ↓ | Montepulciano | Palazzo Neri Orselli | 14th century | | |
| ↑ | Montepulciano | "Pulcinella" clock tower | | | |
| ↓ | Piombino | Sant'Antimo | 1284–1289 | | |
| ↑ | Piombino | Casa delle Bifore | 1284–1289 | upper storeys mainly of brick | |
| ↓ | Pisa | Palazzo Agostini, Pisa | 15th century | | |
| ↑ | Pisa | Palazzo Vecchio de' Medici | since 11th century | alterations to Renaissance, then in the 19th century re-(?)gothified | |
| ↓ | Pisa | Palazzo Poschi | 15th century | | |
| ↑ | Pisa | Torre Lanfreducci | 12th & 14th century | | |
| ↓ | Pistoia | Ancient Bishops' Palace | 12th–13th century | prossibly originally plastered | |
| ↑ | Prato | Sant'Agostino church | 1400–1440 | top section of the tower of pure brick, other walls of a Byzantine structure – layers of brick among layers of small boulders | |
| | Prato | San Domenico, Prato | 1282–1323 | windows and bell tower of brick | |
| ↓ | Piazzanese, Prato | San Giusto church | 1360 | Campanile with windows of brick | |
| ↑ | San Gimignano | Palazzo Comunale | 1323 | | |
| ↓ | San Gimignano | Sant'Agostino Church | 13th century | | |
| ↑ | San Gimignano | Old Palace of the Podestà | rebuilt in 1239, enlarged in 1337 | | |
| ↓ | San Gimignano | various private palazzi | | 1. Palazzo della Cancelleria; 2. Palazzo Razzi; 3. Palazzo Tinacci; 4. Palazzo Tortoli; (1) (2) | (3) (4) |
| ↑ | Siena | Basilica of San Domenico | | | |
| ↓ | Siena | Basilica of San Francesco | | | |
| ↑ | Siena | Palazzo Pubblico | | | |
| ↓ | Siena | Palazzo Sansedoni | 1330 | seat of Monte dei Pasci Foundation | |
| ↑ | Siena | various private palazzi | Palazzo Buonsignori, onset in 1440; Palazzo Brigidi, 14th century; Palazzo Chigi Saracini, 12th & 14th century; Palazzo Cinughi de' Pazzi, 14th century; Palazzo Turchi, 14th–16th century, Goth./Ren. | | |
| ↑ | Siena | Porta Tufi | 1325–1326 | | |
| ↑ | Santa Maria dei Servi, Siena | San Clemente basiica & monastery | 13th – 16th century | | |
| ↑ | Volterra | Fortezza Medicea | 14th–15th century | arcades supporting the balustrades | |

⬆ : Montepulciano • Pisa • Prato • San Gimigniano • Siena

Regions of Italy: ABR • EM-RO • LIG • LOM • MAR • PIE • TUS • VEN

==== Veneto and Friuli-Venezia Giulia ====
Lendinara • Treviso • Venice (Venezia) • Verona

| ↕ | Place | Building | Main period of construction | Special features | Image |
|---|---|---|---|---|---|
| ↓ | Badia Polesine | Este Palace | 1430 | | |
| ↓ | Cividale del Friuli | Town hall (Palazzo Comunale) | 1286 and 1545–1588 | | |
| ↓ | Isola della Scala | Torre scaligera | 13th century | in some parts mixed with stones | |
| ↑ | Este | Castello Carrarese | 1339 | | |
| ↓ | Este | Rocca di Ponte di/della Torre | 12th & 13th centuries | | |
| ↑ | Lendinara | Chiesa di Sant'Anna | 1433 | | |
| ↓ | Lendinara | Palazzo Pretorio and Torre Maistra | end of 14th century | | |
| ↑ | Lendinara | Torre dell'Orologio | | originally a Gothic city gate, in 17th century converted into the presentday clock tower | |
| ↓ | Lendinara | Castel Trivellin | probably 1390 | only relics | |
| ↑ | Montagnana | Duomo di Santa Maria Assunta | 1431–1502 | with Renaissance additions | |
| ↓ | Montagnana | Town wall | | Well preserved circle, some parts of brick, others of stone | |
| ↑ | Padua | Basilica of Saint Anthony | | | |
| ↓ | Padua | Cappella degli Scrovegni | | | |
| ↑ | Pordenone | Cathedral of St. Mark (Duomo) | | | |
| ↓ | Pordenone | Town hall | | | |
| ↑ | Portogruaro | Town hall | | | |
| ↓ | Udine | Cathedral | 13th–14th centuries | | |
| ↑ | Treviso (most famous brick: Romanesque; Palazzo dei Trecento) | San Francesco church | 1231–1270 | main nave Romanesque, choir & southern aisle Gothic | |
| ↓ | Treviso (most famous brick: Romanesque; Palazzo dei Trecento) | Santa Maria Maggiore | Gothic since 1473 | after destruction by war 1511 mannerist reconstruction | |
| ↑ | Treviso (most famous brick: Romanesque; Palazzo dei Trecento) | St Catherine church | 1346 – early 15th century | partly visible brick, partly plastered; today housing a museum | |
| ↓ | Venice | Ca' Foscari | | main façade of stone | |
| ↑ | Venice | Sant'Elena | | | |
| ↓ | Venice | Santi Giovanni | | | |
| ↑ | Venice | San Gregorio | | | |
| ↓ | Venice | Madonna dell'Orto | | | |
| ↑ | Venice | Santa Maria Gloriosa dei Frari | | | |
| ↓ | Verona (proper republic since 1136, proper signoria since 1259, Venetian since 1405) | Sant'Anastasia Church | | | |
| ↑ | Verona (proper republic since 1136, proper signoria since 1259, Venetian since 1405) | Juliet's House | | | |
| ↓ | Verona (proper republic since 1136, proper signoria since 1259, Venetian since 1405) | Palazzo del Podestà | 13th century | though erected in "Gothic age", only few parts in Gothic design | |
| ↑ | Verona (proper republic since 1136, proper signoria since 1259, Venetian since 1405) | San Tomaso Becket | 1351, 1484 | | |
| ↓ | Verona (proper republic since 1136, proper signoria since 1259, Venetian since 1405) | Chiesa San Fermo Maggiore | 10–11th, Gothic 14th century | | |
| ↑ | Verona (proper republic since 1136, proper signoria since 1259, Venetian since 1405) | Santi Nazaro e Celso | 14th century | | |
| ↓ | Verona (proper republic since 1136, proper signoria since 1259, Venetian since 1405) | Sant'Eufemia, Church | 1275–1450 | | |
| ↑ | Verona (proper republic since 1136, proper signoria since 1259, Venetian since 1405) | San Bernardino Church | 15th century | | |
| ↓ | Verona (proper republic since 1136, proper signoria since 1259, Venetian since 1405) | Chiesa di San Pietro Martire | 1283 | | |
| ↑ | Verona (proper republic since 1136, proper signoria since 1259, Venetian since 1405) | Castelvecchio | 1354–1356 | | |
| ↑ | Verona (proper republic since 1136, proper signoria since 1259, Venetian since 1405) | Castelvecchio Bridge | 1354–1356 | after destruction in WW II, now farly a replique | |
| ↑ | Verona (proper republic since 1136, proper signoria since 1259, Venetian since 1405) | Domus Mercatorum | 1301 | | |
| ↑ | Vicenza | Palazzo Thiene | | only western wing | |
| ↑ | Villafranca di Verona | Castello Scaligero | 13th century | tower and some other parts | |

⬆ : Lendinara • Treviso • Venice (Venezia) • Verona

Italy: ABR • EM-RO • FRI • LIG • LOM • MAR • PIE • TUS • VEN

Regions of Italy: BELA • BEL • CZ • DK • ENG • EST • FIN • FRA • GER • HUNG • ITA • LAT • LIT • NL • POL • RUS • SK • SWE • SWI • UKR

=== Latvia ===
| Place | Building | Main period of construction | Special features | Image |
|---|---|---|---|---|
| Alūksne | with proviso: Alūksne Castle | | many part of boulders only, some walls mainly of brick, but probably originally not visible | |
| Bauska | with proviso: Dobele Castle | | some walls mainly of brick, but probably originally not visible | |
| Dobele | with proviso: Dobele Castle | | generally of boulders, one tower of brick, but perhaps not visible | |
| Ludza | Ludza Castle | 1399 | wally of mixed material with brick surface; destroyed in 1654 | |
| Riga | Cathedral | 13th century | | |
| Riga | St. Peter | 13th to 15th century | | |
| Riga | St James | 13th century | | |
| Riga | St. John | 15th century | formerly Dominican | |
| Riga | House of the Blackheads | late 14th century onwards | Destroyed in World War II and rebuilt in 1995 | |
| Riga | The oldest of the Three Brothers | late 15th century | | |
| Turaida | Castle | 14th century | | |

Navigation: BELA • BEL • CZ • DK • ENG • EST • FIN • FRA • GER • HUNG • ITA • LAT • LIT • NL • POL • RUS • SK • SWE • SWI • UKR

=== Lithuania ===
| ↕ | Place | Building | Main period of construction | Special features | Image |
|---|---|---|---|---|---|
| ↓ | Vilnius | St. Anne's | 1495–1500 | exceptional use of Late Gothic Flamboyant style | |
| ↓ | Vilnius | Church of St. Francis and St. Bernard | 15th century and later repairs | one of the biggest Gothic ensembles (has Renaissance details) in Lithuania | |
| ↓ | Vilnius | St. Nicholas | Late 14th century | oldest surviving Catholic church building in Lithuania | |
| ↓ | Vilnius | Gediminas Tower and Upper Castle | Early 15th century, many later alterations | built by Grand Duke of Lithuania Vytautas | |
| ↑ | Kaunas | Cathedral | since 1408 | basilica, the largest Gothic church in Lithuania | |
| ↓ | Kaunas | Castle | since mid-14th century | oldest brick castle in Lithuania | |
| ↑ | Kaunas | St. Gertrude | 15th century? | one of the oldest Gothic churches in Lithuania | |
| ↓ | Kaunas | Church of The Accession of The Holy Virgin | about 1400 | former Franciscan, Latin cross footplan | |
| ↑ | Kaunas | House of Perkūnas | late 15th century | the other example of exceptional brick Flamboyant style | |
| ↓ | Kėdainiai | St. George Church | 1403 | various reconstractions | |
| ↑ | Medininkai | Castle | 13th century | The only surviving enclosure type castle and the largest in Lithuania | |
| ↑ | Trakai | Island Castle | 14th – early 15th century | built by Grand Dukes of Lithuania Kęstutis and Vytautas. | |
| ↑ | Trakai | Peninsula Castle | Late 14th century and later repairs | built by Grand Duke of Lithuania Kęstutis | |
| ↑ | Zapyškis | St. John The Baptist church | between 1530 & 1578 | the only surviving rural Gothic church in Lithuania. | |

Navigation: BELA • BEL • CZ • DK • ENG • EST • FIN • FRA • GER • HUNG • ITA • LAT • LIT • NL • POL • RUS • SK • SWE • SWI • UKR

=== Netherlands ===
See List of Gothic brick buildings in the Netherlands

=== Poland ===
See List of Gothic brick buildings in Poland

Navigation: BELA • BEL • CZ • DK • ENG • EST • FIN • FRA • GER • HUNG • ITA • LAT • LIT • NL • POL • RUS • SK • SWE • SWI • UKR

=== Russia ===
==== Historical Russia ====
| Place | Building | Main period of construction | Special features | Image |
|---|---|---|---|---|
| Novgorod Kremlin | Chamber of Facets | 1433 | 1441 decorated with frescos (nowadays almost lost) | |

==== Kaliningrad exclave ====
| ↕ | Place | Building | Main period of construction | Special features | Image |
|---|---|---|---|---|---|
| ↓ | Kaliningrad | Königsberg Cathedral | 14th century | | |
| ↓ | Kaliningrad | Juditten Church in Mendeleyevo | Late 13th century | | |
| ↓ | Druzhba | Allenburg Church | 15th century | | |
| ↑ | Guryevsk | Neuhausen church | | | |
| ↓ | Gvardeyskoye | Mühlhausen Church | 1st half of 14th century | restored | |
| ↑ | Kashtanovo | Almenhausen church | | ruins since 1945 | |
| ↓ | Kumachyovo | Kumehnen Church | end 14th century | | |
| ↑ | Logvino | Medenau church | | poor relics | |
| ↓ | Neman | Teutonic Knight's castle of Ragnit | 1397–1409 | One of the strongest castles of the Teutonic Order. Built by Nikolaus von Fellenstein (see Malbork). Now ruined | |
| ↑ | Porechye | Allenau church | | | |
| ↓ | Pravdinsk | Friedland church | | | |
| ↑ | Rodniki | Arnau Church | Late 14th century | | |
| ↓ | Romanovo | Pobethen church | | preserved tower plastered | |
| ↑ | Turgenevo | Groß Legitten church | | | |
| ↓ | Ushakovo | Baldau church | | | |
| ↑ | Vesyoloye | Teutonic Knight's castle of Balga | c. 1239 | Ruin since centuries | |
| ↑ | Vladimirovo | Tharau church | | restored | |
| ↑ | Zheleznodorozhny | Gerdauen church | | | |
| ↑ | Zhemchuzhnoje | Schaaken church | | | |

Navigation: BELA • BEL • CZ • DK • ENG • EST • FIN • FRA • GER • HUNG • ITA • LAT • LIT • NL • POL • RUS • SK • SWE • SWI • UKR

=== Slovakia ===
| Place | Building | Time of construction | Notes | Image |
|---|---|---|---|---|
| Červený Kláštor, on Dunajec river (Polish border) | Red Monastery | 2nd half of 14th century | vault ribs and some cornices of visible brick | |

Navigation: BELA • BEL • CZ • DK • ENG • EST • FIN • FRA • GER • HUNG • ITA • LAT • LIT • NL • POL • RUS • SK • SWE • SWI • UKR

=== Sweden ===
Until 1658, Malmö, Lund and Helsingborg were Danish.

Lund • Malmö • Stockholm • Uppsala • Ystad

| ↕ | Place | Building | Main period of construction | Special features | Image |
|---|---|---|---|---|---|
| ↓ | Balingsta Parish, southwest of Uppsala | Vik Castle | Circa 1450, 17th and 19th century alterations | | |
| ↓ | Danmark Parish, southeast of Uppsala | Danmark Church | 14th and 15th century | | |
| ↓ | Helsingborg | St. Mary (Sankta Maria kyrka) | | | |
| ↓ | Helsingborg | Kärnan | 1320 | in 1893/94 restored with some alterations | |
| ↑ | Lena Parish, north of Uppsala | Lena Church | Circa 1300, possibly consecrated in 1303 | 18th century alterations including plastering of the exterior walls and addition of a burial vault | |
| ↓ | Lund | St. Peter's Priory Church (S:t Peters klosterkyrka) | Circa 1300 | | |
| ↑ | Lund | Liberiet | 15th century | built as cathedral chapter's library | |
| | Lund | Krognoshuset | 14th century | | |
| ↓ | Malmö | St. Peter (Sankt Petri kyrka) | | | |
| ↓ | Malmö | Archbishops's court | 15th-century | outside altered and nowadays plastered | |
| ↑ | Malmö | Jörgen Kock's house | 1522-1524 | Largest private house in Malmö from the sixteenth century | |
| ↑ | Malmö | Kompanihuset | 1529 | | |
| ↓ | Ronneby | Holy Cross Church (Heliga Kors kyrka) | | | |
| ↑ | Sigtuna | St. Mary (Mariakyrkan) | Mid 13th century | | |
| ↓ | Skänninge | Vårfrukyrkan ("Church of Our Lady") | | | |
| ↑ | Skepptuna Parish, Stockholm County | Skepptuna Church | 13th to 15th centuries | | |
| ↓ | Skokloster north of Sigtuna | Skokloster Church (Sko klosters kyrka) | 13th century | Near Skokloster Castle, originally a convent church | |
| ↑ | Söderköping | St. Lawrence's Church (S:t Laurentii kyrka) | | | |
| ↓ | Sölvesborg | St. Nicholas' Church (S:t Nicolai kyrka) | 13th century | | |
| ↑ | Stockholm | Riddarholmen Church (Riddarholmskyrkan) | Late 13th century, major 15th, 16th, 17th, 18th and 19th century alterations | Burial church for many of the Swedish monarchs | |
| ↓ | Stockholm | Storkyrkan (St. Nicholas) | 13th-15th centuries | in 1736–1742 outside altered into Baroque to make it more similar to the Royal Palace; brick gothic interior preserved | |
| ↑ | Strängnäs | Strängnäs Cathedral | 1296 onwards | | |
| ↓ | Tensta Parish, north of Uppsala | Tensta Church | 13th century | Houses the earliest deliberate portrait (a fresco by Johannes Rosenrod) in Swedish art history | |
| ↑ | Tuna Parish, northeast of Uppsala | Tuna Church, Uppland | about 1300 | | |
| ↓ | Uppsala | Uppsala Cathedral | 1287–1435, major 18th and 19th century alterations | External appearance largely 19th century | |
| ↑ | Uppsala | Holy Trinity Church | Late 13th to 15th century | | |
| ↓ | Vadstena | Vadstena Abbey | mid 13th century, 14th century alterations | former royal palace, later a hospital, when handed over to the abbey in 1346 the building was "humbled" and the roof was lowered. | |
| ↑ | Vadstena | House of Mårten Skinnare | Late Middle Ages, 18th century alterations | The roof was lowered and the crow-stepped gables removed in the 18th century. | |
| ↓ | Västerås | Västerås Cathedral | 13th century, 14th and 15th century extensions and later alterations | Burial place of Eric XIV of Sweden | |
| ↑ | Växjö | Växjö Cathedral | 13th century, later alterations | | |
| ↑ | Vendel Parish, north of Uppsala | Vendel Church | Late 13th and early 14th century, possibly consecrated in 1310 | | |
| ↑ | Ystad | St. Mary's Church (Sankta Maria kyrka) | 13th to 15th century | | |
| ↑ | Ystad | Franciscan Monastery Church (St. Peter) (S:t Petri kyrka) | Late 13th to 15th century | | |
| ↑ | Ystad | Latin School (Latinskolan) | early 16th century | | |

Navigation: BELA • BEL • CZ • DK • ENG • EST • FIN • FRA • GER • HUNG • ITA • LAT • LIT • NL • POL • RUS • SK • SWE • SWI • UKR

=== Switzerland ===
Though brick generally is not typical for medieval Swiss architecture, there are also some Gothic brick buildings in Switzerland, and some more have disappeared.

| Place | Building | Main period of construction | Special features | Image |
|---|---|---|---|---|
| Estavayer-le-Lac | Chenaux Castle | 15th century | Two towers and parts of the gate tower | |
| Vufflens-le-Château, Vaud | Vufflens Castle | 15th century | | |

=== Ukraine ===
Except of Lutsk Castle, all buildings are not very far from the current Polish border, though Gothic buildings also can be found in Lviv and Stryi, some of them looking like plastered brick buildings.

| Place | Building | Main period of construction | Special features | Image |
|---|---|---|---|---|
| Nove Misto (Sambir Raion) | Roman Catholic Church | 1463–1512 | | |
| Drohobych | St-Bartholomew Church | 15th–16th centuries | former Roman Catholic palace church | |
| Lutsk | Lubart's Castle (Ukrainian: Луцький замок, Polish: Zamek w Łucku) | 14th and 15th century | the only Brick Gothic building in the Dniester basin, Lithuanian foundation | |
| Skelivka | St-Martin Church | 15th to early 16th century | Roman Catholic former palace church of Fulsztyn Castle | |
| Zymne | Zymne Monastery (Ukrainian: Зимненський монастир, Polish: Monaster Zaśnięcia Matki Bożej w Zimnem) | after 1495 | Orthodox foundation | |

Navigation: BELA • BEL • CZ • DK • ENG • EST • FIN • FRA • GER • HUNG • ITA • LAT • LIT • NL • POL • RUS • SK • SWE • SWI • UKR

== See also ==
- European Route of Brick Gothic

== Bibliography ==
- Angela Pfotenhauer, Florian Monheim, Carola Nathan: Backsteingotik. Monumente-Edition. Monumente-Publikation der Deutschen Stiftung Denkmalschutz, Bonn 2000, ISBN 3-935208-00-6
- Marianne Mehling (ed.): Knaurs Kulturführer in Farbe Estland, Lettland, Litauen. München 1993. ISBN 3-426-26608-3
- Marianne Mehling (ed.): Knaurs Kulturführer in Farbe: Finnland. München 1988. ISBN 3-426-26248-7
