= Turgenevo =

Turgenevo (Russian: Тургенево) is the name of several inhabited localities in Russia.

Urban localities

- Turgenevo, Republic of Mordovia, a work settlement in Ardatovsky District of the Republic of Mordovia; 54°51′N 46°20′E

Rural localities

- Turgenevo, Belogorsky District, Republic of Crimea, a selo in Belogorsky District of Republic of Crimea
- Turgenevo, Dzhankoysky District, Republic of Crimea, a selo in Dzhankoysky District of Republic of Crimea
- Turgenevo, Kaliningrad Oblast, a settlement in Turgenevsky Rural Okrug of Polessky District in Kaliningrad Oblast
- Turgenevo, Moscow Oblast, a village under the administrative jurisdiction of Domodedovo Town Under Oblast Jurisdiction in Moscow Oblast; 55°20′N 37°43′E
- Turgenevo, Primorsky Krai, a selo under the administrative jurisdiction of Lesozavodsk Town Under Krai Jurisdiction in Primorsky Krai
- Turgenevo, Saratov Oblast, a settlement in Atkarsky District of Saratov Oblast
- Turgenevo, Lipitskaya Rural Administration, Chernsky District, Tula Oblast, a village in Lipitskaya Rural Administration of Chernsky District in Tula Oblast
- Turgenevo, Turgenevskaya Rural Administration, Chernsky District, Tula Oblast, a village in Turgenevskaya Rural Administration of Chernsky District in Tula Oblast
- Turgenevo, Alexandrovsky District, Vladimir Oblast, a village in Alexandrovsky District of Vladimir Oblast
- Turgenevo, Melenkovsky District, Vladimir Oblast, a village in Melenkovsky District of Vladimir Oblast
- Turgenevo, Yaroslavl Oblast, a village in Sevastyantsevsky Rural Okrug of Breytovsky District in Yaroslavl Oblast

== See also ==
- Turgenevsky (rural locality), several rural localities in Russia
