= Tuna Church, Uppland =

Coordinates: 60°01′11″N 18°03′52″E

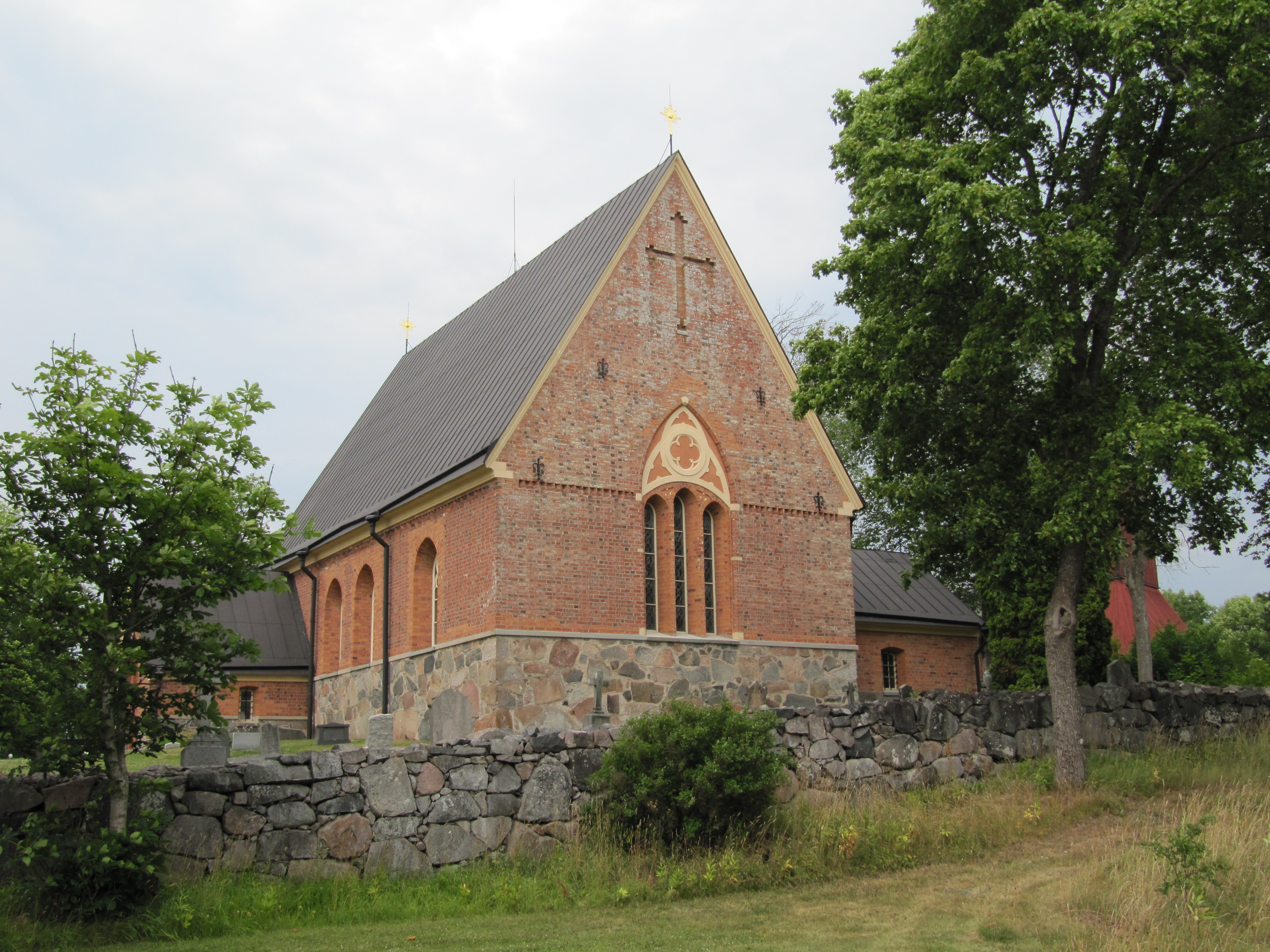
Tuna Church, Uppland

Tuna Church (Swedish: Tuna kyrka) is a medieval church located north-east of Uppsala in Uppsala County, Sweden. It is part of the Archdiocese of Uppsala (Church of Sweden).

== History and architecture ==
The church was probably built at the end of the 13th century, with the church porch and sacristy being later medieval extensions. The interior of the church was altered in the 15th century, when a vaulted ceiling replaced an earlier, wooden ceiling. The church was heavily renovated in the 1890s, when the medieval frescos were uncovered and insensitively restored. They were originally probably made by a local artist. The wooden belfry of the church was built in 1768.

The design of the church is typical for north-eastern Uppland, but the unusual use of brick rather than fieldstone as building material as well as the placement of the entrance at the western gable indicates influences from the type of architecture popular among mendicant orders.

The church still contains several medieval items: a couple of wooden sculptures of saints (including Bridget of Sweden), a decorated baptismal font and a paten of gilded copper. Other, post-Reformation furnishings include the pulpit (1674) and an richly decorated chasuble from 1662.
