= Daux =

- Commune
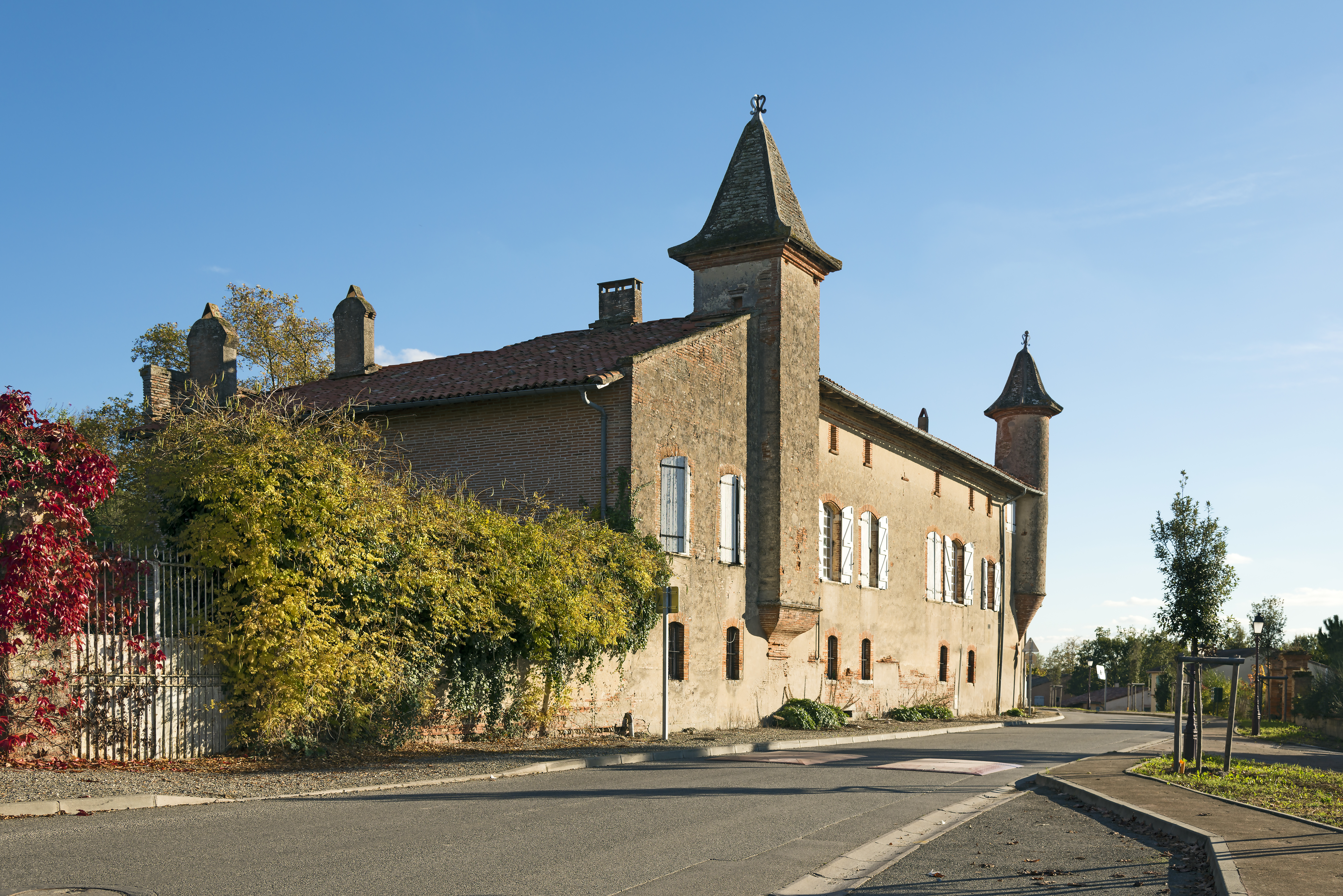
- Daux Peyrolade castel

- Coat of arms
- Location of Daux
- Location within France Location within Occitanie
- Coordinates: 43°41′41″N 1°16′12″E
- Country: France
- Region: Occitania
- Department: Haute-Garonne
- Arrondissement: Toulouse
- Canton: Léguevin

Government
  - Mayor (2020–2026): Patrice Lagorce
- Area^{1}: 16.88 km^{2} (6.52 sq mi)
- Elevation: 176 m (577 ft)
- Highest elevation: 193 m (633 ft)
- Lowest elevation: 119 m (390 ft)
- Population (2023): 2,643
  - Density: 156.6/km^{2} (405.5/sq mi)
- Time zone: UTC+01:00 (CET)
  - Summer (DST): UTC+02:00 (CEST)
- INSEE/Postal code: 31160 /31700
- ^{1} French Land Register data, which excludes lakes, ponds, glaciers > 1 km^{2} (0.386 sq mi or 247 acres) and river estuaries.

Daux (French pronunciation: [doks]; Occitan: Daus) is a commune in the Haute-Garonne department in southwestern France.

== Population ==
Historical population
Year	Pop.	±% p.a.
1968	577	—
1975	785	+4.50%
1982	1,059	+4.37%
1990	1,144	+0.97%
1999	1,253	+1.02%
2007	1,712	+3.98%
2012	2,141	+4.57%
2017	2,361	+1.98%
2023	2,643	+1.90%
Source: INSEE

== Monument ==
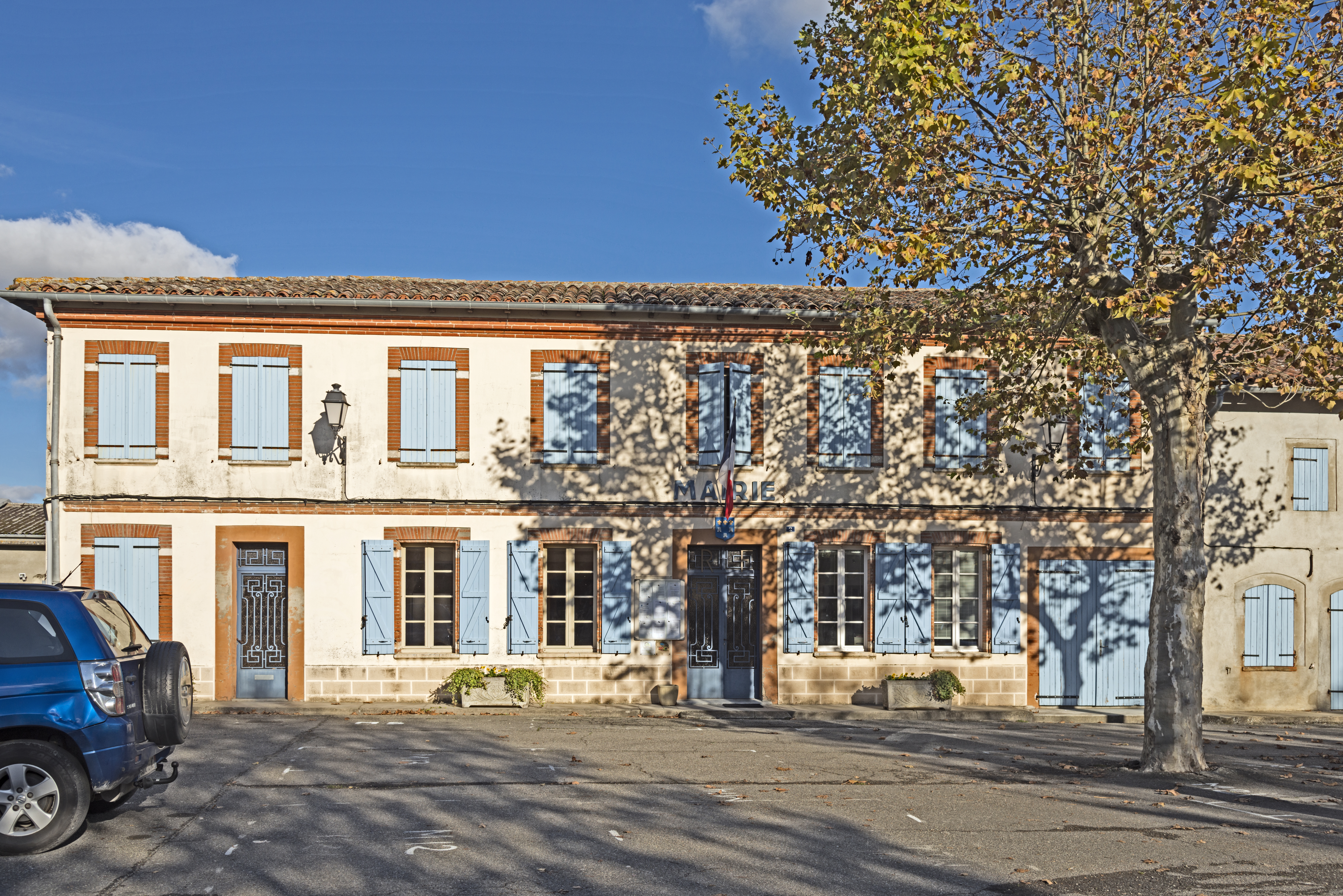
Town hall

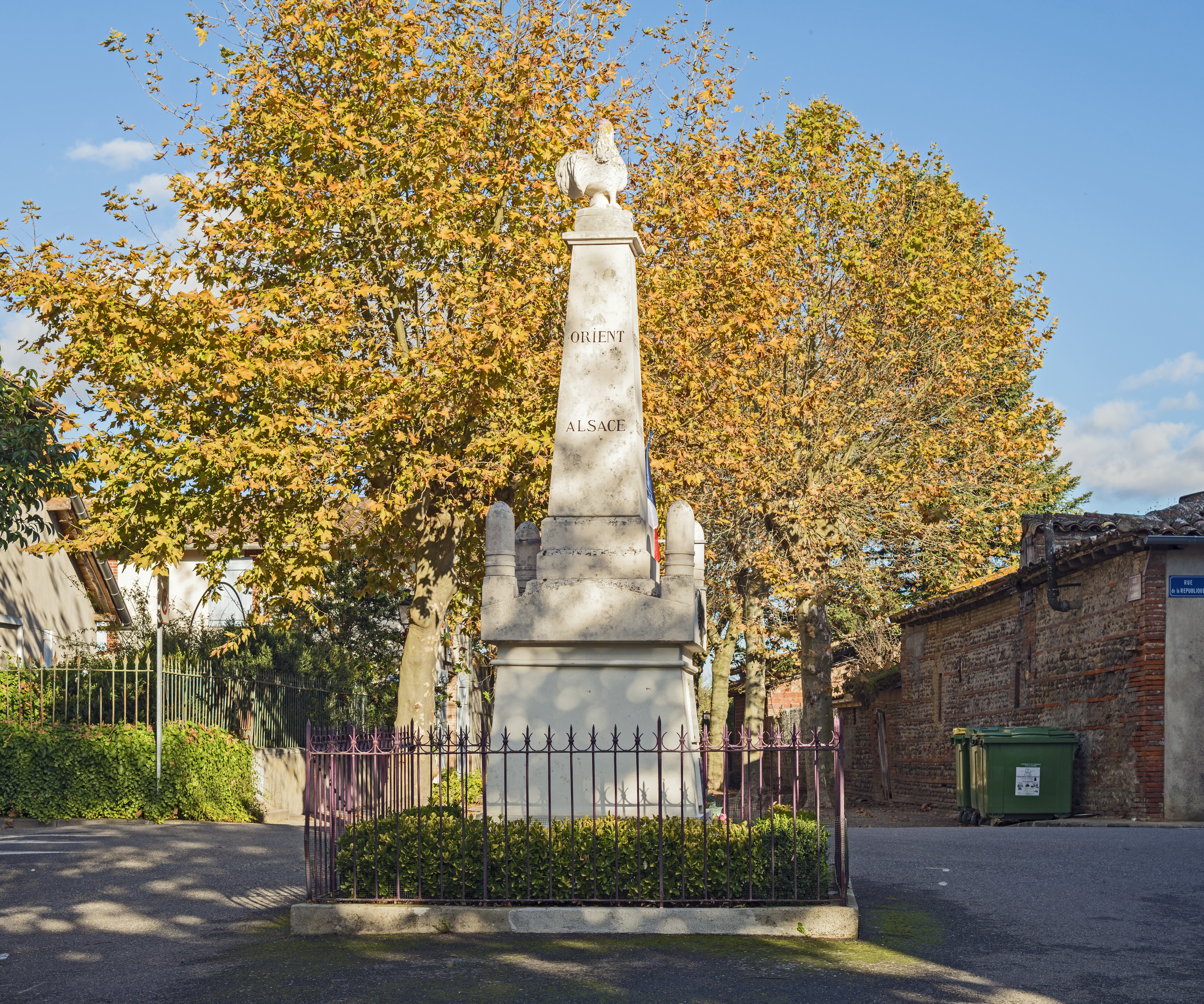
War memorial

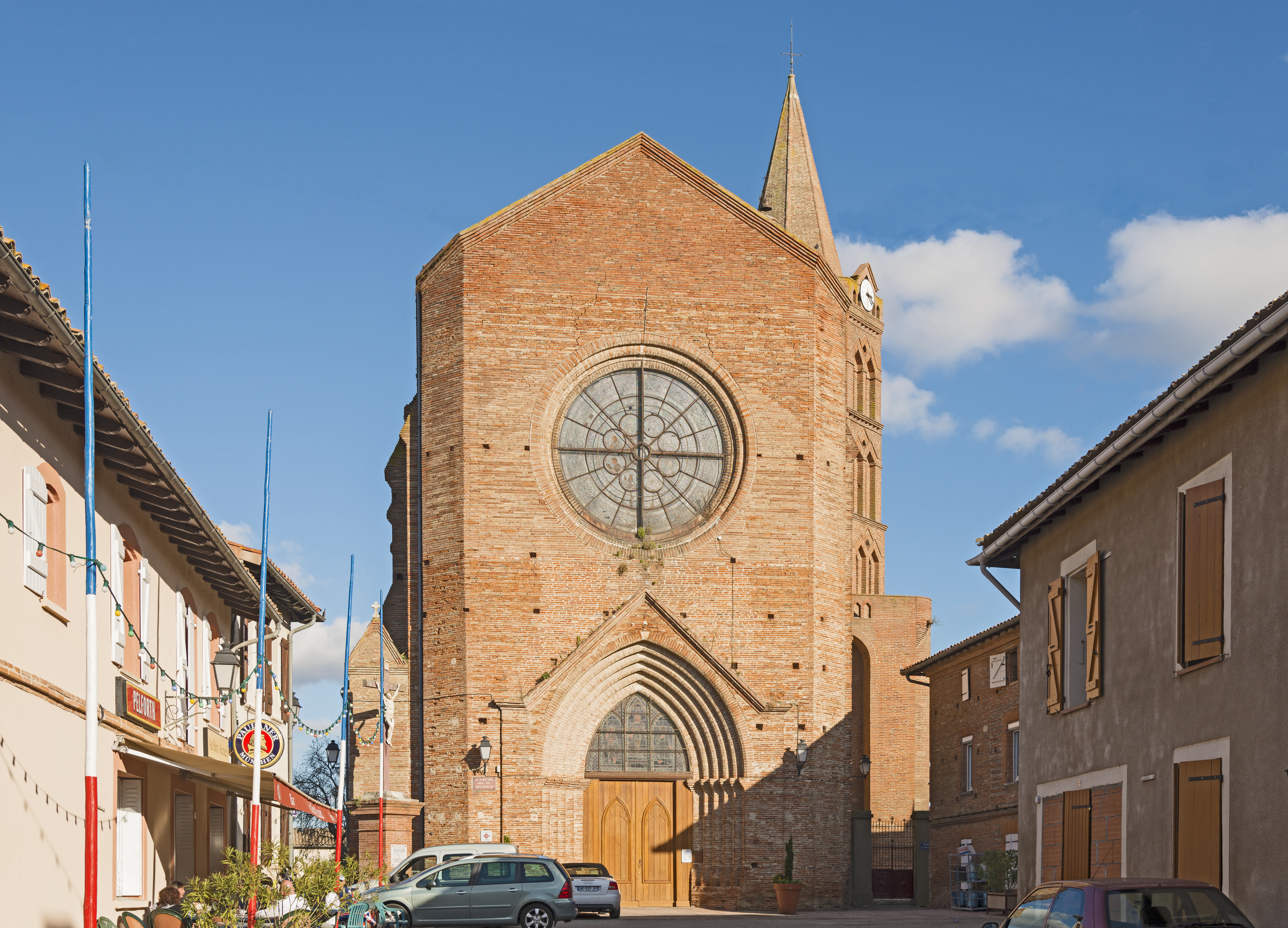
The St. Bartholomew's Church, facade

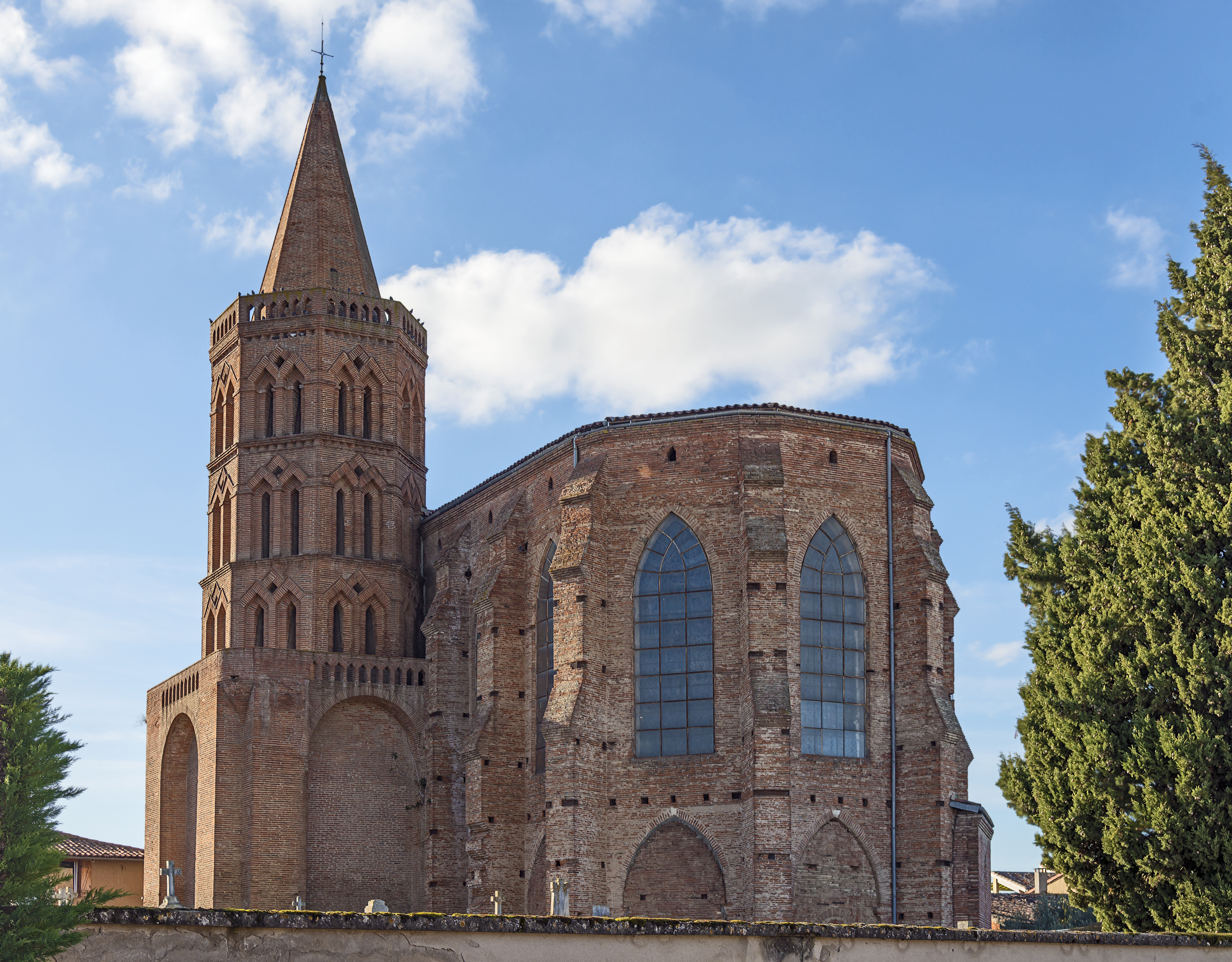
Apse

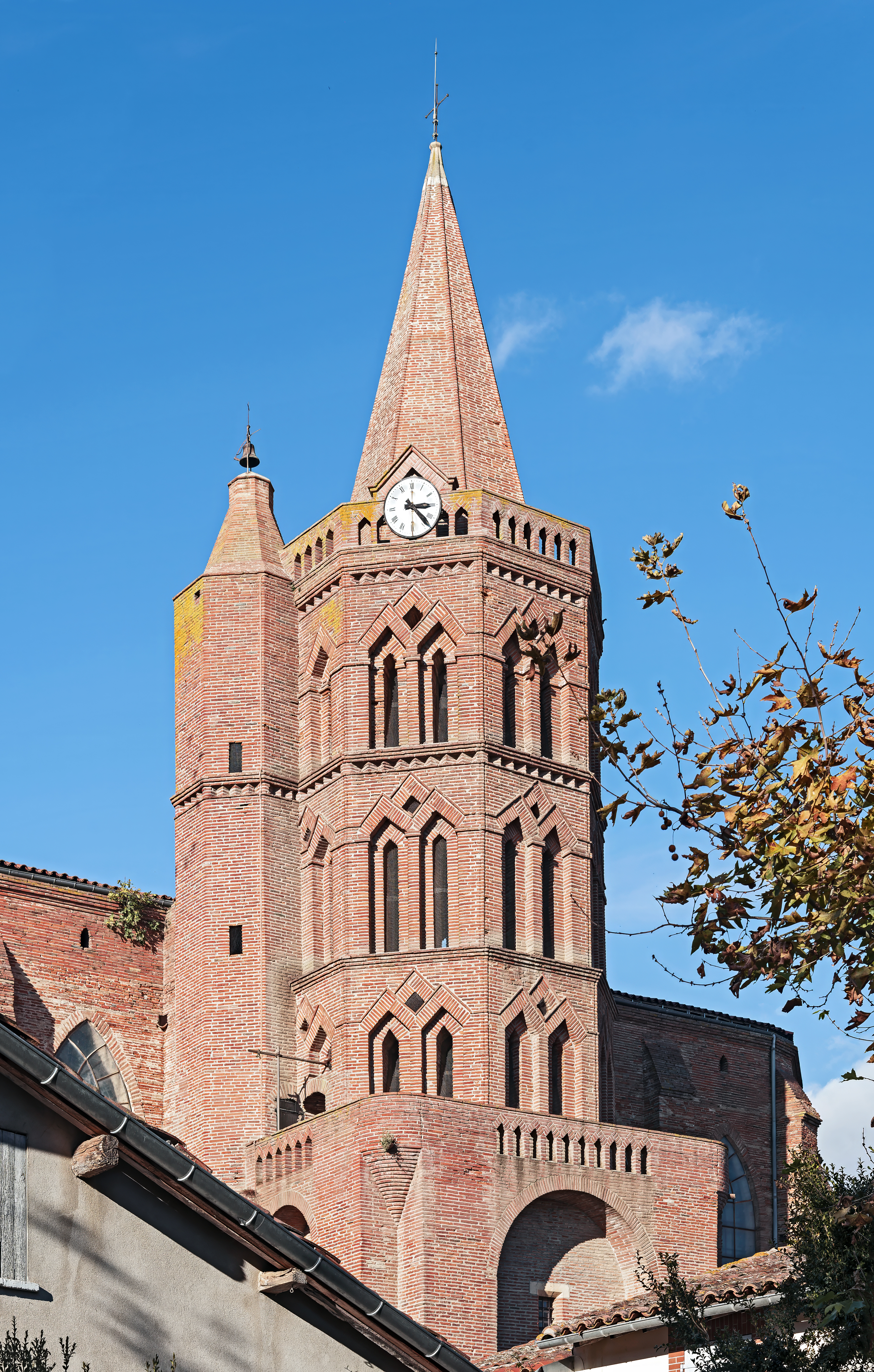
Bell tower

== See also ==
- Communes of the Haute-Garonne department
