= Råby =

- Location within Uppsala Location within Sweden
- Coordinates: 59°32′13″N 17°30′00″E
- Country: Sweden
- Province: Uppland
- County: Uppsala County
- Municipality: Håbo Municipality

Area
  - Total: 0.92 km^{2} (0.36 sq mi)

Population (31 December 2020)
  - Total: 971
  - Density: 1,100/km^{2} (2,700/sq mi)
- Time zone: UTC+1 (CET)
  - Summer (DST): UTC+2 (CEST)

Råby is a locality situated in Håbo Municipality, Uppsala County, Sweden with 885 inhabitants in 2010.
