= Palazzo del Capitano del Popolo, Reggio Emilia =

Coordinates: 44.69847°N 10.6312°E

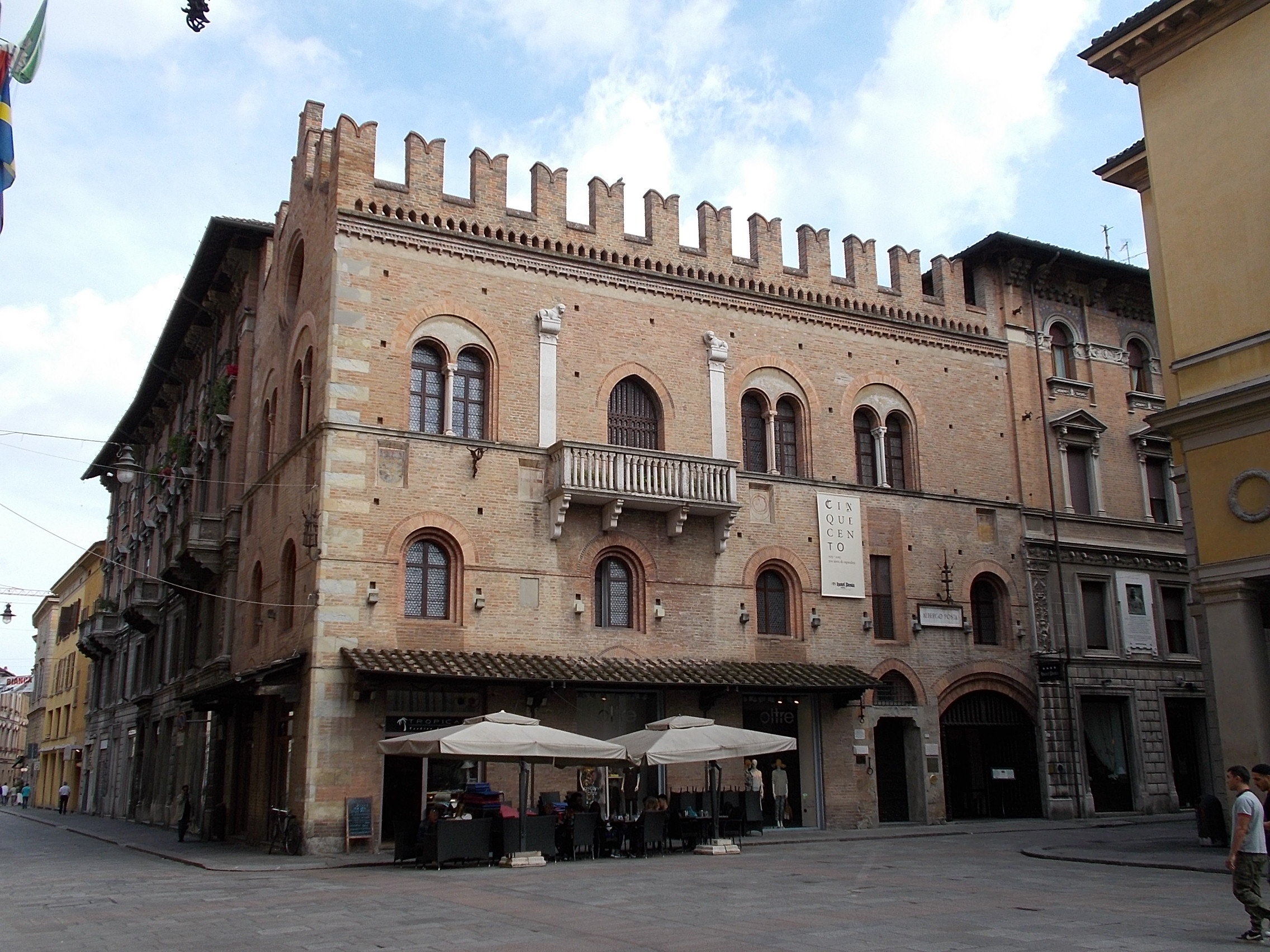
Main facade of Palace

The Palazzo del Capitano del Popolo (Palace of the Captain of the People) is a Gothic-style civic building located facing the piazza del Monte in the historic center of the town of Reggio Emilia in Italy.

The structure was erected in 1280 as the home and office of the town captain, who was required to be a foreigner representing the Lords of the Duchy. This position was abrogated in 1326. The building was refurbished in 1432. In 1515 the building housed the Ospizio del Cappello Rosso or Red Hat Inn. In 1913 the Inn was modernized and became the Posta Hotel. It still houses a hotel. In 1920–1929, a further refurbishment attempted to restore the medieval appearance of the building.

Inside is the large meeting hall (Sala dei Difensori) in which city council meetings were held.
