= Pozharsky =

Pozharsky (masculine), Pozharskaya (feminine), or Pozharskoye (neuter) may refer to:

- Dmitry Pozharsky (1578–1642), Rurikid prince who helped bring the Time of Troubles to an end
- Ivan Pozharsky (died 1938), Soviet military commissar, Hero of the Soviet Union
- Semyon Pozharsky (died 1659), Rurikid prince and military commander
- Pozharsky District, a district of Primorsky Krai, Russia
- Pozharsky (inhabited locality) (Pozharskaya, Pozharskoye), name of several rural localities in Russia
- Pozharsky cutlet, Russian meat dish
