= Stepan Erzya =

Erzya sculptor (1876–1959)

Erzya and his 1942 work on a 2016 stamp sheet of Russia

Stepan Dmitrievich Erzia (Nefyodov) (Russian: Степа́н Дми́триевич Э́рьзя (Нефёдов); 8 November [O.S. 27 October] 1876 – 24 November 1959), also known as Stefan Erzia, was an Erzya sculptor who lived in Russia and Argentina. Erzya chose his pseudonym after the native ethnic group.

== Biography ==
He was born October 27, 1876, in the village Bayevo, Alatyrsky Uyezd, Simbirsk Governorate of Russian Empire. In 1892 his family moved to Alatyr; Stepan became an apprentice of various icon-painting studios. In 1893–1897 he lived in Kazan, previously at the joiner's shop, later he worked at P. A. Kovalinski's icon-painting studio in Kazan. That time Erzia decorated churches in the various cities and villages of the Volga area and attended Kazan Art School.

In 1902–1906 he studied at Moscow School of Painting, Sculpture and Architecture, participating in the exhibitions of the School's students. In 1906-1914 he lived in Italy and France. He took part in the exhibitions in Venice and Milan in 1909, in Paris in 1912.

In 1914 he returned to Russia and in 1918 he moved to Yekaterinburg where he created his monumental works of art. In 1921 he moved to Novorossiysk, then to Batumi. Living there, he created portraits of Lenin, Marx and Engels, many cultural workers of Georgia. In 1923 he lived in Baku, where he created in monumental genre.

In 1926 the Soviet government took a decision to send Stepan Erzia abroad "to spread the knowledge of the Soviet art". He came to Paris again. Again his one-man shows were sponsored followed by positive response in the Western press.

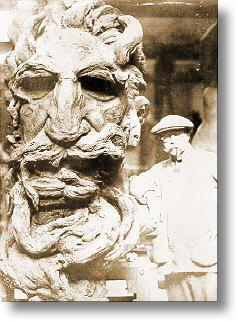
Erzya by his sculpture Moses in Buenos Aires

In 1927–1950 he worked in Buenos Aires, creating portraits there of Lenin, Moses, Tolstoy, and Beethoven.

There Erzya developed a project of transforming entire mountains in the Andes into monuments to the heroes of the war for independence. The local authorities approved his plan, but failed to finance its implementation.

While in Argentina, Erzya invented a method of processing some locally grown, extra-hard types of wood: algarrobo and quebracho.

In 1950 he returned to the Soviet Union. In 1956 he was awarded with the Order of the Red Banner of Labour.

Stepan Erzya died in 1959 in Moscow and was buried in Saransk, the capital of Mordovia.

On 26 June 1958 Erzya Mordovian Museum of Visual Arts (Russian: Мордовский республиканский музей изобразительных искусств им. С.Д.Эрьзи) was opened in Saransk. The museum has the most complete collection of Erzya works (204 works).

== Major works ==
Horror, Despair, Courage, A Chilean Lady, A Parisian Lady in a Hat, Head of a Mordvin Woman, Lev Tolstoy, Beethoven, Moses and Christ.

== See also ==
- List of Russian artists
