= Bikin National Park =

National park in Russia

- Russian: Бикин
- IUCN category II (national park)
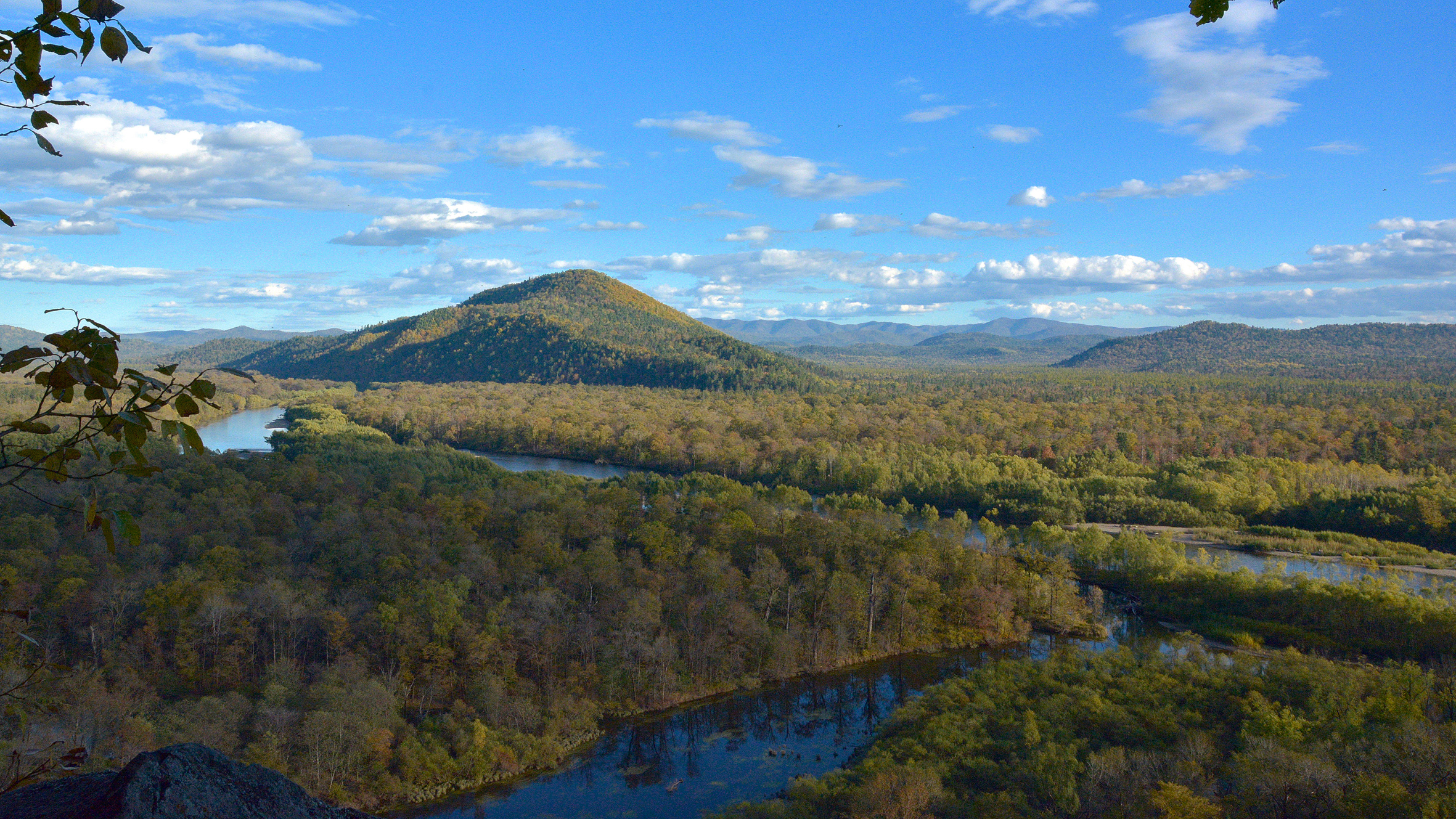
- Bikin River Valley

- Location within Russia
- Location: Primorsky Krai
- Nearest city: Khabarovsk
- Coordinates: 46°40′N 136°00′E
- Area: 1,160,000 hectares (2,866,422 acres; 11,600 km^{2}; 4,479 sq mi)
- Established: 2015
- Governing body: FGBU "Bikin"

UNESCO World Heritage Site
- Official name: Bikin River Valley
- Type: Natural
- Criteria: x
- Designated: 2001 (25th session), 2018 (Extension)
- Reference no.: 766bis
- Region: Europe and North America

Bikin National Park (Russian: Национальный парк «Бикин») was created on November 3, 2015 to protect the largest remaining old-growth mixed forest in the Northern Hemisphere, as well as the territory of 10% of all Amur tigers in the wild. The park was also created for the purpose of protecting the forest culture of the 600 indigenous inhabitants of the Bikin River Basin living in the territory - Udeghes and Nanai people. Because of its size for pristine forest, and its characterization as a "temperate rain forest", it has an important status as a center for biodiversity of both plants and animals. The park sits in the administrative region of Pozharsky District, in Primorsky Krai in the Russian Far East on the west slope of the Sikhote-Alin mountains. The Bikin River Valley is also a World Heritage site.

== Topography ==
The Bikin River flows west down the west slope of the central Sikhote-Alin, linking the Amur River basin on the west to the Primorsky ("Maritime") region on the east. The drainage basin of the Bikin runs through isolated mountainous territory, covered in mixed conifer and deciduous forest, emptying into the Ussuri River and ultimately the Amur and the Sea of Okhotsk. With over 1,160,000 hectares (4,500 sq mi) of undeveloped territory, the unbroken forest provides a refuge for large numbers of vulnerable species.

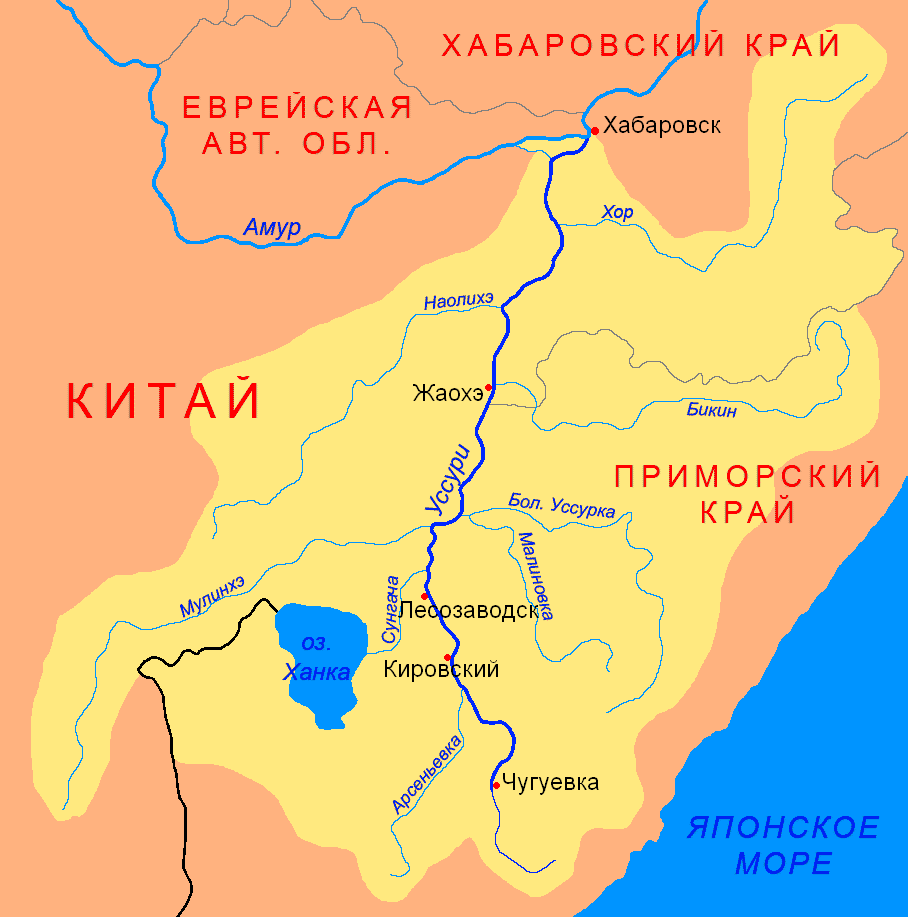
The Bikin River flows west across the middle of the Sikhote-Alin

Recent reviews by park managers record 51 species of mammals (moose, wild boar, roe deer, red deer, musk deer, tiger, sable, mink, muskrat, Ussuri brown and Ussuri black bear, etc.) and 194 species of birds.

== Climate and ecoregion ==
Bikin is in the Ussuri broadleaf and mixed forests ecoregion. The official climate designation for the Bikin area is "Humid continental climate - Cool summer subtype" (Köppen climate classification Dwb), with large seasonal temperature differentials, cool summers (warmest month less than 22 degrees C), and cold winters.

Khabarovsk, (Russia)

Climate chart (precipitation, max. and min. temperature)
J	F	M	A	M	J	J	A	S	O	N	D
0.5 2 −13	0.4 10 −8	0.7 29 9	1.6 49 25	2.4 64 42	3.2 75 53	5.3 79 61	5.4 75 58	3.5 65 47	2.1 48 32	1 24 10	0.7 6 −7
- █ Average max. and min. temperatures in °F
- █ Precipitation totals in inches
- Source: climate-date.org
Metric conversion
J	F	M	A	M	J	J	A	S	O	N	D
12 −17 −25	11 −12 −22	18 −2 −13	41 10 −4	60 18 6	82 24 12	134 26 16	137 24 15	89 18 9	52 9 0	25 −4 −12	17 −14 −22
- █ Average max. and min. temperatures in °C
- █ Precipitation totals in mm

== Park Developments ==
Along with nature conservation and eco-tourism, the park's infrastructure is being developed in ways designed to protect the forest-based lifestyle of the Udeghe and Nanai people. An estimated 600 indigenous inhabitants of the area live a traditional lifestyle of fishing, hunting, and gathering pine nuts. In the course of zoning the park for different uses (conservation, scientific study, eco-tourism, etc.), the government has committed to allowing 68% of the land to remain available for the traditional uses of the indigenous people.

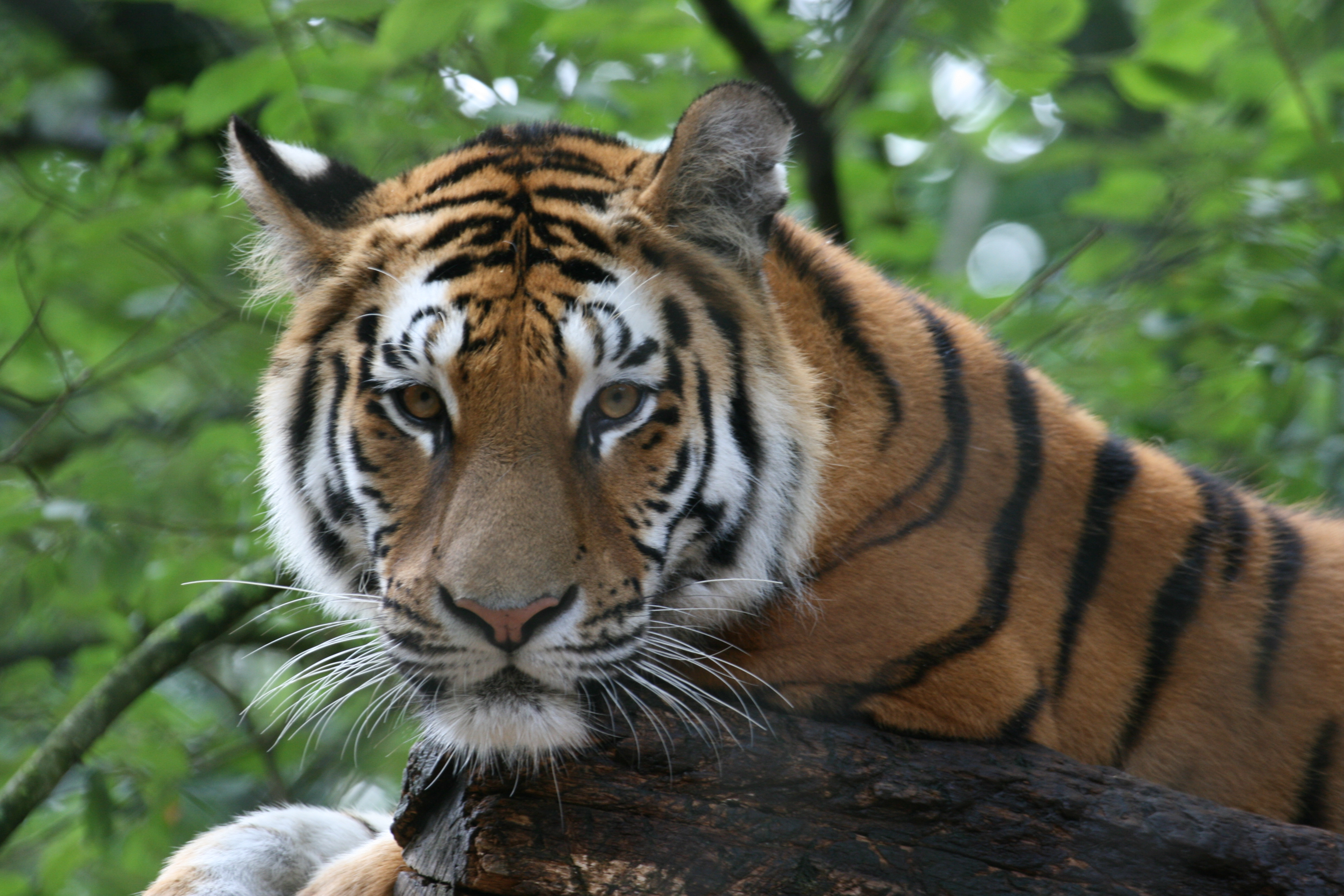
There are 30 - 35 wild Amur tigers in the Bikin River basin

In 2018, the pre-existing "Central Sikhote-Alin" World Heritage site was extended by inclusion of 1,160,469 hectares of the Bikin National Park. After the expansion, the whole site was renamed "Bikin River Valley".

== See also ==
- Protected areas of Russia
- Temperate rainforests of the Russian Far East
