= Vaślejĕ Mitta =

- Born: March 5, 1908; Bolshiye Arabosy, Chuvashia
- Died: June 10, 1957 (aged 49); Bolshiye Arabosy, Chuvashia
- Occupations: writer, poet and translator
- Writing career
- Notable works: «Кӑмӑл» (Mood, 1932) «Такмаксем» (Ditty, 1934) «Кӑмӑлтан» (From the Heart, 956) «Кӑмӑлӑмпа шухӑшӑм» (My mood and My dream, 1959)

Vaślejĕ Mitta or Vasiliy Yegorovich Mitta (Russian: Василий Егорович Митта, Chuvash: Митта Ваҫлейӗ, March 5, 1908 Bolshiye Arabosy, Simbirsk, Russian Empire - June 10, 1957; Bolshiye Arabosy, Chuvash ASSR, USSR) was a Soviet Chuvash poet and novelist, translator, essayist and author of the literary-critical articles.

== Life and education ==
Mitta was born in Bolshiye Arabosy (Большие Арабуси) settlement (present-day the village of Pervomayskoye of Batyrevsky District, Chuvashia) of Buinsky Uyezd in the Simbirsk Governorate of the Russian Empire to a Chuvash peasant family.

In 1924 he entered the Ulyanovsk Chuvash Pedagogical College (Ульяновский чувашский педагогический техникум) and was educated at this technical school in Ulyanovsk. Following his graduation in 1928 he began working as a teacher in several schools, before starting work in the newspaper Паянхи сас. In 1937 he was arrested. In 1955-1957 he worked in the literary journal Tăvan Atăl (Тӑван Атӑл).

== Works ==
As a child he developed an interest in the poetry of Alexander Pushkin and the stories of Nikolai Gogol. He began to write Chuvash poetry, and was first published in 1925, and continued to appear in Chuvash newspapers and magazines. His works centered around the notion of a new concept of his homeland. He also translated works of famous Russian writers and poets. He was repressed in 1937 as part of the Great Purge, finally being released in 1954. He died three years later.

== Memory ==
- Memorial Plaque (Cheboksary)
- Flowers at the memorial plaque of Vasil Mitta
- Chuvashia. Literary section

== Links ==
- Youtube.com'ра вырнăçтарнă Арсений Тарасов ӳкернĕ "Ваçлей Митта" фильмĕн сыпăкĕ.
- Митта Ваçлейĕн сăввисем
- В Чувашии отмечают вековой юбилей поэта и публициста Василия Митты
- Per aspera ad astra…, или Зăлтăр витĕр зул курнать…, или Дорога через звезду…(Лирический герой
- Василий Егорович Миттана асăнса...
- ВКонтакте
- ПОЧЕМУ ЧИНОВНИКИ ЧУВАШИИ СО СТАЛИНСКИХ ВРЕМЕН И ДО СИХ ПОР ПРЕСЛЕДУЮТ МИТТУ?
