= Yuri Orlov (zoologist) =

Russian paleontologist (1893–1966)

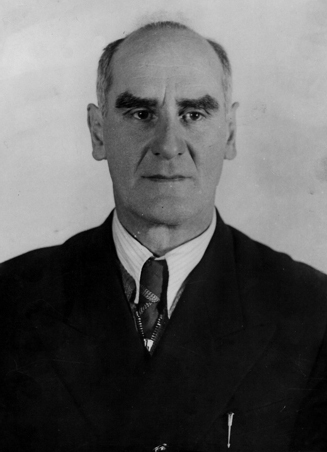
- Born: Yuri Aleksandrovich Orlov; 12 June 1893; Tomyshevo village, Syzransky Uyezd, Simbirsk Governorate, Russian Empire
- Died: 2 October 1966 (aged 73); Moscow, Soviet Union
- Education: Petrograd State University
- Awards: Order of Lenin; Order of the Red Banner of Labour; Lenin Prize
- Scientific career
- Fields: Paleontology, zoology
- Workplaces: Perm State University, Moscow State University, Paleontological Institute, The Academy of Sciences of the USSR
- Doctoral advisor: Alexei Zavarzin

Yuri Aleksandrovich Orlov (Russian: Ю́рий Алекса́ндрович Орло́в; June 12, 1893 — October 2, 1966) — was a Russian and Soviet zoologist and paleontologist. Academician of the Academy of Sciences of the Soviet Union (from 1960, corresponding member since 1953).

His father was Aleksandr Fyodorovich Orlov (1855–1940), member of Narodnaya Volya, official of Udel department of Vologda and Arkhangelsk Governorates. His mother was Vera Pavlovna Tumarkina (1862–1899), from Bessarabian Jewish merchants family, the older sister of Anna Tumarkin. She served as an otolaryngology doctor at Saint Petersburg Conservatory.

Orlov studied zoology and anatomy at the State University of St. Petersburg under Alexei Zavarzin. He then taught from 1916 to 1924 at the Medical Faculty of the University of Perm, during the Russian Civil War turmoil under some very difficult conditions. and from 1924 to 1935 at the Institute for Brain Research and the Military Medical Academy in Leningrad. At that time, he studied the nervous system of arthropods. From 1925, he devoted his research interests to paleontology, the old love of his youth, and joined Aleksei Borisyak. He taught at the Mining Academy in Leningrad and from 1939 at the Lomonosov State University in Moscow.

He was the chief editor of a fifteen-volume series "Fundamentals of paleontology." In 1967, he was awarded the Lenin Prize posthumously.

Director of the Paleontological Institute, The Academy of Sciences of the USSR (1945–1966).

In 1955, he signed a Letter of three hundred against notorious Stalinist Trofim Lysenko.

== Legacy ==
Moscow Paleontological Museum is named after him in Moscow, Russia.

== Scientific works ==
Main publications in other than Russian languages:

- Orlov J. A. Die Innervation des Darmes der Insecten: (Larven von Lamellicorniern) // Z. wiss. Zool. 1924. Bd 122. H. 3/4. S. 452-502.
- Orlov J. A. Die Innervation des Darmes des Flußkrebses // Z. Mikrosk.-anat. Forsch. 1925. Bd 4. H. 1. S. 101-148.
- Orlov J. A. Über den histologischen Bau der Ganglien des Mundmagennervensystems der Insekten // Ibid. Bd 2. H. 1. S. 39-110.
- Orlov J. A. Über den histologischen Bau der Ganglien des Mundmagennervensystems der Crustaceen // Z. wiss. Biol. 1928. Bd 8. H. 3. S. 493-541.
- Orlov J. A. Über einige neue obersilurische Favositiden aus Ferghana // Centbl. Mineral. Geol. Paläont. 1931. Abt. B. 500-507.
- Orlov J. A. Short guide to the exhibition for the XVII International geological congress // M.; L.: Acad. Sci. USSR, 1937. 29 p.
- Orlov J. A. Tertiary mammals of Kazakhstan // Journal of Mammalogy, 1938. Vol. 19. N 4. P. 475-477.
- Orlov J. A. Perunium ursogulo Orlov a new gigantic extinct mustelid: (A contributribution to the morphology of the skull and brain and to the phylogeny of mustelidae) // Acta zool. 1948. Bd 29. H. 1. S. 63-105.
- Orlov J. A. Florentino Ameghino y su contribución al desarrollo de la paleontología de los vertebrados // Homenaje a Ameghino en Moscú. Buenos Aires: IRC Argentina-URSS, 1954. P. 5-25.
- Orlov J. A. A note on palaeontological institutions in the USSR // J. paleontol. Soc. India. 1956. Vol. 1. P. 92-93.
- Orlov J. A. Les deinocephales des couches permiennes supérieures de la moyenne Volga // Problèmes actuels de paléontologie: [Paris, 18-23 Avril, 1955]. Paris, 1956, p. 59-67. (Coll. Intern. Centre nat. rech. sci.; № 60).
- Orlov J. A. Principal results of investigations in the palaeontology of vertebrates in the USSR // Congresso geológico internacional (XX ses. México, 1956): Resúmenes de los trabajos presentados. México: Talleres, 1956. P. 121.
- Orlov J. A. Brithopodidae // Traité de Paléontologie: T. 6. Vol. 1. Paris: Masson et Compagnie, 1961. P. 70-79.
- Orlov J. A. Deuterosauridae Seeley, 1894 // Ibid. P. 271-275.
- Orlov J. A. Venyukovioidea // Ibid. P. 279-282.
- Orlov J. A. Dans le monde des animaux anciens: Étude de la paléontologie des vertébrés. Paris: Bureau rech. geôl. minieres, 1962. 123 p.
