= Mikhail Khvatkov =

Mikhail Petrovich Khvatkov
- Михаил Петрович Хватков
- Born: 24 November 1925; Gryaznukha, Simbirsky Uyezd, Simbirsk Governorate, Soviet Union
- Died: 25 June 1944 (aged 18) near Uzrechye, Beshankovichy Raion, Vitebsk Oblast
- Military career
- Allegiance: Soviet Union
- Branch: Red Army
- Service years: 1943–1944
- Rank: Efreitor
- Unit: 67th Guards Rifle Division
- Conflicts: World War II; Belgorod-Kharkov Offensive Operation; Vitebsk-Orsha Offensive †
- Awards: Hero of the Soviet Union; Order of Lenin; Medal "For Courage"

Mikhail Petrovich Khvatkov (Russian: Михаил Петрович Хватков; 24 November 1925 – 25 June 1944) was a Red Army Efreitor and posthumous Hero of the Soviet Union. Khvatkov was posthumously awarded the title for his actions in the Vitebsk–Orsha Offensive, where he ferried troops and equipment across the Western Dvina. He was killed while crossing the river.

== Early life ==
Khvatkov was born on 24 November 1925 in the village of Gryaznukha (now part of Ulyanovsk) in Simbirsk Governorate to a peasant family. He graduated from seventh grade and worked on a farm.

== World War II ==
Khvatkov was drafted into the Red Army in February 1943. He received sapper training and arrived on the Voronezh Front as a replacement with the 67th Guards Rifle Division, where he was assigned to the 76th Guards Separate Engineer Battalion. Khvatkov fought in the Belgorod-Khar'kov Offensive Operation in August and the Sumy-Pryluky Offensive in September. After the end of the offensive on 30 September, the division became part of Reserve of the Supreme High Command (Stavka Reserve). In October 1943 it was withdrawn from the reserve and became part of the 2nd Baltic Front. Until February 1944 the division fought in the Nevel area. During a river crossing near Ignatenki village, Khvatkov repaired a bridge destroyed by German artillery under heavy fire. On 2 March Khvatkov was awarded the Medal "For Courage" for his actions.

At the end of February the division became part of the 1st Baltic Front, with which it fought in the Vitebsk–Orsha Offensive, part of Operation Bagration, in late June 1944. During the breakthrough of German defenses in the village of Sirotino Khvatkov reportedly cleared two paths through German minefields and barbed wire. He reportedly defused 64 mines. Khvatkov was reportedly among the first to reach the Western Dvina near the village of Uzrechye and quickly built a raft from logs and under heavy German fire crossed to the opposite bank with a heavy machine gun. During the day under heavy fire Khvatkov ferried troops and equipment over the river. He reportedly ferried 60 soldiers, eight heavy machine guns and 30 boxes of ammunition over the river. On the return crossing Khvatkov reportedly ferried seven wounded soldiers back across the river. On 25 June he was killed during the crossing. Khvatkov was buried in a mass grave in Uzrechye. On 24 March 1945 he was posthumously awarded the title Hero of the Soviet Union and the Order of Lenin.

A street in Ulyanovsk is named for Khvatkov. A monument was built in the village of Gryaznaukha near the building of the Lugovskoy Primary School, where he studied. The school was renamed in his honor in 1965 and was later declared an object of cultural heritage. There is also a plaque on the school building.
