= House of Denis Davydov in Bolshoy Znamensky Lane =

- Дом Дениса Давыдова в Большом Знаменском переулке (Russian)
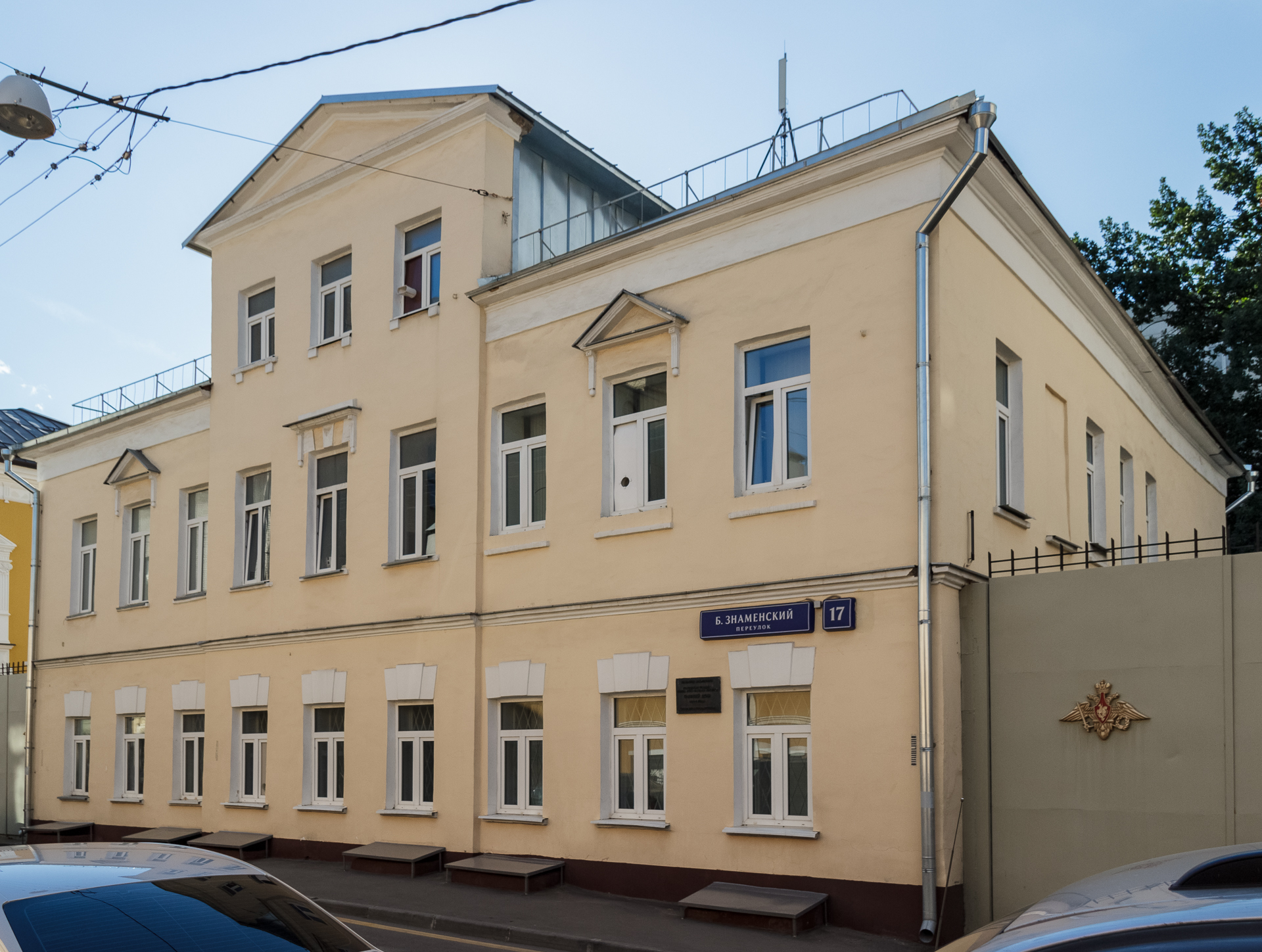
- Interactive map of the House of Denis Davydov in Bolshoy Znamensky Lane area

General information
- Location: Moscow, Bolshoy Znamensky lane, house 17
- Coordinates: 55°44′51″N 37°36′07″E

The house of Denis Davydov in Bolshoy Znamensky Lane (Russian: Дом Дениса Давыдова в Большом Знаменском переулке) is a mansion beginning of the 19th century in the center of Moscow (Bolshoy Znamensky lane, house 17). In this house from 1826 to 1830 lived the hero of the Patriotic War of 1812, Major-General Denis Davydov. Currently, the mansion belongs to the Ministry of Defense of the Russian Federation. The house of Denis Davydov has the status of an object of cultural heritage of federal significance.

== History and description ==
A small mansion in Bolshoy Znamensky Lane was built shortly after the fire of 1812. In 1826 Denis Davydov bought it in the name of his wife, and lived there until 1830. According to the confessions, in this house lived Major-General Dionysius Vasilyevich Davydov, his wife Sofya Nikolaevna and the children Vasily, Nikolai, Dionysius and Achilles. Presumably, in this house of Denis Davydov A. Pushkin visited. In 1830 the Davydovs moved out of this house, and in 1833 they sold it. In 1835 the Davydovs purchased a palace house on Prechistenka, 17.

The two-story mansion was practically not reconstructed from the beginning of the 19th century. The central part of it ends with a small mezzanine with a low triangular pediment. The side parts at the level of the first floor were originally trimmed by a rust. Three windows of the second floor are decorated with sandrikami.
