= Ivan Pozharsky =

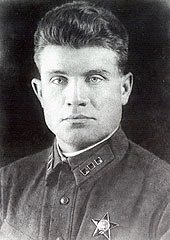
- Ivan Pozharsky, Hero of Soviet Union
- Born: 27 August 1905; Ardatov, Ardatovsky Uyezd, Simbirsk Governorate, Russian Empire
- Died: 7 August 1938 (aged 32) near Khasan Lake, USSR

Ivan Pozharsky (Russian: Иван Алексеевич Пожарский; 27 August 1905 – 7 August 1938) was a Soviet military commissar and posthumous Hero of Soviet Union.

He was born in 1905 in Ardatov, in the Ardatovsky Uyezd of the Simbirsk Governorate of the Russian Empire (now Mordovia, Russia). Pozharsky joined the Communist Party in 1926. He served in the Red Army as a military commissar. He died in Battle of Lake Khasan near Zaozyornaya Sopka and Khasan Lake after being wounded while rallying his men to attack. Pozharsky continued to fight despite his wounds and died at the height of the battle. He was buried in Kraskino (now Khasansky District).

District and village in Primorsky Krai, and streets in a few Russian cities, were named after him.
