= Lyudmila Narbekova =

Russian painter and fashion designer (born 1964)

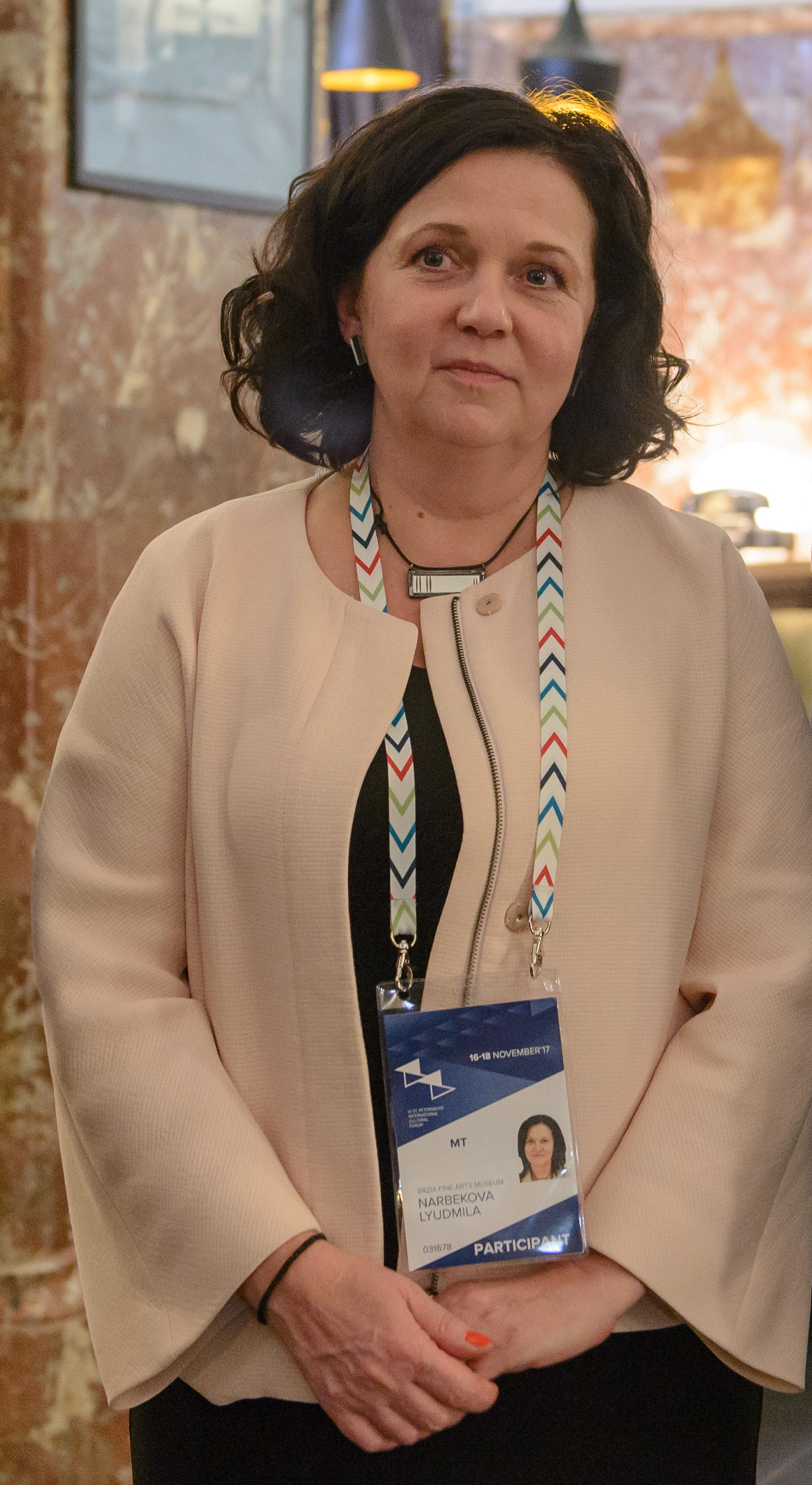
- in 2017
- Born: 7 or 10 April 1964; Saransk
- Occupation: museum director
- Employer: Mordovian Erzia Museum of Visual Arts

Lyudmila Narbekova (born 7 April 1964) is a Russian painter and fashion designer who runs the Mordovian Erzia Museum of Visual Arts.

== Life ==
Narbekova was born in Saransk. She is the youngest of three sisters. In early childhood, together with a classmate, they enrolled in an art school. Her parents, were unconnected with art, did they not oppose her interests. Lyudmila had a good education and engaged in other activities including the production of school wall newspapers. She helped to prepare anatomical drawings for her elder sister, who was studying medicine.

She studied at Leningrad University after she graduated with honours from the Saransk Art School.

In 2004 she became the director of the Mordovian Erzia Museum of Visual Arts. The museum is named for the sculptor Stepan Erzia who was born in Saransk. The museum contains valuable paintings including, notably, paintings by the museum's director.

Her museum joined in with the Night at the Museum theme and they were surprised by the level of interest when they opened the museum to night time visitors. The museum continued the idea as an annual event.

In 2018 she hosted a visit by Princess Takamado who was the first member of the Japanese Royal family to visit Russia since during the first world war in 1916. The Princess was in Saransk for the FIFA world cup but she took time to visit Narbekova's museum. They toured art by Nicholas Roerich and discussed their common interest of painting. She toured the museum and was given two silk dead scarves of which one was by Narbekova.

In 2019 her own solo exhibition opened titled the "River of Time". The exhibition opened on 10 April which was her 55th birthday. The 350 visitors on the first day included Anatoly Mikhailovich Chushkin who was Moldova's minister of culture and the head of the city's administration, Vladimir Valerievich Pankov.
