= Zavarzin =

Zavarzin (Russian: Заварзин) is a Russian masculine surname, its feminine counterpart is Zavarzina. Notable people with the surname include:

- Alena Zavarzina (born 1989), Russian snowboarder
- Alexei Alexeivich Zavarzin (1886–1945), Soviet histologist and cell biologist
- Viktor Zavarzin (born 1948), Russian general and politician
