= Denis Davydov =

Russian soldier-poet

- Денис Давыдов
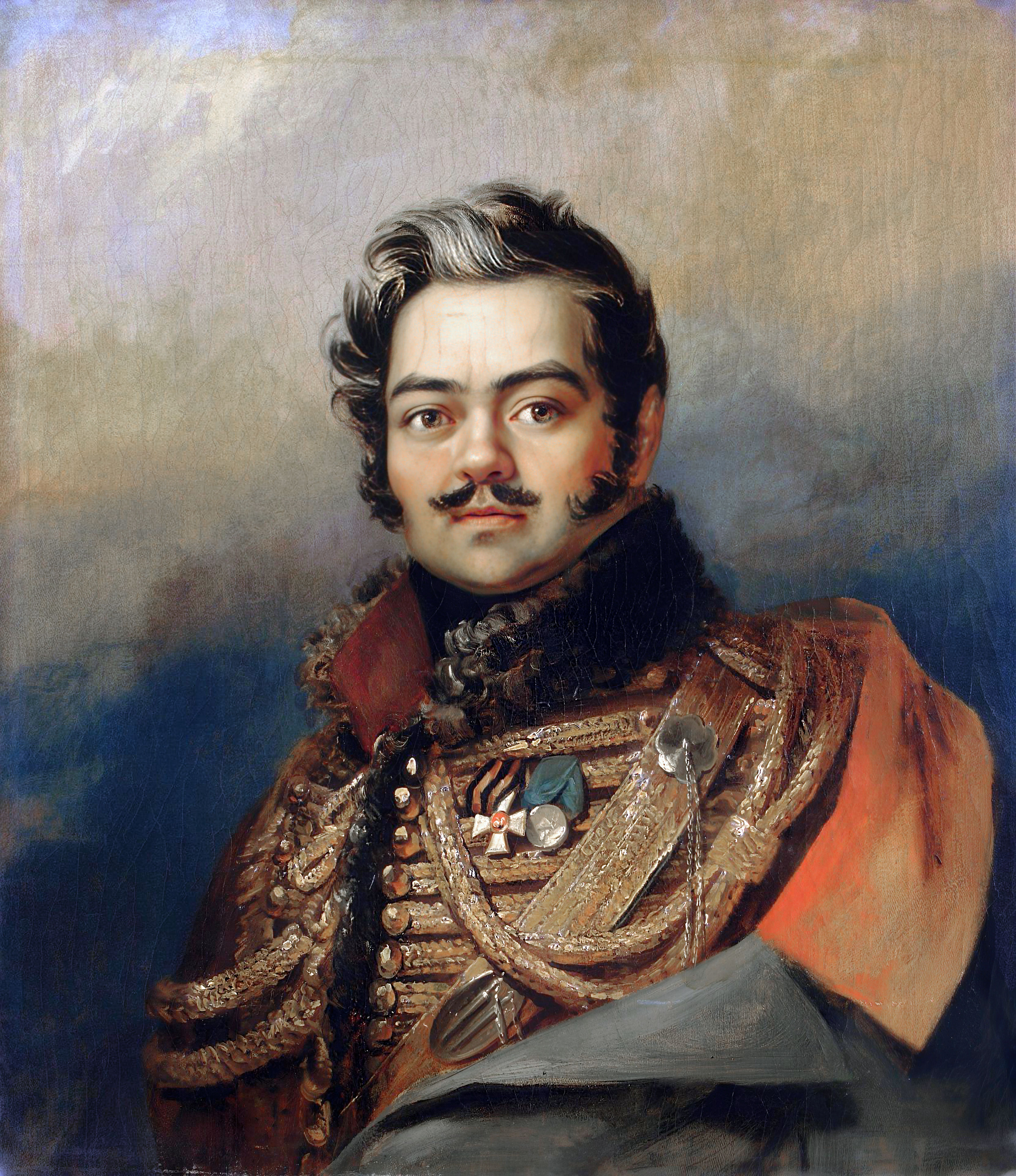
- Portrait by George Dawe
- Born: 27 July 1784; Moscow, Russian Empire
- Died: 4 May 1839 (aged 54); Syzransky Uyezd, Simbirsk Governorate, Russian Empire
- Known for: Hussar poetry Guerrilla Warfare

Denis Vasilyevich Davydov (Russian: Дени́с Васи́льевич Давы́дов, pronounced [dʲɪˈnʲis vɐˈsʲilʲjɪvʲɪdʑ dɐˈvɨdəf]; 27 July [O.S. 16 July] 1784 – 4 May [O.S. 22 April] 1839) was a Russian soldier-poet of the Napoleonic Wars who invented the genre of hussar poetry, characterised by hedonism and bravado. He used events from his own life to illustrate such poetry. He suggested and successfully pioneered guerrilla warfare in the Patriotic War of 1812 against Napoleon.

== Biography ==
Davydov stemmed from a family of Russian nobility with, as he claimed, Tatar roots. After gaining celebrity as a guerrilla leader in the French invasion of Russia he became one of the most popular men in the country. Young men of Alexander Pushkin's circle viewed him as a model romantic hero and the Decembrists prized his company as well.

He was high-spirited, healthy, virile, unromantic, and shallow. He was a great wit and fond of fun, in life as well as in literature. His early and most popular verses are in a style of his own making, known as the "hussar style." In them he sings the praise of reckless valor, on the field of battle as well as before the bottle. The diction in some is rather unconventional, and occasionally his words have to be replaced by dots, but it is always full of spirit and great rhythmical go. His later poems are inspired by a late love for a very young girl. They are passionately sentimental, and vivid and alive. Pushkin had a high opinion of his poetry and said that Davydov had shown him the way to be original.

His poems were admired by Vissarion Belinsky for their organic quality and "Russianness".

Davydov fought in the Russo-Iranian War of 1826-1828.

His grave, with his statue above it, is situated next to the exit door of the Katholikon of the Novodevichy Convent.

== Guerrilla warfare ==
During the French invasion of the Russian Empire Lieutenant-Colonel Davydov suggested to his general, Pyotr Bagration, the strategy of using a small force of at least 3,000 horsemen to attack the supply trains of Napoleon's invading Grande Armée. The Russian Commander-in-chief Mikhail Kutuzov (in office from 29 August [O.S. 17 August] 1812) agreed and gave an order for 200 to increase his attrition warfare against Napoleon. Davydov started with 135 horsemen as a separate command in the rear of the Grande Armée. They wore peasant clothes and beards to get the immediate support of the Russian people. They gave captured food and French weapons to the peasants and taught them how to fight a people's war. They captured French forage-expeditions, supply-trains with food, horses, weapons and ammunition, freed Russian prisoners and integrated them as volunteers with French horses, uniforms and weapons into their raiding party. These actions set off an avalanche of guerrilla warfare that became an important part of Kutuzov's attrition warfare.

== In popular culture ==
Nikolay Yazykov wrote a poem, Д. В. Давыдову, to him in 1835.

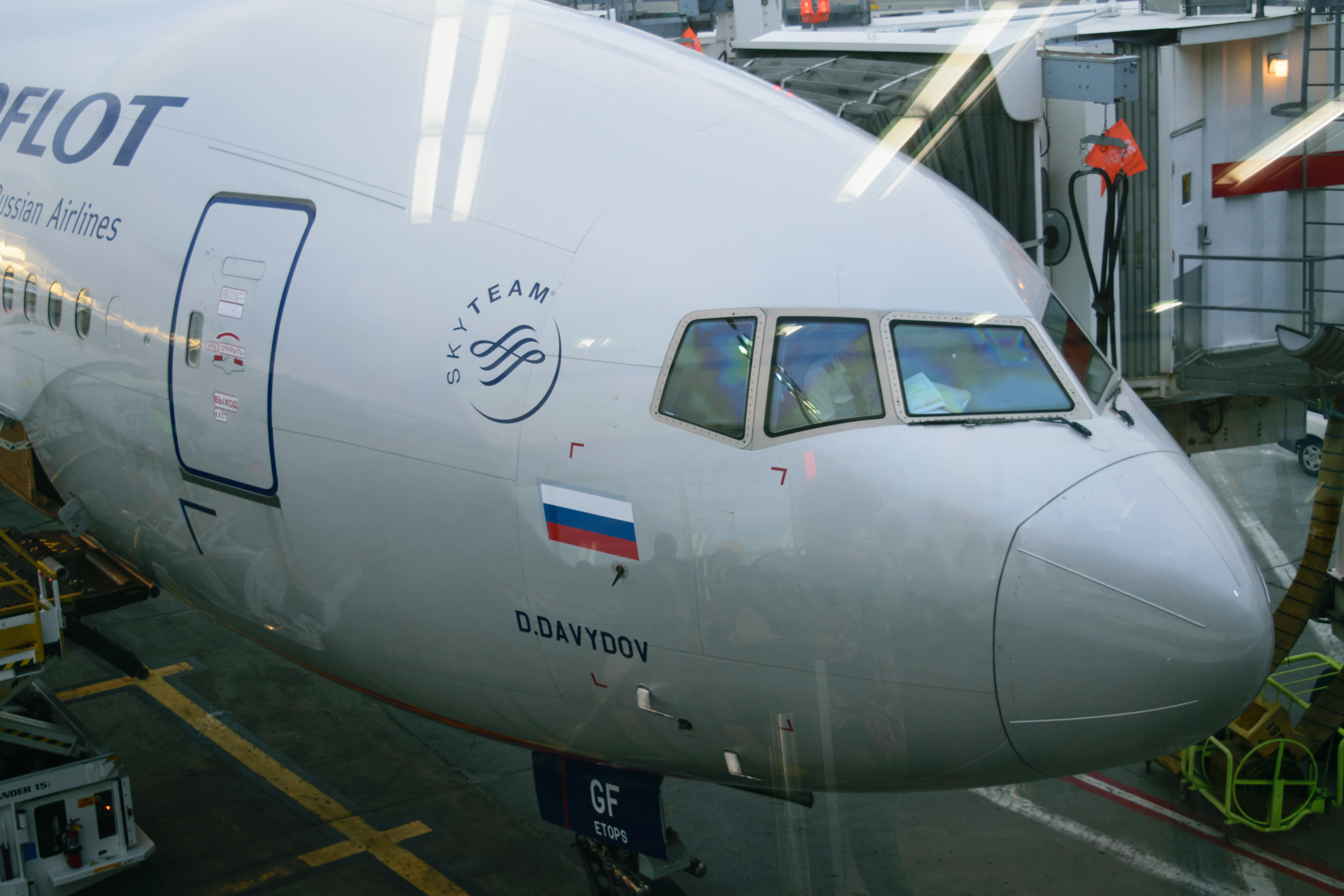
Aeroflot Boeing 777-300ER D. Davydov at John F. Kennedy Intl Airport in NYC bound for departure to Moscow's Sheremetyevo Intl Airport

A Boeing 777-300ER operated by Russia's national airline Aeroflot is named "D. Davydov" as part of a tradition in naming their fleet after historical Russian figures. The name is printed as part of the aircraft's nose art.

In the 20th and 21st century, at least 4 ships associated with the name of D. Davydov as an object of intangible heritage.
