= Sengileyevsky Uyezd =

Subdivision of the Simbirsk Governorate of the Russian Empire

Sengileyevsky Uyezd (Сенгилеевский уезд) was one of the subdivisions of the Simbirsk Governorate of the Russian Empire. It was situated in the southeastern part of the governorate. Its administrative centre was Sengiley.

== Demographics ==
At the time of the Russian Empire Census of 1897, Sengileyevsky Uyezd had a population of 151,726. Of these, 78.9% spoke Russian, 10.7% Mordvin, 4.6% Chuvash, 4.5% Tatar, 0.9% Belarusian, 0.2% Latvian and 0.2% Estonian as their native language.
