= Kurmysh =

Kurmysh Курмыш
- Selo
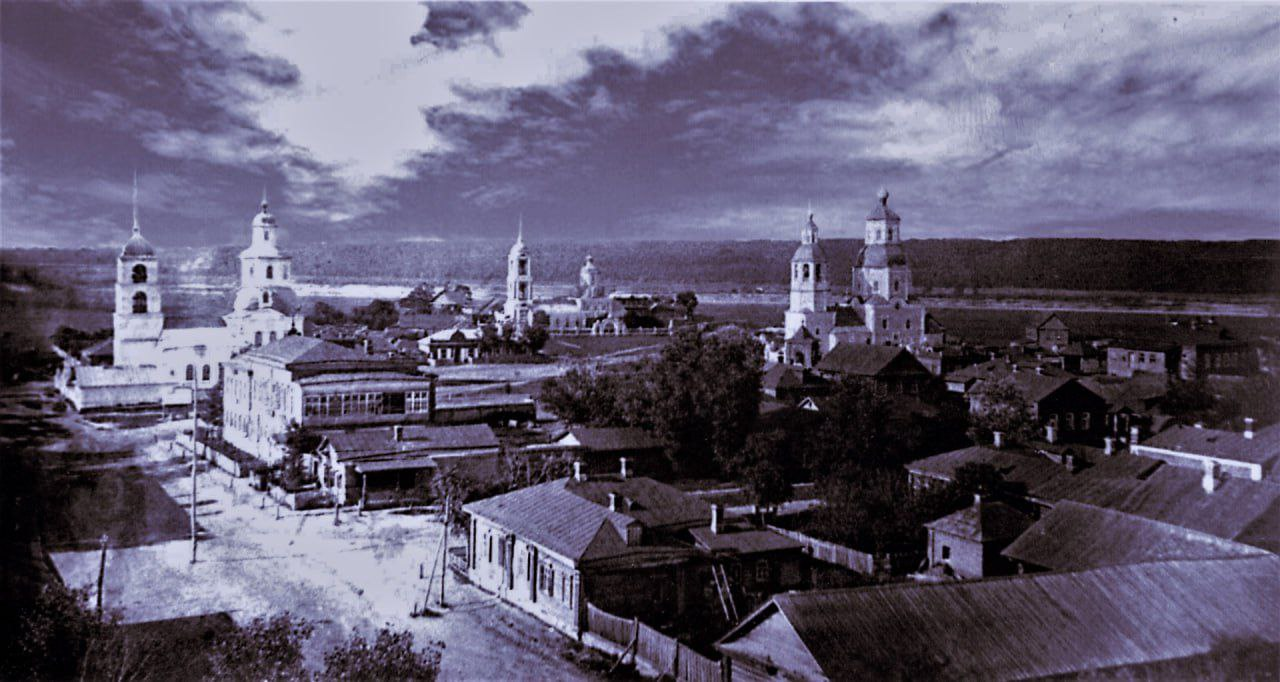

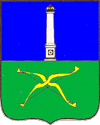
- Coat of arms
- Interactive map of Kurmysh
- Location of Kurmysh Kurmysh (Nizhny Novgorod Oblast)
- Coordinates: 55.830399°N 46.079239°E
- Country: Russia
- Federal subject: Nizhny Novgorod Oblast
- Administrative district: Pilninsky District
- Founded: 1372
- Elevation: 83 m (272 ft)

Population (2010 Census)
  - Total: 1,037
  - Estimate (1897): 3,166 (+205.3%)
- Time zone: UTC+3 (MSK)
- Postal code: 607467
- OKTMO ID: 22545000286

Kurmysh (Russian: Курмыш) is a rural locality (a selo) in Pilninsky District of Nizhny Novgorod Oblast, Russia. It is located over 100 kilometres (62 mi) east of Nizhny Novgorod. Population: 1,037 (2010 census); 1,291 (2002 census).

== History ==
Kurmysh was founded in 1372 when Prince Boris Konstantinovich of Nizhny Novgorod-Suzdal ordered its establishment on the Sura River ("постави город на Суре Курмыш нарече"). It was the easternmost Russian settlement for almost two centuries and it helped to consolidate Russian influence in the Volga region. As a result, it bore the brunt of attacks from the east.

In 1406–1407, Grand Prince Vasily I of Moscow, bequeathed "Kurmysh with everything that came with it" to his son. In 1445, Vasily II was released from Kurmysh after being captured by Ulugh Muhammad of the Kazan Khanate and forced to pay a ransom.

Following the capture of Kazan in 1552 by Ivan the Terrible, Kurmysh's position declined as the Russian fortress of Alatyr was established to the south. From the 1560s, it served as the administrative center of Kurmyshsky Uyezd within the Russian tsardom until 1708. In the second half of the 16th century and in the 17th century, it was mainly made up of service class people.

Kurmysh further lost its significance when the majority of the service class people were transferred to the border near Simbirsk. The lower categories of service class people, including Cossacks and streltsy, became state peasants in the early 18th century. By 1804, it had a population of 695. According to the 1897 census, about 3,200 people lived there.
