= Karsunsky Uyezd =

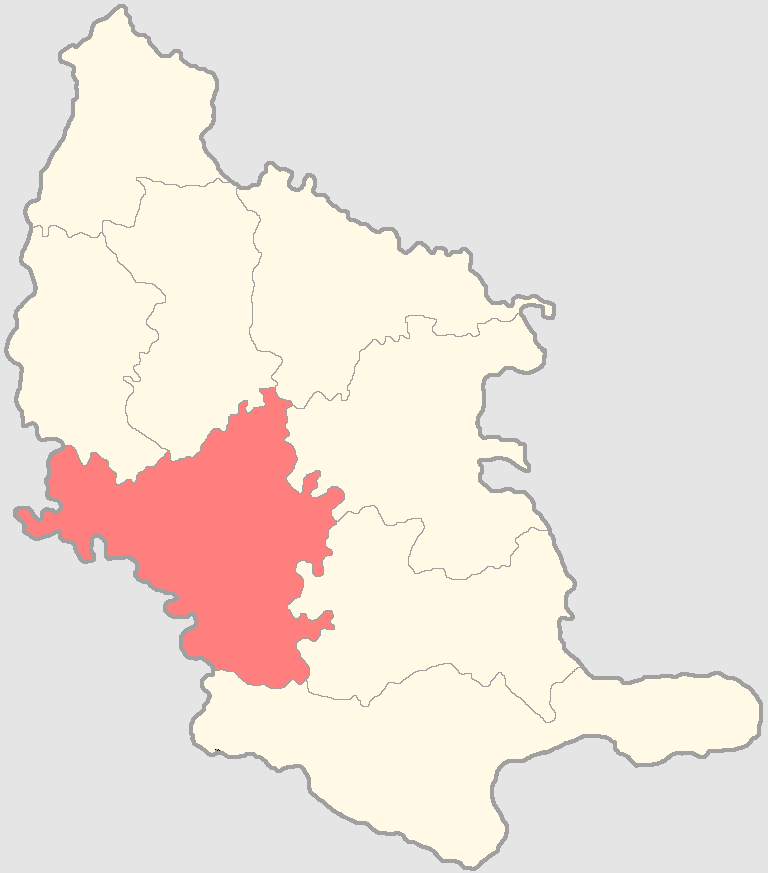

Karsunsky Uyezd (Карсунский уезд) was one of the subdivisions of the Simbirsk Governorate of the Russian Empire. It was situated in the western part of the governorate. Its administrative centre was Karsun.

== Demographics ==
At the time of the Russian Empire Census of 1897, Karsunsky Uyezd had a population of 217,087. Of these, 85.3% spoke Russian, 8.3% Mordvin, 3.9% Tatar, 2.3% Chuvash, 0.1% German and 0.1% Estonian as their native language.
