= Bikin (river) =

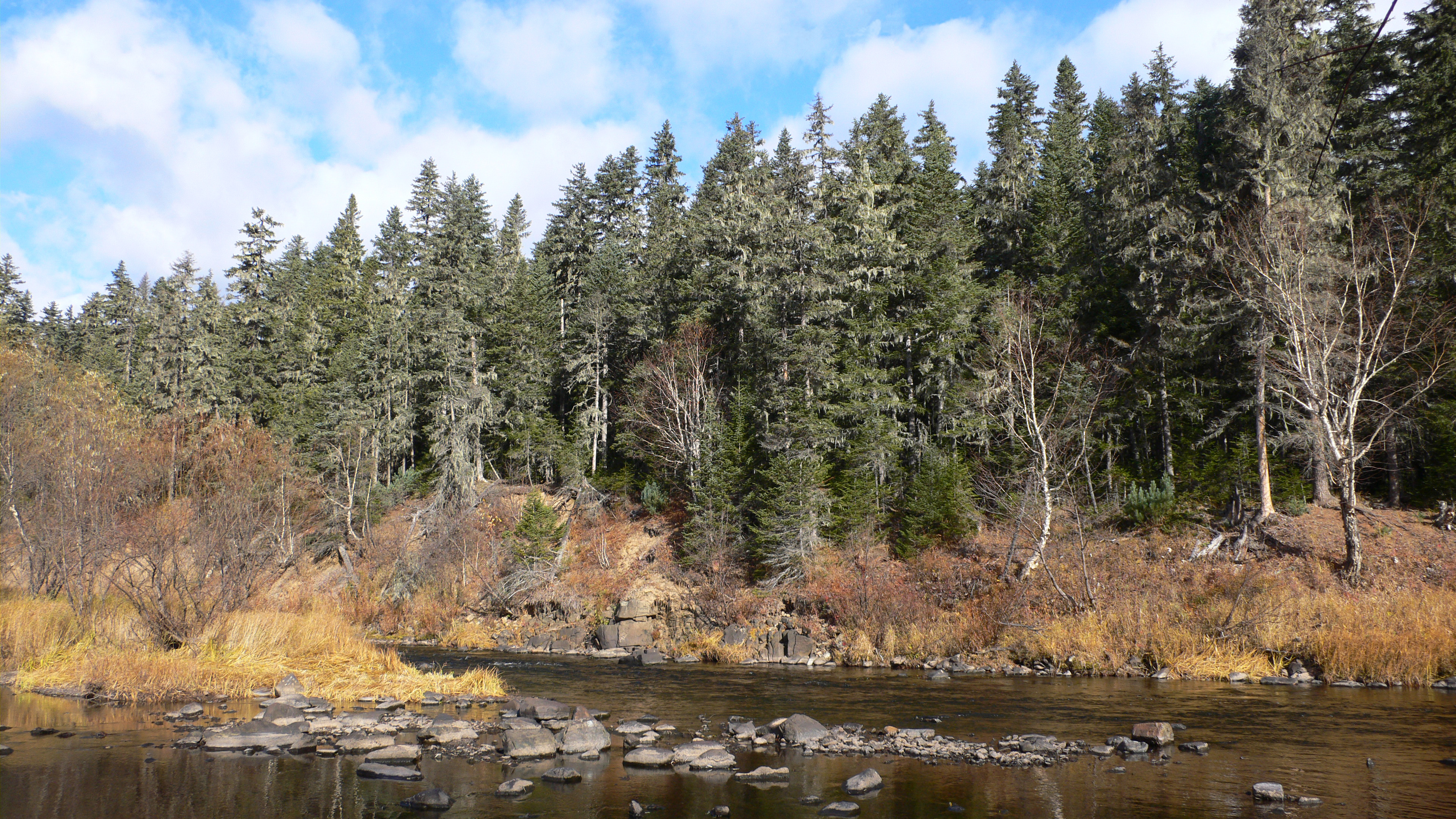

Location
- Country: Russia

Physical characteristics
- Mouth: Ussuri
  - coordinates: 46°51′07″N 134°02′12″E
- Length: 560 km (350 mi)
- Basin size: 22,300 km^{2} (8,600 sq mi)

Basin features
- Progression: Ussuri→ Amur→ Sea of Okhotsk

The Bikin (Russian: Бики́н) is a river in Primorsky and Khabarovsk Krais in Russia. It is a right tributary of the Ussuri, and is 560 kilometres (350 mi) long, with a drainage basin of 22,300 square kilometres (8,600 mi^{2}). Its main tributaries are the rivers Alchan, Klyuchevaya, Kontrovod and Zeva.

The town Bikin is situated on the river Bikin. In 2015, a significant portion of the Bikin basin was incorporated into the creation of Bikin National Park, one of the major protected areas of the Russian Federation. In 2018, Bikin River Valley was included in the boundaries of the Central Sikhote-Alin and became part of the World Heritage Site.

Basin of the Amur
