= Kurmyshsky Uyezd =

Kurmyshsky Uyezd (Курмышский уезд) was one of the subdivisions of the Simbirsk Governorate of the Russian Empire. It was situated in the northern part of the governorate. Its administrative centre was Kurmysh.

== Demographics ==
At the time of the Russian Empire Census of 1897, Kurmyshsky Uyezd had a population of 161,647. Of these, 52.5% spoke Russian, 25.9% Chuvash, 15.0% Tatar, 6.4% Mordvin and 0.1% Czech as their native language.
