= Temperate rainforests of the Russian Far East =

Rainforests in the Far East of Russia

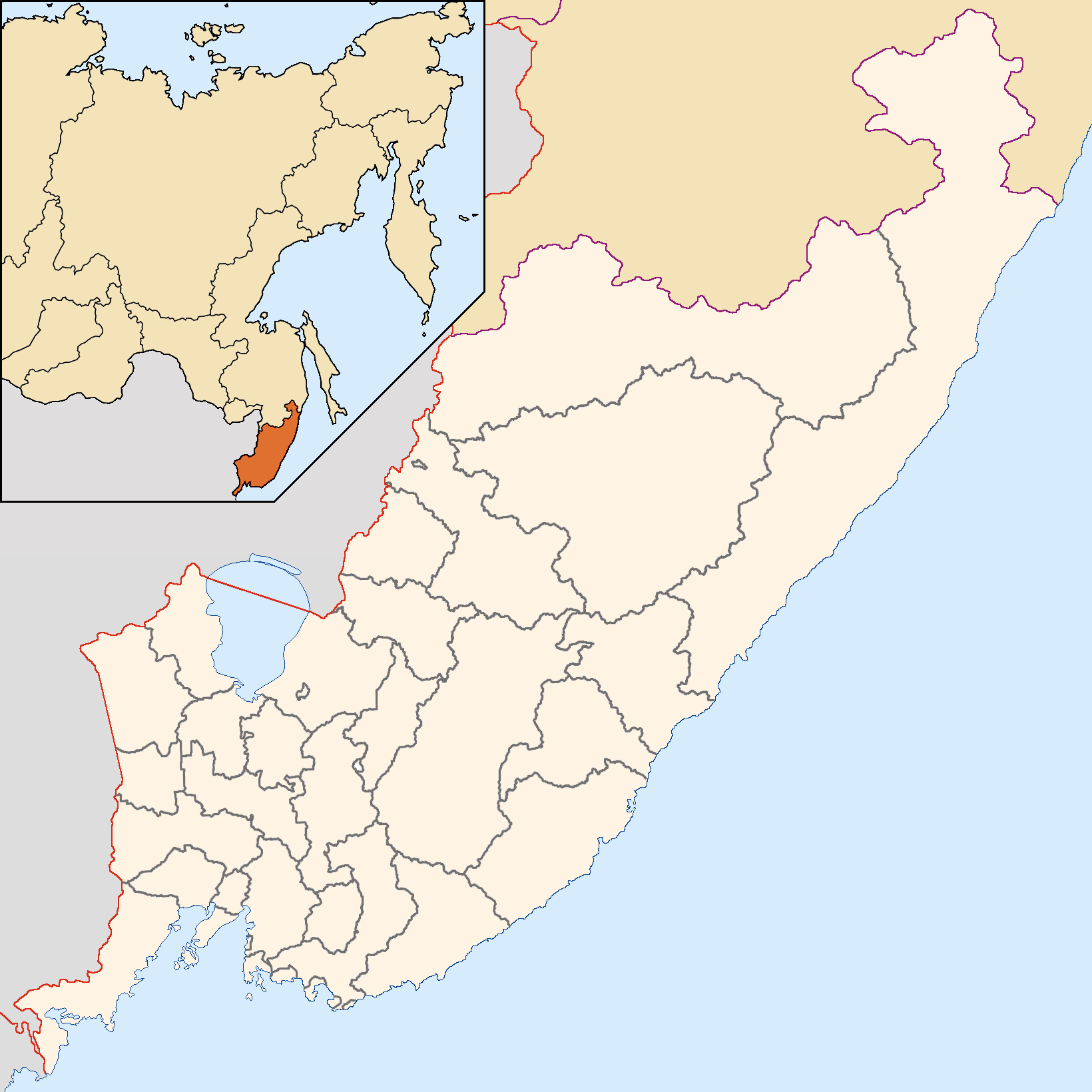
Primorsky Krai Map

The temperate rainforests of the Russian Far East are within the Russian federal subjects Primorsky Krai and Khabarovsk Krai and contains the Sikhote-Alin mountain range. Found within the Russian Federation, this area is one of the most productive and diverse forests in the world and also contains one of the highest endangered species densities on Earth. While most temperate rainforests around the world have retained only a fraction of their historical range, these forests maintain the majority of their former range and almost all of their historical biodiversity. The region is also notable for having what has become the last remaining large tract of viable habitat for the critically endangered Amur tiger and Amur leopard.

== History ==
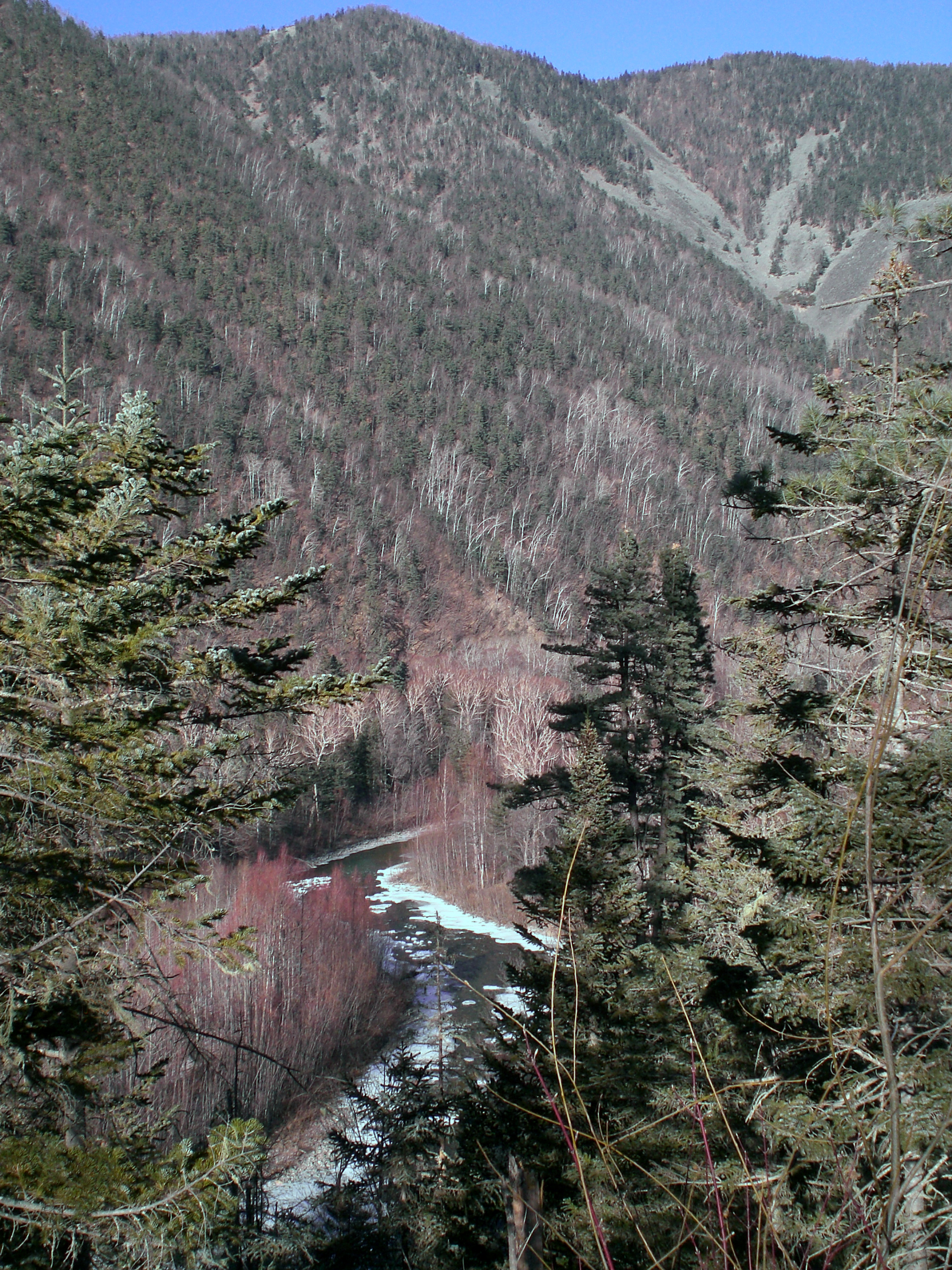
Maximovka valley

The Russian Federation contains one sixth of the world's land mass and around half of the country's territory is what could be considered continuous wilderness, with large expanses of boreal forests providing relatively untouched habitat for an extremely wide diversity of species. The temperate rainforests are located at the intersection of the Pacific tectonic plate and the Eurasian continent’s plate in far southeastern Russia, forming an area with a unique set of characteristics seen nowhere else in the world. During the last glacial maximum, the area was not glaciated, allowing for the development of a complex ecosystem containing species with origins in Siberia’s boreal forest and Manchuria’s subtropical forests. Historically these forests ranged from the southeastern Pacific coast of Russia, North Korea, and into northern China, however large amounts of human development (in China especially) has limited the forest to its current range in the Russian Far East. In 2001, UNESCO recognized a 1.5 million hectare area of forest in the central part of the Sikhote-Alin mountains as a World Heritage Site in Russia, citing the area as one of the most unique and valuable areas of intact forest in the world

== Geography ==
These forests are found dispersed throughout the Sikhote-Alin mountain range, which extend over 1000 km along the west coast of the Sea of Japan. The mountains have a maximum height of 1850 m, while the average elevation within the range is around 1000 m. The major rivers include the Ussuri, which acts as the western border with China and empties into the Amur river, which in turn flows northeast to empties into the Sea of Okhotsk. The Bikin and Iman rivers act as tributaries to the Ussuri, flowing west from the Sikhote-Alin mountain range.

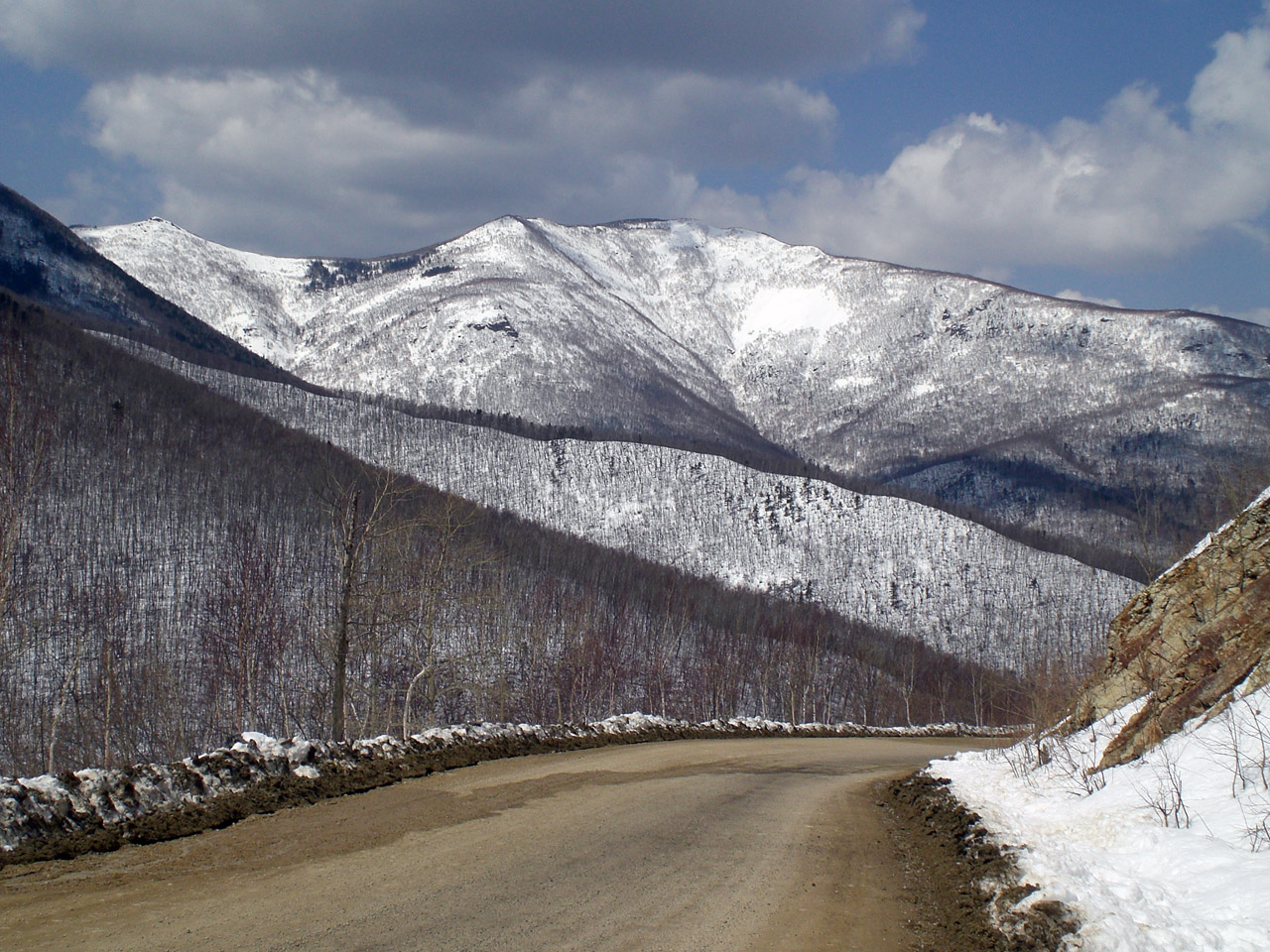
Sikhote-Alin mountain range in winter

== Climate ==
Known as the "Ussuri taiga," this region of Russia has long, cold winters and fairly mild summers to go along with a mean precipitation of 800–1000 mm per year. During the summer and fall, a monsoonal influence brings tropical storms and typhoons coming from the southeast, resulting in substantial rainfall. Fog occurs as a result of difference in temperatures between the continent and the ocean, resulting in more moderate temperatures, higher humidities; helping to prevent substantial water loss from occurring due to evapotranspiration. Continental winds coming in from Siberia bring cooler, dry air during winter, resulting in lighter precipitation (30–50 cm of snow). Winters can be long and bitterly cold with January mean temperatures ranging from -15 to -20 °C and snow covering the forest floor from October to April. The driest parts of the year are from April to June and September to October, which also happen to coincide with the greatest threat of forest fire.

== Species ==
The forests fall in the transition zone between two biomes: the southern Asian hardwood forest and the northern coniferous forest. There have been around 2500 species of vascular plants and 300 vertebrate species recorded in Primorsky Krai.

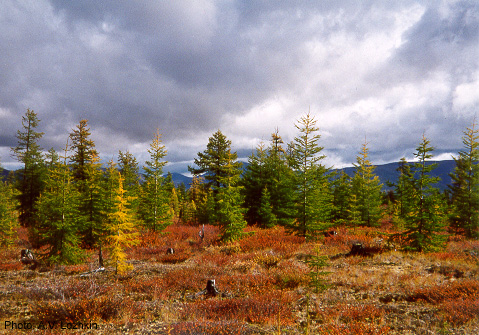
A Gmelin larch (Larix gmelini) stand in the Russian Far East

The forest is a mix of broadleaf and conifer, with the forest type becoming more conifer dominated at higher elevations and more broad-leaf-conifer mixed at the lower elevations and within valleys. The most common species include the Korean pine (Pinus koraiensis) and Manchurian fir (Abies holophylla) at the lowest elevations and coastlines. Jezo spruce (Picea jezoensis) and Khingan fir (Abies nephrolepis) are common species to be found from 700 to 1400 meters. Other tree species include Mongolian oak (Quercus mongolica), silver birch (Betula platyphylla), Scots pine (Pinus sylvestris), trembling aspen (Populus tremula), Siberian dwarf pine (Pinus pumila), Erman's birch (Betula ermanii), and Dahurian larch (Larix gmelinii), a deciduous conifer common throughout, but dominant in the northernmost reaches of the forest The Amur region of Russia holds the last remaining habitats for the critically endangered Siberian tiger, Amur leopard, and Manchurian sika deer. It has been estimated that there are less the 600 tigers. and around 90 leopards left in the wild. The area also contains populations of Asiatic black bears, Kamchatka brown bears, and Mongolian grey wolves, as the Russian Far East, altogether, might probably be the only place in the world where endangered tigers, leopards, bears, and grey wolves coexist. This region also happens to be some of the last of habitat of the Blakiston's fish owl (Bubo blakistoni); along with being the world's largest owl, it is unique in the way that it eats fish (primarily Masu salmon) and relies on old growth forests along river banks to hunt, nest, and breed. The Siberian grouse is similar to the spruce grouse and Franklin's grouse of North America, and can be found in the dense, remote pockets of broadleaf, coniferous and deciduous forests of Far East Russia. Common ungulates include red deer, roe deer, wild boar, Manchurian moose, and musk deer.

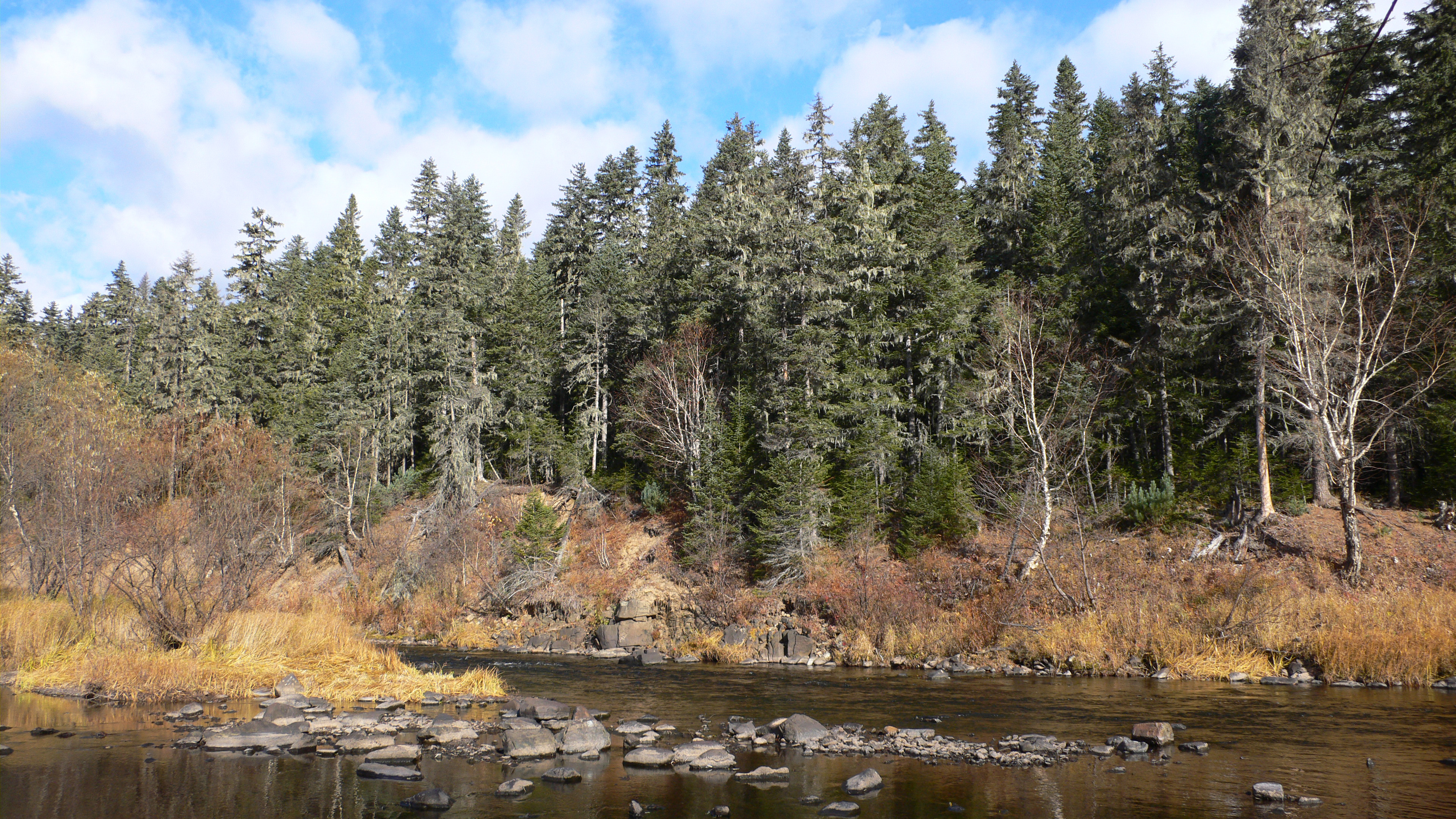
Korean pine and Jezo spruce mixed forest along the Bikin River.

== Forest structure and disturbances ==
Fire and logging constitute the primary disturbances in this area, both of which are occurring at an increasing frequency. Illegal logging practices, along with a political climate more favorable to multinational logging corporations has drastically increased the amount of timber taken per year. The occurrence of Korean pine in dominant forests has been declining as more common and more intense wildfires start to take their toll on the species, limiting its ability to recover and changing areas that were once dominated by old growth Korean pine to Mongolian oak and birch forests. Above 700–800 meters in altitude, the forest type transitions from broadleaf to coniferous, dominated by Jezo spruce and Manchurian fir. The further to the north, the altitudinal gradient decreases with the increase in latitude, resulting in coniferous forests at sea level at 47° N latitude.

== Conservation ==
Under the USSR control, conservation strategies focused on the creation and a network of strictly protected nature reserves, called zapovednik and partially protected wildlife refuges, called zakaznik. These conservation strategies were largely successful and well maintained, as 85 zapovedniks and 26 national parks remained within Russian control after the fall of the Soviet Union in December 1991. Following the break up, a period of economic hardship has ensued in Russia, resulting in conservation funding cuts and increases in illegal logging and poaching, casting serious doubt on the viabilities of the protected areas and the many rare and endemic species that they contain.

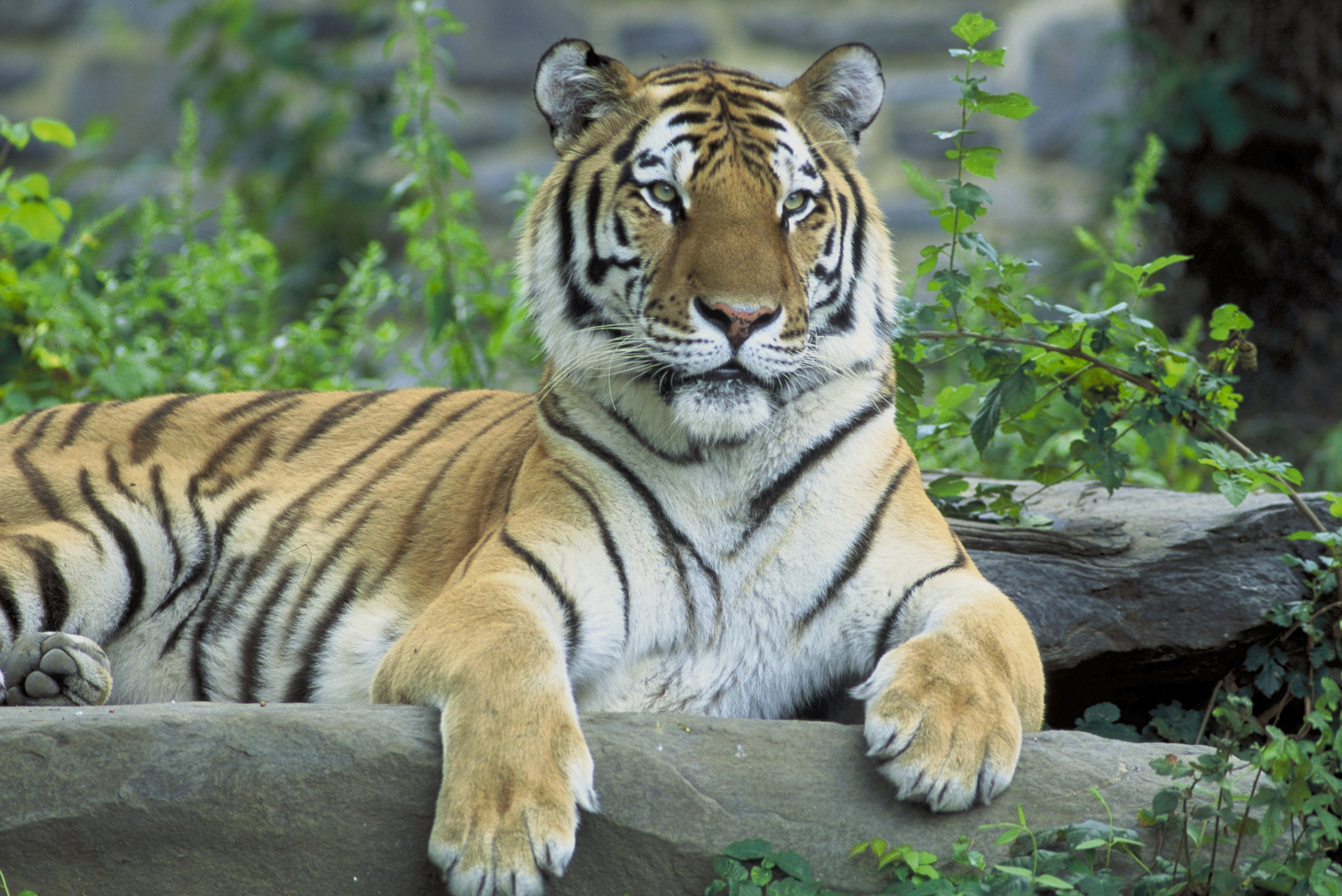
Amur (Siberian) tiger

Conservation policies have been falling from federal control down to a regional level, which creates funding and enforcement challenges, but also allows for a more grass-roots, bottom up approach to conservation, which despite the challenges has seen some success. Much of the recent funding for conservation studies and implementation of legislation comes from donors and organizations in the United States, where investing in conserving the biodiversity in the Russian Far East is seen as a good economic investment. At a species level, Korean pine is a highly valued type of timber, and although the logging of the species is restricted, illegal logging practices thrive due to a lack of enforcement. Korean pine forests also receive the most interest when it comes to conservationists, as they have been found to have the highest densities of tigers and their prey. Because of this, it appears that the longevity of the temperate rain forests in the Russian Far East will most likely depend on the success of the habitat conservation efforts for the endangered species found there, particularly those for the Amur tiger.
