= Pozharsky (inhabited locality) =

Pozharsky (Russian: Пожа́рский; masculine), Pozharskaya (Пожа́рская; feminine), or Pozharskoye (Пожа́рское; neuter) is the name of several rural localities in Russia:

- Pozharsky (rural locality), a railway crossing in Khasansky District of Primorsky Krai
- Pozharskoye, Kirov Oblast, a village in Verkhovinsky Rural Okrug of Yuryansky District of Kirov Oblast
- Pozharskoye, Primorsky Krai, a selo in Pozharsky District of Primorsky Krai
- Pozharskoye, Yaroslavl Oblast, a selo in Glebovsky Rural Okrug of Pereslavsky District of Yaroslavl Oblast
