= Moscow Paleontological Museum =

Paleontology museum in Moscow, Russia

Orlov Museum of Paleontology
- Палеонтологический музей им. Ю. А. Орлова
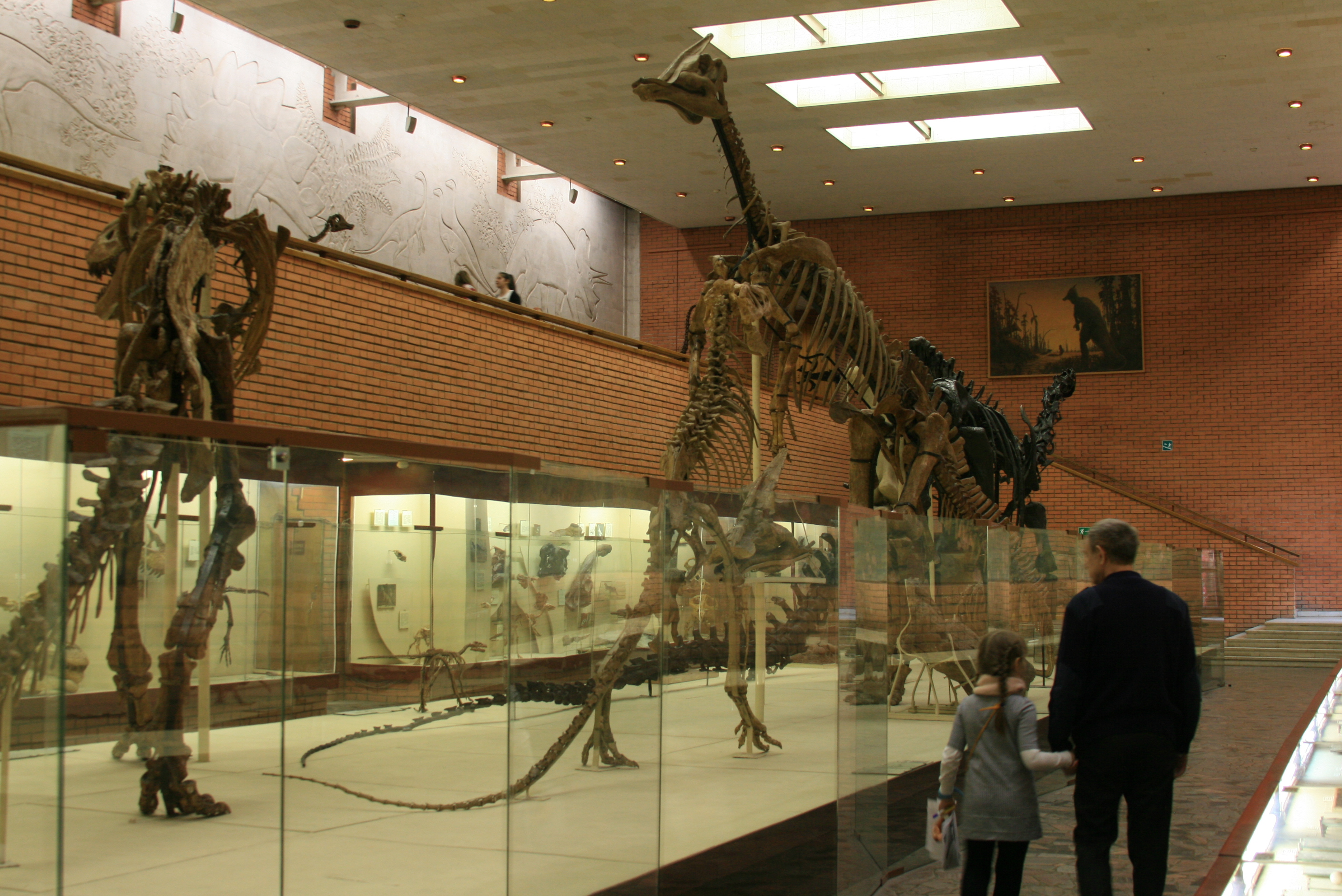

- Location within Moscow
- Established: 1937
- Location: 123 Profsoyuznaya street, Moscow, Russia (since 1987)
- Coordinates: 55.6239°N 37.5139°E
- Type: Paleontology

The Orlov Museum of Paleontology (Russian: Палеонтологический музей им. Ю. А. Орлова) or Moscow Paleontological Museum is a museum in Moscow, Russia. It was founded by Paleontological Institute of Russian Academy of Sciencies in 1937 prior to the XVII session of the International Geological Congress. It is named after Yuri Alexandrovich Orlov (1893–1966).

It contains public exhibits representing almost every type of fossil organism. Particularly well represented are dinosaurs from Mongolia, therapsids from the Perm region of Russia, and Precambrian fossils from Siberia.

== History ==
The museum started out as a branch of the Zoological Museum of Moscow University. When founded in 1937, the museum occupied 700 sq. m. in a building on Bolshaya Kaluzhskaya Street. During the German-Soviet War the museum was closed and the major part of collection relocated to Alma-Ata.

In 1944 museum was reopened for the general public, but in 1954 it was closed again due to the shortage of display space. In 1965 the USSR Council of Ministers granted 2 million rubles for the construction of the new museum building. However, construction works started only in 1972. The renewed museum met the first visitors in 1987.

== Architecture ==
The museum consists of six exhibition halls, which are introductory hall, Precambrian and early Paleozoic, temporary exhibitions, late Paleozoic and Early Mesozoic, Mesozoic and Cenozoic.
