= Alatyrsky Uyezd =

Alatyrsky Uyezd (Алатырский уезд) was one of the subdivisions of the Simbirsk Governorate of the Russian Empire. It was situated in the northern part of the governorate. Its administrative centre was Alatyr.

== Demographics ==
At the time of the Russian Empire Census of 1897, Alatyrsky Uyezd had a population of 158,188. Of these, 73.0% spoke Russian, 26.6% Mordvin, 0.1% Tatar and 0.1% Ukrainian as their native language.
