= Erzya Mordovian Museum of Visual Arts =

Art museum in Saransk, Mordovia, Russia

Coordinates: 54.185304°N 45.179364°E

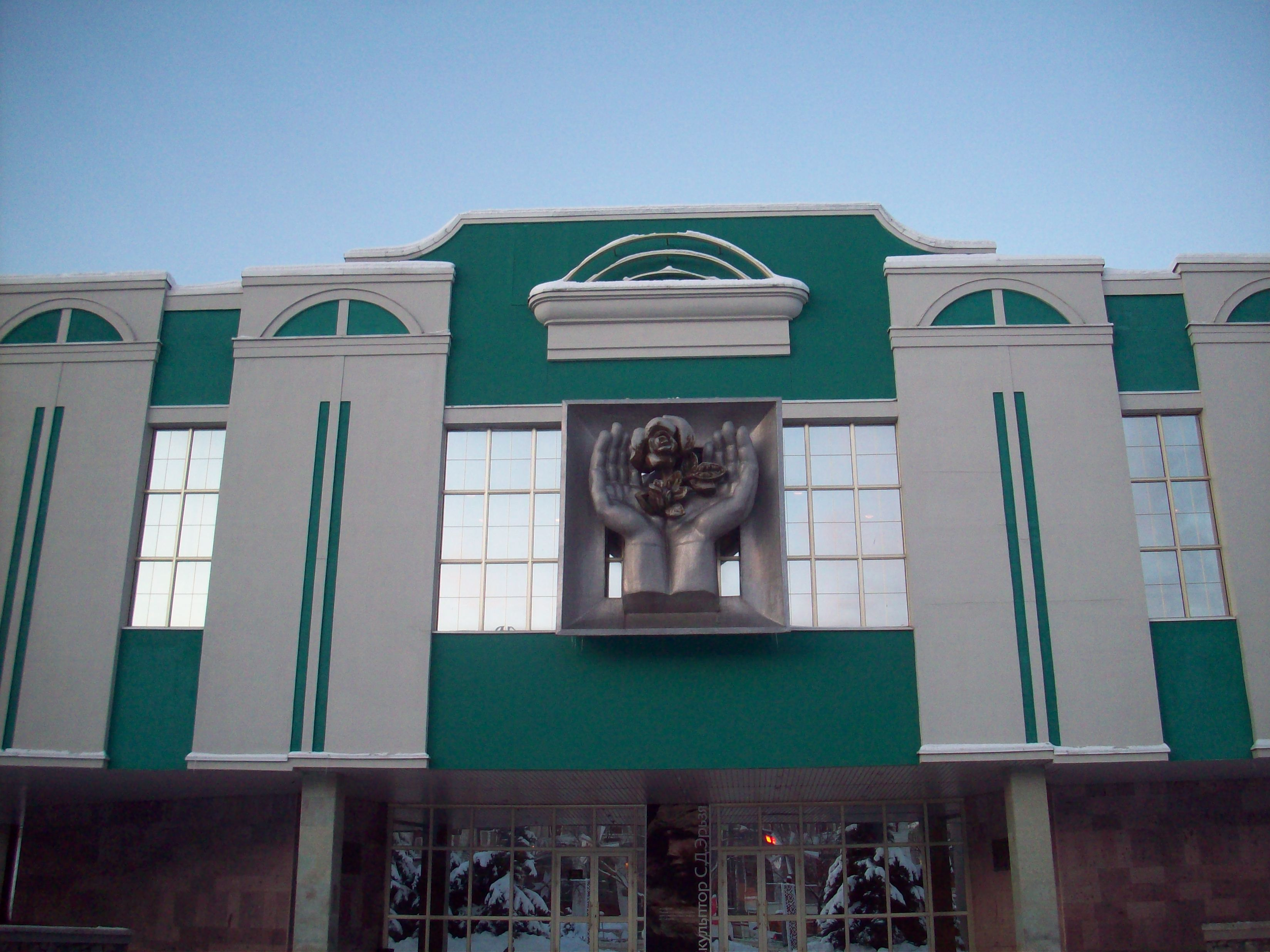
- Established: March 14, 1941
- Location: Saransk city in Mordovian Republic.
- Collections: Mordovian folk artists, such as F. Sychkov, and I. Makarov
- Collection size: more than 200 works done by Stepan Erzya
- Executive director: Lyudmila Narbekova

The Mordovian Republican Museum of Visual Arts Named after S.D. Erzya (Russian: Мордовский республиканский музей изобразительных искусств им. С.Д. Эрьзи) is a museum in the city of Saransk in the Mordovian Republic.

The Erzya Mordovian Museum of Visual Arts holds the world's largest collection of more than 200 works done by the famous Erzyan sculptor Stepan Dmitrievich Erzya. The museum also contains collection of works of Mordovian folk artists, such as Fedot Sychkov, and Ivan Makarov. Both of them, as well as Erzya were born in Mordovia. The museum exhibits collections of all the major art forms: painting, drawing, sculpture. There are also expositions and collections of Russian art of the 18th and 19th centuries and of the modern Russian and Mordovian art as well. In 2002, the museum was classified by the Government of Mordovia as one of the most valuable objects of cultural heritage of Mordovian people.

== History of the museum ==
In 1941, soon after establishing of the Union of Mordovian artists it was decided to found a gallery in order to stimulate young artists and to promote art among working class. On March 14, 1941, in accordance with the resolution of the Counscil of National Mordovian Comissars, the gallery of arts was opened in Saransk. The World War II prevented the establishment of the museum in Saransk. The issue was raised again in 1950's. There were many new artists, some of them were the soldiers who had come back from the war, joined the Union. On January 10, 1960, they established the Mordovian Republican gallery named after a famous Mordovian artist Fedor Sychkov. Also, the museum received a big collection of works of Mordovian famous sculptor Stepan Erzya.

At first the museum was in a single-storey building on Sovetskaya Street, but when the permanent exhibition of Erzya sculptures was moved in, the museum was given with another building. The modern building of the museum was given after Erzya's 100th anniversary.

In 1978 the Gallery was reorganised into Erzya Mordovian Museum of Visual Arts.

In 2004 the painter and designer Lyudmila Narbekova became the head of the museum.

== Buildings ==
=== The main museum building ===
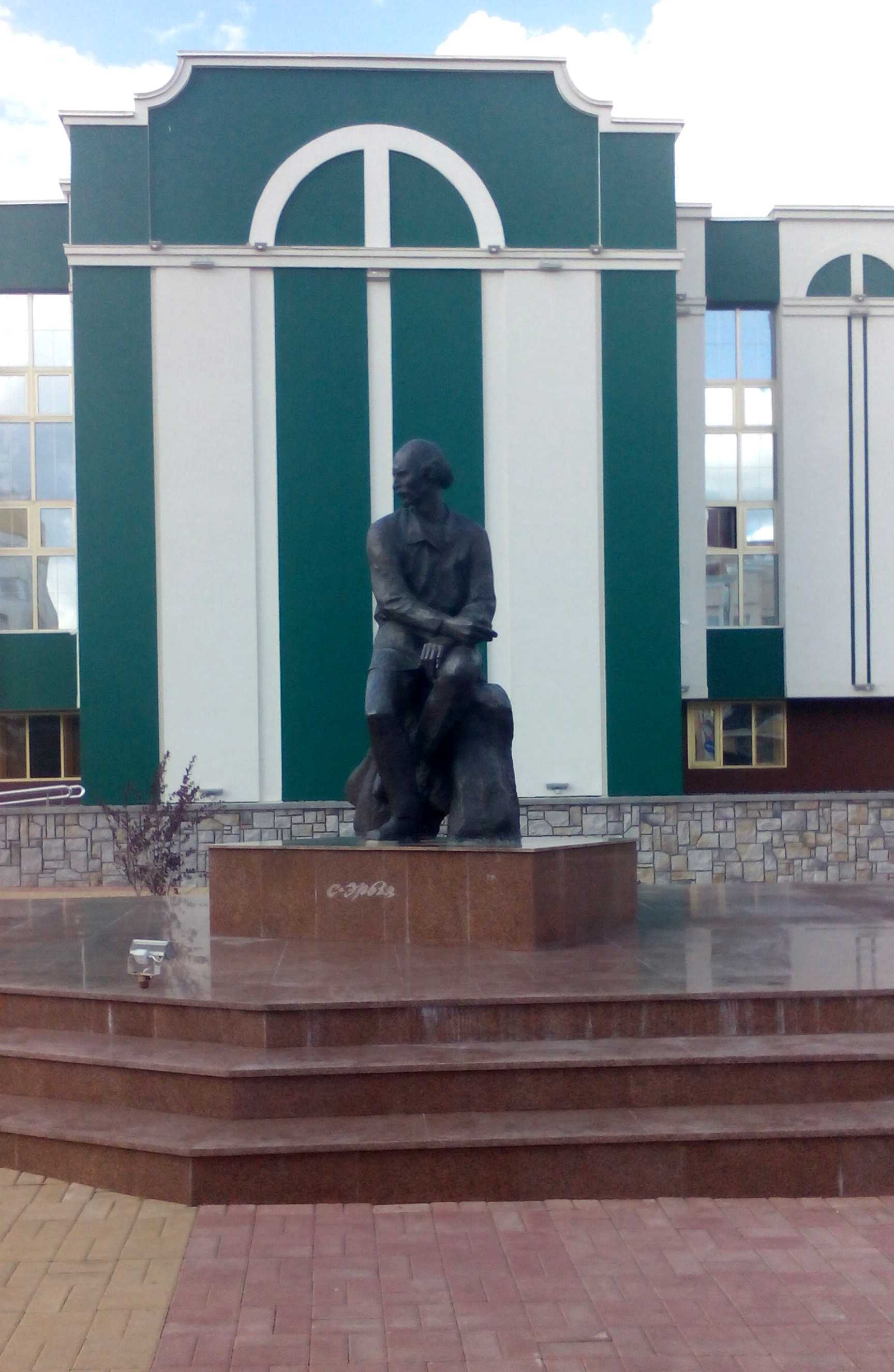
Monument to Stepan Erzya (2015)

The main museum infrastructure consists of two buildings standing side by side. The west wing was built in 1976 (architect V. Sologub), by the 100th anniversary of Erzya. In 1985 the second building was constructed next to the first one. They are connected by the gallery on the 2nd floor. In 2001, on the 125th anniversary of Erzya, the museum was reconstructed and its appearance was greatly improved.

=== The exhibition hall ===
The exhibition hall of the museum (Sovetskaya street, 29, Saransk, Russia), was built in the mid-1950s by the architect S. Levkov. It's located next to the Mordovian Drama Theatre.

== Affiliates of the museum ==
- Museum of Mordovian Folk Culture
- Stepan Erzya House Museum in Bayevo, Ardatovsky District
- Fedot Sychkov House Museum in Kochelayevo, Kovylkinsky District
