= Luchegorsk =

Luchegorsk Лучегорск
- Urban-type settlement
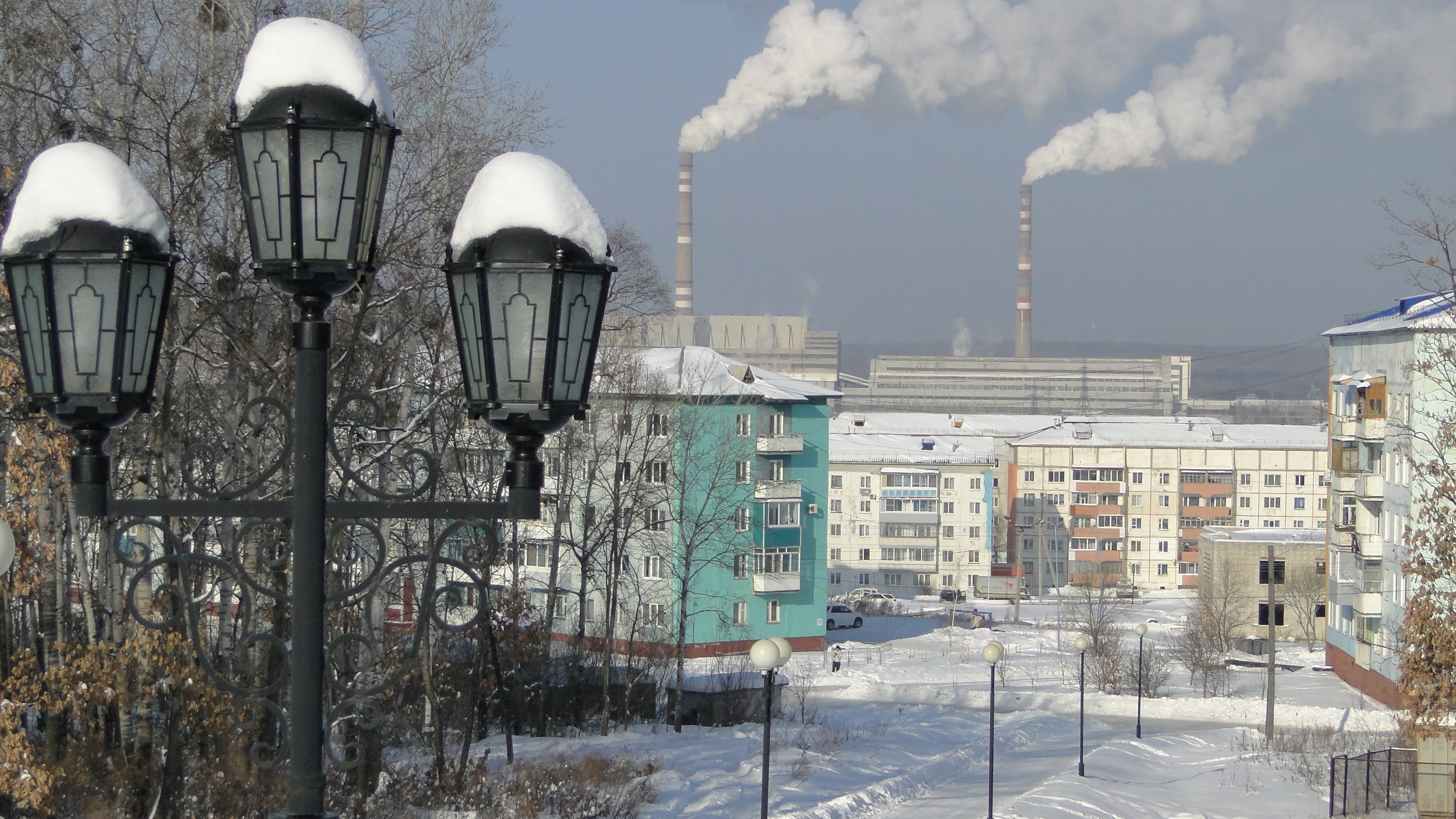
- Electric power station in Luchegorsk
- Interactive map of Luchegorsk
- Location of Luchegorsk Luchegorsk (Primorsky Krai)
- Coordinates: 46°27′N 134°17′E
- Country: Russia
- Federal subject: Primorsky Krai
- Founded: 1966

Population (2010 Census)
  - Total: 21,004
  - Estimate (2023): 17,089 (−18.6%)

Administrative status
  - Capital of: Pozharsky District
- Time zone: UTC+10 (MSK+7)
- Postal code: 692001
- OKTMO ID: 05634151051

Luchegorsk (Russian: Лучего́рск) is an urban locality (an urban-type settlement) and the administrative center of Pozharsky District of Primorsky Krai, Russia. Population: 21,004 (2010 census); 22,365 (2002 census); 21,825 (1989 Soviet census).

== History ==
It was founded in 1966 on the bank of the Kontrovod River.

== Economy ==
There is a large electric power station which supplies the electricity to Primorsky Krai and causes ecological problems in Luchegorsk. It is the closest settlement to where the Sino-Soviet border conflict occurred.

== Miscellaneous ==
Luchegorsk is the largest inhabited locality in the Far Eastern Federal District which does not have town status. In September 2015, The Guardian reported that 'dozens of hungry bears' had besieged the town, wandering the streets and attacking residents.
