= Kontrovod =

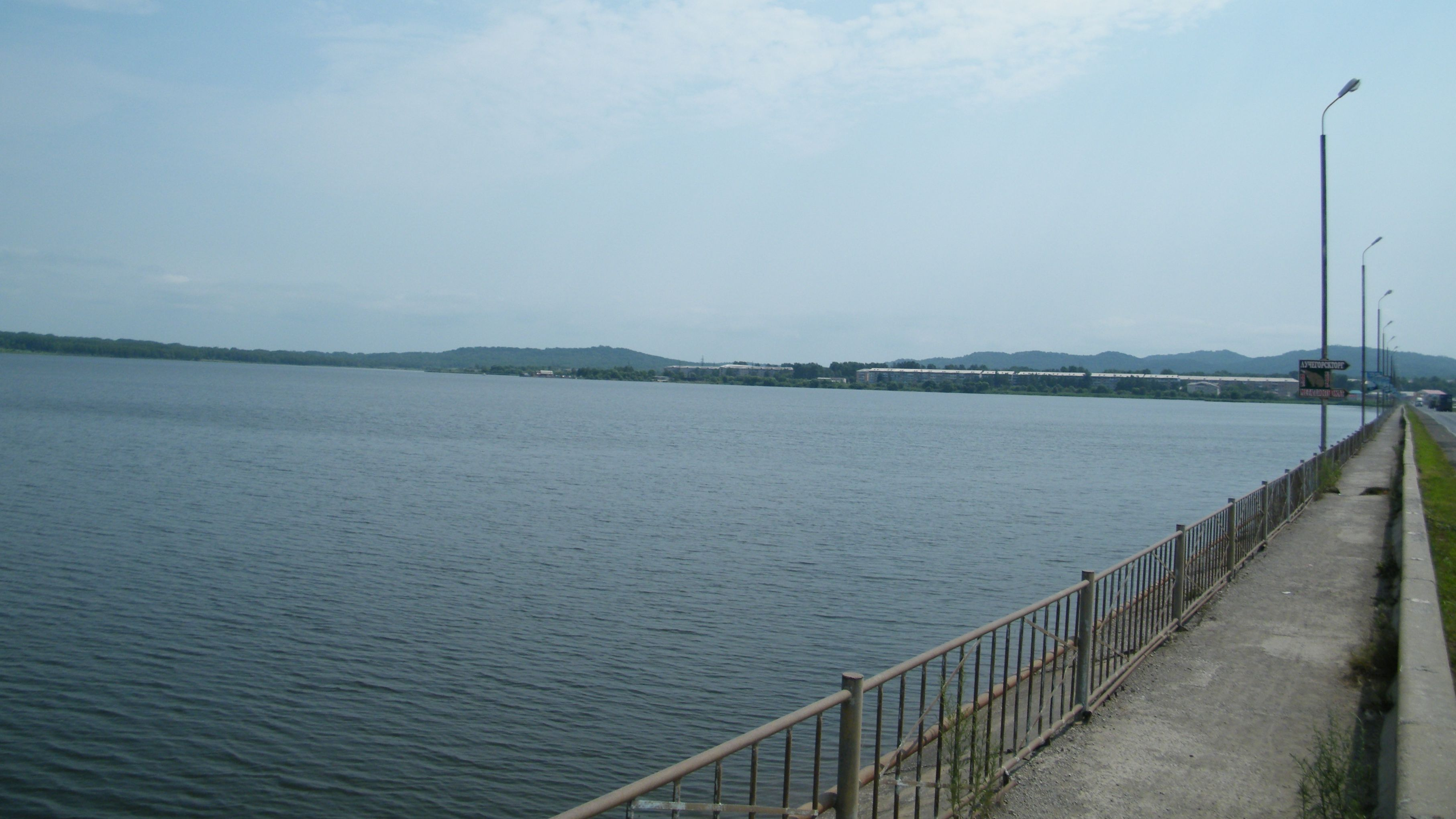

Location
- Country: Russia

Physical characteristics
- Source
  - location: Strelnikov Range, Sikhote-Alin
- Mouth: Bikin
  - coordinates: 46°31′47″N 134°23′17″E
- Length: 49 km (30 mi)

Basin features
- Progression: Bikin→ Ussuri→ Amur→ Sea of Okhotsk

The Kontrovod (Russian: Контровод) is a river in Primorsky Krai, Russia. It is 49 kilometres (30 mi) long. It rises in the Strelnikov Range of Sikhote-Alin. The Kontrovod is a left tributary of the Bikin.

Luchegorsk was founded on the banks of the river. There is an electric power station's reservoir on the river in Luchegorsk.
