= Buinsky Uyezd =

Buinsky Uyezd (Буинский уезд) was one of the subdivisions of the Simbirsk Governorate of the Russian Empire. It was situated in the northern part of the governorate. Its administrative centre was Buinsk.

== Demographics ==
At the time of the Russian Empire Census of 1897, Buinsky Uyezd had a population of 182,056. Of these, 44.3% spoke Chuvash, 34.6% Tatar, 17.3% Russian and 3.8% Mordvin as their native language.
