= Syzransky Uyezd =

Uyezd of Simbirsk Governorate, Russian Empire

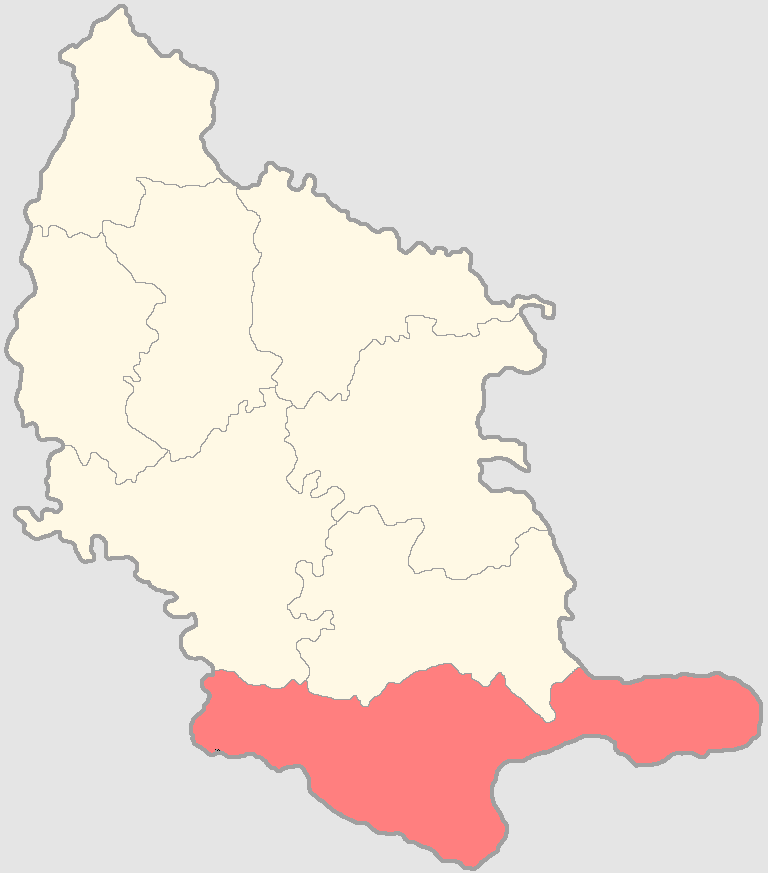
Area indicated in red

Syzransky Uyezd (Сызранский уезд) was one of the subdivisions of the Simbirsk Governorate of the Russian Empire. It was situated in the southern part of the governorate. Its administrative centre was Syzran.

== Demographics ==
At the time of the Russian Empire Census of 1897, Syzransky Uyezd had a population of 242,045. Of these, 88.7% spoke Russian, 4.1% Mordvin, 3.4% Chuvash, 3.1% Tatar, 0.4% Ukrainian, 0.1% Latvian, 0.1% Polish and 0.1% German as their native language.

== Notable people ==
- Yuri Aleksandrovich Orlov] (1893–1966), zoologist and paleontologist, born in Syzransky Uyezd.
