= Ardatovsky Uyezd (Simbirsk Governorate) =

Ardatovsky Uyezd (Ардатовский уезд) was one of the subdivisions of the Simbirsk Governorate of the Russian Empire. It was situated in the northwestern part of the governorate. Its administrative centre was Ardatov.

== Demographics ==
At the time of the Russian Empire Census of 1897, Ardatovsky Uyezd had a population of 189,226. Of these, 59.6% spoke Russian, 39.4% Mordvin and 0.9% Tatar as their native language.
