= Simbirsky Uyezd =

Uyezd of Simbirsk Governorate, Russian Empire

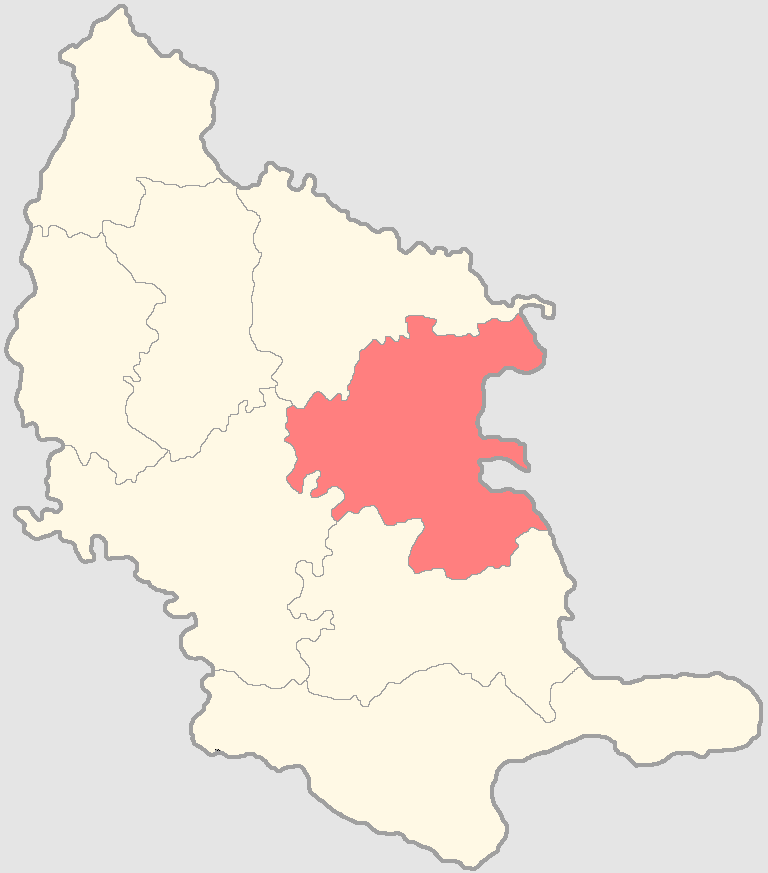
Simbirsk district on the map of Simbirsk province

Simbirsky Uyezd (Симбирский уезд) was one of the subdivisions of the Simbirsk Governorate of the Russian Empire. It was situated in the eastern part of the governorate. Its administrative centre was Simbirsk (Ulyanovsk).

== Demographics ==
At the time of the Russian Empire Census of 1897, Simbirsky Uyezd had a population of 225,873. Of these, 77.1% spoke Russian, 9.8% Tatar, 7.4% Chuvash, 4.9% Mordvin, 0.2% Estonian, 0.2% Polish, 0.1% Ukrainian, 0.1% Yiddish and 0.1% German as their native language.
