= Klyuchevaya =

Klyuchevaya Ключевая
- Village
- Location within Irkutsk Oblast Location within Russia
- Coordinates: 52°22′N 103°55′E
- Country: Russia
- Region: Irkutsk Oblast
- District: Angarsky District
- Time zone: UTC+8:00

Klyuchevaya (Russian: Ключевая) is a rural locality (a settlement) in Angarsky District, Irkutsk Oblast, Russia. Population: 23 (2010 census);

== Geography ==
This rural locality is located 19 kilometres (12 mi) from Angarsk (the district's administrative centre), 26 kilometres (16 mi) from Irkutsk (capital of Irkutsk Oblast) and 4,517 kilometres (2,807 mi) from Moscow. Zverevo is the nearest rural locality.
