= Alexei Zavarzin =

Soviet histologist and biologist

Alexei Alexeivich Zavarzin
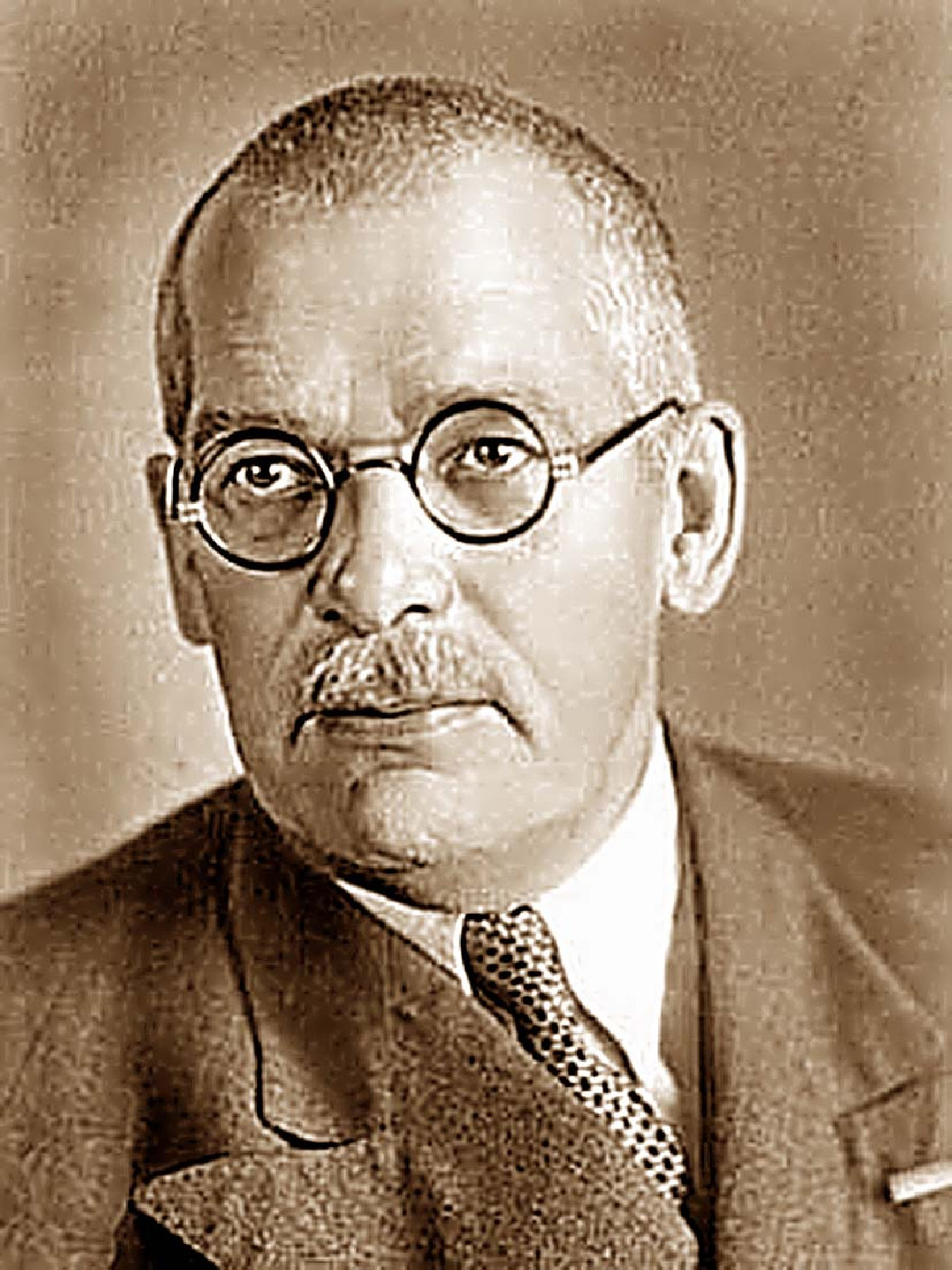
- Born: March 25, 1886; Saint Petersburg, Russian Empire
- Died: July 25, 1945 (aged 59); Saint Petersburg, Soviet Union

Alexei Alexeivich Zavarzin (Zawarzin in German publications, Russian: Алексей Алексеевич Заварзин) (25 March 1886 – 25 July 1945) was a Soviet histologist and biologist. He worked on evolutionary and comparative aspects of histology. He proposed that comparable tissues developed in similar ways across organisms.

Zavarzin was born in St. Petersburg where his father Alexei Amplievich and mother Anna Savelyevna (Stepanova) ran a mechanic workshop. He was educated at the Karl May School and graduated in 1902. He took an interest in natural sciences after studying under K. M. Deryugin. He then joined the University, first applying as a volunteer. He had to study Latin and separately pass an exam before he was admitted to St. Petersburg University. He studied under V.T. Shevyakov (1859-1930) and then under A.S. Dogel (1852–1922). In 1905 he was beaten up by Black Hundreds during a protest and he received a skull injury. After recovering he went to the University of Heidelberg for a year and returned to graduate the next year. He then taught at the Women's medical institute. He defended his master's thesis in 1913. He became a professor in Perm in histology in 1916 and returned to St. Petersburg in 1922. He headed the department of histology at the Military Medical Academy and in 1932 he moved to the All-Union Institute of Experimental Medicine where he worked until his death while also serving in other positions. He developed the institution with new microscopes and histological specimen preparation equipment and began studies on nerve tissue development.

Zavarzin's early research was with vision and insect ganglia (1911-1924). At the Military Medical Academy he was involved in studies on the inflammatory response. He introduced evolutionary thinking into medical research and guided numerous students. He wrote a textbook of histology which went through six editions from 1930 to 1950. He proposed a theory of parallelism of histological structure in 1934. He examined the evolution of multicellularity.
