= Alatyr, Chuvash Republic =

Town in the Chuvash Republic, Russia

Alatyr Алатырь
- Town

Other transcription(s)
  - Chuvash: Улатӑр
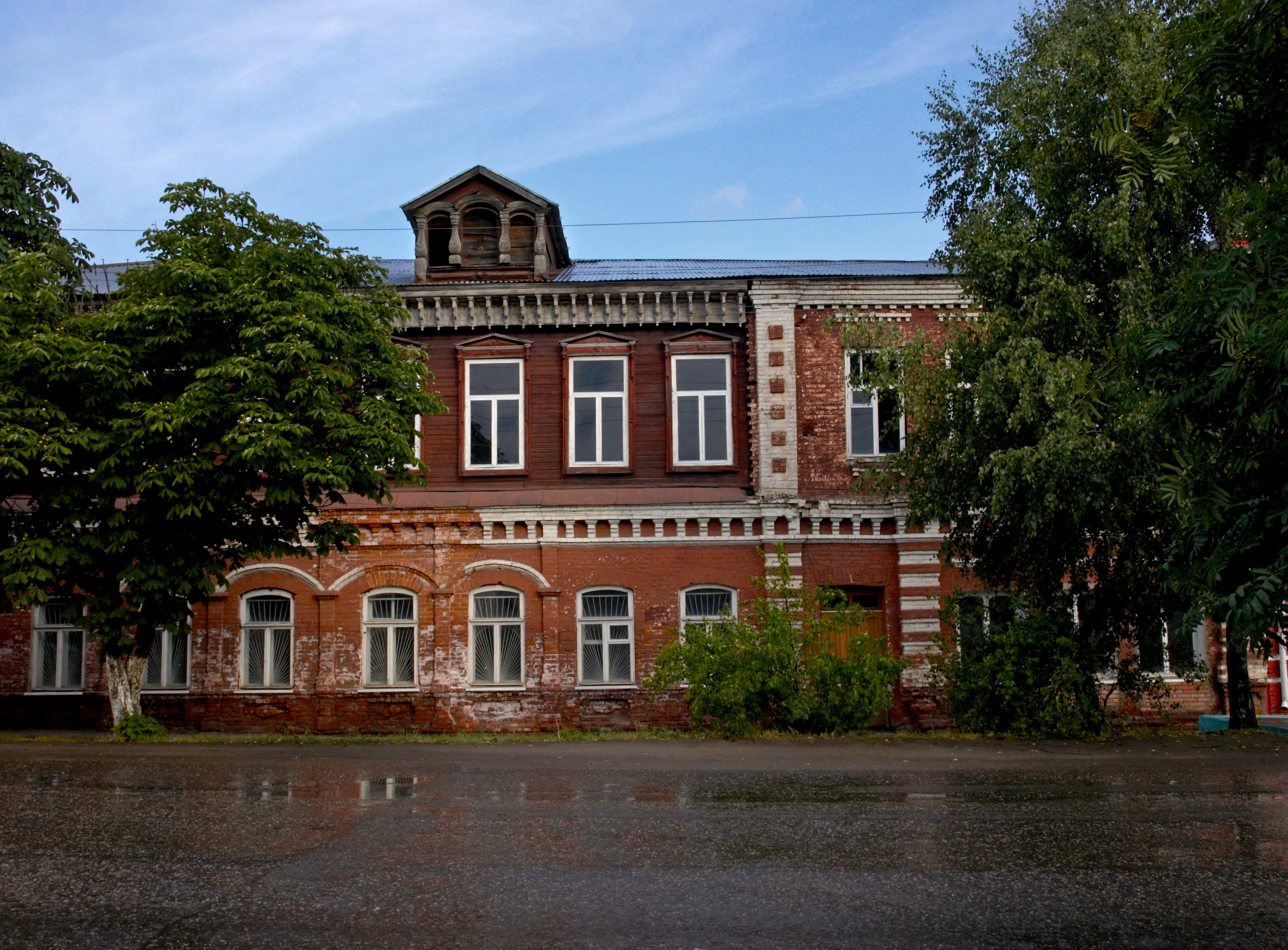
- An old building in the central part of Alatyr

- Flag Coat of arms
- Interactive map of Alatyr
- Location of Alatyr Alatyr (Chuvash Republic)
- Coordinates: 54°51′N 46°35′E
- Country: Russia
- Federal subject: Chuvashia
- Founded: 1552
- Town status since: 1780

Government
  - Head: Mikhail Mariskin
- Elevation: 130 m (430 ft)

Population (2010 Census)
  - Total: 38,203
  - Estimate (2021): 32,265 (−15.5%)

Administrative status
  - Subordinated to: Town of Alatyr
  - Capital of: Town of Alatyr, Alatyrsky District

Municipal status
  - Urban okrug: Alatyr Urban Okrug
  - Capital of: Alatyr Urban Okrug, Alatyrsky Municipal District
- Time zone: UTC+3 (MSK)
- Postal code: 429820-429828
- Dialing code: +7 83531
- OKTMO ID: 97704000001
- Town Day: First Saturday of August
- Website: gov.cap.ru/main.asp?govid=56

Alatyr (Russian: Ала́тырь; Chuvash: Улатӑр, romanized: Ulatăr) is a town in the Chuvash Republic, Russia, located on the Sura River at its confluence with the Alatyr River. Population: 38,203 (2010 census); 43,161 (2002 Census); 46,593 (1989 Soviet census); 43,000 (1968).

== History ==
Alatyr is one of the oldest towns in the republic. It was founded in 1552, succeeding the outpost of Kurmysh, which had served as the easternmost Russian outpost for two centuries. Alatyr originally served as a fortified outpost where an old Mordvin village once stood, and it was granted town status in 1780. Alatyr gained economic importance in 1894 after the construction of the Moscow—Ryazan—Kazan railroad.

== Administrative and municipal status ==
Within the framework of administrative divisions, Alatyr serves as the administrative center of Alatyrsky District, even though it is not a part of it. As an administrative division, it is incorporated separately as the town of republic significance of Alatyr—an administrative unit with the status equal to that of the districts. As a municipal division, the town of republic significance of Alatyr is incorporated as Alatyr Urban Okrug.

== Demographics ==
- Russians: 87.3%
- Mordvins: 7.2%
- Chuvash: 4.1%
- Others: 1.4%

== Gallery ==
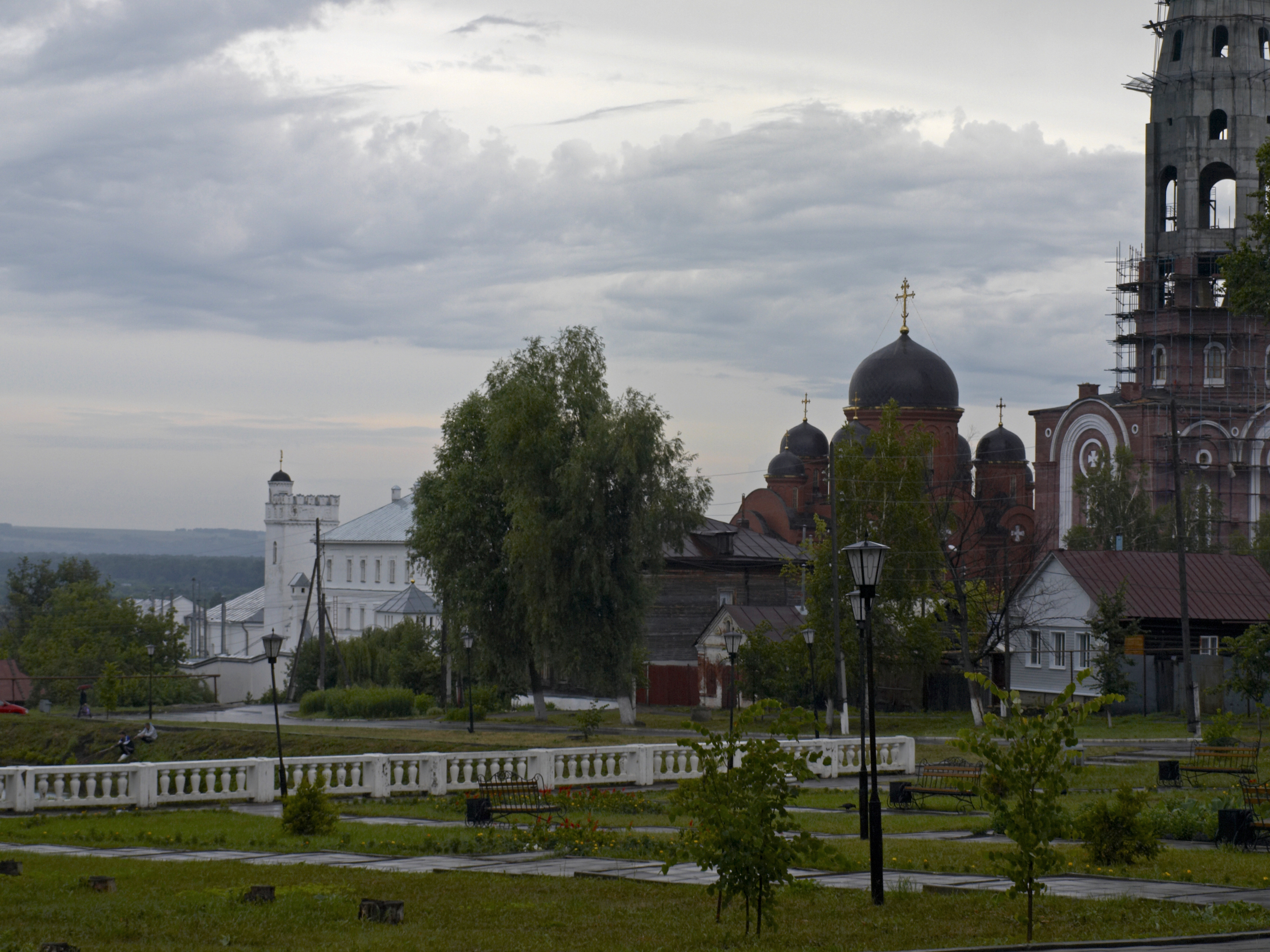
Holy Trinity Monastery, Alatyr
