= Pozharsky District =

Pozharsky District Пожарский район (Russian)
- District
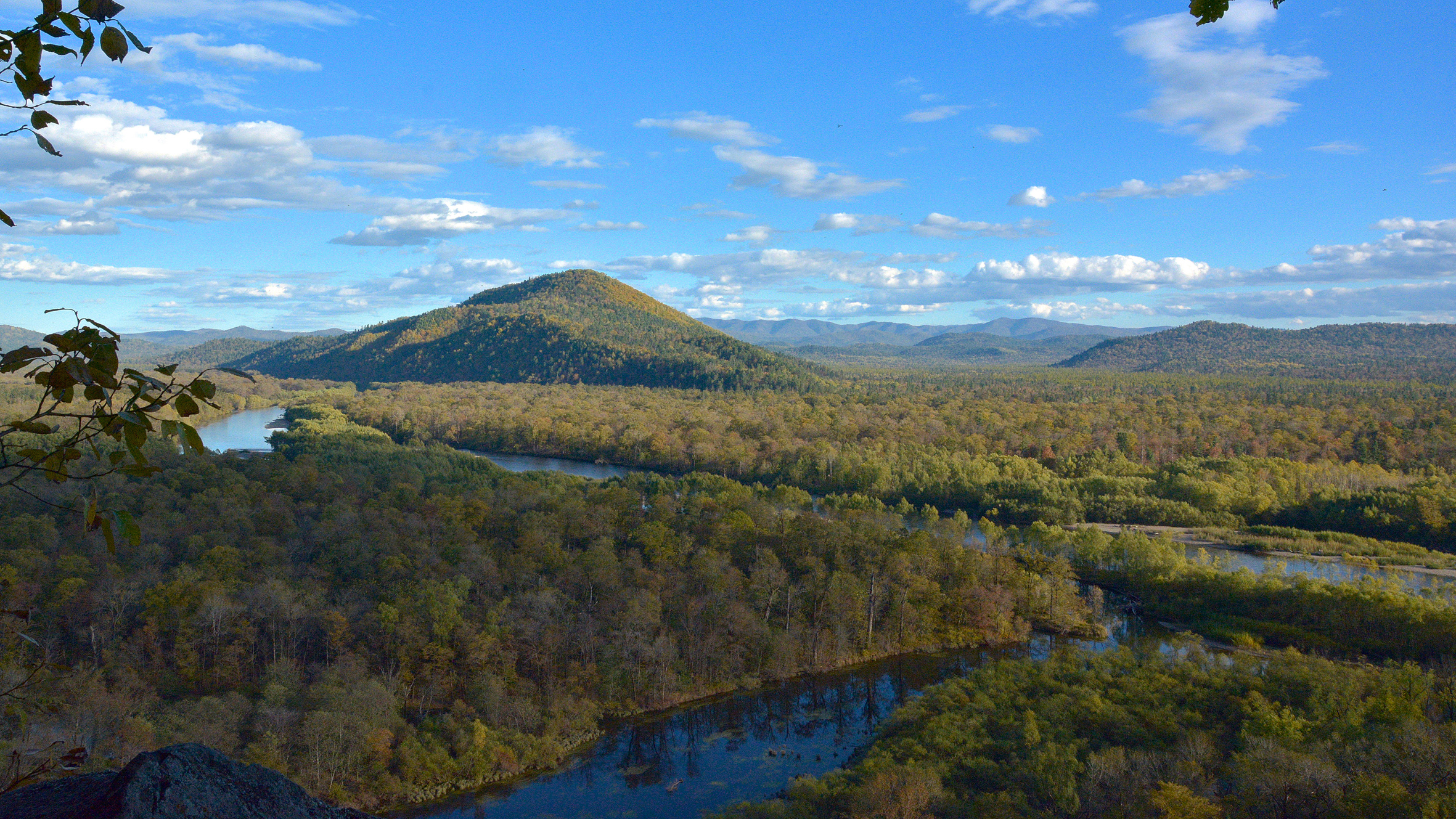
- Bikin River Valley, Pozharsky District

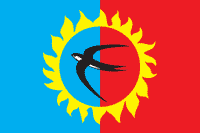
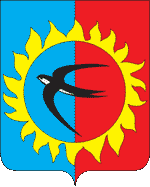
- Flag Coat of arms
- Anthem: Anthem of Pozharsky District
- Location of Pozharsky District in Primorsky Krai
- Coordinates: 46°40′N 136°00′E
- Country: Russia
- Federal subject: Primorsky Krai
- Established: September 14, 1939
- Administrative center: Luchegorsk

Area
  - Total: 22,570.3 km^{2} (8,714.4 sq mi)

Population (2010 Census)
  - Total: 31,086
  - Density: 1.3773/km^{2} (3.5672/sq mi)
  - Urban: 67.6%
  - Rural: 32.4%

Administrative structure
  - Inhabited localities: 1 urban-type settlements, 23 rural localities

Municipal structure
  - Municipally incorporated as: Pozharsky Municipal District
  - Municipal divisions: 1 urban settlements, 9 rural settlements
- Time zone: UTC+10 (MSK+7)
- OKTMO ID: 05534000
- Website: http://www.apmrpk.ru/

Pozharsky District (Russian: Пожа́рский райо́н) is an administrative and municipal district (raion), one of the twenty-two in Primorsky Krai, Russia. It is located in the northern and northwestern parts of the krai and borders with Khabarovsk Krai in the north, Terneysky District in the east and southeast, Krasnoarmeysky District in the south, Dalnerechensky District in the southwest, and with China in the west. The area of the district is 22,570.3 square kilometers (8,714.4 sq mi). Its administrative center is the urban locality (an urban-type settlement) of Luchegorsk. Population: 31,086 (2010 census); 34,120 (2002 census); 35,826 (1989 Soviet census). The population of Luchegorsk accounts for 67.6% of the district's total population.

== History ==
The district was established on September 14, 1939 and is named after Ivan Pozharsky, a Hero of the Soviet Union who died during the Battle of Lake Khasan in 1938.

== Population ==
Ethnic composition (2010):

- Russians – 91.6%
- Ukrainians – 3.5%
- Udege – 1.7%
- Nanai – 0.8%
- Others – 2.4%

== Notable residents ==
- Viktor Barannikov (1940–1995, born in Fedosyevka), Soviet and Russian Interior Minister 1991–1993
- Pavel Sulyandziga (born 1962 in Olon), Udege indigenous rights activist
