= Simbirsk Governorate =

1796–1928 unit of Russia

Coordinates: 54.3167°N 48.3667°E

Simbirsk Governorate Симбирская губерния
- Governorate of the Russian Empire (1796–1917), Russian Republic and RSFSR (1917–1928)
- 1796–1928
- Coat of arms

- Location within the Russian Empire
- Capital: Simbirsk (1924 as Ulyanovsk)
- Area
- 49,495 km^{2} (19,110 sq mi)
- Population
  - 1897: 1,527,848
- History
  - Established: 1796
  - Disestablished: 1928
Preceded by	Succeeded by
Simbirsk Viceroyalty	Ulyanovsk Okrug

Historical population
Year	Pop.	±%
1897	1,527,848	—
1905	1,750,600	+14.6%
1910	1,549,008	−11.5%
1920	1,622,702	+4.8%
1926	1,384,220	−14.7%

Simbirsk Governorate (Russian: Симбирская губерния, romanized: Simbirskaya guberniya) was an administrative-territorial unit (guberniya) of the Russian Empire and the Russian SFSR, which existed from 1796 to 1928. Its administrative center was in the city of Simbirsk, renamed Ulyanovsk in 1924 (likewise, Simbirsk Governorate was named Ulyanovsk Governorate).

== History ==
=== Ulyanovsk Governorate (1924–1928) ===
By a decree of the Central Executive Committee of the Soviet Union of May 9, 1924, the city of Simbirsk has renamed Ulyanovsk, which included the volost, the uyezd, and the governorate itself.

In 1925, the Alatyrsky uezd was transferred to the Chuvash ASSR and 4 uezds remained in the Ulyanovsk Governorate: Ardatovsk, Karsunsk, Syzransk, and Ulyanovsk.

On January 6, 1926, by the decision of the Samara Governorate Executive Committee, the Melekessky uyezd was transferred to the Ulyanovsk governorate.

On May 14, 1928, during the economic zoning of the USSR, the governorate was abolished, and its territory became part of the Ulyanovsk Okrug, the Mordovsk Okrug, and the Syzran Okrug of the Middle Volga Oblast.

== Subdivisions ==
- Alatyrsky Uyezd
- Ardatovsky Uyezd
- Buinsky Uyezd
- Karsunsky Uyezd
- Kurmyshsky Uyezd
- Sengileyevsky Uyezd
- Simbirsky Uyezd
- Syzransky Uyezd

== Demographics ==
In 1897 there was 1,527,848 people.

=== Ethnic groups ===
(1897)
Uyezd	Russian	Mordvin	Chuvash	Tatar
Alatyrsky	73,0 %	26,7 %		
Ardatovsk	59,6 %	39,4 %		
Buinsky	17,3 %	3,8 %	44,3 %	34,6 %
Karsunsky	85,3 %	8,3 %	2,3 %	3,9 %
Kurmyshsky	52,5 %	6,4 %	25,9 %	15,0 %
Sengileyevsky	78,9 %	10,7 %	4,6 %	4,5 %
Simbirsky	77,1 %	4,9 %	7,4 %	9,8 %
Syzransky	88,7 %	4,1 %	3,4 %	3,1 %
Total	68,0 %	12,4 %	10,5 %	8,8 %

=== Religion ===
(1898)
Orthodox Christianity	Islam	Schism	Baptist Tatars	Catholic Christianity	Protestant Christianity	Judaism	Paganism
1 407 317	144 440	31 384	4 031	1 831	1 283	472	441
