= Marcellino =

Marcellino is an Italian given name. Notable people with the name include:

- Marcellino d'Atri (1659–1716), Capuchin missionary from Atri in the Kingdom of Naples, spent years in the Kingdom of Kongo
- Marcellino de Baggis (1971–2011), Italian cinematographer and director
- Marcellino da Civezza (1822–1906), Italian Franciscan author
- Pietro Marcellino Corradini (1658–1743), Italian Roman Catholic cardinal
- Marcellino Gavilán (1909–1999), Spanish horse rider and Olympics competitor
- Marcellino van der Leeuw (born 1990), Dutch footballer
- Marcellino Lefrandt (born 1974), Indonesian actor and lecturer
- Marcellino Lucchi (born 1957), Italian former Grand Prix motorcycle road racer
- Ss. Marcellino e Pietro, two 4th century Christian martyrs in the city of Rome
- Marcellino Pipite, Vanuatuan politician first elected to Parliament in 2004

== See also ==
- Marcellino (surname), Italian surname
- San Marcellino, comune (municipality) in the Province of Caserta in the Italian region Campania
- San Marcellino, Cremona, church in Cremona
- Toto and Marcellino, a 1958 Italian-French comedy film directed by Antonio Musu
- Santi Marcellino e Pietro (disambiguation)
- Marcelin (disambiguation)
- Marcelino
- Marcell (disambiguation)
- Marcelli
- Marcellin (disambiguation)
- Marcello
- Marcelo
