= Ricca =

Ricca may refer to:

== Surname ==
- Battista Mario Salvatore Ricca (born 1956), prelate of the Vatican Bank
- Bernardino Ricca (1450–?), Italian painter
- Federico Ricca (born 1994), Uruguayan footballer
- Giorgia Ricca, Italian curler
- Giovanni Ricca (1603–c. 1656), Italian painter
- Jim Ricca (1927–2007), American football player
- Pasquale Ricca (1854–1910), Italian painter and sculptor
- Paul Ricca (1897–1972), Italian-American mobster
- Pietro Ricca (1838–?), Italian painter
- Prospero Ricca (1838–1895), Italian painter
- Renzo L. Ricca (born 1960), Italian-born applied mathematician

== Given name ==
- Ricca Allen (1863–1949), Canadian-born stage and film actress
- Ricca Slone (born 1947), former member of the Illinois House of Representatives

== Place ==
- Palazzo Ricca, Naples
- Riccas Corner, California

== Legendary characters ==
- Rhitta Gawr, sometimes called Ricca, a Welsh giant
- Ricca, chief elder of Cornwall in Culhwch and Olwen, possibly Ricatus king of Cornwall
