= Guindani =

Guindani is an Italian surname from Cremona. Notable people with the surname include:

- Dante Guindani (1899–1929), Italian cyclist
- Gaetano Guindani (1834–1904), Italian Roman Catholic bishop
- Luciana Guindani (1937–2020), Italian sprint canoer
- Manolo Guindani (born 1971), Italian manager and footballer
