= Andrea Scutellari =

Italian painter

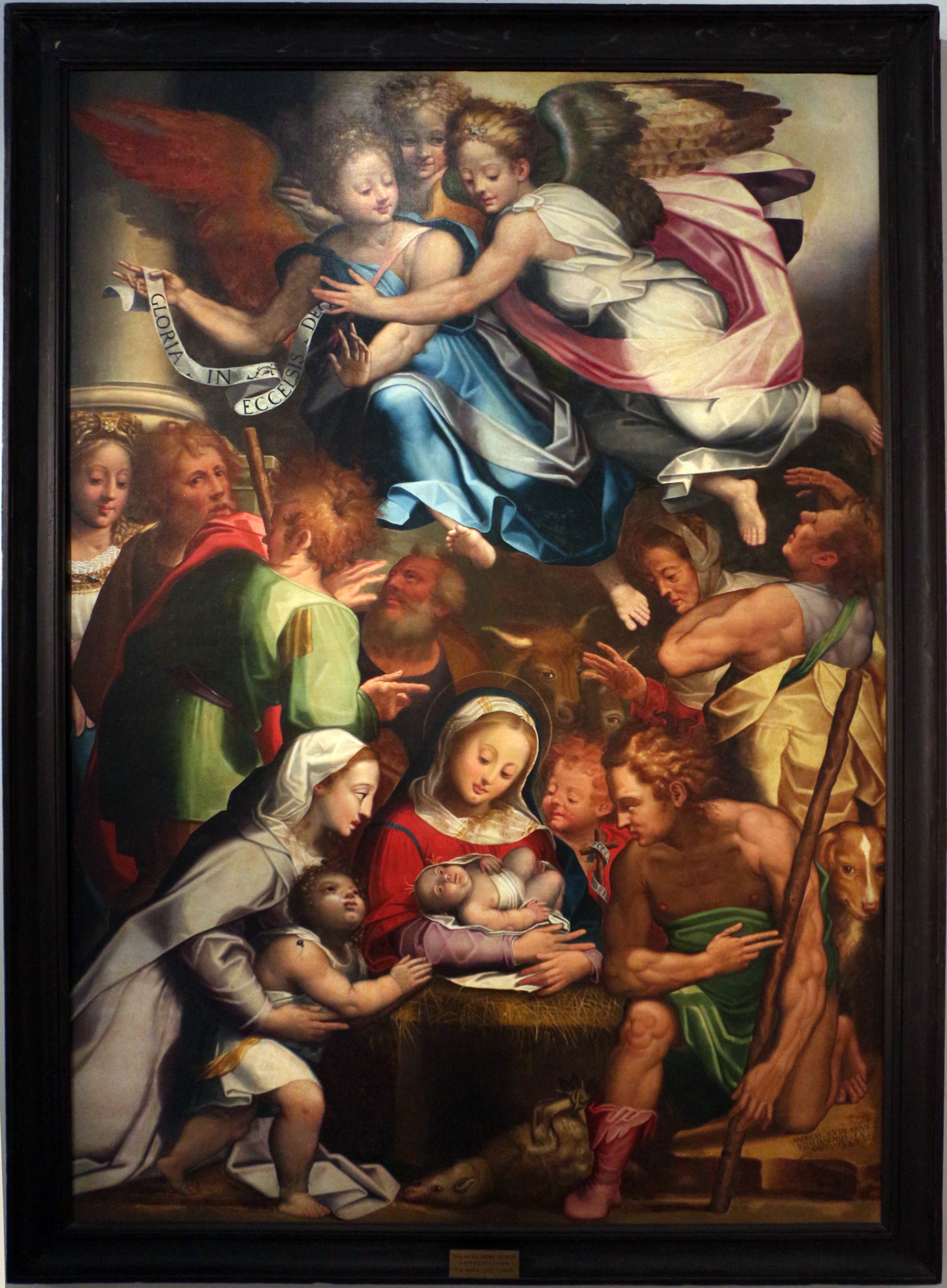
The Adoration of the Shepherds with Saints Quirico and Jiulitta, circa 1775, Museo Civico Ala Ponzone

Andrea Scutellari or Andrea da Viadana (16th-century) was an Italian painter of the Renaissance period. He was active in Cremona and his native Viadana, working alongside his brother, Francesco. Andrea painted a Annunziata (1588) for the church of Sant'Agata, Cremona.
