= Manfredini family of painters (Cremona) =

Two generations of the Manfredini family of painters were active in Cremona during the 18th and 19th centuries.

Giovanni Manfredini (Cremona, 1730- Cremona, 9 December 1790) was an Italian painter and architect.

He was a pupil of Giovanni Battista Zaist. He also worked as an architect and decorator in Cremona. He worked in the hall of canenichesse of San Benedetto, and painted for the salons in the houses of the Magio and Gerenzani families. His major work in Cremona was painting the interior of the church of San Faccio, also called Il Foppone. The ceilings are painted with architectural motifs and fixtures. The spandrels of the cupola are painted with the four virtues. The cupola is decorated with the apostles.

The three sons of Giovanni were painters. The oldest, Paolo Manfredini, (1754-25 November 1805) had modest talents. One of the middle sons, Giuseppe Manfredini, was an ornamental painter, painting in the salons of the houses of Manna e Stanga in the Stanga. Giuseppe moved to Brescia, where he died in 1815. The youngest brother, Serafino Manfredini, showed the most talent. He painted extensively in the Cathedral of Cremona: in 1823, he decorated the chapel of the Blessed Virgen del popolo; in 1825, the chapel of the Blessed Sacrament; and in 1826, he repainted the altarpiece of Annunziata, originally by Malosso.
