= Lazzaroni (surname) =

Lazzaroni is an Italian surname. Notable people with the surname include:

- David Lazzaroni (born 1985), French ski jumper
- Franco Lazzaroni (born 1988), Argentine footballer
- Giovanni Battista Lazzaroni, Italian Baroque painter
- Marco Lazzaroni (born 1995), Italian rugby union player
- Stefania Lazzaroni, Italian long jumper
