= Marcellino (surname) =

Marcellino is an Italian surname. Notable people with the surname include:

- Carl L. Marcellino (born 1942), member of the New York State Senate
- Dennis Marcellino (born 1948), American musician, speaker and author of psychology, philosophy, theology and political books
- Fred Marcellino (1939–2001), American illustrator and later an author of children's books
- Jocko Marcellino (born 1950), American singer, musician, songwriter, producer and actor, one of the founders of Sha Na Na
- Muzzy Marcellino (1912–1997), American singer and musician, known primarily for his clear, melodious style of whistling
- Noella Marcellino, (born 1951), American Benedictine nun who has earned a doctorate in microbiology from the University of Connecticut
- P.J. Marcellino (born 1978), Portuguese-Canadian filmmaker
- Raffaele Marcellino (born 1964), Australian composer

== See also ==
- Marcellino
- Marcelli
