= Andrea Mainardi =

Italian painter

Andrea Mainardi, also known as il Chiaveghino, (active 1590–1613) was an Italian painter of the late-Renaissance period, active in Cremona.

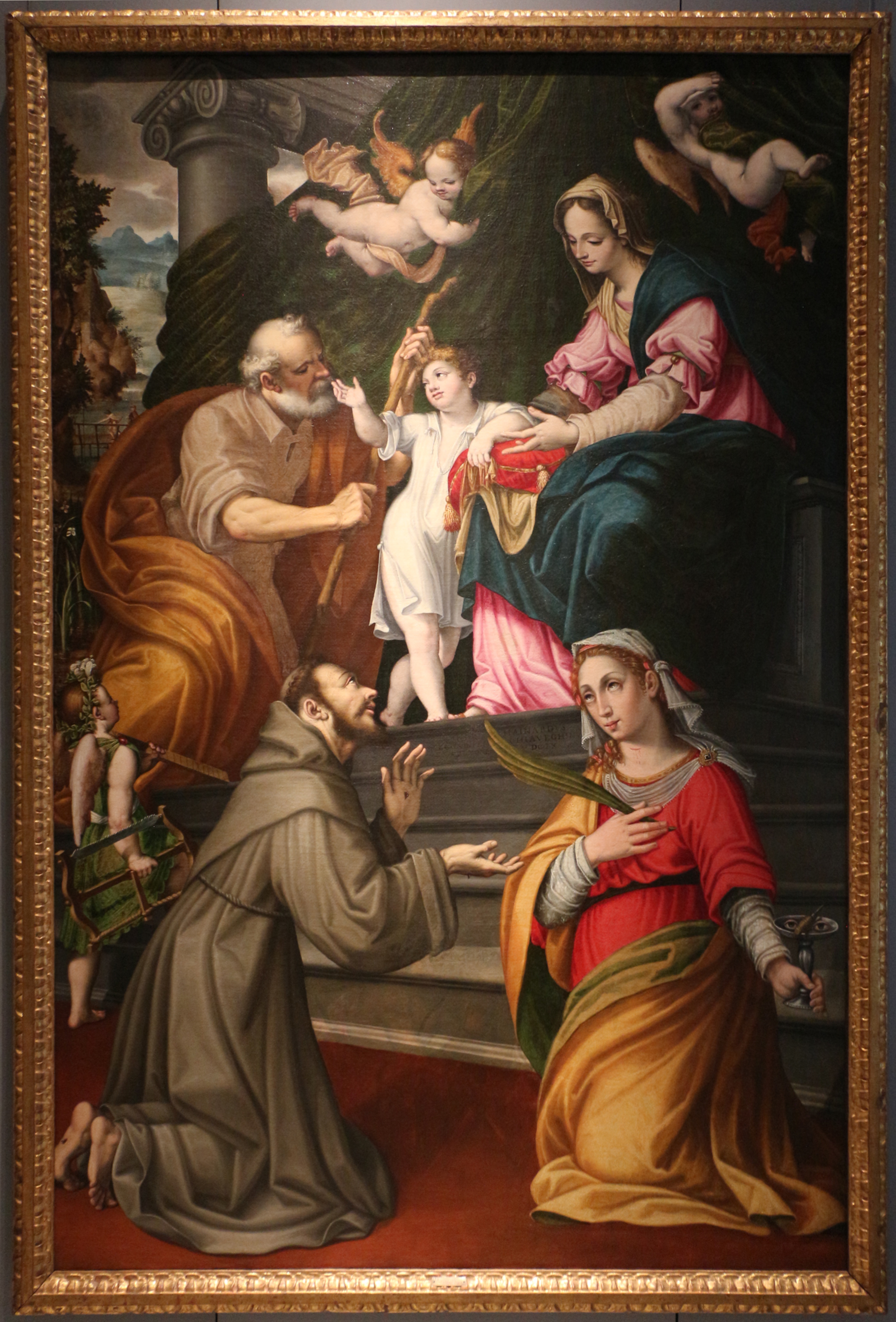
Madonna with Child between Saint Francis, Saint Joseph And Saint Lucy

Mainardi and his nephew Marcantonio, were pupils of Bernardino Campi in Cremona. He painted the main altarpiece depicting Christ healing the Blind for the church of San Facio. He opened a school or studio with Giovanni Battista Trotti in Cremona. Among the pupils at this school were Giovanni Battista Tortiroli and Carlo Natali. Marcantonio was still active in 1628.
