= Lazzaroni (disambiguation) =

Lazzaroni is an Italian brand of biscuits and cookies made by the company D. Lazzaroni & C. Spa.

Lazzaroni may also refer to:

- Lazzaroni (surname), an Italian surname
- Naples Lazzaroni or "lazzari", the lower class of 18th century Naples
- Scientific Lazzaroni, a 19th-century group of American scientists
