= Luigi Voghera =

Italian architect

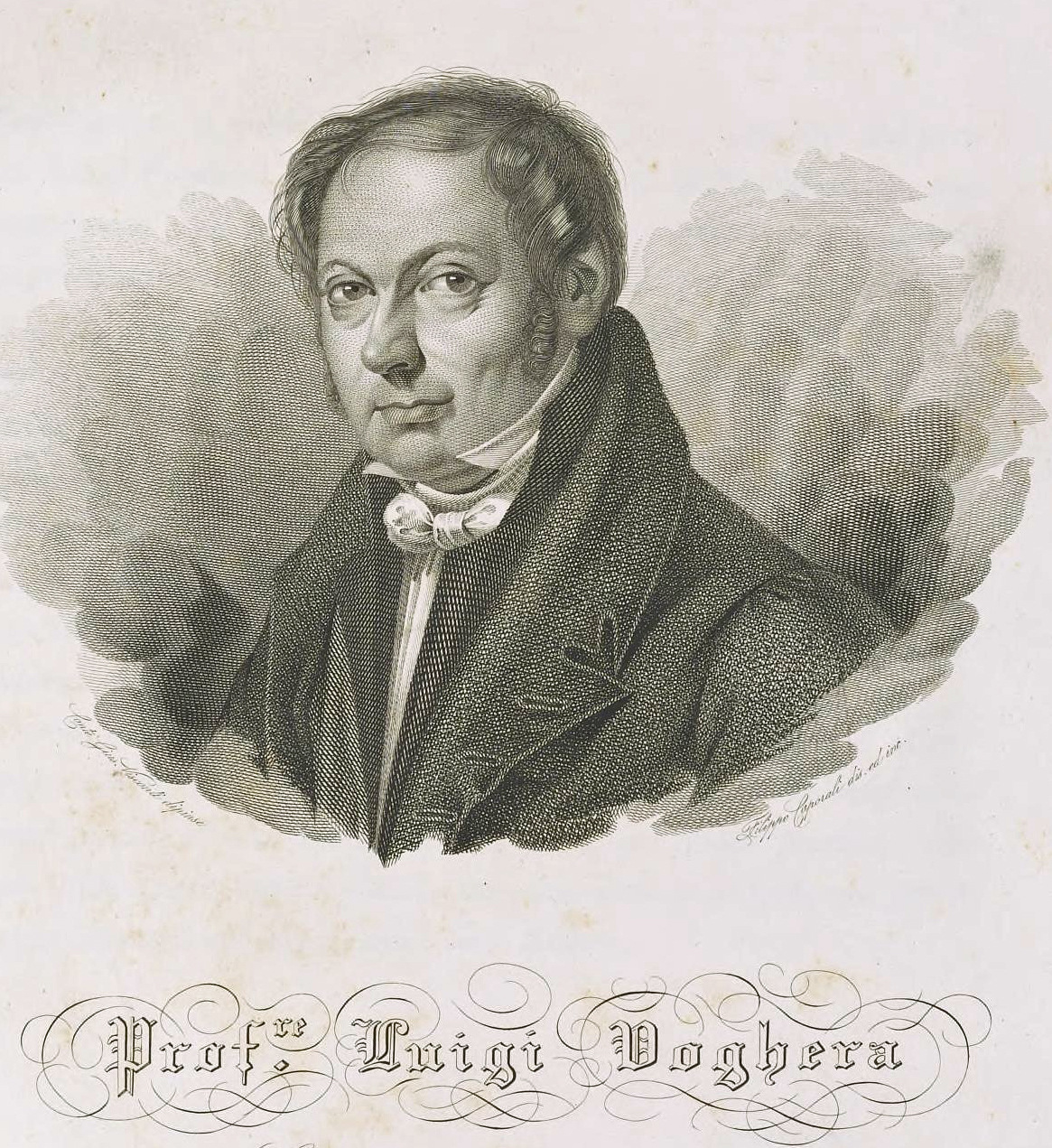
Luigi Voghera

Luigi Voghera (1788–1840) was an Italian architect of the Neoclassical period. He was born an active in Cremona. He built a new façade for the church of Sant'Agata in Cremona. He created in 1821 the first design for the Cimitero (Cemetery) of Cremona, but which was not completed till the 20th century with the intervention of other architects.
