= Agostino Bonisoli =

Italian painter (1633–1700)

Agostino Bonisoli (1633–1700) was an Italian painter of the Baroque period, who was born and worked mainly in Cremona. He was the pupil of the slightly older painter Giovanni Battista Tortiroli, and afterward studied under a relation named Luigi Miradoro Agostino Bonisoli. He was more indebted to his own natural abilities and his studies of the works of Paolo Veronese than either his instructors. He was chiefly employed in easel pictures of portraits, and of religious and historical subjects. His largest work was painted in the Church of San Francesco, Cremona, depicting a dispute between St Anthony and the tyrant Ezzelino.

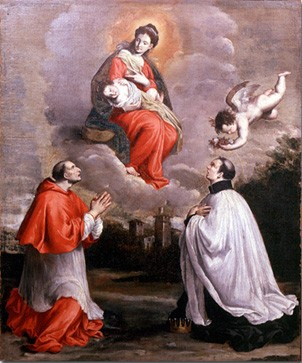
1695 work by Agostino Bonisoli, with Charles Borromeo (left) and Louis Gonzaga.
