= San Michele, Cremona =

Roman Catholic church

Coordinates: 45°08′07″N 10°01′59″E

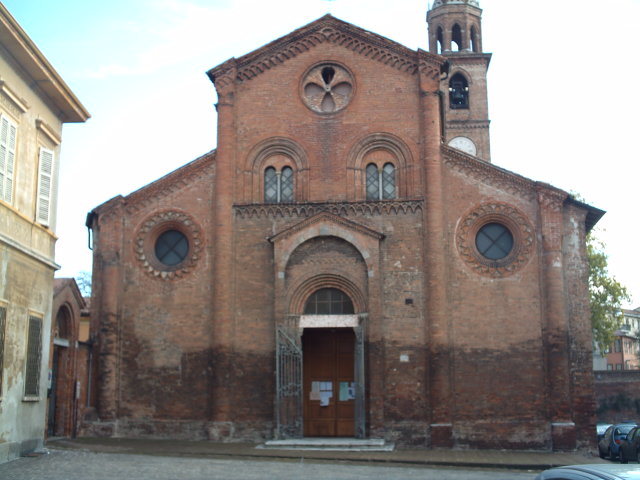
San Michele.

San Michele is a Romanesque-style, Roman Catholic church located in the city of Cremona, region of Lombardy, Italy.

== History ==
According to tradition, it would have been built by the Lombards, who venerated the archangel St Michael, although its existence is documented from the 8th century, prior to Lombard rule of Cremona.

In the 11th century a new basilica was built. In the 13th century it received a new campanile (belfry), and the naves were vaulted with pointed arches. In the crypt are elements dating to the early Middle Ages crypt, one of which attributed to the Lombard age. The apse, as well as the other church of San Vincenzo in Cremona, resembles that of the Nonantola Abbey.

The church includes a statue portraying "St Michael Subjugating the Beast" and located to the right of the high altar.

== Sources ==
- Bonometti, Pietro (1988). Cremona: una città segreta. Bologna: Edizioni Italcards. pp. 54–61.
