= Cremona Courthouse =

Judiciary building in Cremona, Italy

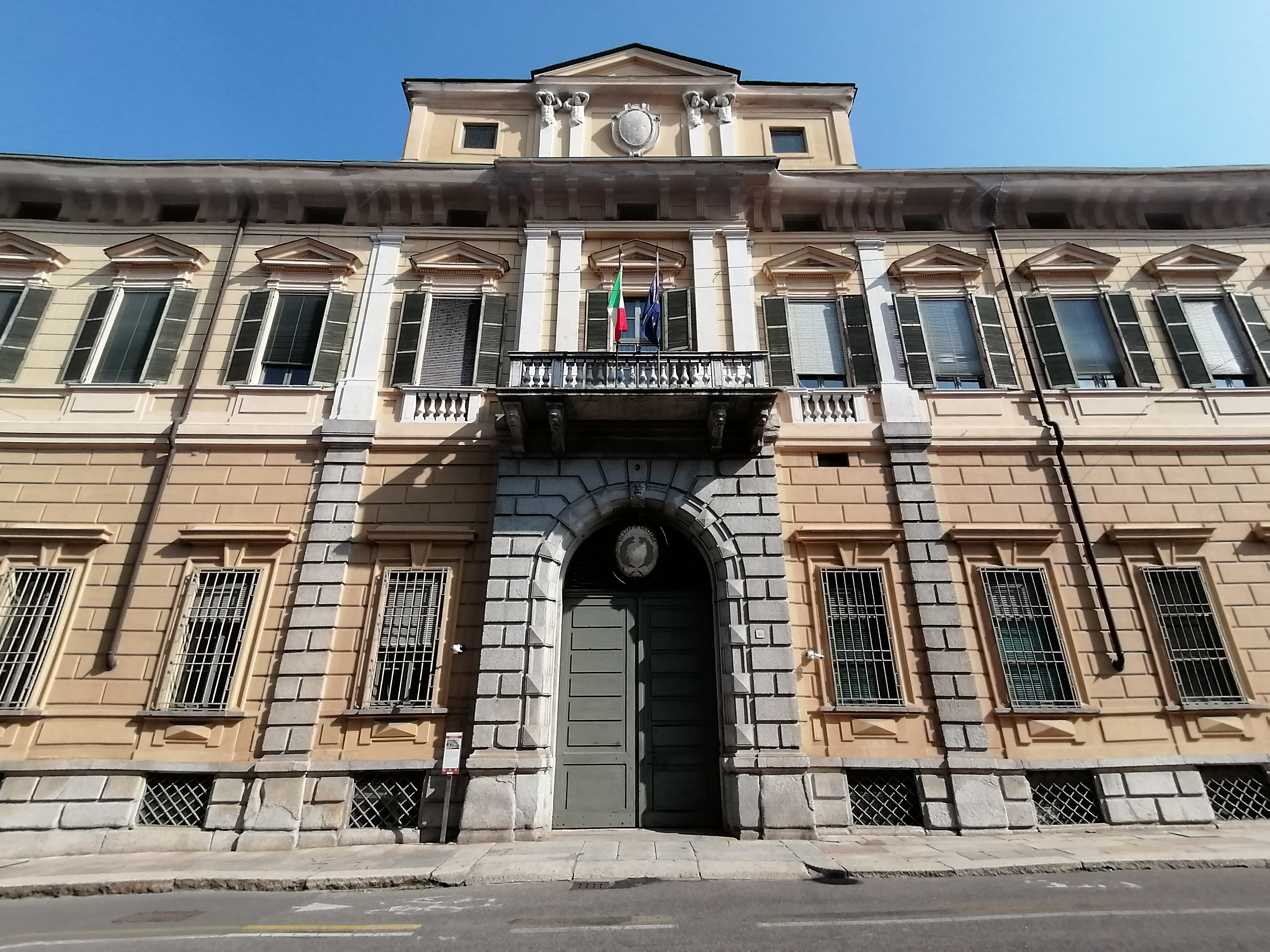
- Interactive map of the Cremona Courthouse area

General information
- Architectural style: Neoclassical
- Location: Cremona, Lombardy, Italy
- Coordinates: 45°07′59.7″N 10°01′06.7″E
- Completed: 1799

Design and construction
- Architect: Faustino Rodi

The Cremona Courthouse (Palazzo di Giustizia) is a building located on Via dei Tribunali in Cremona, Italy. Dating back to the late 18th century, it was known as Palazzo Silva-Persichelli and currently houses the Court, the Public Prosecutor's Office, and the judicial offices of Cremona.

== History ==
The origins of the building date back to at least the 16th century, when the site was occupied by residential structures, including a house belonging to Francesco Amidani. In the early 17th century, several medieval properties in the area were purchased by the Cauzzi family. These included the Casa Angelo Custode, Casa Ansaldi, and Casa Gadi—all located along the so-called Contrada Bassa (now Via Ruggero Manna). Toward the end of the century, the properties were sold to Gian Battista Silva.

In 1799, architect Faustino Rodi was tasked with redesigning the palazzo for Silva. Rodi, known for other works in Cremona such as the reconstruction of Porta San Luca (now Porta Milano) and modifications to Palazzo Stanga, originally planned an entrance and grand staircase from Via Manna. However, due to the cost of demolishing older buildings, the entrance was ultimately positioned along Via dei Tribunali.

The palazzo passed into the hands of Antonio Persichelli in the 19th century. In 1847, Persichelli donated the building to the Jesuits, who established the Collegio Fagnani there in 1853, in honor of Milanese benefactor Federico Fagnani. During the aftermath of the battle of Solferino (1859), the building was used as a field hospital for wounded soldiers. Following the unification of Italy, in 1865, it was repurposed to house the Court and the judicial offices. The building replaced the original courthouse, which was housed in the Palazzo Pretorio, once located in the area now bordered by Via Monteverdi, Via Longobardi, Piazza Stradivari, and Piazza della Pace.

== Description ==
The building exemplifies late 18th-century Neoclassical architecture in Lombardy. The principal façade is organized according to a tripartite scheme, with slightly recessed lateral wings and a central projecting bay. It is faced with dressed ashlar masonry and articulated by a restrained classical vocabulary. The entrance axis is marked by a balconied piano nobile, surmounted by a straight tympanum supported by sculpted telamons.

Fenestration is rhythmically distributed across the elevation, with upper-story windows capped by triangular pediments that reinforce the classical hierarchy of forms.

Internally, the main portal leads to a system of two symmetrical porticoed courtyards, which serve both functional circulation and compositional symmetry. From these, a covered grand staircase—richly adorned with stuccowork—provides vertical access to the upper levels. Several interior rooms on the ground and first floors preserve significant 19th-century decorative schemes, including polychrome frescoes and white-and-gold stucco ornamentation, which testify to the building's successive adaptations for institutional use.

A curious feature of the building is a metal plaque affixed to its façade facing Via Ruggero Manna, installed by Persichelli in 1820. The plaque sets a height limit on the building opposite, ensuring an unobstructed view of the distant Po River from the upper floors of the palazzo. Remarkably, this restriction is still visibly respected today.

== Sources ==
- "Il palazzo di giustizia di Cremona". La Provincia. 12 June 1966.
- Volonté, Marina (2021). "Cremona, Palazzo Silva-Persichelli: un reimpiego tardosettecentesco di pavimenti antichi?". Atti del XXVI colloquio dell'Associazione italiana per lo studio e la conservazione del mosaico. Rome: Quasar.
