= San Facio, Cremona =

Church building in Lombardy, Italy

Coordinates: 45.13733°N 10.02690°E

San Facio, also commonly called the Chiesa del Foppone, is a late Baroque architecture, Roman Catholic, now deconsecrated church in Cremona, region of Lombardy, Italy. The church was completed in 1781, to officiate the burials in the surrounding ossuary of those dying in the adjacent hospital (Ospedale Maggiore e Ospedale Vecchio) of Cremona. It was called Foppone because of it operational similarity to the Nuovi Sepolcri (1695) in Milan. The surrounding large cemetery crypts in the portico formed part of an 18th-century urge to provide, systematize, and formalize the burials for the indigent.

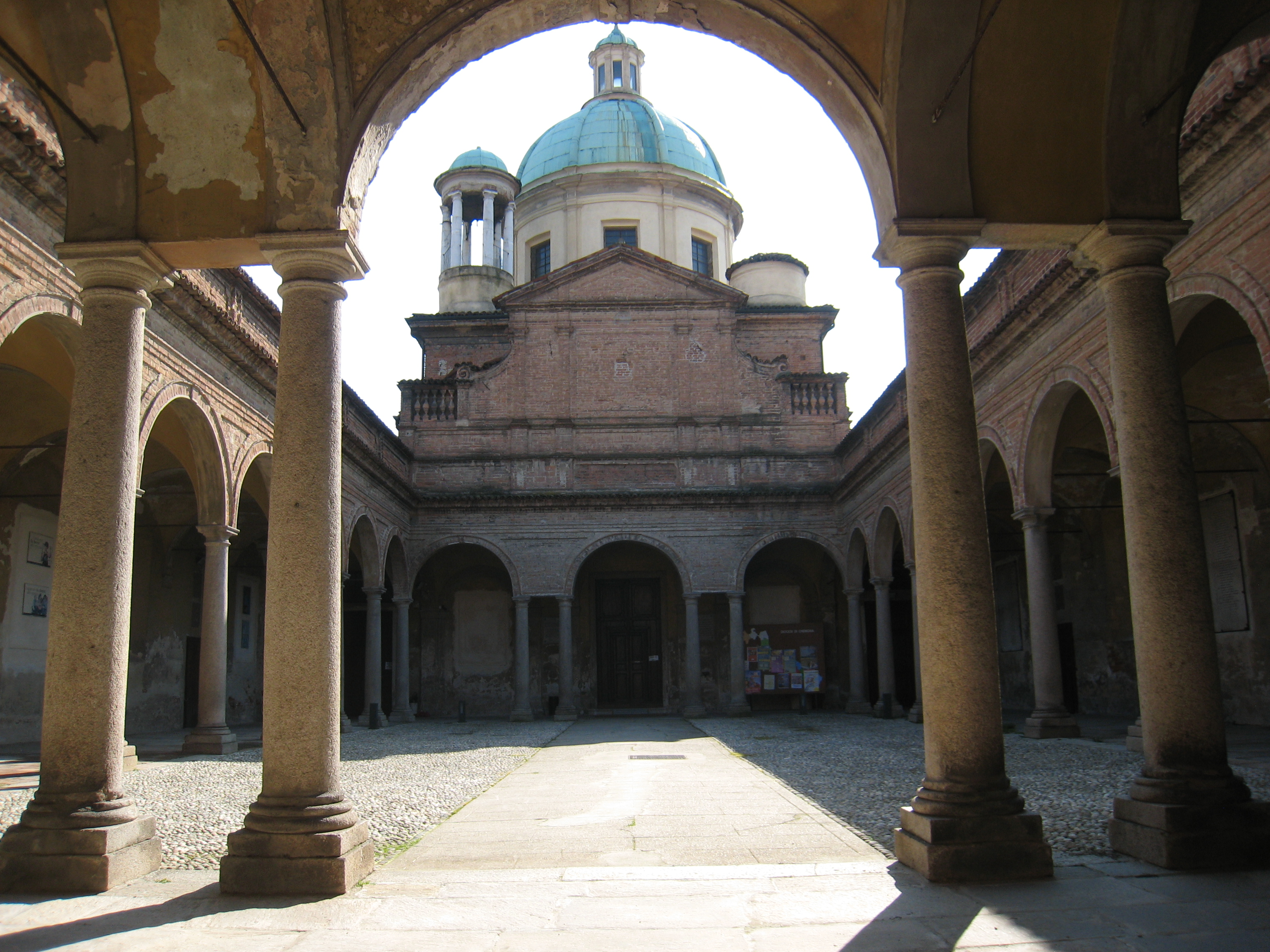
Church of il Foppone from inside courtyard.

From the courtyard, the architecture seems dour except for the domes of the church. The interior of the church in Greek Cross layout, is decorated by Giovanni Manfredini with Grotteschi, an ornamentation then utilized in cemetery churches due to their prevalence in Roman catacombs.

A guide from 1820 cites the first altar on the right of the entrance has a Caravaggesque canvas depicting Christ healing the blind man, by Pietro Martire Neri or Negri. The main altarpiece is a Deposition from the Cross with the Virgin Mother, the Magdalen, and Joseph d' Arimathea (1569) by Vincenzo Campi. The altar on the left, has a Virgin and Child with San Facio with a Basket of Bread dispensing food to the poor and maimed (1593) by Andrea Mainardi (called il Chiaveghino).

The site was closed for burials in the 1970s and administration transferred to the Commune.
