= Bernardino Ricca =

Italian painter

Bernardino Ricca or Ricco (Cremona, 1450-?) was an Italian painter.

In 1510, he frescoed the ceiling of the nave of the church of Sant'Agata, Cremona. The frescoes were destroyed in the 19th century reconstruction of the church. The frescoes had depicted a blue sky with leafy branches and putti. He also painted in the Cathedral alongside the painter Alessandro Pampurino. In the Church of San Pietro of Cremona, near the main portal, was a heavily retouched Pietà painted in 1521 by Bernadinus Richus.
