= San Marcellino, Cremona =

Church building in Cremona, Italy

San Marcellino, also known as Santi Marcellino e Pietro, is a Baroque-style, Roman Catholic church located on Via Ponchielli in Cremona, region of Lombardy, Italy.

== History and description ==
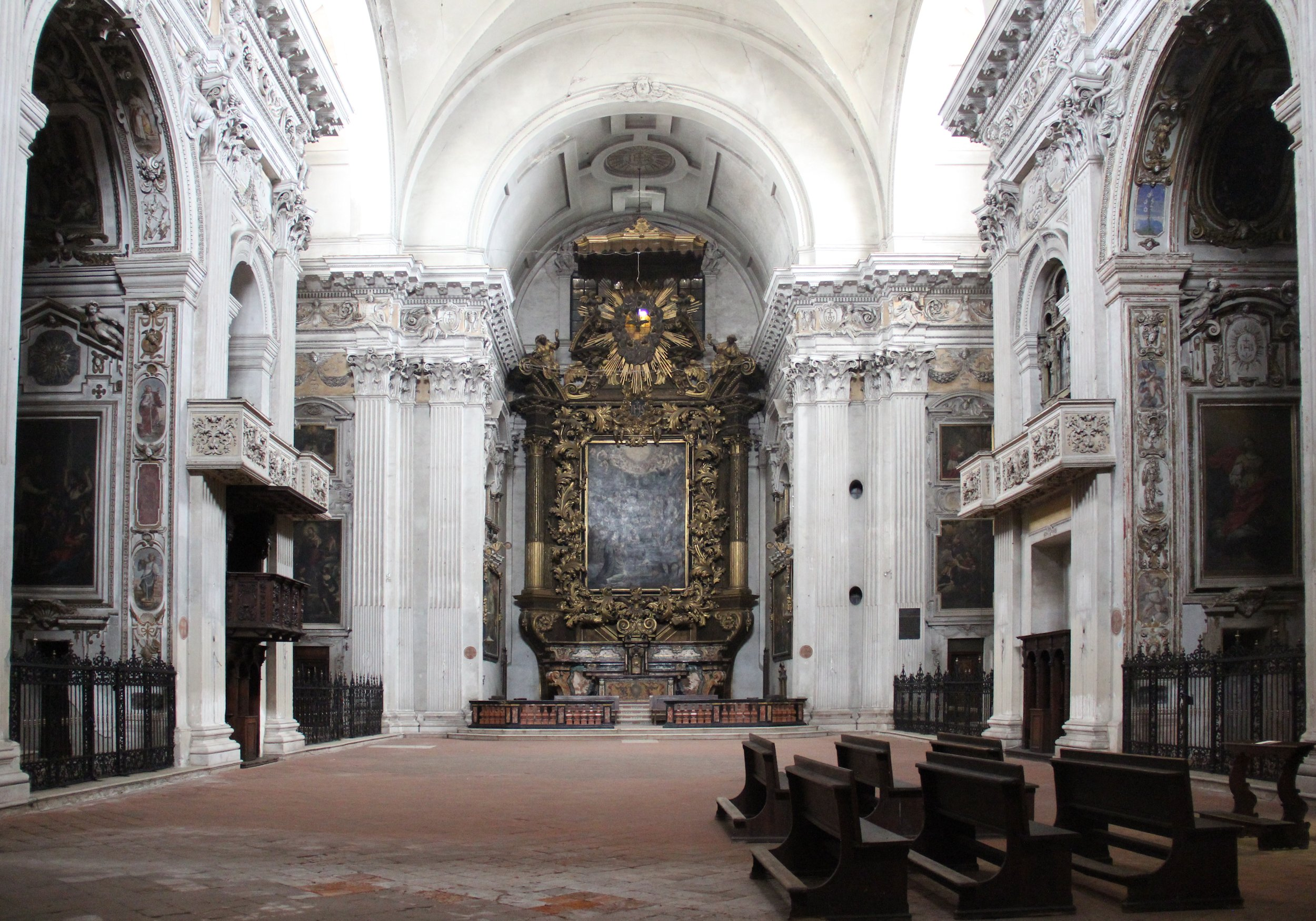
A view of the interior of the church of Santi Marcellino e Pietro, Cremona, Italy

The church was commissioned in 1602 by the Bishop Cesare Speciano from the architect Francesco Bigallo. The church and monastery were affiliated with the Jesuits, who completed the interiors. The facade remains incomplete, with monumental white marble corinthian pilasters and two niches in brick walls. In the second floor is a Serlian window with a heraldic shield below.

The interiors, in Baroque fashion, are elaborately ornamented with gilded stucco, and sport a number of lateral chapels. To the left of the entrance is a confessional with a canvas depicting a "Beatified Bishop" by Luigi Miradori. On the opposite side of the church is another confessional with a canvas by Giacomo Bertesi. The third altar on the right has an altarpiece depicting St Joseph and Child Jesus by Angelo Massarotti. At the end of the presbytery is a sculpted wood altar-frame by Bertesi, containing two canvases, used as a main altarpiece, depicting the St Marcellinus and St Peter the Exorcist baptizing the Jail-warden's daughter (1604) by Gervasio Gatti. Other artworks in the church include a canvas with a Crucifixion scene with the Madonna, Magdalen, John the Baptist, and Francis Xavier by Agostino Bonisoli; a St Ignatius of Loyola (1622) and a Transfer of the Relics of the Saints from the church of San Tommaso to the Cathedral by Angelo Massarotti; and a Life of Sant’Orsola and Presentation at the Temple (1652) by Luigi Miradori.
