= 1984 European Athletics Indoor Championships – Women's long jump =

The women's long jump event at the 1984 European Athletics Indoor Championships was held on 3 March.

== Results ==
Rank	Name	Nationality	#1	#2	#3	#4	#5	#6	Result	Notes
1st place, gold medalist(s)	Sue Hearnshaw	Great Britain	x	6.63	6.70	6.62	x	6.70	6.70	NR
2nd place, silver medalist(s)	Eva Murková	Czechoslovakia	6.47	6.55	6.46	6.51	6.54	6.47	6.55	
3rd place, bronze medalist(s)	Stefania Lazzaroni	Italy	5.80	x	6.08	5.78	5.87	x	6.08	
4	Pia Sandberg	Sweden	x	x	5.60	5.88	5.84	5.93	5.93	
5	Siv Christensen	Norway	x	5.68	5.61	5.65	x	x	5.68	
