= Girolamo del Prato =

Girolamo del Prato was an Italian draughtsman, sculptor, niellist, and goldsmith, flourished at Cremona in the first half of the 16th century. He has been sometimes called the Lombard Cellini.
