= Giovanni Battista Lazzaroni =

Italian painter

Giovanni Battista Lazzaroni (1626-1698) was an Italian painter of the Baroque period.

He was born in Cremona. He was a pupil of Giovanni Battista Tortiroli. He is known for painting in the style of Palma the Younger, depicting portraits and historical subjects. Active in Parma, Milan, and finally in Piacenza.
