= Alve Valdemi del Mare =

Italian painter (1885–1972)

Alve Valdemi del Mare (Cremona, 1885 — Barcelona, 1972) was an Italian painter established in Barcelona. Formed in Bergamo and in Milan. Later left to Paris, where he was called to fight in World War I. In 1926, he returned to Barcelona and collaborated with Sala Gaspar and La Pinacoteca. To artistic level, specialised in the dead natures and the paintings of flowers, although also preserve landscapes and his figures.
