= Dattaro family =

Francesco Dattaro (c. 1495 – 1576) and his son Giuseppe Dattaro (c. 1540 – 1616) are the two principal builders of the most important family of Cremonese architects of the fifteenth century. The Dattaros began their activity at the construction site of the Cathedral of Cremona, joining the painters, members of the cabinet making Sacca family, and the engineer Antonio Melone.
