= Giovanni Battista Tortiroli =

Italian painter

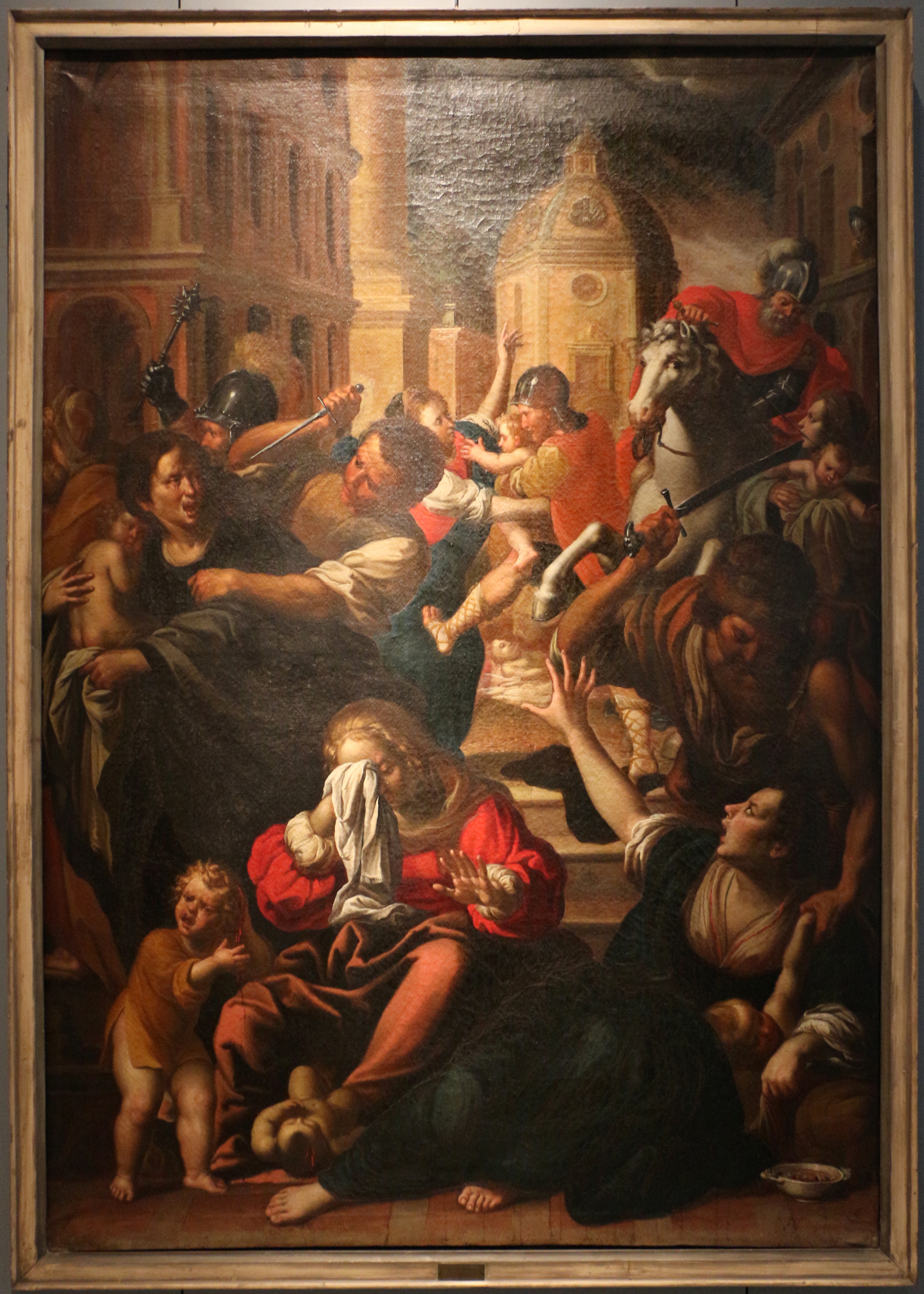
The Massacre of the Innocents

Giovanni Battista Tortiroli (1621-1651) was an Italian painter of the Baroque period.

He was born in Cremona. He was a pupil of the Mannerist painter, Andrea Mainardi, but them moved to worked both in Rome and in Naples, and there altering his style. He died at the age of thirty. A pupil of Tortiroli was Giovanni Battista Lazzaroni.
