= Luca Cattapani =

Italian painter

Luca Cattapani was an Italian painter of the late-Renaissance period, active in his native Cremona. He was born about the year 1570, and was a pupil of one of the Campi. He painted a Decollation of St. John for the church of San Donato at Cremona.

== Sources ==
- Bryan, Michael (1886). Robert Edmund Graves (ed.). Dictionary of Painters and Engravers, Biographical and Critical. Vol. I: A-K. London: George Bell and Sons. p. 252.
