= Loggia dei Militi =

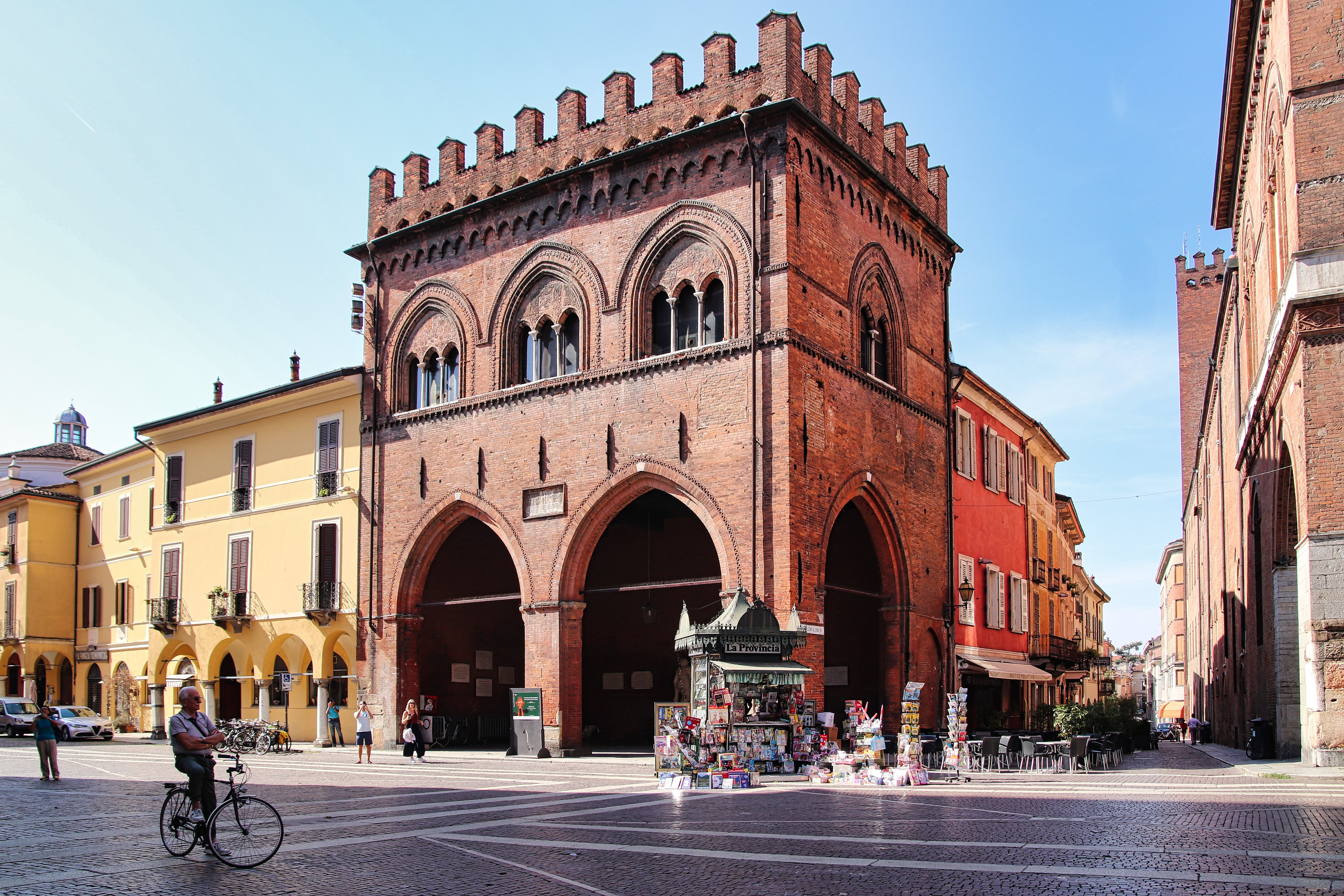
- Main façade of the Loggia dei Militi
- Interactive map of the Loggia dei Militi area

General information
- Location: Cremona, Italy, Italy
- Coordinates: 45°7′59.33″N 10°1′28.58″E
- Inaugurated: 1292

The Loggia dei Militi (Italian: "Soldiers' Loggia") is a historical building in Cremona, northern Italy. As reported by an inscription on its façade, it was built in 1292.

On the façade is reported the blazon (Gonfalone) of the City of Cremona: four lions that respectively represent the four city gates: Ariberta, Pertusia, San Lorenzo and Natali.

The Loggia was the seat of assemblies for the local "Società dei Militi". It is constituted by two rectangular rooms. Under the portico is the coat of arms of Cremona, composed by two Ercoli that held the main blazon of the city (According to the legend, Ercole was the founder of Cremona). The coat of arms was moved here from the Margherita Gate when the latter was demolished in 1910.
