= Traditional violin craftsmanship in Cremona =

Intangible cultural heritage

- UNESCO Intangible Cultural Heritage
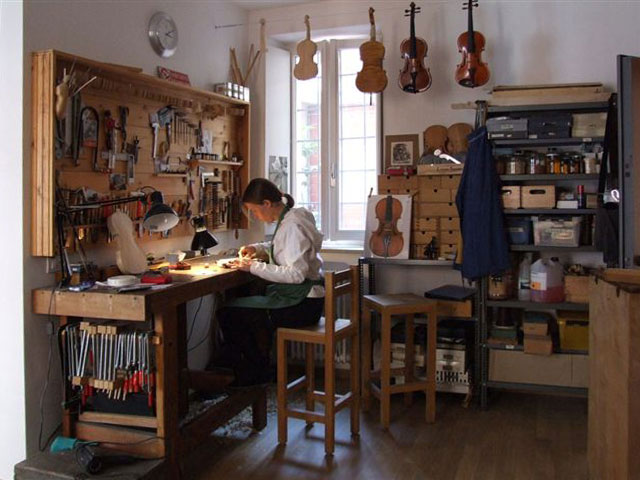
- A luthier workshop in Cremona
- Country: Italy
- Reference: 00719
- Region: Europe and North America

Inscription history
- Inscription: 2012 (7th session)
- List: Representative

Traditional violin craftsmanship in Cremona (Italian: Saperi e saper fare liutario della tradizione cremonese) was declared a intangible cultural heritage by UNESCO in 2012, during the 7th session of the Intergovernmental Committee in Paris. The Cremona's traditional violin making is an ancient form of handicraft typical of Cremona, where bowed string instruments like violins, violas, cellos and double basses have been made since the 16th century.

== Technique ==
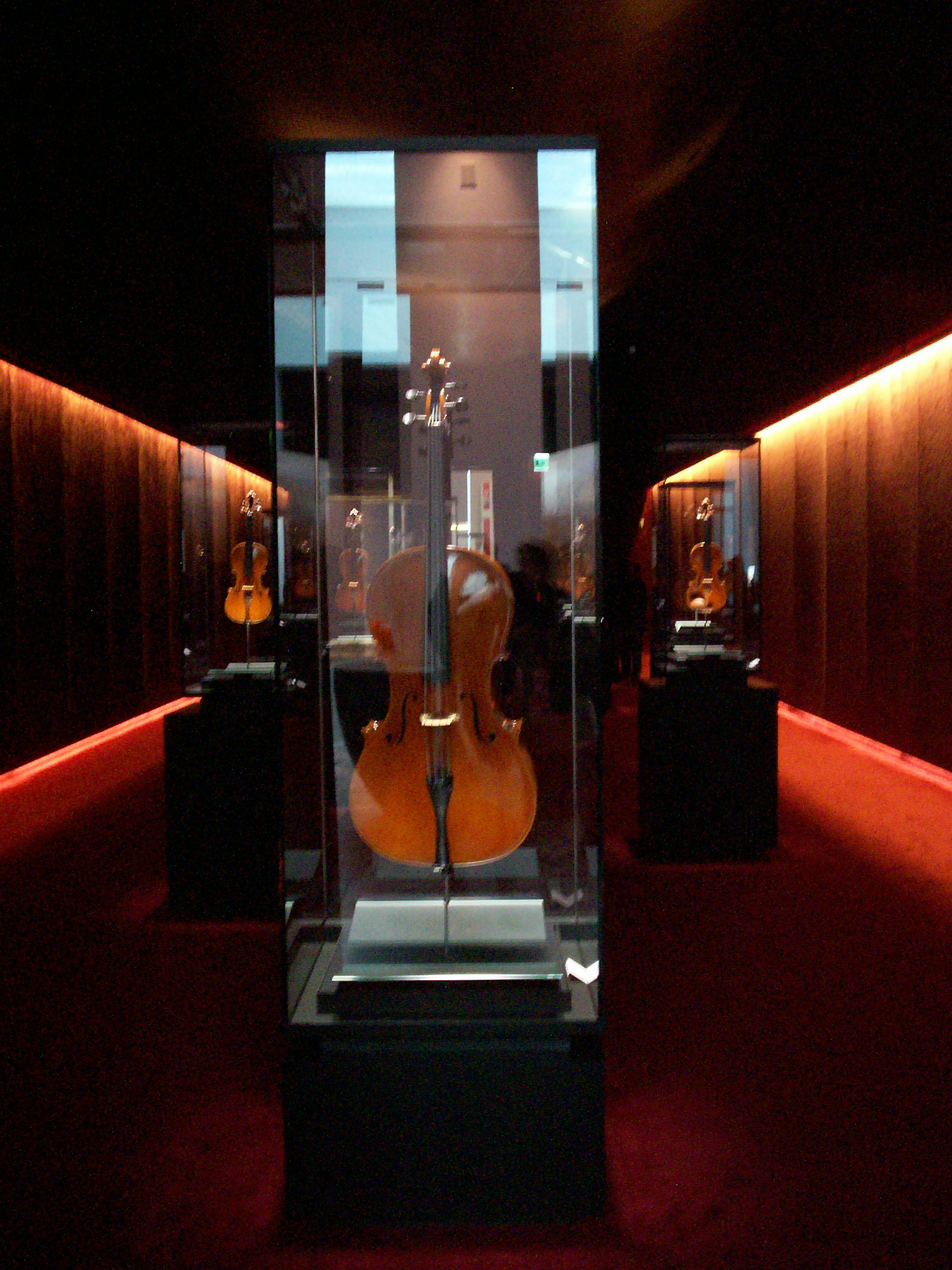
The "treasure box" at the Violin Museum in Cremona

Techniques developed by luthiers in Cremona for making stringed instruments hold unique importance in the world of music. Cremonese luthiers standardized the violin family of instruments, and Cremonese violinmaking techniques are still considered by many to be the best in the world.

Each instrument is handmade and assembled with more than seventy different molded pieces of wood. Every part of a new violin requires a particular technique, continuously adapted according to the different acoustic response of each piece of wood: for this reason, it is impossible to get two violins exactly identical. Every part of the violin should be made with a particular kind of wood, carefully selected and naturally seasoned. The care required for each process, as well as the unique qualities of each piece of wood make industrialization impossible .

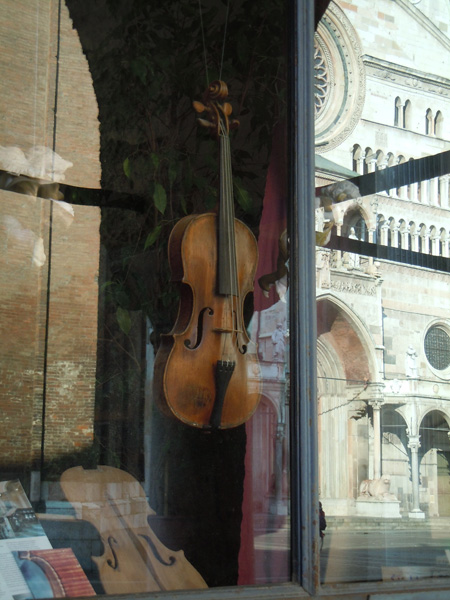
A violin maker shop in Cremona

A traditional Cremonese luthier used no industrial or semi-industrial parts, and the violin is carefully varnished by hand, never sprayed. Many of the elements of the musical instrument appear to be ornamental, but serve an invisible purpose (often to either enhance projection, tone, or to protect against potential damage.

The violin construction process is personally followed by the violin maker in every phase, from the tree to the finished instrument: for this reason a Cremona's violin maker can make only three to six violins per year.

A traditional violinmaker must have in-depth knowledge of the natural materials used, as well as the techniques passed down from generation to generation through words, gestures and habits shared since the 16th century, when the Cremona's violin making became popular, thanks to the skills of the house of Amati, then improved and refined by Stradivari, Guarneri, Francesco Rugeri, Vincenzo Rugeri, and Bergonzi.

== Protection ==
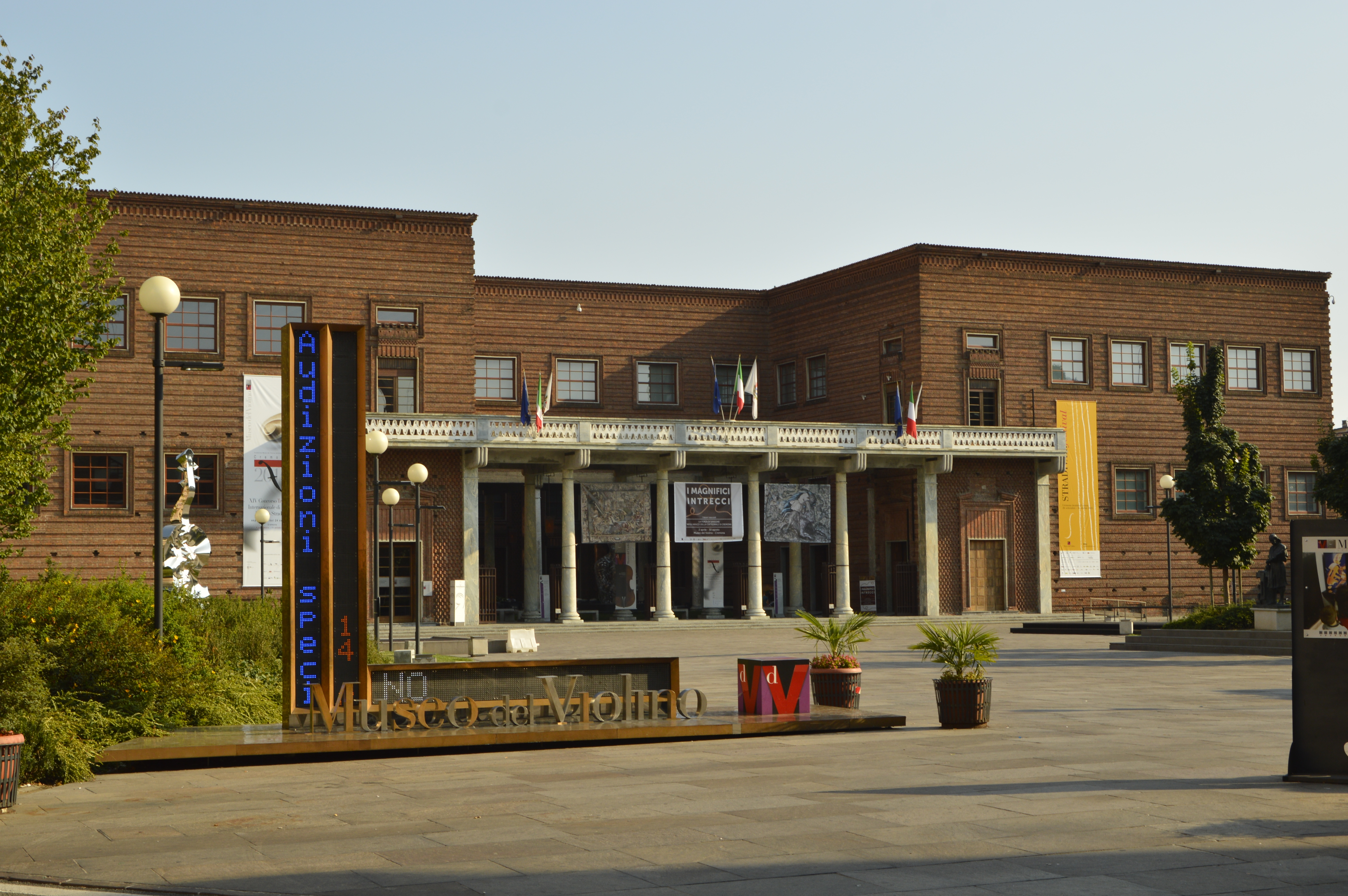
Violin Museum

The ancient tradition of Cremona's violin making is protected by two supervisory bodies: the Stradivari Violin Makers Consortium and the Violin Making Italian Association, which represents more than 140 craftsmen. In addition, the Cremona International Violin Making School was founded in Cremona on 12 September 1938.

After the UNESCO recognition, it was opened in 2013 the new Violin Museum at the Palazzo dell'Arte in Cremona, full renovated and with a new auditorium to listen music played with old and new instruments made in Cremona.

== See also ==
- Cremona
- Museo del violino
- Cremona International Violin Making School
- Antonio Stradivari
- Giuseppe Guarneri
- Francesco Rugeri
- Vincenzo Rugeri
- Nicolo Amati
- 1937 National Violin Making Exhibition and Competition in Cremona
