= Prospero Ricca =

Italian painter (1838–1895)

- Born: 6 March 1838; Saluzzo
- Died: 1895 (aged 56–57); Cuneo

Prospero Ricca (1838–1895) was an Italian painter, mainly of snowy landscapes. He was also a lawyer.

He was born on 6 March 1838 in Saluzzo in the Piedmont region, where he resided for most of his life. He studied at the Accademia Albertina of Fine Arts in Turin. In 1872 at Milan he exhibited Palude; in 1877 at Naples, Dintorni of Turin and Paesaggio; in 1880 at Turin, Il lago d'Arignano ed i suoi castellani a caccia; at the 1881 Mostra of Venice, he displayed Nevicata: in 1883 at Rome, Grappoli d'uva; and the next year in Saluzzo La vedovella (Nevicata) and Presso Alpignano. Other paintings of this artist are: Povero parroco (Nevicata); Inverno; exhibited in 1887 at Venice, Nevicata; exhibited in 1888 at Bologna, Convento in Liguria. He died in 1895 in Cuneo. His younger brother, Pietro Ricca was also a landscape painter.
