= Museo del Violino =

Museum in Cremona, Italy

Violin Museum
- Italian: Museo del Violino
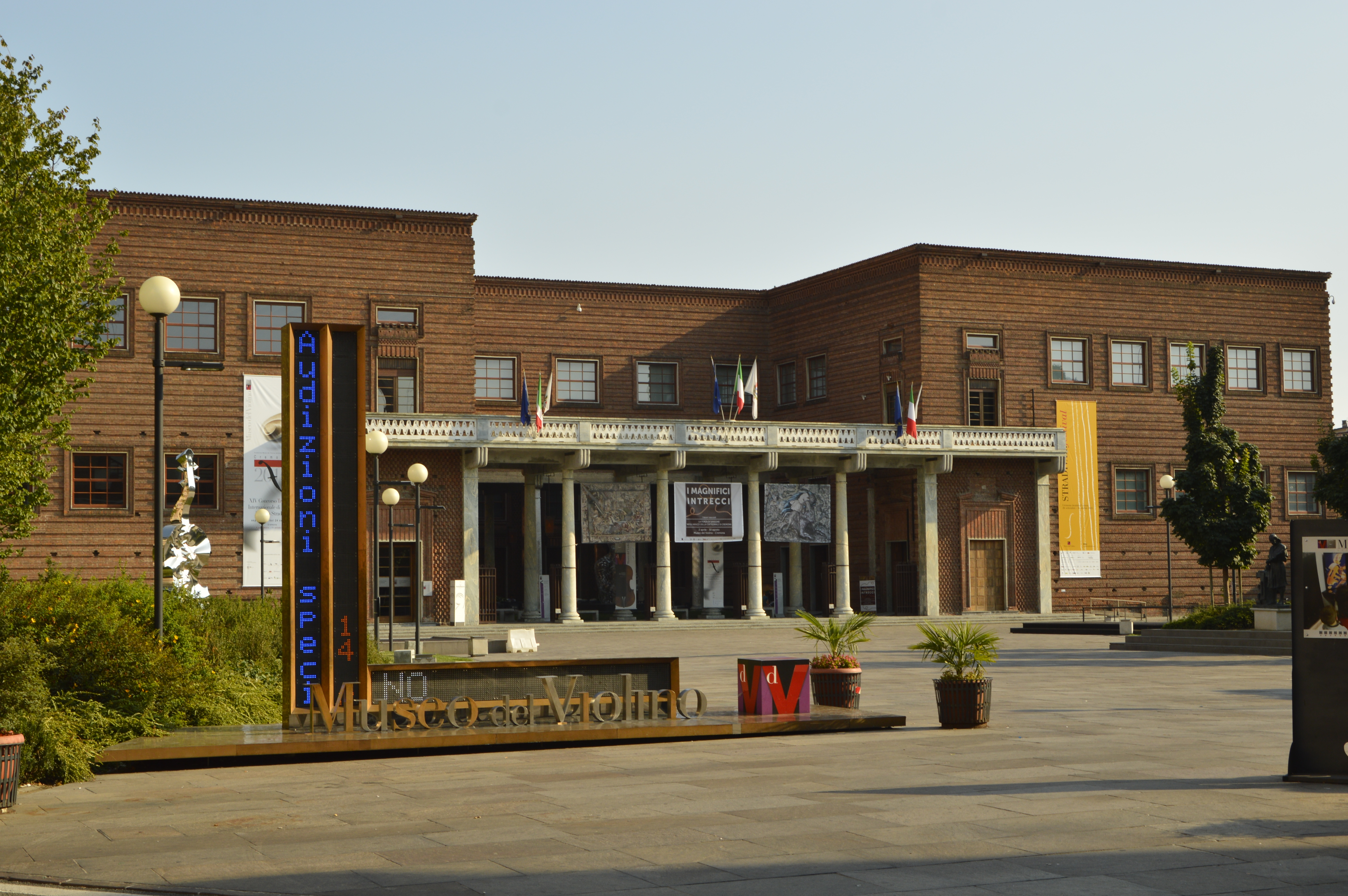
- Exterior of the Museo del Violino in Cremona, Italy

- Location of Museo del Violino in Cremona on the map of Italy
- Former name: Stradivarius Museum
- Established: 1893; 133 years ago
- Location: Piazza Guglielmo Marconi, Cremona, Italy
- Coordinates: 45.1315399°N 10.0231361°E
- Type: Musical instrument museum
- Director: Virginia Villa
- Owner: Fondazione Stradivari
- Website: www.museodelviolino.org/en/

The Violin Museum (Italian: Museo del Violino), formerly the Stradivarius Museum (Italian: Museo Stradivari), is a musical instrument museum located in Cremona. The museum is best known for its collection of stringed instruments that includes violins, violas, cellos, and double basses crafted by renowned luthiers, including Antonio Stradivari and Giuseppe Guarneri del Gesù.

== History ==
At the time of his death in 1883, Enrico Ceruti, a prolific and successful Italian luthier and musician in his own right, passed down the objects from his workshop to Michelina, the widow of his son, Paolo. Michelina was at that time, married the second time to Giovanni Battista Cerani, who was also a close friend of Enrico Ceruti. Cerani was an instrument dealer and collector, who later donated various musical instruments and models owned by great Cremonese violin luthiers, including Antonio Stradivari to the town of Cremona in 1893, and thus, the Stradivarius Museum (Italian: Museo Stradivari) was established. The museum was later enriched by the inestimable collection of Count Ignazio Alessandro Cozio of Salabue, an Italian count who is known as the first great connoisseur and collector of violins of his time. Cozio's meticulous notes on nearly every instrument that passed through his hands contributed enormously to the body of knowledge surrounding Italian violinmaking.

In 1920, a huge collection of original Stradivari family tools, such as wooden models, documents, and artisanal equipment for the creation of stringed instruments were purchased from the count's descendants by the violin maker Giuseppe Fiorini of Bologna in order to create an Italian school of lutherie. However, after failing to do so for ten years, he decided to donate the whole collection to the Town Hall of Cremona in 1930.

The municipal administration of Cremona later created the "Stradivarian Room" (Italian: Sala Stradivariana) inside the Palazzo Affaitati, where all the objects of the Salabue-Fiorini collection were exhibited. After a brief transfer of the exhibits to the Palazzo dell'Arte and to the state archives, they were later placed in the Stradivarius Museum, which was divided into three rooms: the first illustrated the construction of the contralto viola according to the classic Cremonese school; the second room exhibited some instruments made by Italian violin makers of the 19th and 20th century; the last room contained sixteen exhibits with over 700 objects.

The "Cremonese traditional violin craftmanship" (Italian: Saperi e saper fare liutario della tradizione cremonese) was declared an intangible cultural heritage by UNESCO on 5 December 2012, during the 7th session of the Intergovernmental Committee in Paris.

After two years of restoration of the Palazzo dell'Arte, the entire collection has been permanently transferred to the current building of the Violin Museum which was officially inaugurated on 14 September 2013.

In 2019, the podcast This is Love visited the Museo del violino for their episode, "The Town That Stayed Quiet."

== Exhibits ==
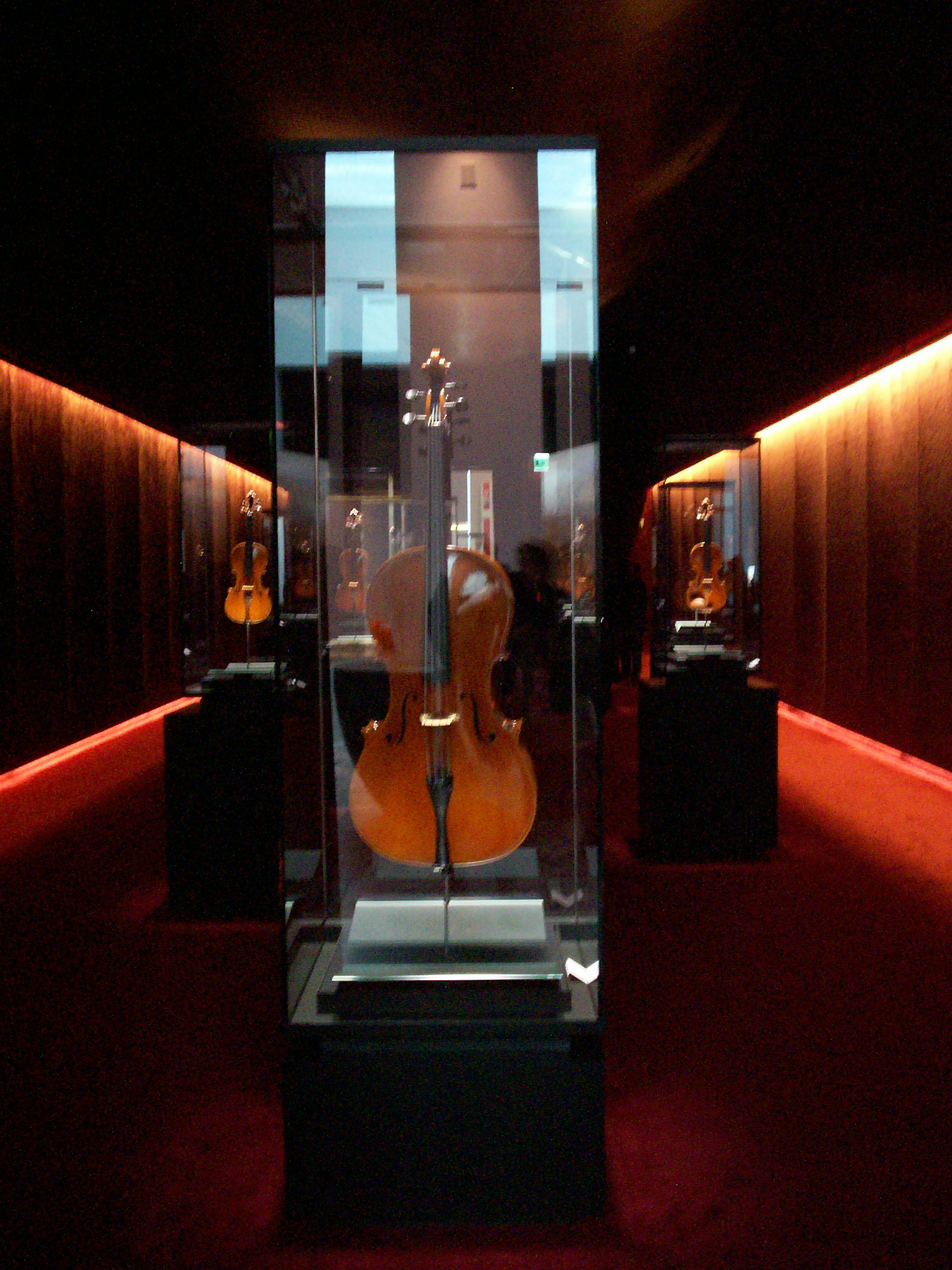
The Treasure Box (Room 5)

The collections in the violin museum are organized into ten rooms:

- Room 1: The origins of the violin – The exhibits in this room explain how and when did the violin came about, as well as showing the instruments that preceded it. The phases leading to the birth of the violin are presented including its spread over northern Italy and into the most important European courts, in particular France, at the time of Catherine de' Medici;
- Room 2: The luthier's workshop – The room presents the violin-making process, and introduces the parts of the violin, and the materials, tools, and techniques used during the violin making process;
- Room 3: The spread of the violin – A room that explains the spread of modern violins into Europe and the rest of the world throughout the 16th to 20th century. Excerpts from important concerts performed by famous 20th-century violinists can be seen and heard in the listening room;
- Room 4: Classical Cremonese violinmaking – The room introduces visitors to the history of Cremonese violinmaking industry and the works of the famous luthier families from Cremona;
- Room 5: The treasure chest – This room houses the most important instruments donated to the Town Hall of Cremona, which includes instruments crafted by Antonio Stradivari, and by various members of the Amati and Guarneri families;
- Room 6: Stradivarian tools – More than 700 exhibits, from drawings, mounds and tools, passed down to the museum from Antonio Stradivari's workshop are on display in this room. Most exhibits were donated to the Town Hall of Cremona in 1930 by the famous Italian luthier, Giuseppe Fiorini.
- Room 7: Cremona 1937. The National Violinmaking Competition – Organized to commemorate the 200th anniversary of the death of Antonio Stradivari and to revive modern Italian violinmaking in the spirit of Stradivari, Amati, and Guarneri, the 1937 National Violin Making Exhibition and Competition in Cremona received entries from 119 Italian luthiers. The prizewinning violins, violas, cellos, and double basses from 1937 are on exhibit in this room;
- Room 8: The Triennial violin making competitions – Since 1976, a triennial international competition held in Cremona, now organized by the Fondazione Stradivari (The Stradivarian Foundation), has awarded prizes to the best modern instruments selected by a jury composed of luthiers and musicians. The permanent collection of contemporary violinmaking brings together in this room the winning violins, violas, cellos, and double basses from the last 13 competitions;
- Room 9: Friends of Stradivari – dedicated to temporary exhibitions of instruments from other collectors and museums; and
- Room 10: The violin in the cinema – This is where film clips about Cremonese violin makers are shown.

== Other attractions ==
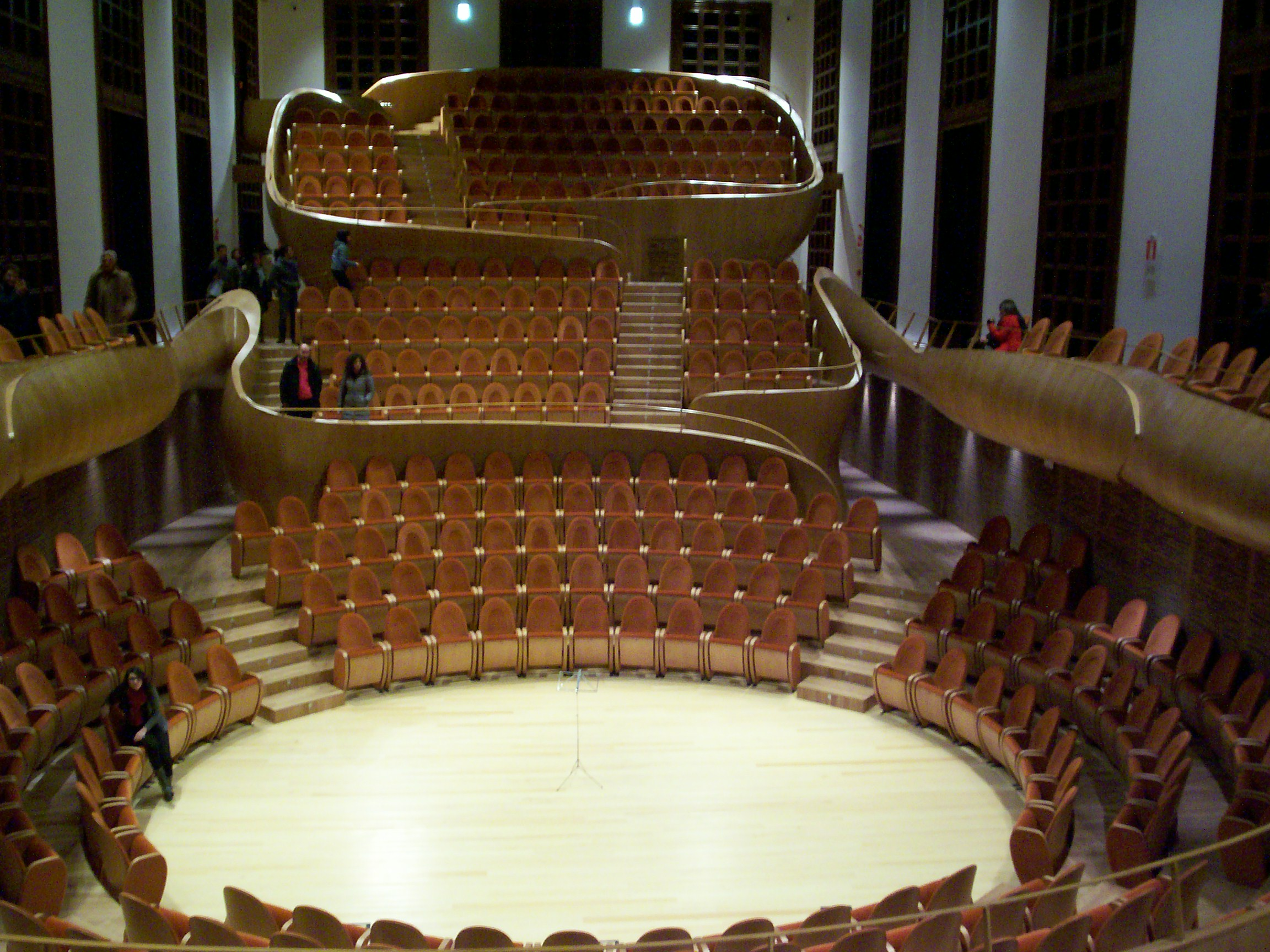
The Giovanni Arvedi Auditorium

At the back of the museum, in what was originally the assembly hall of the Palazzo dell'Arte, a 464-seat auditorium named after the entrepreneur, Giovanni Arvedi, was designed and built by architects Giorgio Palù, Michele Bianchi, and the acoustical engineer Yasuhisa Toyota. Soloists and chamber orchestras perform on a small elliptical stage with an area of 85 m^{2}, located in the middle of the room.

In addition, two scientific research laboratories were set up by the Polytechnic of Milan and the University of Pavia, for the scientific study of violin-making and diagnostic research.

Outside the museum is the modern sculpture named L'anima della musica ("The soul of music"), created by Catalan artist Jaume Plensa, depicting a 4-meter-tall half-body of a man covered in musical notes.

== See also ==
- List of music museums
- Count Ignazio Alessandro Cozio di Salabue
- Traditional violin craftsmanship in Cremona
