= Marcelino =

Marcelino is a surname that originated in Spain. There are also several families with the Marcelino surname in Philippines, Portugal, and the Americas (North, Central, and South).

- Carolina Marcelino (born 1984), Brazilian researcher and computer scientist
- Fábio Marcelino (1973–2025), Brazilian volleyball player
- Flor Marcelino (born 1951), Politician born in Manila, Philippines
- Jaycee Marcelino (born 1995), Filipino basketball player
- Malaya Marcelino, Canadian politician

Marcelino is also a first name given in Spanish and Portuguese:

- Marcelino Bernal (born 1962), Mexican association footballer (var. Mexican clubs)
- Marcelino Bolivar (born 1964), Venezuelan boxer
- Marcelino Ulibarri Eguilaz (1880–1951), Spanish politician and civil servant
- Marcelino Elena (born 1971), Spanish association footballer (Gijón, Mallorca)
- Marcelino Oreja Elósegui (1894–1934), Spanish entrepreneur, Catholic activist and Carlist politician
- Marcelino Freire (born 1967), Brazilian writer and cultural producer
- Marcelino de Oraá Lecumberri (1788–1851), Basque Spanish military man and administrator
- Marcelino Libanan (born 1963), Filipino politician
- Marcelino López (1943–2001), Cuban American baseball pitcher
- Marcelino Menéndez y Pelayo (1856–1912), Spanish scholar, historian
- Marcelino Martínez (born 1940), Spanish association footballer (Zaragoza)
- Marcelino McCrary-Ball (born 1999), American football player
- Marcelino Paz do Nascimento (1939–2002), Brazilian footballer
- Marcelino Núñez (born 2000), Chilean professional footballer
- Marcelino dos Santos (1929–2020), Mozambican poet, revolutionary and vice president
- Marcelino Teodoro (born 1970), Filipino politician
- Marcelino García Toral (born 1965), Spanish association footballer and manager

== See also ==
- San Marcelino, Zambales, a 1st class municipality in the province of Zambales, Philippines
- Miracle of Marcelino, a 1955 Spanish film
- Marcelino Pan y Vino (TV series), a 2000 television animated series
