= Giovanni Pallavera =

Italian painter (1818-1886)

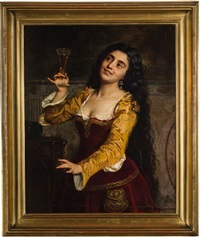
Gypsy woman toasting with a glass in her hand

Giovanni Pallavera (1818–1886) was an Italian painter, mainly known for his genre subjects in period costume.

He was born and resided in Cremona. He began exhibiting in Milan as a student as early as 1847, and in the early 1850s depicted some subjects from history or literary subjects. In 1870, he displayed La famiglia di buon cuore. At Milan, in 1872, he exhibited: Gli ultimi tocchi, depicting a 16th-century painter in action; La Ritrosia di una modella; Lucia ringrazia l'Innominato; L'amore alla lettura; in 1881 to Milan, he sent Passeggiate sentimentali; Colla Nonna. At an 1883 contest in Milan, he sent: Contadinella con giovenca; Briansuola mezza figura; Costume Campagna Romana; and Paese; in 1883 to Rome, he sent Le Carezze alla mamma and La lezione di calze.

He also painted some sacred subjects such as his paintings in the Quadreria dell’Ospedale Maggiore and for the Istituto dei Ciechi.

He died in Milan.
