= Santi Marcellino e Pietro =

Santi Marcellino e Pietro may refer to:

- Santi Marcellino e Pietro al Laterano: Catholic church in Rome, a titular church
- Marcellinus and Peter: 4th century Christian martyrs in the city of Rome
