= Marcelin =

Marcelin may refer to:

== Places ==
- Marcelin, part of the Grunwald district of Poznań
- Marcelin, Łódź Voivodeship (central Poland)
- Marcelin, Masovian Voivodeship (east-central Poland)
- Marcelin, Saskatchewan, Canada
- Marcelin, West Pomeranian Voivodeship (north-west Poland)
- Marcelin, Saint-Louis-du-Sud, Haiti, a village in the Aquin arrondissement of Haiti.

== Other ==
- James Marcelin (born 1986), Haitian footballer
- Jasmine R. Marcelin, Caribbean-American physician
