= Stefania Lazzaroni =

Italian long jumper

Personal information
- National team: Italy: 4 caps (1984)
- Born: 10 July 1965 (age 60) Bergamo, Italy

Sport
- Sport: Athletics
- Event: Long jump
- Club: Atletica Bergamo 1959
- Retired: 1988

Achievements and titles
- Personal bests: Long jump: 6.26 m (1984); Long jump indoor: 6.27 m (1984)
Medal record
European Indoor Championships
| Bronze medal – third place | 1984 Gothenburg | Long jump |

Stefania Lazzaroni (born 10 July 1965) is a former Italian long jumper who was bronze medalist at the 1984 European Indoor Championships.

== Career ==
Meteor of Italian athletics, she competed at a senior level for only four seasons from 1984 (18 years) to 1988 (22 years). Her golden year was certainly 1984, when, in addition to winning the Italian indoor championship with a personal best of 6.27 m, which was also a national record, she also won bronze medal at the European Championships in Gothenburg at the age of 18 and 237 days. and with this result he is the youngest Italian athlete ever successful in this feat.

== National records ==
- Long jump indoor: 6.27 m ( (Italy) Turin, 23 February 1984) - record holder until 3 February 1985.

== Achievements ==
| Year | Competition | Venue | Rank | Event | Time | Notes |
|---|---|---|---|---|---|---|
| 1984 | European Indoor Championships | (Sweden) Gothenburg | 3rd | Long jump | 6.08 m | |

== National titles ==
Lazzaroni won a national championship at individual senior level.

- Italian Athletics Indoor Championships
  - Long jump: 1984
