= Manolo Guindani =

Italian footballer and manager

Manolo Guindani (born 12 January 1971) is an Italian manager and retired footballer. He played as a midfielder. In 1993–94 season he played for Cremonese in Serie A. He then played in Serie B, Serie C1 and Serie C2.

After his retirement he began a new career as a coach and managed Palazzolo, Este, Castellana and Fanfulla.

== Career as a player ==
1989–1990 Orceana 2 (0)
1990–1991 Pergocrema 19 (0)
1991–1992 Cremonese 0 (0)
1992–1993 → Vastese 31 (1)
1993–1994 Cremonese 2 (0)
1994–1995 Novara 25 (0)
1995–1996 Palazzolo 13 (2)
1996–1997 Pavia 29 (0)
1997–1999 Fidenza 56 (3)
1999–2000 Casale 6 (0)
2000 Pizzighettone 19 (1)
2000-2001 Crociati Noceto 27 (2)
2001–2002 Mezzolara 26 (0)
2002–2004 Chiari 58 (5)
2004–2005 Castellana 25 (3)

== Career as a manager ==
2005–2006 Palazzolo
2006–2007 Este
2007–2008 Castellana
2008– Fanfulla

== See also ==
- Football in Italy
- List of football clubs in Italy
