= Marcelli =

Marcelli is an Italian surname. Notable people with the surname include:

- Abbondio Marcelli (1932–2015), Italian rower
- Kyle Marcelli, (born 1990), Canadian racing driver
- Nino Marcelli (1890–1967), Italian composer and conductor
- Nino Marcelli (born 2005), Slovak footballer
- Ulderico Marcelli (1882–1962), Italian composer and musician
- Vittorio Marcelli (born 1944), former Italian road cyclist

== See also ==
- Giru Marcelli, a city and bishopric in Roman North Africa
- Category:Claudii Marcelli, members of the ancient Roman gens Claudius from the branch of Marcellus
