= Pietro Ricca =

Italian painter

Pietro Ricca (Saluzzo, 6 March 1838 - ) was an Italian painter, mainly of landscapes.

== Biography ==
Like his brother, he studied law and graduated in 1862, but also like his younger brother, Pietro Ricca, he became a landscape painter in Turin. Among his masterworks are: Le vicinanze of Turin, sent to the 1877 National Exposition of Naples; I dintorni di Bussoleno, exhibited in 1873 at Milan; Una nevicata, exhibited in Melbourne, Australia. His painting Il medico condotto was awarded a silver medal at the Exposition held in Ferrara to celebrate the four hundredth anniversary of the birth of Ariosto.
