= Sant'Agata, Cremona =

Church building in Cremona, Italy

The Church of Sant'Agata is one of the oldest churches in the city of Cremona, Italy. It was originally attached to the Augustinian monastic order of Canons Regular of the Lateran. The abbot of the attached monastery was, like the bishop, mitred.

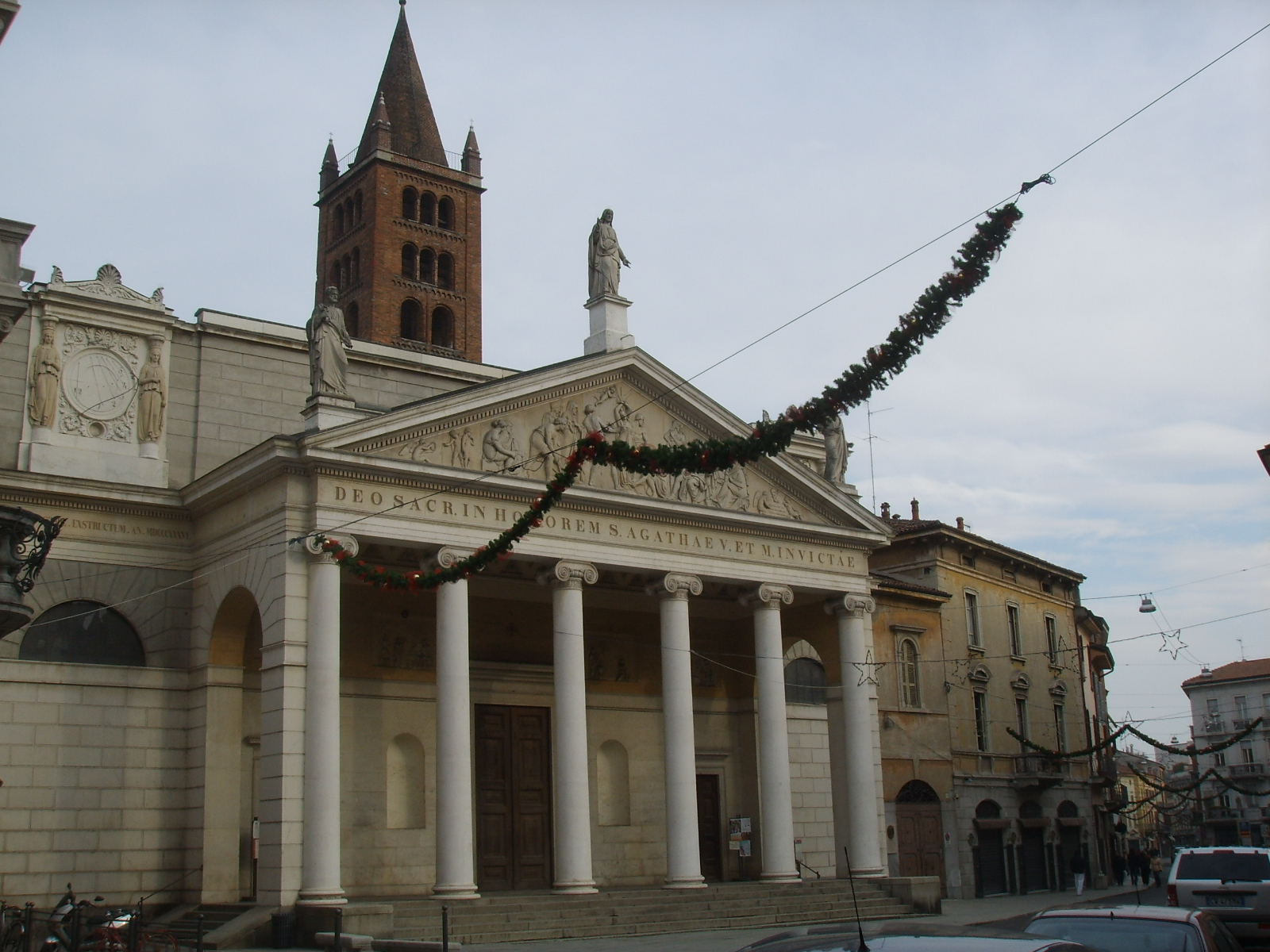
The Church of Sant'Agata, Cremona.

== History ==
The original church at the site was built in 1077, and first rebuilt in the 12th century. Of this latter Romanesque church, only the bell-tower remains.

The interior of the church was again rebuilt in 1496 under the designs of Bernardino de Lera; while the present Neoclassical-style facade with simple portico of white columns was built in 1835 under designs of Luigi Voghera. Nearly all the 15th-century fresco decoration was lost. The nave was frescoed with an Allegory of Virtue in 1872. Fragments of the earlier decoration are conserved: A Grieving Madonna in the right nave, a Christ at the Column in the left nave. The left nave contains the Trecchi Mausoleum (1502) by Gian Cristoforo Romano. The third altarpiece on the left, depicts Saint Agatha. In the chapel of Saint Agatha is a Pietà, by Bernardino Gatti. The walls of the presbytery were frescoed with scenes from the Life of Saint Agatha (1537) by Giulio Campi. In a chapel of the left nave, is an altarpiece depicting the Holy Family with Mary Magdalen (1518) by Boccaccio Boccaccino.
