= Cremona =

Cremona Cremùna (Lombard)
- Comune
- Comune di Cremona
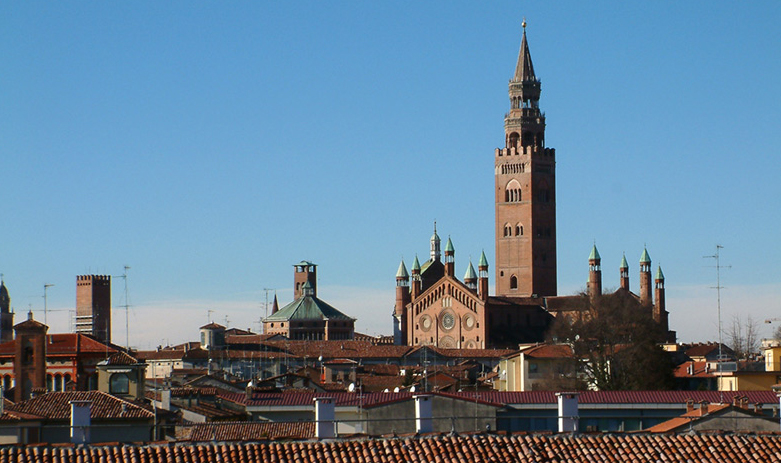
- Panorama of Cremona

- Flag Coat of arms

- Location within Italy Location within Lombardy
- Coordinates: 45°08′00″N 10°01′29″E
- Country: Italy
- Region: Lombardy
- Province: Cremona (CR)

Government
  - Mayor: Andrea Virgilio (PD)

Area
  - Total: 69.7 km^{2} (26.9 sq mi)
- Elevation: 47 m (154 ft)

Population (1 January 2021)
  - Total: 71,223
  - Density: 1,020/km^{2} (2,650/sq mi)
- Demonym: Cremonesi
- Time zone: UTC+1 (CET)
  - Summer (DST): UTC+2 (CEST)
- Postal code: 26100
- Dialing code: 0372
- ISTAT code: 019036
- Patron saint: St. Homobonus
- Saint day: 13 November
- Website: Official website

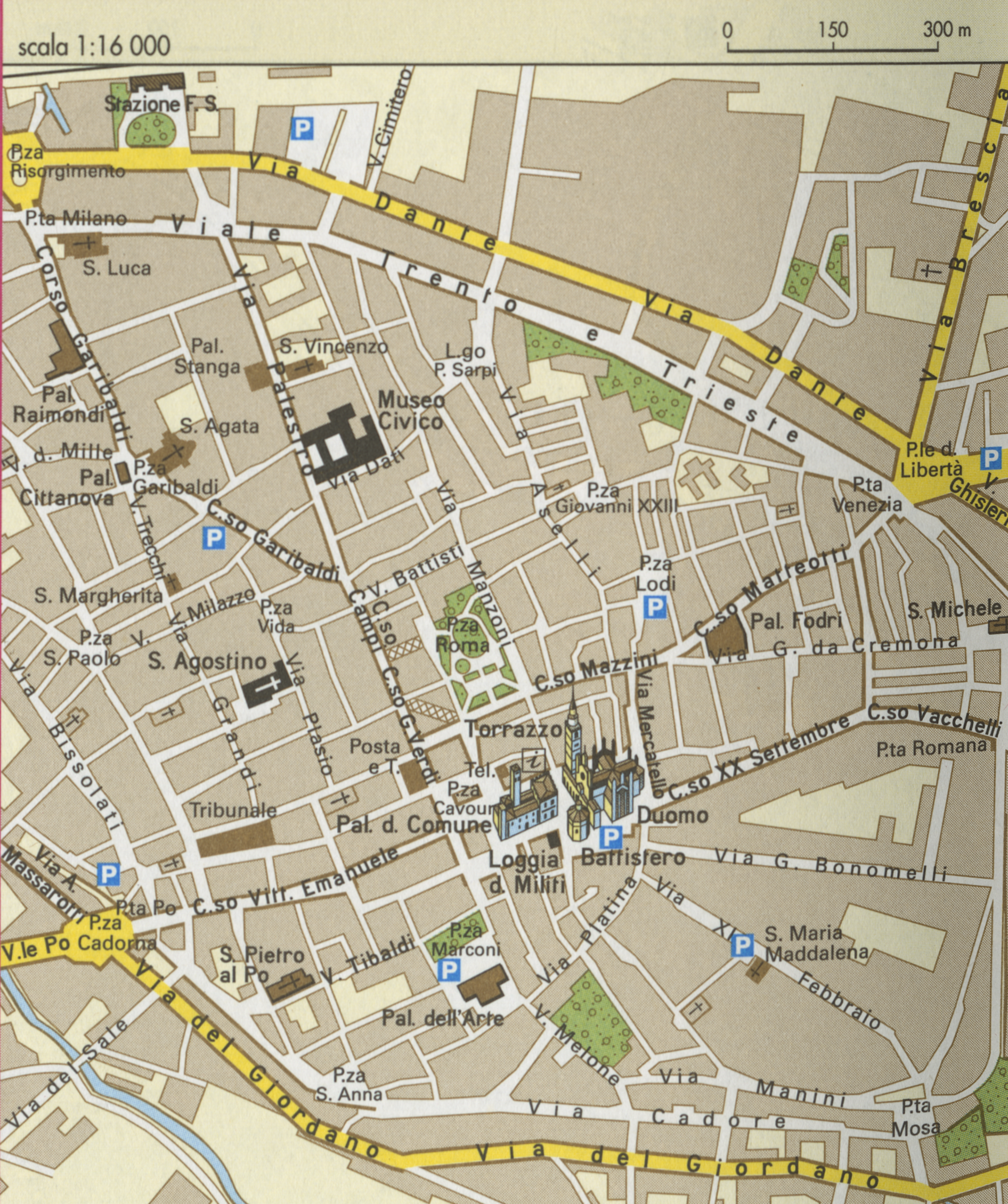
Map of city centre

Cremona (/krɪˈmoʊnə/ krim-OH-nə, UK also /krɛˈ-/ krem-, Italian: [kreˈmoːna]; Cremunés: Cremùna; Emilian: Carmona) is a city and comune (municipality) in northern Italy, situated in Lombardy, on the left bank of the Po river in the middle of the Po Valley. It is the capital of the province of Cremona and the seat of the local city and province governments. The city of Cremona is especially noted for its musical history and traditions, including some of the earliest and most renowned luthiers, such as Giuseppe Guarneri, Antonio Stradivari, Francesco Rugeri, Vincenzo Rugeri, and several members of the Amati family.

== History ==
=== Ancient ===
==== Celtic origin ====
Cremona is first mentioned in history as a settlement of the Cenomani, a Gallic (Celtic) tribe that arrived in the Po valley around 400 BC. However, the name Cremona most likely dates back to earlier settlers and puzzled the ancients, who gave many fanciful interpretations.

==== Roman military outpost ====
In 218 BC, the Romans established on that spot their first military outpost (a colonia) north of the Po river, and kept the old name. Cremona and nearby Placentia (modern Piacenza, on the south bank of the Po) were founded in the same year, as bases for penetration into what became the Roman Province of Gallia Cisalpina (Cisalpine Gaul). Due to the trade importance of the town, from it started the Via Brixiana a Roman road which connected Brixia (Brescia) to Cremona.

Cremona quickly grew into one of the largest towns in northern Italy, as it was on the main road connecting Genoa to Aquileia, the Via Postumia. It supplied troops to Julius Caesar and benefited from his rule, but later supported Marcus Junius Brutus and the Senate in their conflict with Augustus, who, having won, in 40 BC confiscated Cremona's land and redistributed it to his men. The famous poet Virgil, who went to school in Cremona, had to forfeit his ancestral farm ("too close to wretched Cremona"), but later regained it.

==== Destruction ====
The city's prosperity continued to increase until 69 AD, when it was sacked and destroyed in the Second Battle of Bedriacum by the troops of Vespasian under command of Marcus Antonius Primus, fighting to install him as Emperor against his rival Vitellius. The sacking was described by Tacitus in his Histories.

Cremona was rebuilt with the help of the new emperor Vespasian, but it seems to have failed to regain its former prosperity as it disappeared from history.

==== Re-emergence ====
In the 6th century, it resurfaced as a military outpost of the Eastern Roman (Byzantine) Empire during the Gothic War.

=== Early Middle Ages ===
When the Lombards invaded much of Italy in the second half of the 6th century AD, Cremona remained a Byzantine stronghold as part of the Exarchate of Ravenna. The city expanded towards the north-west, with the creation of a great trenched camp outside the walls.

==== Lombard Possession ====
In 603 AD, Cremona was conquered by the Lombard King Agilulf and again destroyed. Its territory was divided between the two duchies of Brescia and Bergamo.

However, in 615 AD, Queen Theodelinda, a devout Roman Catholic intent on converting her people, had Cremona rebuilt and re-installed a bishop there.

==== Holy Roman Vassal ====
Control of the city fell increasingly to its bishop, who became a Holy Roman Empire vassal after Charlemagne's conquest of Italy. In this way, Cremona increased its power and its prosperity steadily and some of its bishops had important roles between the 10th and 11th centuries. Bishop Liutprand of Cremona was a member of the Imperial court under the Saxony dynasty and Olderic gained strong privileges for his city from emperor Otto III. Its economy was boosted by the creation of a river port out of the former Byzantine fortress.

However, the two bishops Lambert and Ubaldo created discord with the city's people. Emperor Conrad II settled the quarrel by entering Cremona in 1037 together with the young Pope Benedict IX.

City coat of arms of Cremona on the town hall

=== Medieval Commune ===
Under Henry IV, Cremona refused to pay the oppressive taxes requested by the Empire and the bishop. According to a legend, the great gonfaloniere (mayor) Giovanni Baldesio of Cremona faced the emperor himself in a duel. As Henry was knocked from his horse, the city was saved the annual payment of the 3 kg (7 lb) golden ball, which, for that year, was instead given to Berta, Giovanni's girlfriend, as her dowry.

==== Anti-Empire ====
The first historical news about a free Cremona is from 1093, as it entered into an anti-Empire alliance led by Mathilde of Canossa, together with Lodi, Milan and Piacenza. The conflict ended with Cremona gaining the Insula Fulcheria, the area around the nearby city of Crema, as its territory.

After that time, the new commune warred against nearby cities to enlarge its territory. In 1107 Cremona conquered Tortona, but four years later its army was defeated near Bressanoro.

As in many northern Italian cities, the people were divided into two opposing parties, the Guelphs, who were stronger in the new city, and the Ghibellines, who had their base in the old city. The parties were so irreconcilable that the former built a second Communal Palace, the still existing Palazzo Cittanova ("new city's palace").

==== Pro-Empire ====
When Frederick Barbarossa descended into Italy to assert his authority, Cremona sided with him in order to gain his support against Crema, which had rebelled with the help of Milan. The subsequent victory and its loyal imperial stance earned Cremona the right to create a mint for its own coinage in 1154. In 1162, Imperial and Cremonese forces assaulted Milan and destroyed it.

==== Lombard League ====
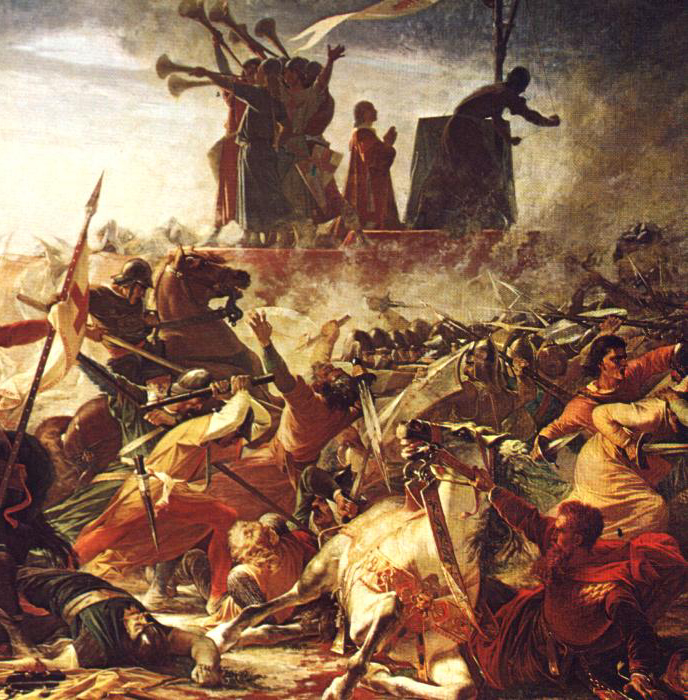
The defence of the Carroccio during the battle of Legnano (1176) by Amos Cassioli (1832–1891)

However, in 1167 the city changed sides and joined the Lombard League. Its troops were part of the army that, on 29 May 1176, defeated Barbarossa in the Battle of Legnano. However, the Lombard League did not survive this victory for long. In 1213, at Castelleone, the Cremonese defeated the League of Milan, Lodi, Crema, Novara, Como and Brescia.

In 1232, Cremona allied itself with Emperor Frederick II, who was again trying to reassert the Empire's authority over Northern Italy. In the Battle of Cortenuova, the Cremonese were on the winning side. Thereafter Frederick often held his court in the city.

In the Battle of Parma, however, the Ghibellines suffered a heavy defeat and up to two thousand Cremonese were made prisoners. Some years later, Cremona took its vengeance by defeating Parma's army. Its army, under the command of Umberto Pallavicino, captured Parma's carroccio and for centuries kept the enemy's trousers hanging from the Cathedral's ceiling as a sign of the rival's humiliation.

In 1301 the troubadour Luchetto Gattilusio was podestà of Cremona. During this period Cremona flourished and reached a population of up to 80,000, larger than the 69,000 of 2001.

=== Seignory Lords ===
In 1266, Pallavicino was expelled from Cremona, and the Ghibelline rule ended after his successor Buoso da Dovara relinquished control to a consortium of citizens. In 1271 the position of Capitano del Popolo ("People's Chieftain") was created.

In 1276 the Signoria passed to marquis Cavalcabò Cavalcabò; in 1305 he was succeeded by his son Guglielmo Cavalcabò, who held power until 1310. During this period many edifices were created or restored including the belfry of the Torrazzo, the Romanesque church of San Francis, the cathedral's transepts and the Loggia dei Militi. Moreover, agriculture was boosted with a new network of canals.

After some foreign invasions (notably that of Emperor Henry VII in 1311), the Cavalcabò lasted until 29 November 1322, when a more powerful family, the Visconti of Galeazzo I, came to prominence that in Cremona was to last for a century and a half. The Visconti's signoria (lordship) was interrupted in 1327 by Ludwig the Bavarian, in 1331 by John of Bohemia, and in 1403 by a short-lived return of the Cavalcabò. On 25 July 1406, captain Cabrino Fondulo killed his employer Ubaldo Cavalcabò along with all the male members of his family, and assumed control over Cremona. However, he was unable to face the task, and ceded the city back to the Visconti for a payment of 40,000 golden florins.

Thus Filippo Maria Visconti made his signoria hereditary. Cremona became part of the Duchy of Milan, following its fate until the unification of Italy. Under the Visconti and later the Sforza, Cremona underwent high cultural and religious development. In 1411 Palazzo Cittanova become the seat of the university of fustian merchants.

In 1441 the city hosted the marriage of Francesco I Sforza and Bianca Maria Visconti in the temple built by the Benedictines, which today is the church of Saint Sigismund. Local legend credits the festivities for the occasion of the creation of the city's famous nougat (torrone), although this is apparently a 20th-century fabrication. Ludovico il Moro assisted in the financing of several building projects for the cathedral, the church of St. Agatha and the Communal Palace.

In 1446, Cremona was encircled by the condottieri troops of Francesco Piccinino and Luigi dal Verme. The siege was raised after the arrival of Scaramuccia da Forlì from Venice.

=== Foreign occupations ===
Historical flag of the City

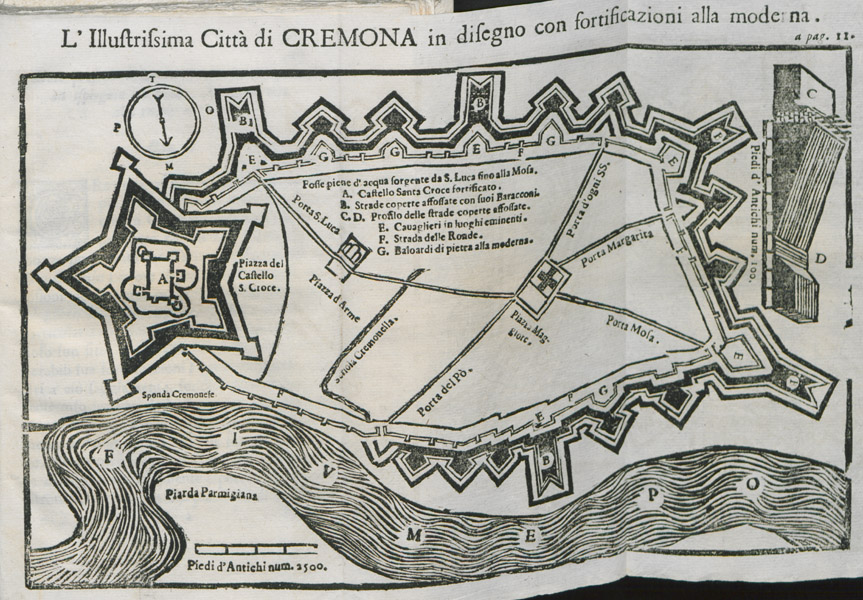
Cremona in the 17th century

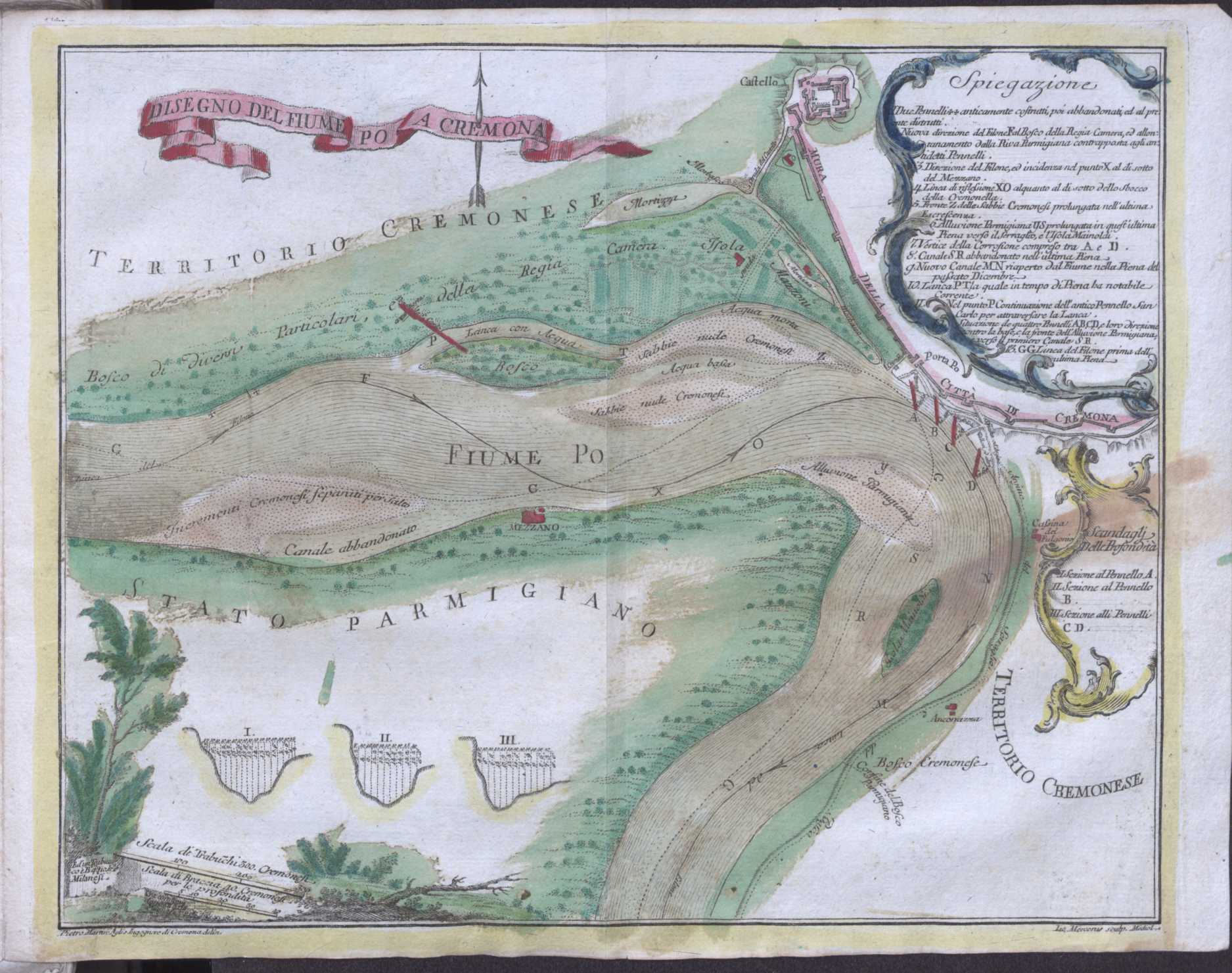
Po river in Cremona in the 18th century

From 1499 to 1509 Cremona was under Venetian control.

==== Republic of Venice ====
The victory of the Italian League at Agnadello gave it back to the Duchy of Milan.

==== Spain ====
However, Cremona was assigned to Spain under the Treaty of Noyon (1513). Cremona fell to the new rulers only in 1524 when the Castle of Santa Croce surrendered. The French were finally expelled from the duchy two years later, with the Treaty of Madrid, and subsequently Cremona remained a Spanish dominion for many years. During that time several building improvements or additions were made, including the Loggia of the cathedral's Porch by Lorenzo Trotti (1550) and the new church of San Siro and Sepolcro by Antonio Gialdini (1614).

During Spanish rule, Cremona saw the famine of 1628 and the plague of 1630.

==== Austria ====
The duchy, after a short-lived French conquest in 1701 during the War of the Spanish Succession, passed to Austria on 10 April 1707.

For later history, see Lombardy

== Demographics ==
Historical population

Year	Pop.	±%
1861	43,614	—
1871	43,109	−1.2%
1881	42,250	−2.0%
1901	49,191	+16.4%
1911	55,483	+12.8%
1921	58,450	+5.3%
1931	62,447	+6.8%
1936	64,019	+2.5%

Year	Pop.	±%
1951	68,636	+7.2%
1961	73,902	+7.7%
1971	82,094	+11.1%
1981	80,929	−1.4%
1991	74,113	−8.4%
2001	70,887	−4.4%
2011	69,589	−1.8%
2021	70,841	+1.8%

Source: ISTAT

== Architecture ==
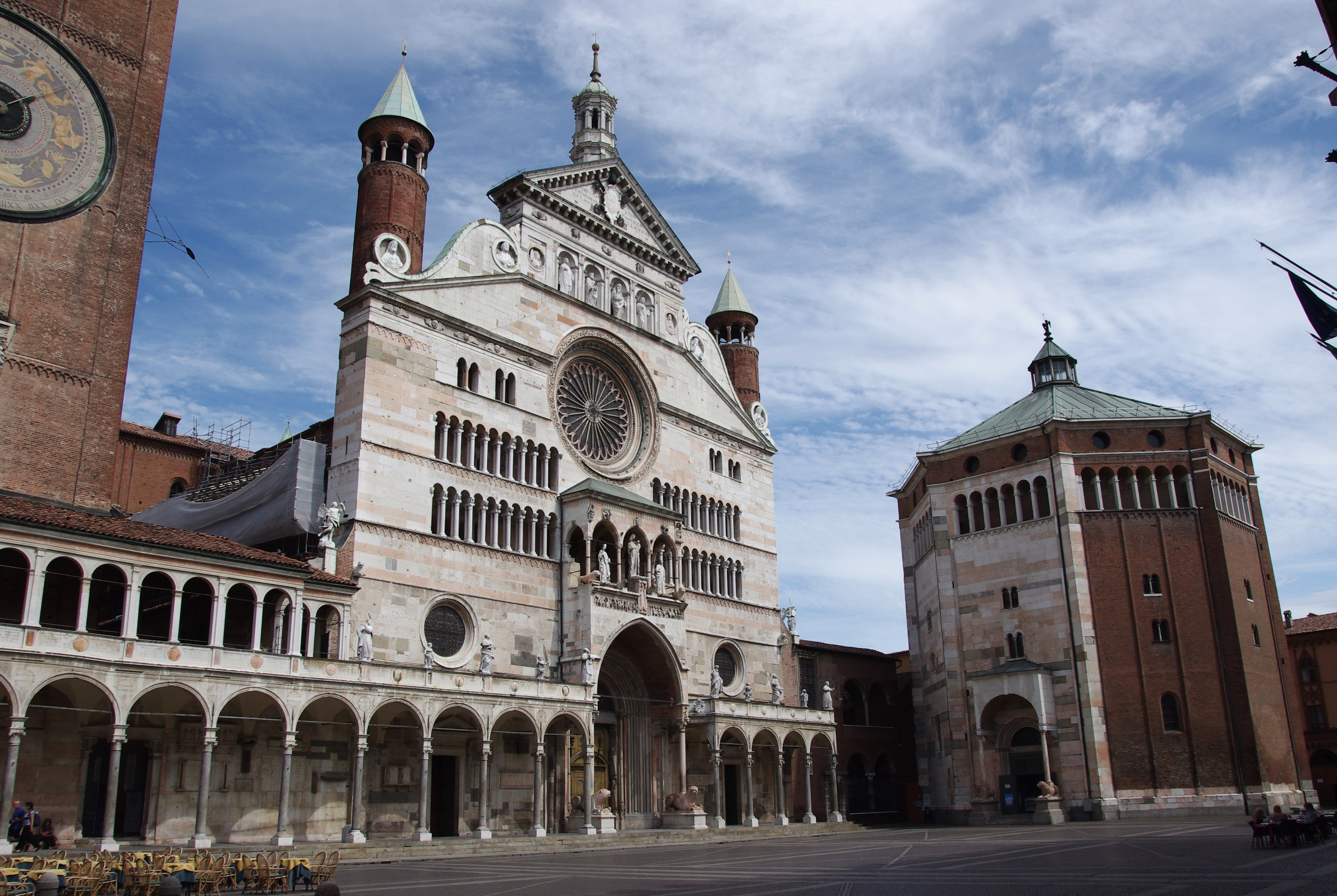
The Cathedral and the Baptistery of Cremona

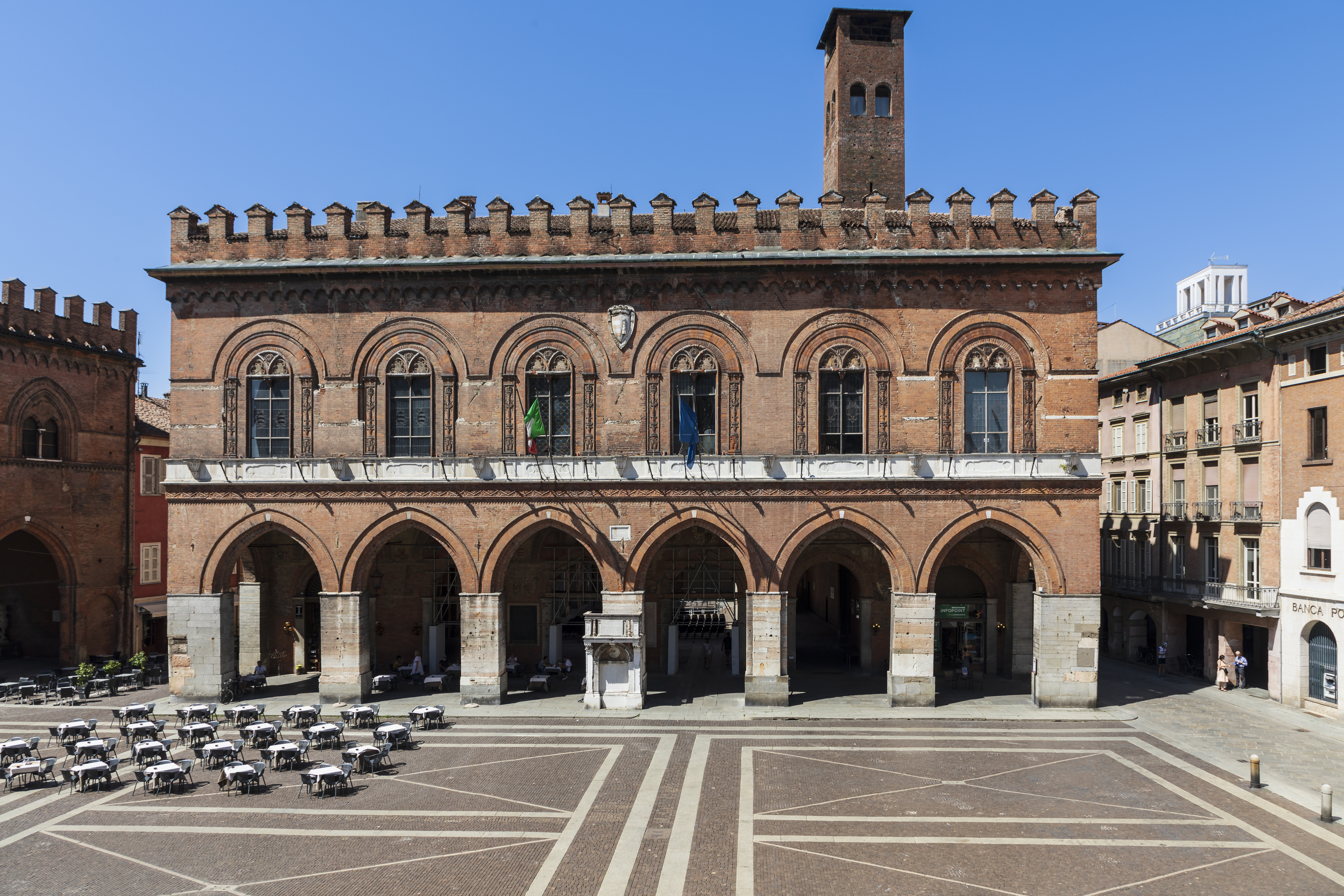
City hall (Palazzo del Comune)

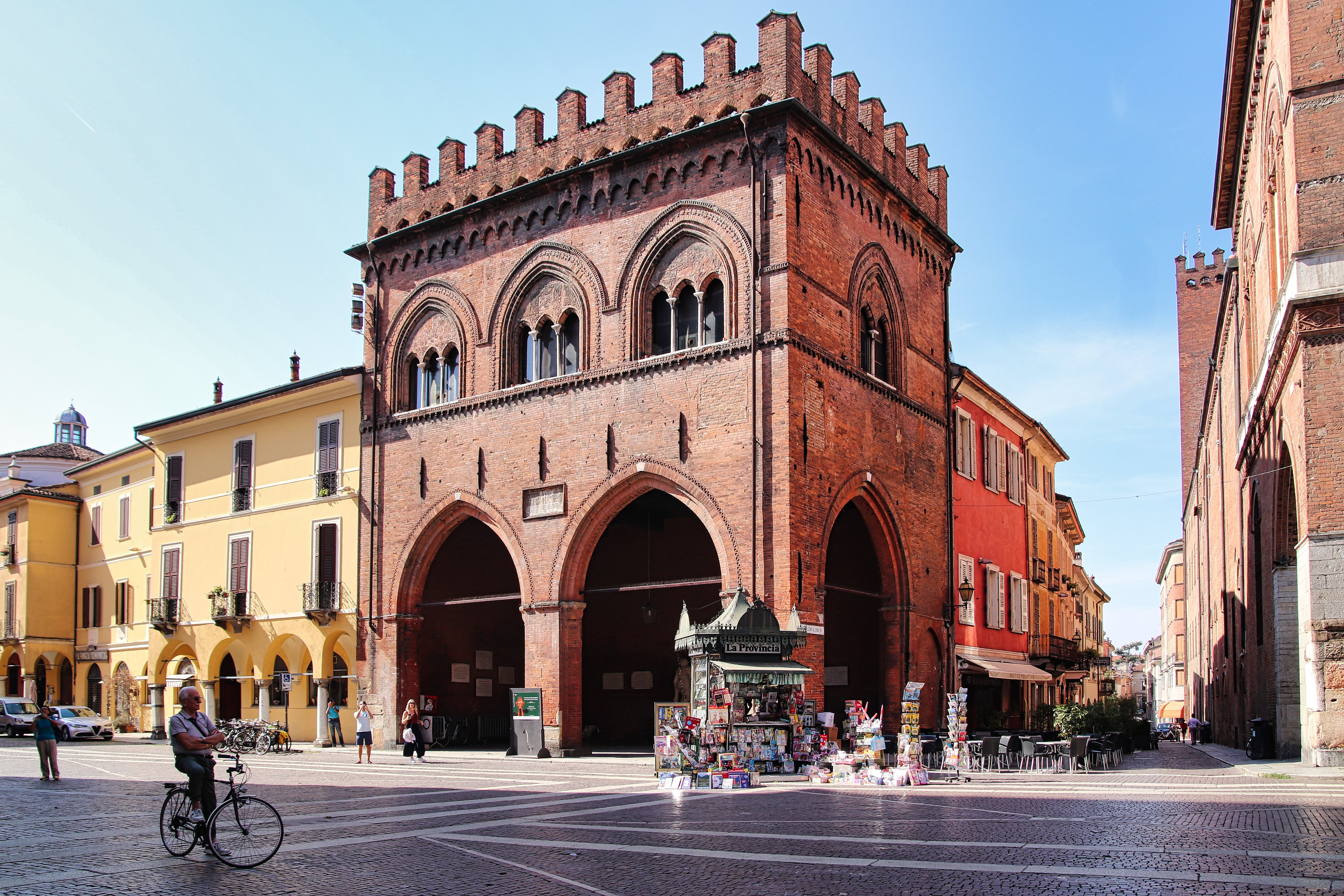
The Loggia dei Militi

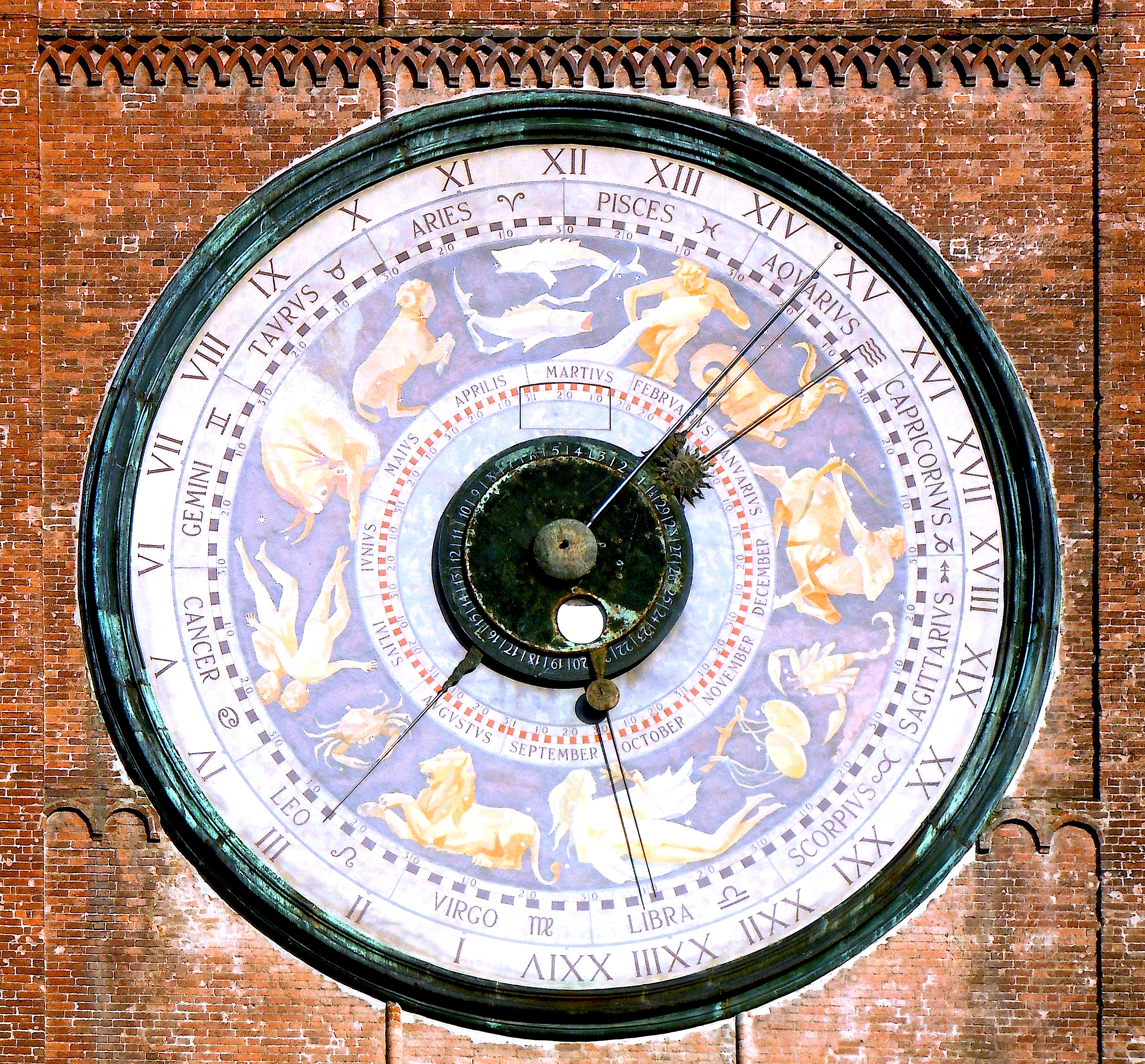
Astronomical clock on the Torrazzo belltower

=== Churches ===
The Cremona Cathedral with the annexed Baptistery constitutes one of the most notable sites for Romanesque-Gothic art in northern Italy.

Other churches include:

- Sant'Agata
- Sant'Agostino
- San Facio
- San Girolamo
- San Luca
- Santa Lucia
- San Marcellino
- San Michele
- San Pietro al Po
- Santa Rita
- San Sigismondo

=== Buildings ===
- The Torrazzo, the third highest brickwork bell tower in Europe
- Loggia dei Militi
- Palazzo Cittanova
- Palazzo Fodri
- Palazzo Comunale
- Cremona Courthouse
- Teatro Ponchielli
- Museo Berenziano
- Museo della Civiltà Contadina
- Museo Civico Ala Ponzone
- Museo del violino

== Economy ==
The economy of Cremona is deeply linked to the agricultural production of the countryside. Food industries include salted meat, sweets (torrone), vegetable oils, grana padano, provolone and "mostarda" (candied fruit in spicy mustard-flavored syrup, served with meats and cheese). Heavy industries include steel, oil and one electric plant. The river-port is a base for the barges transporting goods along the Po river.

== Music ==
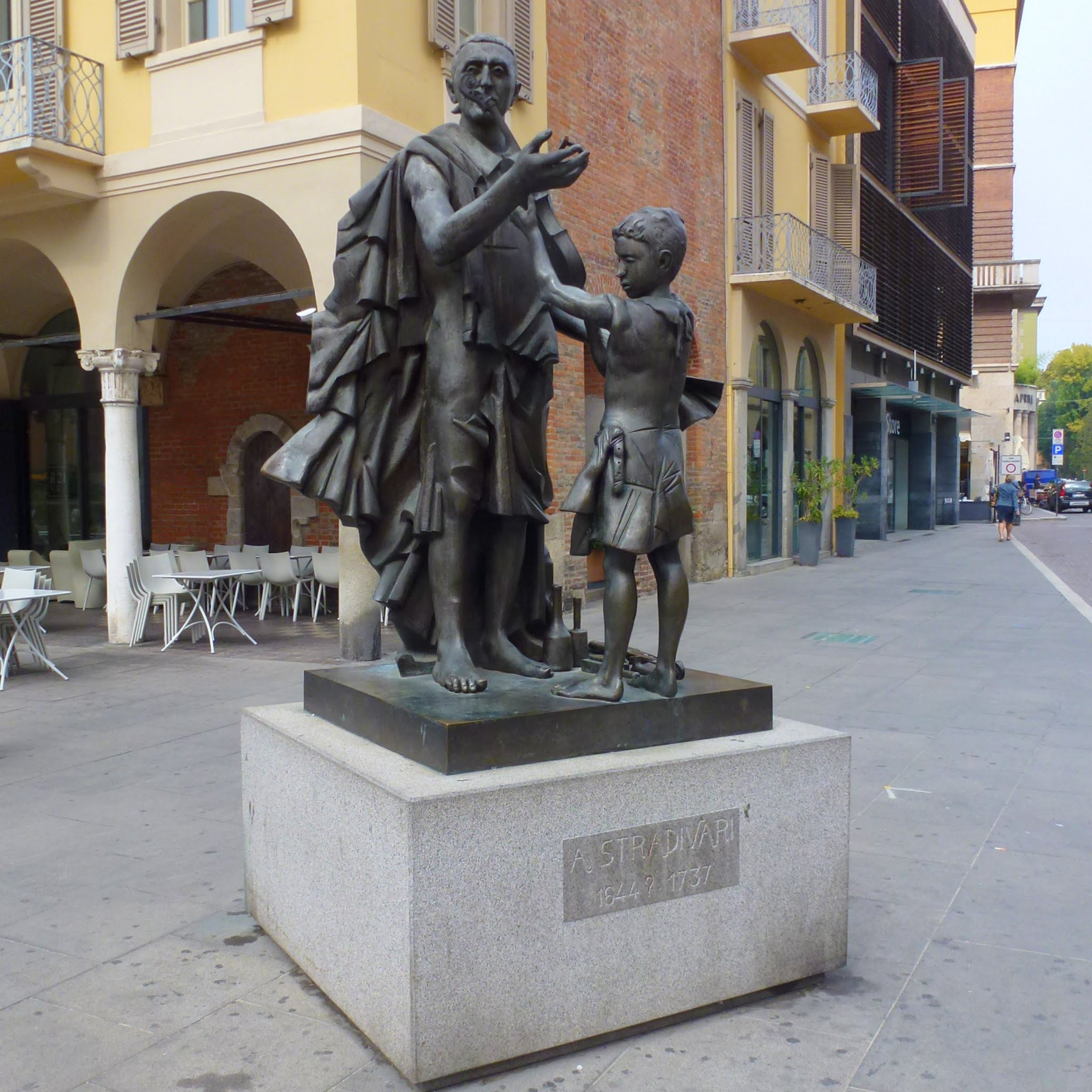
Statue of Stradivari in Stradivari Square

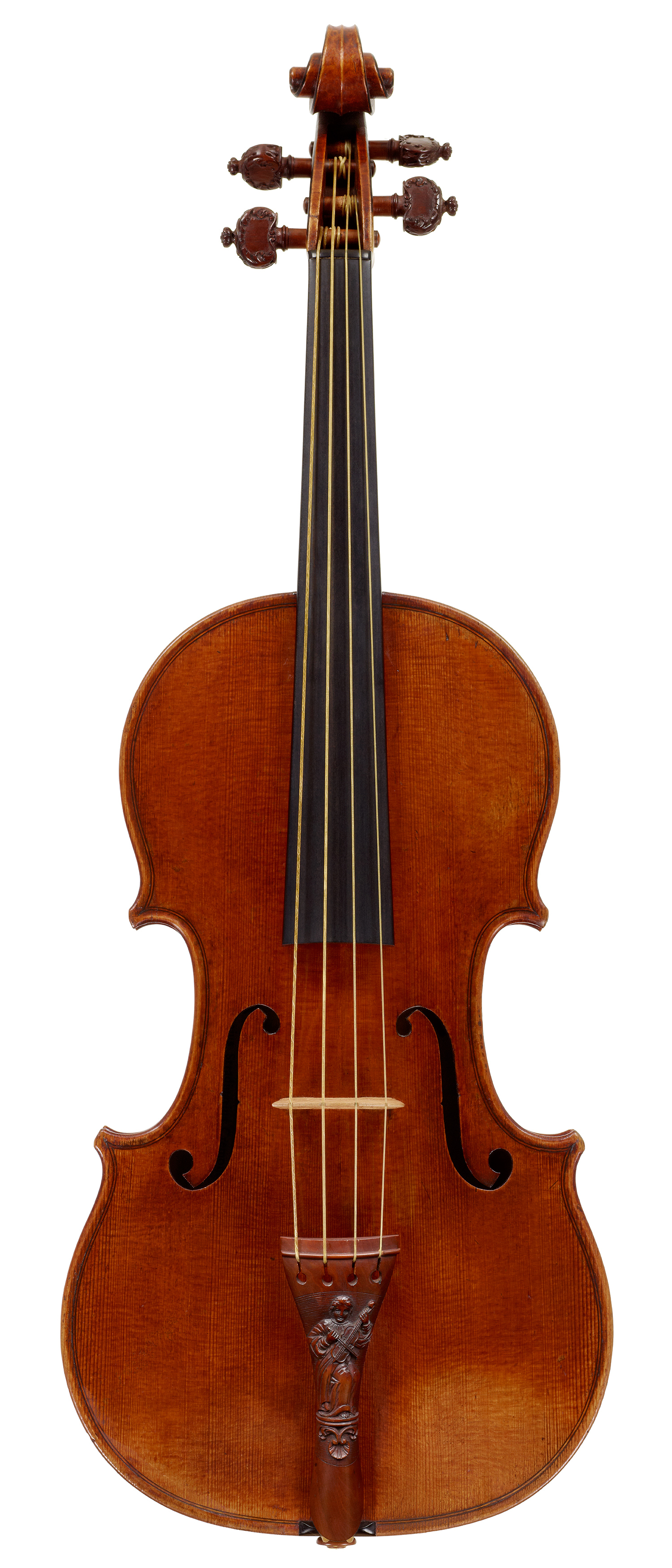
Lady Blunt Stradivarius

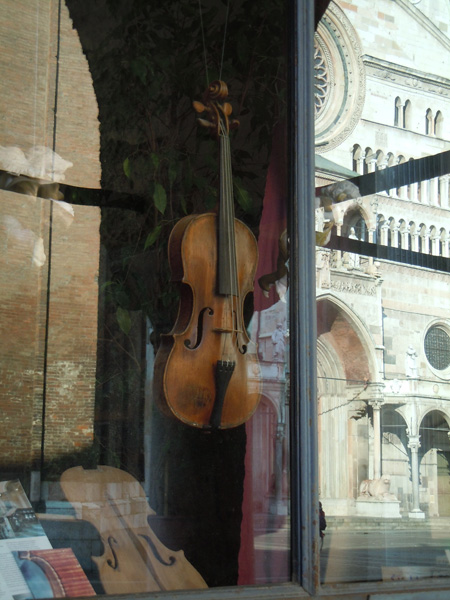
Violin shop

Cremona has a distinguished musical history. The 12th-century cathedral was a focus of organized musical activity in the region in the late Middle Ages. By the 16th century the town had become a famous musical centre. Nowadays there are important ensembles for Renaissance and Baroque music, i.e. Choir & Consort Costanzo Porta, and festivals which maintain Cremona as one of the most important towns in Italy for music. Composer Marc'Antonio Ingegneri taught there; Claudio Monteverdi was his most famous student, before leaving for Mantua in 1591. Cremona was the birthplace of Pierre-Francisque Caroubel, a collaborator with noted German composer Michael Praetorius. The bishop of Cremona, Nicolò Sfondrati, a fervent supporter of the Counter-Reformation, became Pope Gregory XIV in 1590. Since he was an equally fervent patron of music, the renown of the town as a musical destination grew accordingly.

Beginning in the 16th century, Cremona became renowned as a centre of musical instrument manufacture, with the violins of the Amati and Rugeri families, and later the products of the Guarneri and Stradivari workshops. To the present day, their handmade work is widely considered to be the summit of achievement in string instrument making. Cremona is still renowned for producing high-quality instruments, rare examples of which can be seen when visiting the local Museo del Violino. The 1937 National Violin Making Exhibition and Competition in Cremona, held again in 1949, helped solidify Cremona as the modern capital of the violin making tradition and inspired the Antonio Stradivari International Triennale Violin Making Competition - known as "the Olympics of Violin Making" - held every three years in Cremona since 1976. In 2012 the "Traditional violin craftsmanship in Cremona" was declared an intangible cultural heritage by UNESCO. Internationally, the city's craftsmen are renowned for the unique process used in crafting bowed stringed instruments which are assembled and moulded by hand without using any industrial materials.

Cremona had a band tradition linked to the Guardia nazionale founded under Napoleonic influence. In 1864, native son Amilcare Ponchielli became its leader and created what might be considered one of the greatest bands of all time. In his role as capobanda, Ponchielli founded a band school and a tradition that waned only at the onset of World War I.

== Transport ==
Cremona railway station, opened in 1863, is a terminus of six railway lines, all of which are regional (semi-fast) or local services.

Main destinations are Pavia, Mantua, Milan, Treviglio, Parma, Brescia, Piacenza and Fidenza.

== Sport ==
Cremona's favourite sport is football. The US Cremonese played for several years in Serie A, its most renowned players being Aristide Guarneri, Emiliano Mondonico, Antonio Cabrini and Gianluca Vialli — all born in or near Cremona. The brightest page in the more than one-century-old history of Cremonese was written in the early 1990s, when the president of the team was Domenico Luzzara and the coach was Gigi Simoni; the team managed to stay in Serie A for three consecutive years, ending one championship at tenth place. By defeating English team Derby County in the Final to win the Anglo-Italian Cup (27 March 1993), Cremonese became the second Italian team in football history to win at Wembley. US Cremonese is currently playing in Serie A for the 2025-26 season.

Cremona, by the 1980s, had built a strong basketball tradition, now brought on by Vanoli Basket, a team from Soresina which however usually plays in Cremona.

Cremona has also a waterpolo club that play in the regional divisions. There is a century-old tradition in rowing and canoe racing, with three different clubs, located along the Po river, that trained many world and Olympic champions.

== Twin towns – sister cities ==
Cremona is twinned with:

- Alaquàs, Spain, since 2004
- Krasnoyarsk, Russia, since 2006
- Füssen, Germany, since 2018

== Notable people ==
Notable people born in or associated with Cremona include:

- Publius Quinctilius Varus (46 BC – AD 9), Roman general and politician
- Marcus Furius Bibaculus (103 BC – ? BC), a Roman poet.
- Liutprand of Cremona (c. 920 – 972), bishop of Cremona, historian, and author.
- Saint Homobonus, (12th C.) patron saint of Cremona, as well as business people, tailors, shoemakers, and clothworkers
- Gerard of Cremona (c. 1114 – 1187), translator of scientific books from Arabic into Latin.
- Sicard of Cremona (1155–1215), prelate, historian and writer
- Bernardino Ricca (1450–?), painter
- Filippo de Lurano (c. 1475 – after 1520), an Italian composer of the Renaissance.
- Marco Girolamo Vida (c. 1489 – 1566), scholar, Latin poet and bishop.
- Altobello Melone (c. 1490 – pre-1543) an Italian painter of the Renaissance.
- Francesco and Giuseppe Dattaro (c. 1495 – 1576) & (c. 1540 – 1616), father and son team of architects
- Girolamo del Prato (16th C.), sculptor and craftsman
- Gianello della Torre (c. 1500 – 1585) Italo-Spanish clockmaker, engineer and mathematician.
- Giulio Campi (1500–1572), painter.
- Andrea Amati (1505–1577), luthier.
- Bernardino Campi (1522–1592), painter.
- Costanzo Porta (c. 1528 – 1601), an Italian composer of the Renaissance
- Sofonisba Anguissola (c. 1532 – 1625), painter of the Renaissance.
- Benedetto Pallavicino (c. 1551 – 1601), an Italian composer and organist of the late Renaissance.
- Claudio Monteverdi (1567–1643), composer of the late Renaissance and early Baroque eras.
- Giulio Calvi (c. 1570 – 1596), an Italian painter of the Renaissance.
- Luca Cattapani (born c. 1570) an Italian painter of the late-Renaissance
- Gaspare Aselli (1581–1626), physician.
- Tarquinio Merula (1595–1665), an Italian composer, organist and violinist of the early Baroque era.
- Nicolò Amati (1596–1684), luthier.
- Francesco Rugeri (c. 1628–1698), luthier
- Antonio Stradivari (c. 1644–1737), renowned luthier.
- Vincenzo Rugeri (1663–1719), luthier
- Luigi Guido Grandi (1671–1742), monk, priest, philosopher, theologian, mathematician, and engineer
- Giuseppe Guarneri (1698–1744), luthier
- Francesco Bianchi (1752–1810), an Italian opera composer.
- Giovanni Pallavera (1818–1886), painter
- Amilcare Ponchielli (1834–1886), composer.
- Eugenio Beltrami (1835–1900), mathematician
- Arcangelo Ghisleri (1855–1938), an Italian geographer, writer and Socialist politician.
- Leonida Bissolati (1857–1920), leading exponent of the Italian socialist movement at the turn of the 19th C.
- Alve Valdemi del Mare (1885–1972), painter
- Primo Mazzolari (1890–1959), priest and writer
- Roberto Farinacci (1892–1945), fascist politician
- Aldo Protti (1920–1995), an Italian baritone opera singer
- Ugo Tognazzi (1922–1990), actor, director, and screenwriter
- Danilo Montaldi (1929-1975), Marxist writer and activist
- Mina (born 1940), singer (nicknamed the Tiger of Cremona)
- Giovanni Lucchi (1942–2012), bowmaker
- Franco Mari (born 1947), an Italian actor and comedian.
- Sergio Cofferati (born 1948), member of European Parliament and former mayor of Bologna
- Carlo Cottarelli (born 1954), Italian economist
- Massimo Capra (born 1960), Italian-born Canadian celebrity chef.
- Sandrone Dazieri (born 1964), crime writer
- Alessandro Magnoli Bocchi (born 1968), Italian economist
- Chiara Ferragni (born 1987), blogger, businesswoman, fashion designer and model
- Quartetto di Cremona (formed 2000), Italian string quartet

=== Sport ===
- Oreste Perri (born 1951), sprint canoeist in the 1970s and mayor of Cremona from 2009 to 2014
- Antonio Cabrini (born 1957), footballer and manager
- Gianluca Vialli (1964–2023), footballer and manager
- Manolo Guindani (born 1971), retired footballer and manager
- Giacomo Gentili (born 1997), world rowing champion

== Climate ==
According to the Köppen climate classification, Cremona experiences a humid subtropical climate (Cfa).

Climate data for Cremona (1981–2010)
Month	Jan	Feb	Mar	Apr	May	Jun	Jul	Aug	Sep	Oct	Nov	Dec	Year
Mean daily maximum °C (°F)	4.9 (40.8)	7.5 (45.5)	13.5 (56.3)	17.6 (63.7)	23.2 (73.8)	27.4 (81.3)	29.9 (85.8)	29.0 (84.2)	24.2 (75.6)	17.5 (63.5)	10.4 (50.7)	6.0 (42.8)	17.6 (63.7)
Daily mean °C (°F)	2.4 (36.3)	4.3 (39.7)	9.4 (48.9)	13.4 (56.1)	18.8 (65.8)	22.7 (72.9)	25.1 (77.2)	24.5 (76.1)	20.1 (68.2)	14.4 (57.9)	8.0 (46.4)	3.8 (38.8)	13.9 (57.0)
Mean daily minimum °C (°F)	−0.1 (31.8)	1.1 (34.0)	5.3 (41.5)	9.2 (48.6)	14.3 (57.7)	17.9 (64.2)	20.3 (68.5)	20.0 (68.0)	16.0 (60.8)	11.3 (52.3)	5.6 (42.1)	1.6 (34.9)	10.2 (50.4)
Average precipitation mm (inches)	63 (2.5)	61 (2.4)	66 (2.6)	77 (3.0)	71 (2.8)	69 (2.7)	53 (2.1)	70 (2.8)	62 (2.4)	100 (3.9)	100 (3.9)	67 (2.6)	859 (33.7)
Average precipitation days (≥ 1.0 mm)	7	6	7	7	8	6	5	5	4	7	8	6	76
Source 1: Istituto Superiore per la Protezione e la Ricerca Ambientale (precipitation 1951–1980)
Source 2: Climi e viaggi (precipitation days)
