= Ardatov Urban Settlement =

Ardatov Urban Settlement is the name of several municipal formations in Russia.

- Ardatov Urban Settlement, a municipal formation which the town of district significance of Ardatov in Ardatovsky District of the Republic of Mordovia is incorporated as
- Ardatov Urban Settlement, a municipal formation which the Work Settlement of Ardatov in Ardatovsky District of Nizhny Novgorod Oblast is incorporated as

== See also ==
- Ardatov, several inhabited localities in Russia
