= Ardatovo =

Ardatovo (Russian: Ардатово) is the name of several rural localities in Russia.

Modern localities

- Ardatovo, Republic of Bashkortostan, a village in Maksyutovsky Selsoviet of Kugarchinsky District of the Republic of Bashkortostan
- Ardatovo, Republic of Mordovia, a selo in Ardatovsky Selsoviet of Dubyonsky District of the Republic of Mordovia

Historical names

- Ardatovo, former name of the town of Ardatov in Ardatovsky District of the Republic of Mordovia
