= Turgenevsky =

Turgenevsky (masculine), Turgenevskaya (feminine), or Turgenevskoye (neuter) may refer to:

- Turgenevskoye Urban Settlement, a municipal formation into which Turgenevo Work Settlement in Ardatovsky District of the Republic of Mordovia, Russia is incorporated
- Turgenevsky (rural locality), several rural localities in Russia
- Turgenevskaya, a station of the Moscow Metro, Moscow, Russia
