= Cavalcade (disambiguation) =

A cavalcade is a horseback procession, parade, or mass trail ride.

Cavalcade may also refer to:

== Arts, entertainment, and media ==
- Cavalcade (play), a play by Noël Coward
  - Cavalcade (1933 film), Academy Award-winning film adaptation of the play
- Cavalcade (1960 film), Argentine film
- Cavalcade (magazine), defunct British news magazine

=== Music ===
- Cavalcade (Black Midi album), a 2021 album by rock band Black Midi
- Cavalcade (Catamenia album), a 2010 album by metal band Catamenia
- Cavalcade (The Flatliners album), a 2010 album by The Flatliners
- Cavalcade (The Slow Readers Club album), a 2015 album by the Slow Readers Club

== Other uses ==
- Cavalcade (horse) (1931–1940), thoroughbred horse
- Cavalcade (METRORail station), rapid transit station in Houston, Texas, United States
- Suzuki GV1400 Cavalcade, a Suzuki luxury touring motorcycle available from 1985 to 1988 in North America
