= Ivar Lissner =

German author, journalist, and spy (1909–1967)

Ivar Arthur Nicolai Lissner
- Born: 23 April 1909; Lievenhof, Vitebsk Governorate, Russian Empire
- Died: 4 September 1967 (aged 58); Montreux, Switzerland
- Occupations: Journalist, author
- Known for: World War II Nazi spy
- Spouse: Ruth Niehaus
- Children: Imogen Jochem

Ivar Arthur Nicolai Lissner (23 April 1909 – 4 September 1967) was a German journalist and author, and a Nazi spy during World War II.

== Early life and education ==
Born to a German-Jewish father, Robert Lissner, and mother Charlotte Lissner (née Gensz), Lissner was a Baltic German of Jewish ancestry. His father was a Kommerzienrat (commerce councillor) and businessman who owned cork factories and other enterprises. Before the First World War the family moved to Moscow. They were exiled in 1917 to the Volga region and returned to Moscow after the war. The political upheavals of the postwar period resulted in the family fleeing to Riga and then to Berlin, where Lissner attended high school. He studied languages, history, anthropology and law at Greifswald, Berlin, Göttingen, Erlangen, Lyon (1931–1932) and at the Sorbonne in Paris. He obtained his PhD in Foreign Trade Law in April 1936 in Erlangen.

== Career ==
On 1 April 1933, Lissner joined the Nazi Party (NSDAP). Only one year later Lissner claimed party membership since the beginning of 1932 and also pretended to be a member of the SS since the end of 1932. These claims were designed to conceal his Jewish background and to prevent any doubts as to whether he was an "Aryan".

In 1935 he published his first book (Blick nach Draußen, "Looking Outside") which was commercially unsuccessful but achieved the desired goal: creating the perception that he was loyal to the Nazi regime. By writing this book he was able to style himself as an "ambassador" of German "values". One year later, in 1936, Ivar's father Robert Lissner was able to get hold of a forged Aryan certificate from the St. Peter's Church in Riga. It seems that this led to a more relaxed situation for the Lissner family. Ivar Lissner started a trip around the world on behalf of his publishing house "Hanseatische Verlagsanstalt" and visited the US, Canada, the Far and the Near East. His second (Völker und Kontinente ("Peoples and Continents") and third book (Menschen und Mächte am Pazifik ("People and Powers in the Pacific Region"), published 1936 and 1937, became commercially successful and had the character of travel reports. Unusually for this period his books largely abstained from any pro-Nazi views. Lissner wrote for the Hanseatic Service, the press service of his publisher, and some of his articles were, according to Heinz Höhne, also printed in Der Angriff.

When Lissner returned to Germany in January 1937, his father Robert was arrested by the Gestapo. They suspected him of being a Jew but were unable to prove it. So his father was released in poor health. Only after this episode Lissner, who, according to Höhne, never knew about his Jewish descent until the arrest of his father, began to distance himself from Nazism, but maintained an anti-Soviet attitude as a result of his experiences in Russia. This description of Höhne is contradicted by an article published on the Lissner website. According to this, Lissner always knew about his Jewish origins and never had a pro-Nazi attitude.

In 1938 he returned to East Asia on behalf of Hanseatische Verlagsanstalt and the Abwehr (the German secret service). He reported on the Japanese fighting on the Korean-Soviet border, was interviewed by Japanese newspapers and provided information to the German ambassador. He also initiated contacts between the Japanese and German military intelligence, and during his stay in Manchuria in 1938 he acted as interpreter at the defection of the KGB chief for the Far East, Genrikh Samoilovich Lyushkov. He was given exclusive rights to publish the story in the press. In 1939, while in Japan, he used as cover that he was a correspondent for Völkischer Beobachter and Der Angriff. He established contacts with the Propaganda Department and the German Embassy in Tokyo (historian Höhne describes him as an unofficial press attaché) and was at that time a respected member of the Nazi-aligned German community in Tokyo. In September 1939 the Gestapo once again investigated the case of Lissner's father and arrested him, as they believed they now had reliable evidence. Lissner consequently lost his post in Tokyo and a proceeding was opened to exclude him from the NSDAP. Lissner urged the Abwehr to release his Jewish father from Gestapo prison. This task was managed by Karl Sack and Hans von Dohnányi. Three weeks after his arrest, Robert Lissner was released. After this, Robert's wife Charlotte sold their whole furniture by auction. In mid 1940 Robert and Charlotte Lissner left Germany for Shanghai, where Percy Lissner worked for AEG. Lissner's sister Sigrid remained in Berlin despite the promise of the Abwehr that the whole Lissner family would be allowed to leave Germany. In 1941 she was murdered by the Gestapo.

Ambassador Eugen Ott employed Lissner for four more months "for reasons of expediency" after he urged the German Foreign Office that this would be "the only way to prevent Lissner from going over to the enemy" (the Allied Forces). The German Embassy in Shanghai and the leader of the NSDAP in Japan ("Landesgruppenleiter") were continuously informed by Ott about the lawsuit against Lissner. Ott also tried to expatriate him because of his Jewish origins. This was the basis of the persecution of Lissner in Manchuria. It seems that Josef Albert Meisinger later circulated the false accusations that Lissner was a Soviet spy based on Ott's idea.

== Espionage ==
In the summer of 1940 (according to Höhne) "Werner Schulz" recruited Lissner for the Abwehr after they promised to release his father from prison and let him move with his wife to Shanghai where his brother Percy was working for AEG. They also promised to restore his reputation in Tokyo.

This description by Höhne is wrong. An article published on the Lissner website concludes that "Hauptmann Werner Schulz" who, referring to Heinz Höhne, should have been responsible for Lissner’s recruitment into the Abwehr, was most likely a "fictitious construction of Heinz Höhne". It seems that Höhne used "Werner Schulz" to impute Lissner with a pro-Nazi attitude. According to the article Lissner was active in the German resistance movement. His agent controller, Captain Friedrich Busch, was a sincere anti-Nazi who saved several social democrats from concentration camp and who often shut his eyes to the fact that agents working for him were also working for the Allied intelligence services. In fact the sources mentioned in the article show that "Hauptmann Schulz"’s biography is a combination of the biographies of two other Abwehr members, Dr. Julius Berthold Schultze and Gideon Richard Werner Schüler. Indeed Lissner was recruited much earlier (in 1938) after the first arrest of his father. Lissner then travelled to East Asia with the cover of a newspaper correspondent. Actually he never was a member of the "Reichspressekammer" (Reich Press Chamber). According to the article this fact was concealed by Höhne through the deletion of all relevant passages and contrary assurances of Ivar Lissner in his memoirs, and Höhne's own inadequate research. In addition Höhne misquoted a letter of Lissner to the British historian Deakin in his epilogue to the Lissner memoirs. He used this wrong quotation as a "proof" that Lissner had denied any connection with the "VB". Actually Lissner only denied having been a member of the "Reichspressekammer", the prerequisite for working as a newspaper correspondent, and confirmed that he had pretended to work "for those gangsters" during a period lasting 33 days.

With the help of German merchants and Russian exiles in Harbin, he built a spy network that reached as far as Siberia. In September 1940 Lissner was instructed by Admiral Canaris to supply all information he had available to prevent an invasion of the Soviet Union. Canaris thought very highly of Lissner's work which provided him with detailed information about Soviet troops and commanders in the Far East. But despite the detailed information he received from Lissner, which showed the pointlessness of a war with the Soviet Union, he was unable to convince Hitler's headquarters. By March 1943 Lissner's network was the only source of information on the Asian Soviet Union and the Manchurian region.

After the murder of his sister in Germany, Lissner urged the Abwehr to get an official decision that he and his family in Shanghai were equivalent to German citizens. In August 1941 Lissner was partly rehabilitated. His agent controller, Captain Friedrich Busch, sent a telegram that informed Lissner that his demands were fully granted. This was in fact untrue. Actually the decision concerned only Lissner himself but not his family in Shanghai. Some time later Hans von Dohnanyi secretly informed Lissner about the real decision and that after the war the full force of the law would be applied to his Jewish father Robert Lissner. In this almost hopeless situation, Lissner's friend Werner Crome provided help. Crome used his contacts in Tokyo to get information concerning the case of Richard Sorge. In October 1941 Richard Sorge was arrested in Tokyo as a Soviet spy. He had maintained excellent relations in Nazi circles in Tokyo, including Ambassador Ott, who then tried to downplay the affair as a Japanese police intrigue. Also Josef Meisinger had failed. Lissner sent these facts in a radio message on 23 March 1942, to eliminate his greatest adversaries and the most dangerous opponents of his family in Shanghai. The news caused a scandal at the Foreign Office in Berlin, leading to Ott's dismissal. Foreign Minister von Ribbentrop ordered that future telegrams from Lissner be censored who after the outbreak of war with the Soviet Union had to use the wireless transmission net of the German Foreign Office before the final transmission to the Abwehr. Lissner was not allowed to resume his work as a correspondent and he was unable to regain his party membership. His official status with the Japanese had not been reinstated and the Abwehr could not help him.

Lissner tried to build up his own legend, claiming to be a high-ranking Gestapo officer (to the Japanese in Manchuria, he even described himself as Gestapo chief for the Far East). This was reported by German officials to the government in Tokyo, and to the actual head of the Gestapo in Japan, SS-Standartenführer Meisinger. Observers noted that Lissner regularly visited the Soviet consulate in Harbin. He exchanged information with the Soviets. This fact was known to and agreed with the Abwehr. So Meisinger was strictly ordered to keep quiet. But he decided to denounce Lissner as a "Soviet spy" to the Japanese secret service.

== Arrest ==
In June 1943 Lissner was arrested along with fellow journalist and friend Werner Crome, his Japanese secretary, and his German secretary. He spent two years in Japanese prisons in the hands of the Kempeitai (Japanese military police). He was severely tortured and at times wanted to commit suicide. He was later acquitted by a Japanese court and was released at the end of the war.

== Post-war life ==
After the war, from 1949 Lissner was editor in chief of the illustrated magazine Kristall, published by Axel Springer Verlag. He remained editor in chief until early 1956. He went to Munich and then to Paris, where he was a writer for Paris Match (with the title Grand Ecrivain Historique – Grand History Writer). Lissner was the author of several cultural and historical books, including Wir sind das Abendland ("We Are the West"), Wir alle suchen das Paradies ("We All Seek Paradise"), and Rätselhafte Kulturen ("Mysterious Cultures"). The books were translated into many languages and became bestsellers. He began writing his memoirs in English while in Japan shortly after the war but they were unfinished at his death (they only go to 1940). The second edition, published in 1975, includes an epilogue by Heinz Höhne.

Lissner was married to actress Ruth Niehaus and had a daughter, Imogen (now Imogen Jochem).

== Works by Lissner (selection) ==
=== English translations ===
- The Living Past

=== Works in German ===
- Blick nach Draußen. Frankreich, USA, England heute. Hanseatische VA, Hamburg 1935.
- Glaube, Mythos, Religion. Gondrom Verlag, Bindlach 1990, ISBN 3-8112-0641-9.
- Haftungsbeschränkung des Einzelkaufmanns nach ausländischem Recht. Pöppinghaus Verlag, Bochum 1936 (Dissertation, Universität Erlangen 1936).
- Mein gefährlicher Weg. Vergeben, aber nicht vergessen. Droemer Knaur, München 1975, ISBN 3-426-00396-1 (Autobiography, with epilogue Der Fall Lissner by Heinz Höhne, pp. 221–272).
- Der Mensch und seine Gottesbilder. Walter-Verlag, Olten 1982, ISBN 3-530-52709-2.
- Menschen und Mächte am Pazifik. 5. Aufl. Hanseatische VA, Hamburg 1943.
- Die Rätsel der großen Kulturen. Dtv, München 1979, ISBN 3-423-01498-9 (former title Rätselhafte Kulturen).
- So habt Ihr gelebt. Die großen Kulturen der Menschheit. Neuaufl. Dtv, München 1977, ISBN 3-423-01242-0.
- So lebten die römischen Kaiser. Von Macht und Wahn der Cäsaren. Dtv, München 1980, ISBN 3-423-01263-3 (former title Die Cäsaren).
- So lebten die Völker der Urzeit. Walter-Verlag, Olten 1975, ISBN 3-530-52708-4 (former title Aber Gott war da).
- Wir alle suchen das Paradies. ein Vermächtnis. Ullstein, Frankfurt/M. 1977, ISBN 3-548-03329-6.
- Wir sind das Abendland. Gestalten, Mächte und Schicksale durch 7000 Jahre. Gondrom Verlag, Bindlach 1993, ISBN 3-8112-1065-3 (Nachdr. d. Aufl Olten 1966).
