= Simbirsk State University =

Former university in Ulyanovsk, Russia

- Симбирский государственный университет
- Active: 1919–1921
- Location: Simbirsk, Russia
- Language: Russian

Simbirsk State University (Russian: Симбирский государственный университет) is a Higher education institution that existed from 1919 to 1921, the first university in Simbirsk.

== History ==
In 1918, at the initiative of the leadership of the Simbirsk province, the chairman of the Simbirsk provincial committee of the RCP (b) Iosif Vareikis and the chairman of the Simbirsk provincial executive committee M. A. Gimov, preparations began for the opening of a new higher educational institution; for this purpose, about 500,000 rubles were allocated from the state budget. On 30 October 1918, an academic board was elected and the Charter of the new university was approved.

On 3 February 1919, during the Civil War, the first higher educational institution in Simbirsk was opened - Simbirsk Proletarian University, in the approved Charter of the university, it was said that its goal "is to open access to education and science to the working masses and raise enlightenment among the broad masses of the people." Professor A. S. Arkhangelsky was appointed the first rector. The initial structure of the university consisted of two faculties: socio-economic and physics and mathematics. The term of study at the university was one year. The original curriculum consisted of sixteen subjects of study: pedagogy, physics, mathematics, astronomy, geology, history of ancient cultures, history of Russian literature, history of revolutionary movements, political economy, sociology, cultural history, psychology, hygiene, chemistry, commodity science and geoscience. Teaching at the university was carried out according to state programs, lectures were given by visiting professors from higher educational institutions of other regions.

On 22 February 1920, by order of the People's Commissariat of Education of the RSFSR, Simbirsk State University was established on the basis of the Simbirsk Proletarian University, according to the approved Regulations, the structure of the university included two associations: Cultural and Educational, with a term of study of one year and Educational, with a term of study of four years. The Cultural and Educational Association included two faculties: General Education, with subjects of study in physics, chemistry, mathematics, biology, geology, economic geography, astronomy, hygiene, history and literature and Social Sciences, with subjects of study in scientific socialism, political economy, history labor movement, history of the RCP, statistics and economic geography. The Faculty of Physics and Mathematics, which included the socio-historical department, became part of the Educational Association. P. Ya. Grechkin was elected the first rector of the university. The structure of the university included a working faculty and a higher school of Soviet workers created at the university. There are about thirty teachers in the composition of the professorial and pedagogical staff of the university. On 1 November 1920, classes began. The total number of students amounted to more than a thousand people, in 1921 there were already one and a half thousand.

On 24 August 1920, by the Decree of the Simbirsk Provincial Executive Committee, the university was named after Vladimir Lenin, and the Presidium of the Simbirsk State University V. I. Lenin was elected an honorary member of the university and honorary chairman of the University Council.

On 23 October 1921, by the Decree of the Council of People's Commissars of the USSR, due to the difficult socio-economic situation, Simbirsk State University was reorganized by merging it with the Russian Institute of Public Education into the Practical Institute of Public Education, this institution of higher education existed until 1923, after which it was finally closed.

=== Creation of the Simbirsk working faculty ===
On 1 October 1920, on the basis of the Simbirsk State University, according to the Decree of the Council of People's Commissars of the USSR of 17 September 1920 and the decision of the Presidium of the SSU named after V. I. Lenin, the Simbirsk Workers' Faculty was opened, created to train specialists from the environment of the proletariat and the peasantry. The official opening of the university took place on 3 January 1921. The structure of the faculty included four educational departments: preparatory, socio-economic, natural and physical and mathematical. About three hundred students were recruited as part of the faculty, including: the preparatory department - one hundred and fifty people and fifty people for each of the three educational departments. The first graduation of the faculty took place on 11 June 1923.

In 1924, the Simbirsk Workers' Faculty was renamed the Ulyanovsk Workers' Faculty named after V. I. Lenin. In 1924, forty-two people graduated from the working faculty, of which: eighteen graduates entered medical and agricultural higher educational institutions, and twenty-four graduates were sent to higher technical educational institutions. In 1939, the twenty-second last graduation of the Ulyanovsk Workers' Faculty named after V.I. Lenin took place and it was closed. From 1920 to 1939, during the existence of the faculty, 1621 specialists were graduated.

== University accommodation ==
The main educational building of the Simbirsk State University was located in the buildings of the former Simbirsk Provincial Zemstvo Council, the rest of the educational departments of the university were located in the building of the former Simbirsk Commercial School and in part of the first floor of the House-Monument to I. A. Goncharov, which housed the National Museum. In 1920, the provincial executive committee decided to transfer the building of the former district court to the university. On 6 August 1920, the Presidium of the Gubernia Executive Committee decided to "immediately and finally transfer the Goncharov Museum with all the inventory to the Faculty of Physics and Mathematics." For the hostel, the former house of Yurgens (Goncharov's house) was transferred to the university, which was subsequently transferred to the jurisdiction of the working faculty. In 1922, the building of the former Simbirsk male gymnasium was assigned to the working faculty.

University buildings from 1919 to 1922

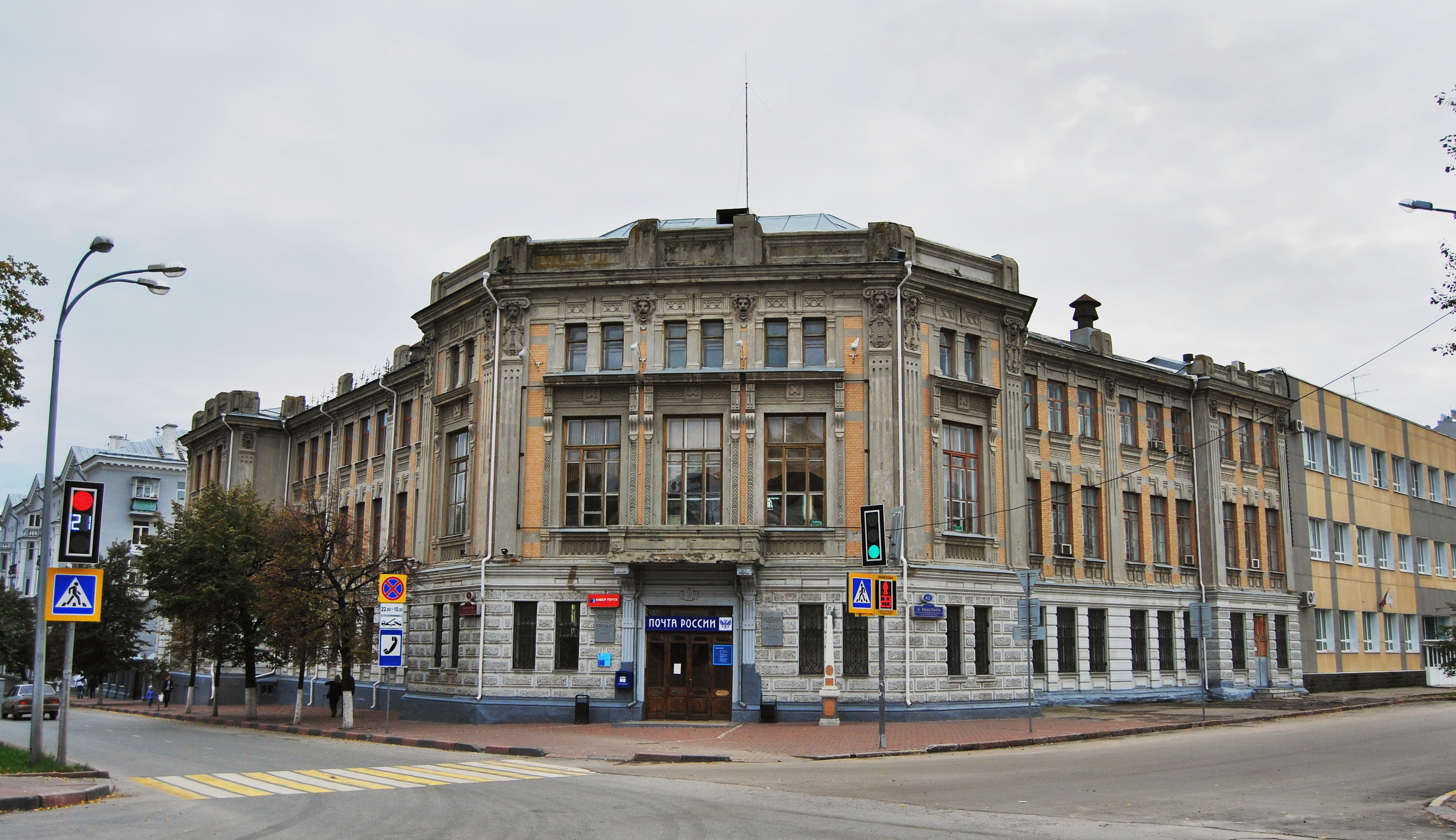
Chief Postman.

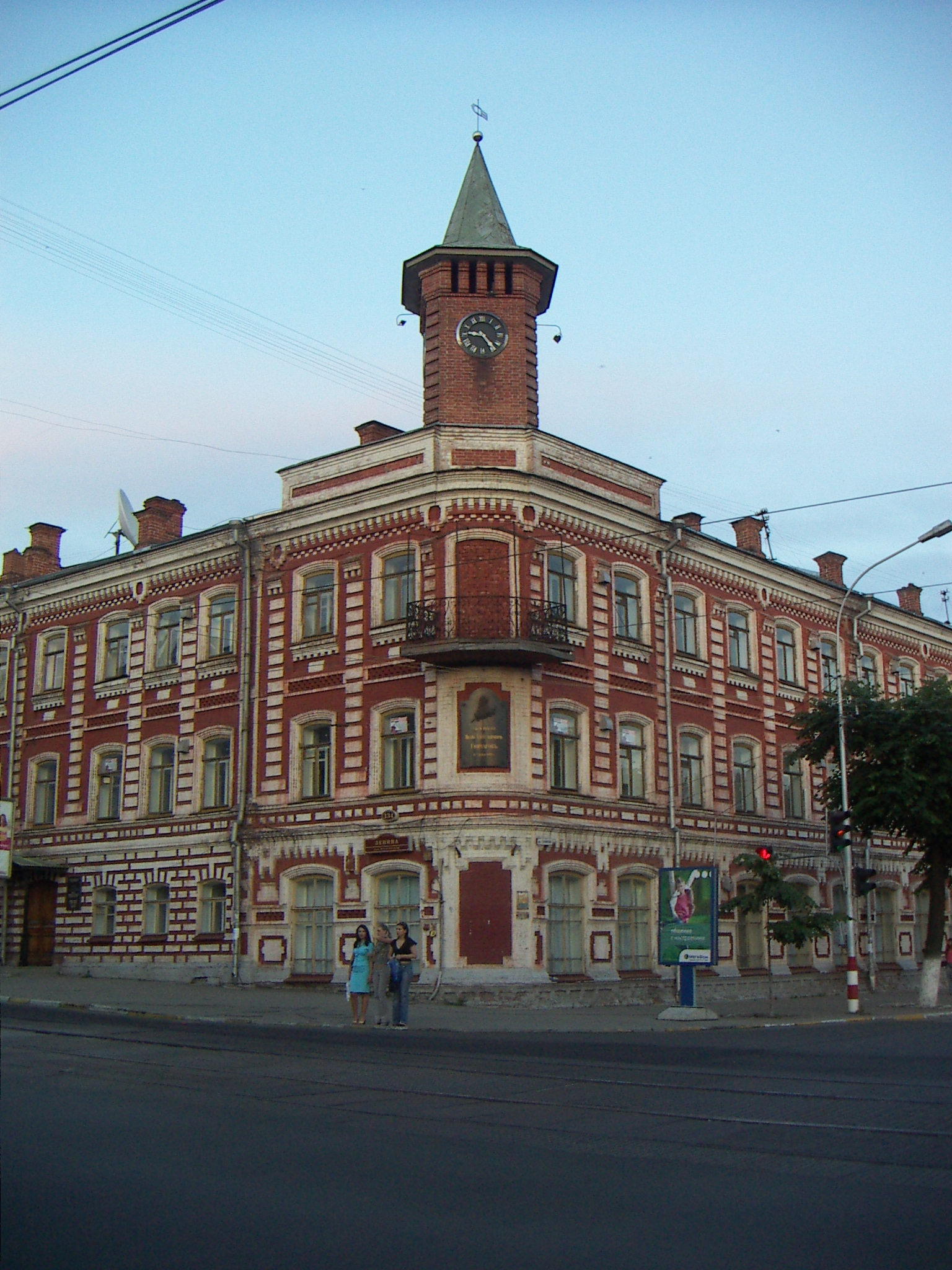
House-Museum of Goncharov.

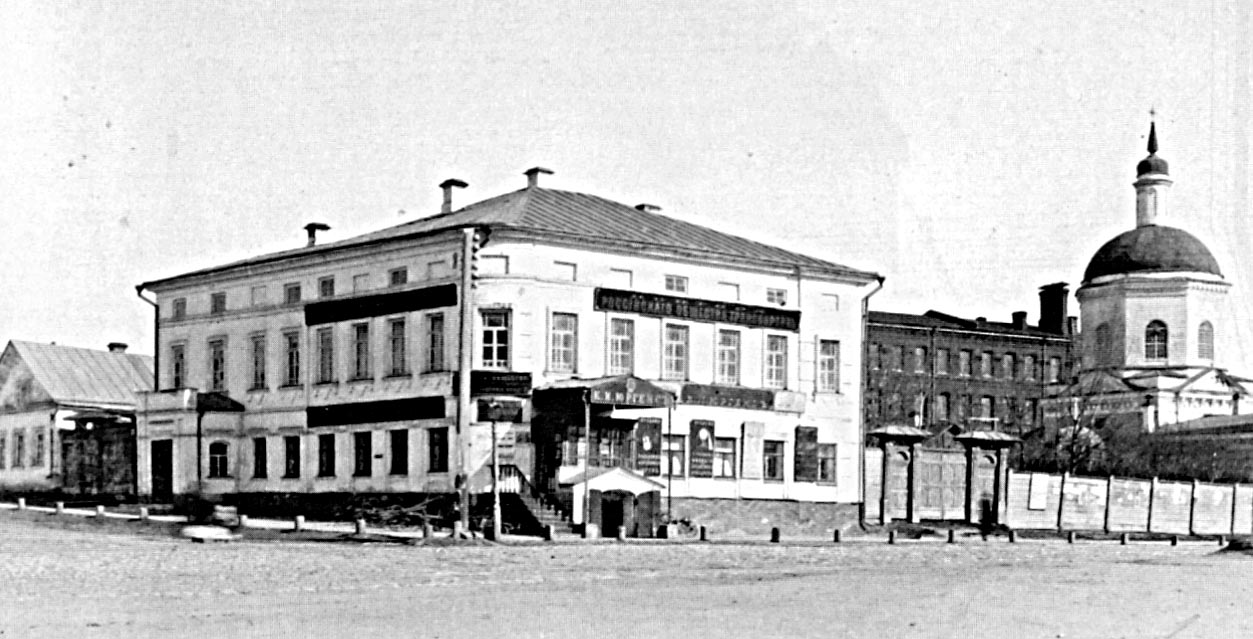
The house where I.A. Goncharov.

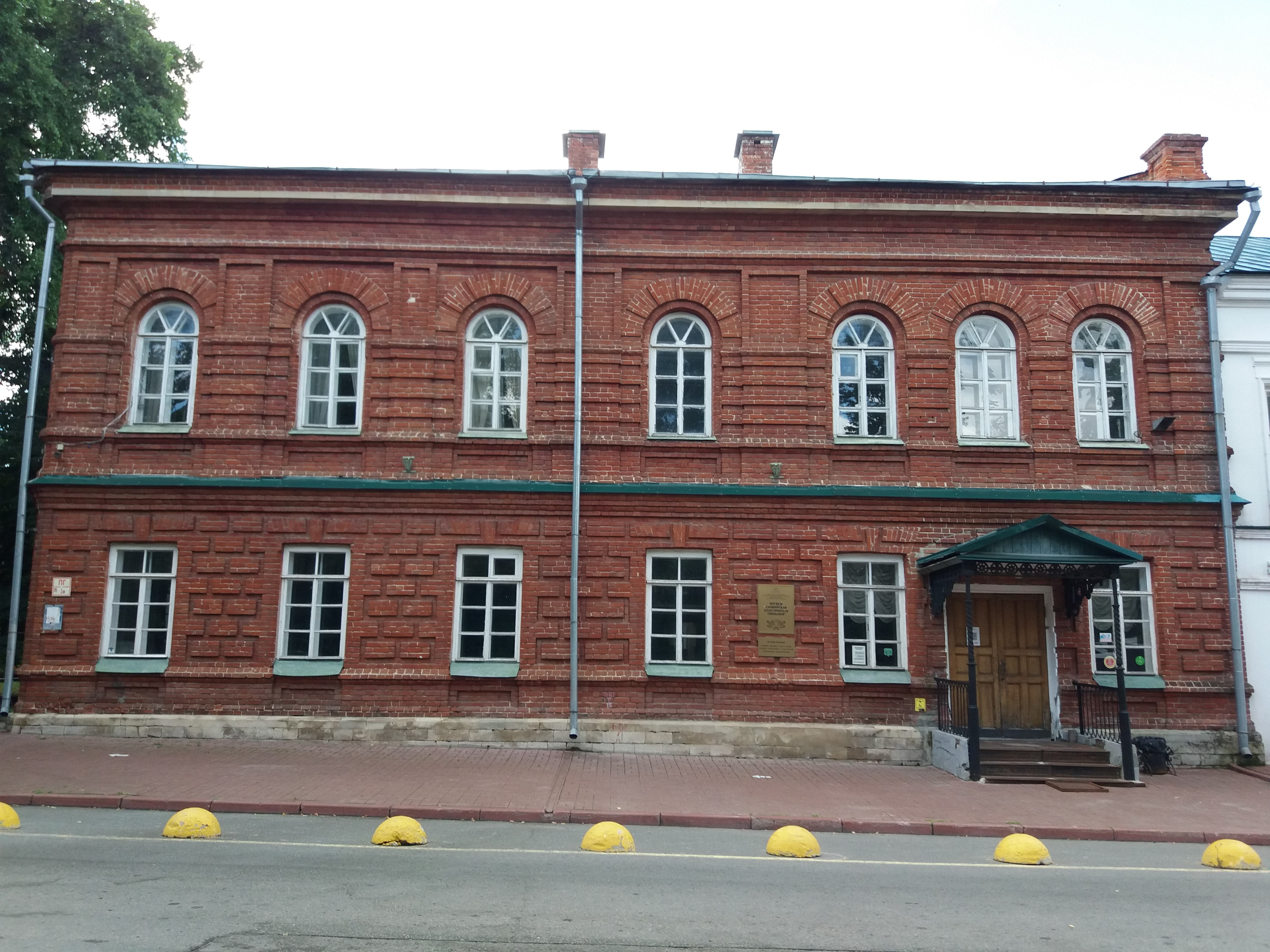
Simbirsk classical gymnasium.

== Management ==
- Arkhangelsky, Alexander Semenovich (1919–1920)
- Golman, Mikhail Borisovich (1920)
- Grechkin, Pavel Yakovlevich (1920–1921)

== Notable alumni and faculty ==
- Karabanov, Alexey Alekseevich
- Zyrin, Nikolai Grigorievich
- Gimov, Mikhail Andreevich
- Gladyshev, Mikhail Vasilievich

== Literature ==
- Учебные заведения Ульяновска. История возникновения / О. М. Репьев, Приволжское книжное изд-во, 1969 г. — 441 с.
- Высшее образование и подготовка научных кадров в СССР / К. Т. Галкин; под ред. проф. Н. А. Константинова. - Москва : Советская наука, 1958. — 176 с
- Ленин и Симбирск : Документы, материалы, воспоминания / [Сост. Н. Д. Фомин и др.; Предисл. Н. Д. Фомина, с. 5-30]. - 3-е изд., доп. - Саратов, 1982. — 527 с.
- Историко–статистический сборник. Симбирску-Ульяновску — 365 лет: Территориальный орган Федеральной службы государственной статистики по Ульяновской области. – Ульяновск, 2013. – 216 c.

== Sources ==
- "Календарь. 100 лет первому симбирскому университету". УлПравда ТВ.
- "Симбирский пролетарский университет". Ulyanovsk State University.
- "Исполняется 100 лет со дня открытия пролетарского университета". Государственный архив новейшей истории Ульяновской области.
