= Vladimir Ptukha =

Soviet politician

- Володимир Птуха; Владимир Птуха
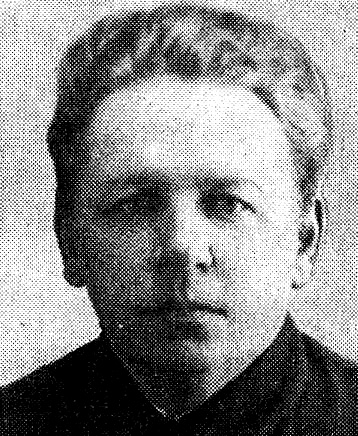

Second Secretary of the Far Eastern Regional Committee of the Communist Party of the Soviet Union
- In office 1935 – 13 September 1937
- Preceded by: Ervand Arsinbekov
- Succeeded by: Georgy Statsevich

First Secretary of the Stalingrad Regional Committee of the Communist Party of the Soviet Union
- In office January 1934 – 20 March 1935
- Preceded by: Office established
- Succeeded by: Iosif Vareikis

First Secretary of the Lower Volga Regional Committee of the Communist Party of the Soviet Union
- In office 6 January 1931 – 19 January 1934
- Preceded by: Boris Sheboldayev
- Succeeded by: Office abolished

Personal details
- Born: Vladimir Vasilyevich Ptukha; 6 April 1894 Oster, Chernigov Governorate, Russian Empire
- Died: 25 April 1938 (aged 44) Kommunarka shooting ground, Moscow, RSFSR, Soviet Union
- Party: CPSU (1917–1937)

Vladimir Vasilyevich Ptukha (Ukrainian: Володимир Васильович Птуха, Russian: Владимир Васильевич Птуха; 6 April [O.S. 25 March] 1894 – 25 April 1938) was a Soviet politician who served in various positions within the Communist Party of the Soviet Union including First Secretary of the Lower Volga Regional Committee of the Communist Party of the Soviet Union, First Secretary of the Stalingrad Regional Committee of the Communist Party of the Soviet Union, Second Secretary of the Far Eastern Regional Committee of the Communist Party of the Soviet Union. He was also a member of the NKVD troika.

== Early life and education ==
Vladimir Ptukha was born in Oster in the Chernigov Governorate of the Russian Empire on April 6, 1894. His older brother, Mikhail Ptukha was an economist and lawyer. Ptukha studied at the Petrograd Mining Institute and graduated in 1917.

== Political career ==
In April 1917, Ptukha joined the Bolshevik Party and returned to his hometown of Oster where he became a member of the Central Committee and Revolutionary Committee of the Russian Social Democratic Labour Party (b). From 1918 to 1919, he was a military commissar of a partisan detachment operating against the German Army. He then formed the 1st Cavalry Regiment of the Red Army in Ukraine and commanded it.

From 1919 to 1920, he served as the First Secretary of the Oster County Committee of the Communist Party of Ukraine and then served as the Deputy Chairman of the Chernihiv Provincial Executive Committee. He continued to work as instructors of Central Committees in the Ukrainian SSR and Russian SFSR. He also actively conducted collectivization.

Ptukha served as the First Secretary of the Stalingrad Provincial Committee of the Communist Party of the Soviet Union from 1927 to 1928 and then served as the Executive Secretary of the Stalingrad District Committee of the Communist Party of the Soviet Union. He was a delegate to the 15th Congress of the Communist Party of the Soviet Union and was elected a candidate member of the Central Committee of the Communist Party of the Soviet Union at the 16th Congress of the Communist Party of the Soviet Union.

In January 1931, he was appointed First Secretary of the Lower Volga Regional Committee of the Communist Party of the Soviet Union and worked in the position until 1934 when he became the First Secretary of the Stalingrad Regional Committee of the Communist Party of the Soviet Union. On February 9, 1934, Ptukha was reelected as a candidate member of Central Committee of the Communist Party of the Soviet Union at the 17th Congress of the Communist Party of the Soviet Union. From 1935 to September 13, 1937, he served as the Second Secretary of the Far Eastern Regional Committee of the Communist Party of the Soviet Union. It was around this time that Ptukha became a member of the NKVD troika and actively participated in Stalinist repressions and the Great Purge.

== Arrest and execution ==
On September 13, 1937, Ptukha was suddenly removed from his post of Second Secretary of the Far Eastern Regional Committee. He was then called to participate in the October plenary session of the Central Committee of the Communist Party of the Soviet Union in Moscow. Upon arrival on October 11, 1937, he was arrested and his membership within the Central Committee was revoked due to him being an "exposed enemy of the people". He was charged with espionage and secretly working for Japan. He was sentenced to execution on November 1, 1937, but for unknown reasons the execution was postponed for nearly six months. On April 25, 1938, the Military Collegium of the Supreme Court of the Soviet Union formally approved the sentence and Ptukha was executed by firing squad at the Kommunarka shooting ground.

He was rehabilitated on March 14, 1956.

== See also ==
- Great Purge
- Volgograd Regional Committee of the Communist Party of the Soviet Union
- Kommunarka
