= Ardatov =

Ardatov (Russian: Ардатов) is the name of several inhabited localities in Russia.

Urban localities

- Ardatov (town), Republic of Mordovia, a town in Ardatovsky District of Republic of Mordovia
- Ardatov, Nizhny Novgorod Oblast, a work settlement in Ardatovsky District of Nizhny Novgorod Oblast

Rural localities

- Ardatov (rural locality), Republic of Mordovia, a station settlement in Ardatovsky Selsoviet of Ardatovsky District of the Republic of Mordovia
