= Valerie Niehaus =

German actress (born 1974)

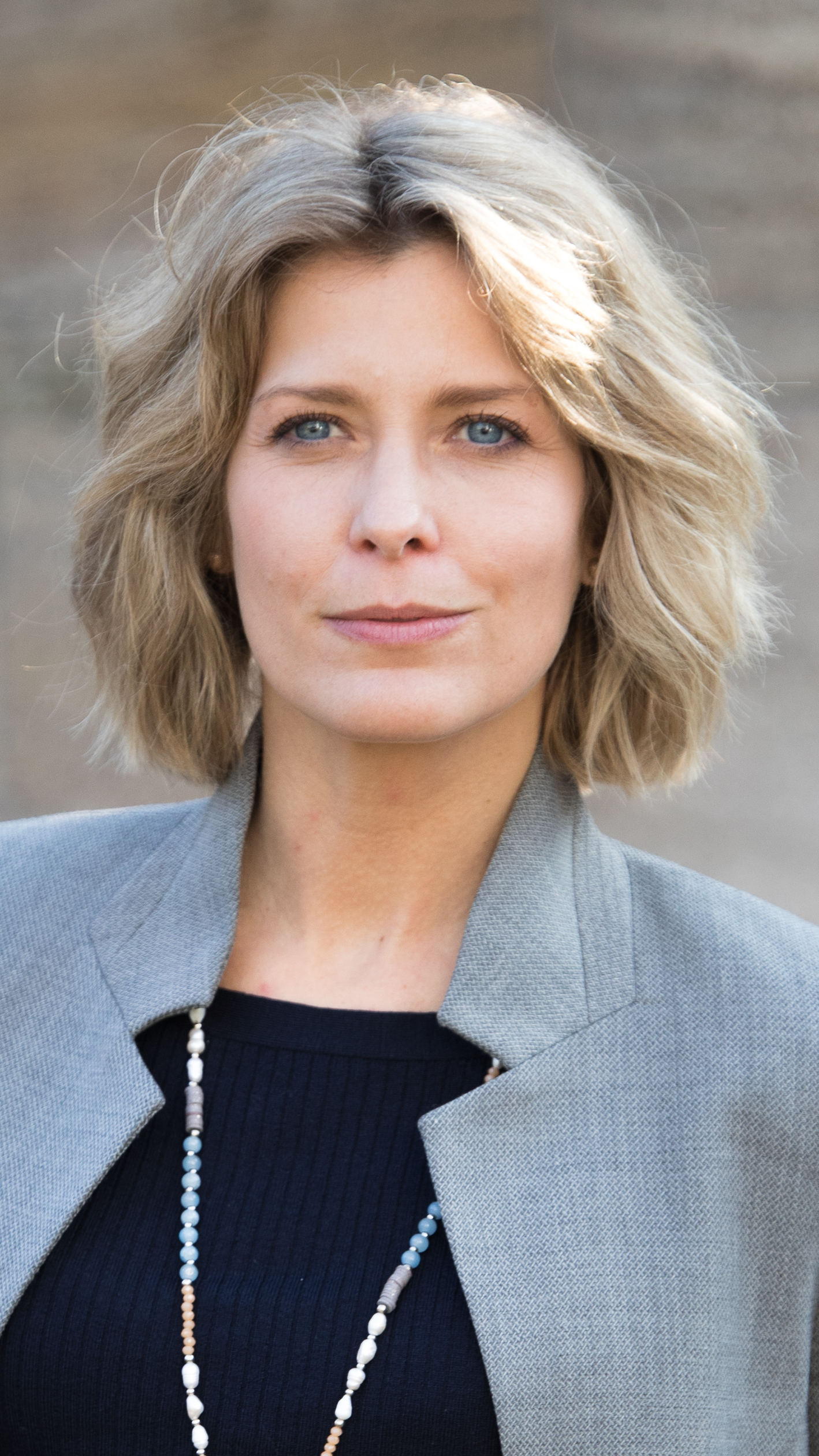
- Valerie Niehaus in 2018 at Berlin Film Festival
- Born: 11 October 1974 (age 52); Emsdetten, West Germany
- Education: Lee Strasberg Theatre Institute, New York City
- Occupation: Actress
- Years active: 1987–present
- Relatives: Ruth Niehaus (grandaunt)

Valerie Niehaus (born 11 October 1974) is a German actress.

== Early life ==
Valerie Niehaus grew up in Emsdetten where she went to the local primary school. After that she moved to Fulda and later to Berlin.

== Career ==
At the age of thirteen Niehaus made her first television appearance in the television series Rote Erde. She came to public prominence starring as Julia von Anstetten in Verbotene Liebe. In 1995 and 1996 Niehaus won the bronze Bravo Otto as female TV star. When she left Verbotene Liebe in 1997 Niehaus went to New York City to study acting at the Lee Strasberg Theatre Institute. She graduated in 1999. In 1998 Niehaus appeared in the movie St. Pauli Night.

In 2000 followed the movie Flashback. In 2001 she appeared in the TV film Love Crash. In 2002 she played Antonia Lenz in the comedy Der Duft des Geldes. In 2003 she portrayed Irina Burger in Cleaning Up. In 2006 Niehaus played the title role in the television series Alles über Anna. In 2008 Niehaus appeared in Ship of No Return: The Final Voyage of the Gustloff and Mogadischu. In 2009 Niehaus played the horse breeder Katherina Mohr in Tierisch Verliebt.

In 2010 she starred as the single mother Maja Nielsen in the TV movie Sind denn alle Männer Schweine?. In 2011 she played the first love of Udo Jürgens in The Man with the Bassoon. In the 2013 TV movie The Beautiful Spy Niehaus played the agent Vera von Schalburg who worked for the German defense at the beginning of World War II. In 2014 Valerie Niehaus played Lila in the comedy Frauenherzen. In the same year she appeared next to Uwe Ochsenknecht in the film Überleben an der Scheidungsfront.

Since 2018, she has worked as a correspondent on the heute show, a satirical news program shown on the German television channel ZDF.

== Personal life ==
Valerie Niehaus is a single mother. She lives in Berlin together with her son Joshua Elias. The German actress Ruth Niehaus is Niehaus's grandaunt.

== Filmography ==
- 1987: Rote Erde (TV series)
- 1995–1997: Verbotene Liebe (TV series, 408 episodes)
- 1997: Rosamunde Pilcher: Stunden der Entscheidung (TV film)
- 1999–2004: SOKO 5113 (TV series, 3 episodes)
- 1999: St. Pauli Night
- 2000: Die Gefesselten (TV film)
- 2000: Klinik unter Palmen (TV series, 3 episodes)
- 2000: Flashback
- 2001: Ein unmöglicher Mann (TV series)
- 2001: Vera Brühne (TV film)
- 2001: Das Glück ist eine Insel (TV film)
- 2001: Die Frau, die Freundin und der Vergewaltiger (TV film)
- 2001: Rex: A Cop's Best Friend: Tödlicher Test (TV series episode)
- 2001: Balko (TV series, 1 episode)
- 2002: Love Crash (TV film)
- 2002: Der Duft des Geldes (TV film)
- 2002: Königskinder (Short)
- 2003: Cleaning Up (TV film)
- 2004: Inga Lindström: Wind über den Schären (TV film)
- 2005: Full Throttle
- 2005–2011: Donna Leon (TV series, 2 episodes)
- 2006: Grimm Love
- 2006: Rose unter Dornen (TV film)
- 2006: Alles über Anna (TV series, 10 episodes)
- 2006: Beastly Male (Short)
- 2007: Mein alter Freund Fritz (TV film)
- 2007: Die Rettungsflieger (TV series, 1 episode)
- 2007: SOKO Rhein-Main (TV series, 1 episode)
- 2008: Ship of No Return: The Final Voyage of the Gustloff
- 2008: Mogadischu (TV film)
- 2008: Kommissar LaBréa – Tod an der Bastille (TV film)
- 2008: Unser Mann im Süden (TV series, 1 episode)
- 2009: Super Storm (TV film)
- 2009: Küstenwache (TV series, 1 Episode)
- 2009: Tierisch Verliebt (TV film)
- 2009: Stuttgart Homicide (TV series, 1 episode)
- 2009: Eine Liebe in St. Petersburg (TV film)
- 2009–2010: Der Landarzt (TV series, 6 episodes)
- 2009–2011: Doctor's Diary (TV series, 4 episodes)
- 2010: Kommissar LaBréa – Mord in der Rue St. Lazare (TV film)
- 2010: Kommissar LaBréa – Todesträume am Montparnasse (TV film)
- 2010: Sind denn alle Männer Schweine? (TV film)
- 2010: Die Liebe kommt mit dem Christkind (TV film)
- 2010: SOKO Wien (TV series, 1 episode)
- 2010: Garmischer Bergspitzen (TV film)
- 2010: SOKO Donau (SOKO Wien) – Tod eines Schnüfflers
- 2010: FunnyMovie (TV series, 1 episode)
- 2011: Biss zur großen Pause – Das Highschool Vampir Grusical
- 2011: Stolberg (TV series, 1 episode)
- 2011: Ausgerechnet Sex! (TV film)
- 2011: Rosa Roth (TV series, 1 episode)
- 2011: The Man with the Bassoon (TV film)
- 2011: The Great Comeback (TV film)
- 2012: Die Draufgänger (TV series, 1 episode)
- 2012: Überleben an der Wickelfront (TV film)
- 2012: Robot Mom (TV film)
- 2013: The Stalker (TV film)
- 2013: Mordshunger – Verbrechen und andere Delikatessen (TV series, 2 episodes)
- 2013: Kripo Holstein – Mord und Meer (TV series, 1 episode)
- 2013: Alarm für Cobra 11 (TV series, 1 episode)
- 2013: Herzensbrecher (TV series, 1 episode)
- 2013: The Beautiful Spy (TV film)
- 2014: Der Rücktritt (TV film)
- 2014: Frauenherzen (TV film)
- 2014: Schmidt – Chaos auf Rezept (TV series, 1 episode)
- 2015: Drunter & Brüder (TV film)
