= Anja Knauer =

German actress

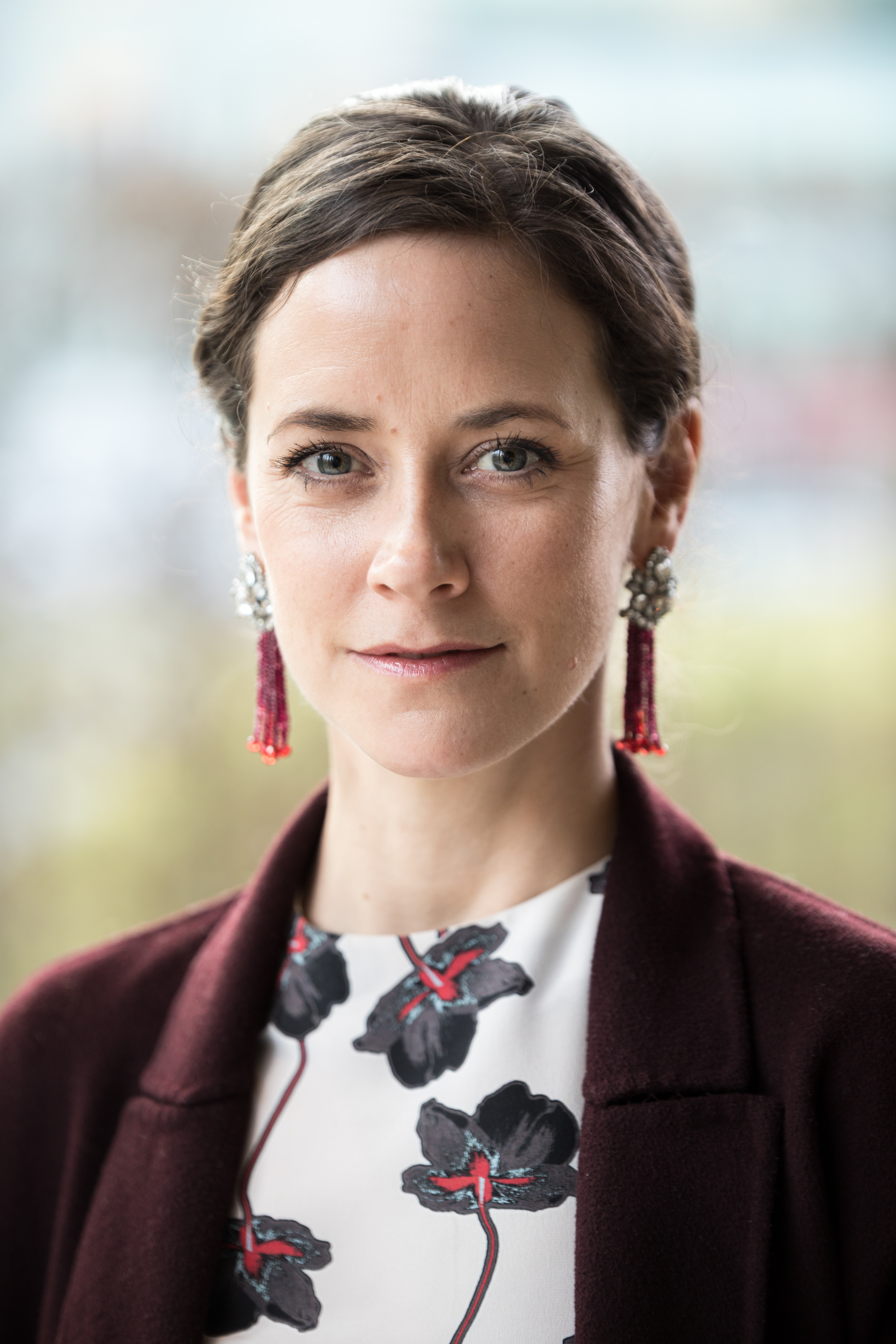
- Born: 18 March 1979 (age 47); Hamburg, West Germany
- Occupation: Actress
- Years active: 1995–present

Anja Knauer (born 18 March 1979) is a German actress who has played the leading female role in some German films.

== Early life ==
Knauer grew up in the Sasel quarter of the borough of Wandsbek with her younger brother, Tim. She joined a child modelling agency after being spoken to in the Alstertal-Einkaufszentrum, a shopping centre, when she was 15. After completing her abitur in Hamburg, Knauer studied film and literature at the Free University of Berlin. Anja's brother Tim also works as an actor, but is better known for his work as a voice dubbing artist.

== Acting ==
In 1996, when she was 17, Knauer gained her first role in Martin Gies's ZDF television film Kleine Einbrecher. The film Küss mich, Frosch, in which Knauer was the leading actress and played alongside Matthias Schweighöfer, won an Emil, a Goldener Spatz and an Erich Kästner-Fernsehpreis (for the screenplay), and was nominated for an Emmy Award.

== Design ==
Knauer works as a set designer, and has also worked on the design of rooms in the Michelberger Hotel in Berlin.

== Filmography ==
- 1998: SK Kölsch: Ein Mord kommt selten allein (TV series episode)
- 1998: Frühstück zu viert (TV film)
- 1999: Die Angst in meinem Herzen (TV film)
- 1999: Die Schule am See: Verliebt, verlobt, verheiratet (TV series episode)
- 1999: Im Namen des Gesetzes: Tot und begraben (TV series episode)
- 1999: SOS Baracuda: Der Mädchenjäger (TV series episode)
- 1999: Die Strandclique (TV series, 2 episodes)
- 1999: Klinikum Berlin Mitte – Leben in Bereitschaft (TV series)
- 2000: Küss mich, Frosch (TV film)
- 2000: Küstenwache: Tödliche Party (TV series episode)
- 2000: Alarm für Cobra 11 – Die Autobahnpolizei: Zwischen allen Stühlen (TV series episode)
- 2001: Lenya (TV film)
- 2001: Ein Fall für zwei: Verbotene Gefühle (TV series episode)
- 2002: Leipzig Homicide: Nervenkitzel (TV series episode)
- 2002: Annas Heimkehr (TV film)
- 2003: Wilde Jungs – Men in Blue (TV film)
- 2003: Unter weißen Segeln: Kompass der Liebe (TV series episode)
- 2003: Schlosshotel Orth: Volltreffer (TV series episode)
- 2003: Utta Danella: Plötzlich ist es Liebe (TV film)
- 2003: Inga Lindström: Wind über den Schären (TV film)
- 2004: Tsunami: Terror in the North Sea (TV film)
- 2004: This Far from Paradise (TV film)
- 2005: Auf ewig und einen Tag (TV film)
- 2006: Delire de negation (Short)
- 2006: Zepp (Short)
- 2006: Rosamunde Pilcher: Der Himmel über Cornwall (TV film)
- 2007: Hilfe, die Familie kommt! (TV film)
- 2007: Ein Fall für zwei: Schmutzige Hände (TV series episode)
- 2008: Ship of No Return: The Final Voyage of the Gustloff (TV film)
- 2008–2011: Open House (TV series, 5 episodes)
- 2009: Pfarrer Braun: Im Namen von Rose (TV series episode)
- 2009: Meine Tochter und der Millionär (TV film)
- 2009: Résiste – Aufstand der Praktikanten
- 2009: Ein starkes Team: Dschungelkampf (TV series episode)
- 2010: Kommissar LaBréa: Mord in der Rue St. Lazare (TV series episode)
- 2010: Kommissar LaBréa: Todesträume am Montparnasse (TV series episode)
- 2010: Familie Dr. Kleist: Nicht so einfach mit der Liebe (TV series episode)
- 2010: Doctor's Diary: Ja, ich will - Aber wer will mich? (TV series episode)
- 2011: Spreewaldkrimi: Die Tränen der Fische (TV series episode)
- 2011: Alarm für Cobra 11: In der Schusslinie (TV series episode)
- 2011: Der Sandmann (TV film)
- 2011: Die letzte Lüge
- 2011: Der Staatsanwalt: Schlangengrube (TV series episode)
- 2012: In aller Freundschaft: Magie (TV series episode)
- 2012: Der Landarzt: Entführt (TV series episode)
- 2012: SOKO Wismar: Hinter verschlossenen Türen (TV series episode)
- 2012: The White Horse Inn
- 2013: Tödliche Versuchung (TV film)
- 2013: Die Bergretter (TV series, 3 episodes)
- 2016: Gut zu Vögeln
- 2017: Inga Lindström: Liebesreigen in Samlund (TV film)
- 2018: Der Bergdoktor (episode: Lebensangst)
- 2018: SOKO München (episode: Die Verlorenen)
- 2019: Der Bulle und das Biest (episode: Das Chamäleon)
- 2019: Beck is back! (episode: Die Lehrerin)
- 2021: SOKO Köln (episode: Sühne)
- 2022: Billy Kuckuck – Mutterliebe
- 2023: Bettys Diagnose (episode: Helden und Vampire)
- 2023: Malibu – Schwesterherzen (TV series)
- 2023: Jenseits der Spree (episode: Einsam sterben)
- since 2023: Neue Geschichten vom Pumuckl (TV series)
- 2024: Ostfrieslandkrimis – Ostfriesenschwur (TV series)
- 2024: Das Signal (4 episodes)
- 2024: Wilsberg – Blinde Flecken
- 2025: Der Alte (episode: Alles weg)
- 2023: Sterben ist auch keine Lösung (TV film)
- 2025: Pumuckl und das große Missverständnis (cinema film)
- 2026: Extrawurst (cinema film)
