= Mikhail Ptukha =

Ukrainian statistician and demographer (1884–1961)

Mikhail Vasylovych Ptukha
- Миха́йло Васи́льович Пту́ха
- Born: November 7, 1884; Oster, Chernigov Governorate, Russian Empire
- Died: October 3, 1961 (aged 76); Kyiv, Kyiv Oblast, Ukrainian SSR, Soviet Union
- Resting place: Baikove Cemetery; 50.416667°N 30.505833°E
- Education: St. Petersburg University
- Scientific career
- Workplaces: St. Petersburg University; Perm State University; Demographic Institute of the Ukrainian Academy of Sciences; Ministry of Confessions

Mikhail Ptukha (also transliterated as Mykhailo Ptukha. Ukrainian: Миха́йло Васи́льович Пту́ха; Russian: Михаи́л Васи́льевич Пту́ха; 7 November 1884 – 3 October 1961) was a Ukrainian statistician and demographer. He most notably helped found the Demographic Institute of the Ukrainian Academy of Sciences, which he was the dean of from 1919 until 1938 following its liquidation.

Born in Oster in the Russian Empire Ptukha first started working in statistics during his years at the local gymnasium, working in the statistics section of the Chernihiv zemstvo bureau. In 1906 he entered the Faculty of Law at St. Petersburg University, where he graduated from in 1910, afterward studying abroad in Western Europe until 1914. In 1916 he defended his master's thesis, and in that same year, he began working for the newly created Perm University as a professor in political economy and statistics, which he did until the Russian Revolution. He moved back to Ukraine during the revolution, working as a professor at the Taras Shevchenko National University of Kyiv and the People's University of Ukraine. In 1919 he became the dean of the newly created Demographic Institute of the Ukrainian Academy of Sciences, and so in the 1920s he started working on collaborating the institute with the International Statistical Institute. During the Great Purge, he was arrested many times and eventually the institute was liquidated, which led him in 1940 to start working at the Department of Statistics of the Institute of Economics and become the Department of Social Sciences. He officially retired in 1950, although he continued to do statistical work until his death in 1961.

== Early life ==
Ptukha was born on 7 November 1884 in Oster, then part of the Chernigov Governorate in the Russian Empire at the time of his birth. His father was a clerk of the district's zemstvo administration, and Ptukha himself was the second child out of eight children in the family. He first graduated from the Oster two-class gymnasium in 1898. During the summers of his years at the gymnasium, he worked for the statistics section of the Chernihiv zemstvo bureau, where his father worked at. In 1904 he passed the exam for the certificate of maturity at the Novorossiysk gymnasium, but upon trying to enter the St. Petersburg University he was denied. In 1906, however, he was allowed the enter the Faculty of Law in the university after completing an additional exam in Latin in November. In 1910 he graduated from the university with a diploma in the first degree.

After studying at St. Petersburg, he studied abroad in Berlin from 1910 to 1912, but returned briefly in 1913 to teach statistics at his alma mater. During that year in 1913 he was a Privatdozent as an associate to Alexander A. Kaufman's classes in statistics. He returned to studying abroad in 1914, going to London for a year to complete his master's thesis. In 1916 he defended his master's dissertation under Mikhail Nikolaevich Gernet on population statistics and moral statistics.

== Work in demographics ==
Upon the opening of the Perm branch of Petrograd University, he was sent to organize the teaching of statistics there in 1916 and in July 1917 was approved as an acting professor of political economy and statistics at the now Perm University. After the October Revolution in Russia, he used his one-year business trip granted by Perm to go back to Kyiv in the summer in 1918, where he stayed. After going there, he became the head of the Statistical Department at the Ministry of Confessions, starting teaching statistics at the People's University of Ukraine, and also became a professor at Taras Shevchenko National University of Kyiv. In January 1919 he was approached to become the dean of the newly-created Demographic Institute of the Ukrainian Academy of Sciences, to which he accepted. During the 1920s he became secretary of the Socio-Economic Department of the national academy, during which time he collaborated with the International Statistical Institute (ISI), attending as a delegation to the USSR about the ISI.

In January 1930, after the question of whether statistics was a "class science" was raised, Ptukha faced public harassment after opposing Marxists. In the subsequent years, during the mid 1930s, he was arrested multiple times by the Soviet authorities. In 1933, he started focusing his research on the history of statistics, which he did up until his death. He was arrested first in 1934, and was last arrested in 1938 for sabotage in the Institute of Demography but was released due to lack of evidence. After his arrest in 1938, the Institute of Demography was liquidated due to its supposed connection with sabotage.

In 1940, two years after the institute's liquidation, he started heading the Department of Statistics of the Institute of Economics of the Academy of Sciences of the Ukrainian SSR. In addition, starting in 1944, he became head of the Department of Social Sciences and a member of the presidium of the Academy of Sciences. He also published his first study about the history of statistics, which he had been studying in 1933, with an essay on the history of statistics during the XVII-XVIII centuries, notably dealing with William Petty. However, he would not continue his work for long, and in 1950 he retired while remaining as a member of the ISI. He was also still a scientific consultant of the Central Statistical Office of the USSR and helped prepare the All-Union Population Census of 1959, and focused on studying the problems of the All-Union population censuses.

== Death ==
Ptukha died on 3 October 1961 in Kyiv. Following his death he was buried at Baikove Cemetery.

== Honours and awards ==
In 1997 the National Academy of Sciences of Ukraine started awarding the "Mykhailo Ptukha Prize" for outstanding works in the field of demographic statistics. The Institute of Demographics, where he was the dean of from 1919 to 1938, was re-named in his honour as the Institute of Demography and Social Research named after M. V. Ptukha of the National Academy of Sciences of Ukraine. He was also awarded the following during his lifetime:

- Honoured Scientist of Ukraine - 1944
- Order of the Red Banner of Labour
- Order of the Badge of Honour
