= Extrawurst (film) =

- Directed by: Marcus H. Rosenmüller
- Screenplay by: Dietmar Jacobs; Moritz Netenjakob
- Based on: Extrawurst by: Dietmar Jacobs; Moritz Netenjakob
- Produced by: Annalena Frieling
- Starring: Hape Kerkeling; Christoph Maria Herbst; Fahri Yardım; Anja Knauer
- Cinematography: Daniel Gottschalk
- Edited by: Andrea Mertens
- Music by: Gerd Baumann
- Release date: 15 January 2026 (Germany)
- Running time: 100 minutes
- Country: Germany
- Language: German

Extrawurst, also known as The Holy Grill in English, is a German feature film directed by Marcus H. Rosenmüller. It is a film adaptation of the stage play of the same name by Dietmar Jacobs and Moritz Netenjakob. The film was released in cinemas on 15 January 2026.

The plot of the film revolves around a small town tennis club AGM, with club's harmony increasingly disrupted due to a debate regarding a planned purchase of a new barbecue grill.

The film explores themes of integration of immigrants, leitkultur, treatment of minorities, and eventually also sexual identity and toxic masculinity.

== Plot ==
In the small German town of Lengenheide, the local tennis club holds its AGM. After the chairman, Heribert, presents the members with a fait accompli regarding playing attire and the new clubhouse building, he also intends to keep the vote on the purchase of a new barbecue brief. However, Melanie who recently became a district champion in mixed doubles with her Turkish-German partner Erol, triggers a discussion about whether a separate barbecue should be purchased for their Muslim club member. Erol absolutely does not want this, although he does point out that the Sucuk his family eats at club celebrations does, in fact, have to be grilled separately according to Muslim dietary laws. In the end, the following club members split off to settle the matter among themselves:

- Heribert: The club chairman for 25 years now, he has developed authoritarian tendencies in his role and always wants to remain the decision-maker. He finds the mere emergence of the discussion fundamentally objectionable. In order to keep the peace, he tries to act in a solution-oriented way (as he sees it), but this invariably provokes the displeasure of one side or the other. In a knee-jerk reaction, he therefore resigns from his club post, only to reverse this later.
- Matthias: The deputy chairman is an adherent of a German leitkultur, expects the minority to adapt to it, and embodies the cliché of rural, socially backward petty-bourgeois attitudes. Personally, he also harbours a dislike of Heribert, since Matthias is evidently a very committed club member (and also a sponsor, as evidenced by his advertising banners on the grounds), yet is constantly sidelined by the chairman and his club work goes unappreciated.
- Torsten: A newcomer to Lengenheide from Berlin with his wife Melanie, he always represents the exact opposite of Matthias in his views, embodying the exaggerated caricature of the modern city dweller: an atheist, a vegetarian, condescendingly politically correct, and quick to throw accusations of "brown or blue poltical persuations". He clings noticeably to his wife, having worked himself into the idea that Erol is a rival. Over the course of the discussion, he reveals that he rejects Islam even more than other religions, deeming it particularly backward on questions of gender equality.
- Erol: Born in Germany and raised in Lengenheide, having sat at the same school desk as Matthias and emphasising his German citizenship, he does not want the attention directed at him at all. At first he is embarrassed, but reacts with increasing provocation, especially when his old classmate refers to his origins. He visibly suffers from the fact that, despite his long membership in the club, he is still perceived as a foreigner (as "the Turk") in his hometown. Later, however, he also becomes increasingly critical of German integration policy and of the refusal to integrate shown by many Muslims who came to Germany in particular since the 2015 migrant crisis, saying that this has brought him into disrepute as well.
- Melanie: The club's best player, she moved to Lengenheide with her husband Torsten only two years ago. Cultural consideration for minorities and a different form of social coexistence are evidently familiar to her from her Berlin home, so she tries to integrate similar developments into the rural environment as well. She ultimately accuses her discussion partners of the fact that most of humanity's problems have been caused by male ignorance and posturing, and that a world run by women would look better, attribututing the present discussion to this as well. Because she, as a member of the majority, stands up for the existing minority while herself belonging to the sex that was oppressed for centuries, she feels morally superior to her counterparts.

When the discussion spreads to the other members through overheard fragments of sentences, they too become embroiled in heated debates about social developments. One by one, more and more of them leave the assembly, and the club threatens to fall apart. When a chain reaction breaks out on the outskirts of the club grounds, at the end of which Heribert lies unconscious on the ground and has to be rescued by the caretaker, Hans-Günther, everyone is finally reconciled. But when it is pointed out that board member Anne identifies as non-binary and the question of a third toilet therefore needs to be resolved, the good cheer evaporates immediately.

== Cast ==
- Hape Kerkeling as Heribert Bräsemann
- Christoph Maria Herbst as Torsten Pfaff
- Fahri Yardım as Erol Oturan
- Anja Knauer as Melanie Pfaff
- Friedrich Mücke as Matthias Scholz
- Gaby Dohm as Elisabeth Scholz
- Milan Peschel as Hans-Günther Schnippering
- Katrin Röver as Anne Ackermeier
- Patrick Joswig as Heinz Grumberger
- Malene Becker as Sabine Stortz
- Andreas Windhuis as Peter Lohr
- Rona Regjepi as Antonia Stortz
- Marlene Markt as Laura Zopf

== Reception ==
The film was received favourably to positively by the critics.

The Lexikon des Internationalen Films awarded 3.5 out of 5 stars and praises the excellently cast ensemble, which "runs at full throttle" in a "delightfully thought-provoking satire".

Josef Grübl notes in the Süddeutsche Zeitung that the film puts one in a "surprisingly good mood". While the film's "theatricality" is evident and much of it is predictable, it is also entertaining. Rosenmüller's sure "feel for punchlines" is also mentioned. The review ends with an adapted quote from the film: "But as long as someone can still laugh about it, it is not too late."

== Filming and premiere ==
The film was shot from 14 April 2025 to 28 May 2025, mainly at the grounds of sports club RTHC Bayer Leverkusen in Leverkusen, North Rhine-Westphalia. The film's German premiere took place on 7 January 2026 in Essen, with a further premiere for Munich the following day at the Mathäser Filmpalast.
