= Gaby Dohm =

German actress (born 1943)

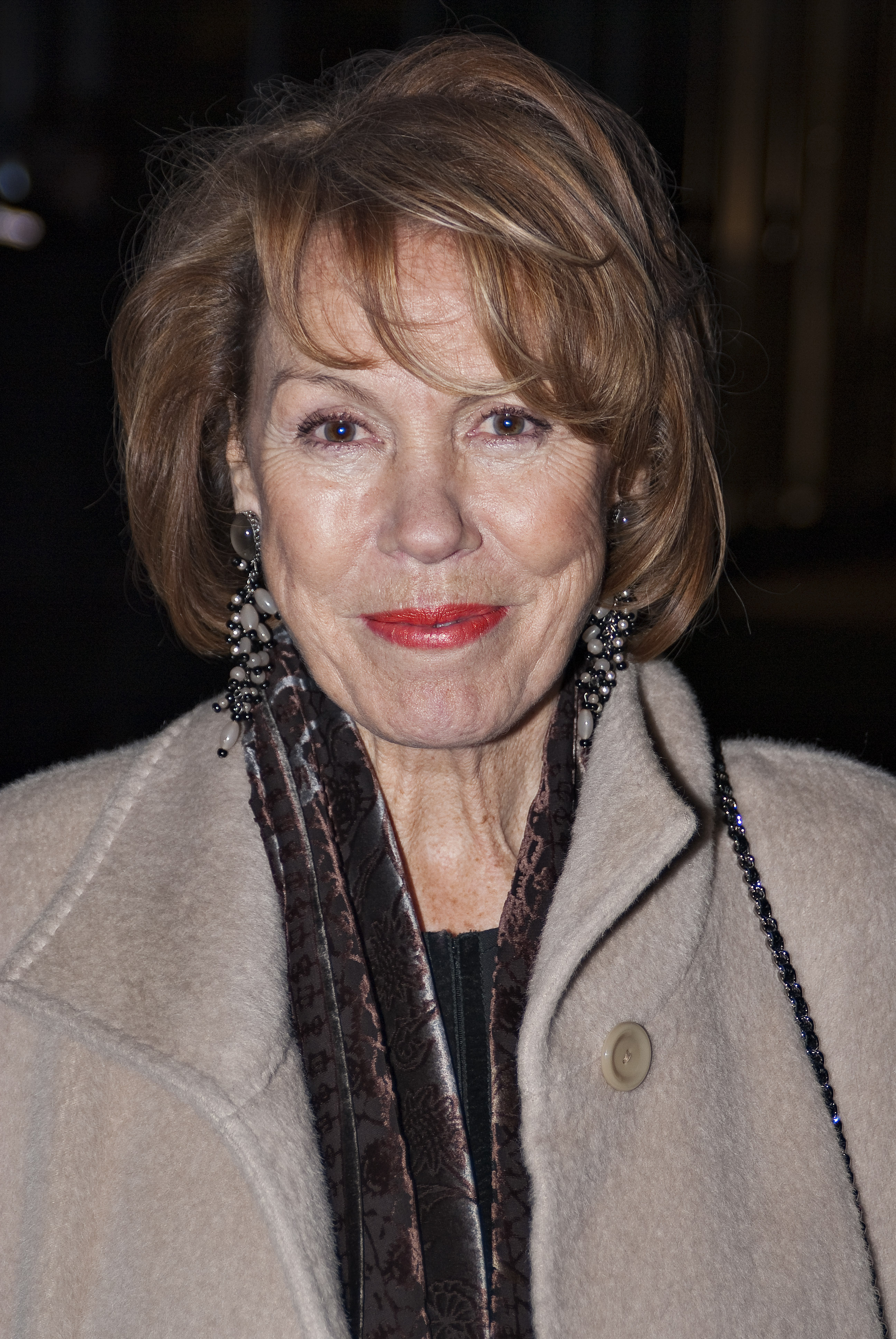
- Gaby Dohm in 2009
- Born: 23 September 1943 (age 83); Salzburg, Nazi Germany
- Occupation: Film actor
- Years active: 1964–present
- Parents: Will Dohm; Heli Finkenzeller

Gaby Dohm (born 23 September 1943 in Salzburg) is a German actress. She is the daughter of actor Will Dohm and actress Heli Finkenzeller.

== Selected filmography ==
- When Mother Went on Strike (1974)
- The Serpent's Egg (1977)
- Doctor Faustus (1982)
- The Black Forest Clinic (1985–1989, TV series)
- Rosenstrasse (2003)
- Extrawurst (2026)
