= Ruth Niehaus =

German actress

- Born: Ruth Hildegard Rosemarie Niehaus; 11 July 1925; Krefeld, Germany
- Died: 24 September 1994 (aged 69); Hamburg, Germany
- Occupation: Actress
- Years active: 1948–1994
- Spouse: Ivar Lissner
- Children: Imogen Jochem
- Relatives: Valerie Niehaus (grandniece)

Ruth Hildegard Rosemarie Niehaus (1925–1994) was a German stage and film actress.

She was married to Jewish German spy Ivar Lissner.

== Filmography ==
Year	Title	Role	Notes
1951	The House in Montevideo	Atlanta Nägler, Tochter	
1951	A Heidelberg Romance	Gabriele Attendorf	
1952	Roses Bloom on the Moorland	Dorothee Aden	
1953	No Way Back	Anna Brückner	
1954	The Beginning Was Sin	Rosalie	
1955	Love's Carnival	Anna Krüger	
1956	Studentin Helene Willfüer	Helene Willfüer	
1958	Resurrection	Missy	
1959	Cavalcade	Juanita	
1967	Tränen trocknet der Wind		
1980	Fabian	Ruth Relter	
1989	Hard Days, Hard Nights		

== Bibliography ==
- Von Moltke, Johannes. No Place Like Home: Locations Of Heimat In German Cinema. University of California Press, 2005.
