= Gut zu Vögeln =

2016 German romantic comedy film

- German theatrical poster
- Directed by: Mira Thiel
- Written by: Mira Thiel; Judith Bonesky; Friederich Oetker
- Starring: Anja Knauer; Max von Thun
- Music by: Riad Abdel-Nabi
- Distributed by: Constantin Film
- Release date: 14 January 2016
- Country: Germany
- Language: German

Gut zu Vögeln is a German romantic comedy film directed by Mira Thiel and starring Anja Knauer and Max von Thun. Advertised as "an anti-romantic comedy", it was released in Germany on 14 January 2016.

The film's title is a sexual pun: in German, "Gut zu" means "good to", "Vögeln" means "birds", but the unisonous "vögeln" is a colloquialism for having coitus.

== Plot ==
Merlin is a young society reporter whose fiancé cancels their wedding shortly before the big day. Devastated, she lets her friends convince her to move into her brother's old room in a flat with two men, Jacob and Nuri. As she struggles to rebuild her life in the aftermath of the breakup, Jacob, a womanizing bartender with attachment issues, begins to coach her in the art of "short-term relationships". When the guys go on a trip to Mallorca, Merlin and her brother's pregnant girlfriend, Clara, decide to follow them and chaos ensues.

== Cast ==
- Anja Knauer as Merlin
- Max von Thun as Jacob
- Max Giermann as Simon
- Katharina Schlothauer as Clara
- Samy Challah as Nuri
- Ulrich Gebauer as Lillith
- Kai Wiesinger as Tillmann
- Christian Tramitz as Lord Bradbory
- Oliver Kalkofe as Dr. Adam
- Jochen Nickel as Gunnar
- Sonja Kirchberger as Sonja
- Joyce Ilg as Hannah
- Birte Glang as Nessi
- Anna Julia Kapfelsperger as Sue
- Hasan Ali Mete as Nuri's Dad
- Özay Fecht as Nuri's Mom
- Markus Knüfken as J.T.
- Susan Sideropoulos as Sandy
- Megan Gay as Jil Hagen
- Frederic Heidorn as Hulk
- Livia Matthes as Maja
- Lotto King Karl as DJ Holger

Jürgen Vogel has an uncredited cameo appearance in the film.

== Production ==
Gut zu Vögeln was produced by Viafilm in cooperation with Rat Pack Filmproduktion and Constantin Film Produktion.

The script was co-written by director Mira Thiel and her friend Judith Bonesky, based on their experiences as roommates in a student flat. The titular sexual pun was pinned on their refrigerator.

A first official trailer was released in mid-October 2015.
