= Love's Carnival (1955 film) =

1955 film

- Directed by: Willy Birgel
- Written by: Otto Erich Hartleben (play); Heinz-Werner John; Georg C. Klaren
- Produced by: Alfred Kirschner
- Starring: Ruth Niehaus; Dietmar Schönherr; Elma Karlowa
- Cinematography: Georg Bruckbauer; Bruno Stephan
- Edited by: Anneliese Artelt
- Music by: Bert Grund
- Production company: Deutsche Mondial Film
- Distributed by: Gloria Film
- Release date: 6 October 1955
- Running time: 97 minutes
- Country: West Germany
- Language: German

Love's Carnival (German: Rosenmontag) is a 1955 West German historical drama film directed by Willy Birgel and starring Ruth Niehaus, Dietmar Schönherr and Elma Karlowa. It was shot at the Wiesbaden Studios and on location in Baden-Baden and Rastatt. The film's sets were designed by the art directors Fritz Maurischat and Theo Zwierski.

== Cast ==
- Ruth Niehaus as Anna Krüger
- Dietmar Schönherr as Leutnant Hans Rudloff
- Elma Karlowa as Ingeborg Wagner
- Willy Birgel as Georg von Grobitzsch
- Heinrich Gretler as Heinrich Krüger
- Rolf Kutschera as Viktor von Ramberg
- Friedrich Domin as Kommerzienrat Wagner
- Gerty Godden as Ottilie, Haushälterin
- Maria Krahn as Frau Kraft, Blumenbinderei
- Reinhard Glemnitz as Leutnant Harald Hofmann
- Hans Zesch-Ballot as Oberstleutnant Wilhelm von Friese
- Claudia Gerstäcker as Emma, Küchenmädchen
- Petra Unkel as Helmine, Blumenbinderin
- Heinz Peter Scholz as Leutnant Paul von Ramberg
- Michael Burk as Emil, Bursche bei Leutnant Radloff
- Rudolf Rhomberg as Wirt
- Kurt Großkurth as Nachtportier

== See also ==
- Rosenmontag (1924)
- Love's Carnival (1930)

== Bibliography ==
- Knop, Matthias. Rote Rosen und weisser Flieder: die Blütezeit der Filmstadt Wiesbaden. Museum Wiesbaden, 1995.
- Parish, Robert. Film Actors Guide. Scarecrow Press, 1977.
