= Aleksey Chuyanov =

Soviet politician (1905–1977)

- Алексей Чуянов
- Chuyanov in 1942 during the Battle of Stalingrad

First Secretary of the Stalingrad Regional Committee of the Communist Party of the Soviet Union
- In office 22 June 1938 – 6 December 1946
- Preceded by: Pyotr Smorodin
- Succeeded by: Vasily Prokhvatilov

Personal details
- Born: Aleksey Semenovich Chuyanov; 30 March 1905 Temryuk, Kuban Oblast, Russian Empire
- Died: 20 February 1977 (aged 71) Moscow, Russian SFSR, Soviet Union
- Citizenship: Soviet Union
- Party: Communist Party of the Soviet Union (1925–1977)
- Awards: Order of Lenin Order of the October Revolution Order of the Red Banner of Labour Medal "For the Defence of Stalingrad"

Aleksey Semenovich Chuyanov (Russian: Алексей Семёнович Чуянов; 30 March 1905 – 20 February 1977) was a Soviet politician who served as the First Secretary of the Stalingrad Regional Committee of the Communist Party of the Soviet Union from 1938 to 1946.

== Early life and education ==
Chuyanov was born on March 30, 1905, in the Temryuk in the Russian Empire. At the age of thirteen, he began working as a shepherd, farmer, and fisherman in Kuban. He graduated from the Moscow Chemical-Technological Institute of the Meat Industry in 1937, he also briefly worked as a mechanical engineer from 1934 to 1936.

== Political career ==
Chuyanov joined the Communist Party of the Soviet Union in 1925 and worked as the head of the Department of Agitation and Propaganda, and the First Secretary of numerous district committees of the Komsomol until 1927. He continued to work in various positions from 1927 to 1929.

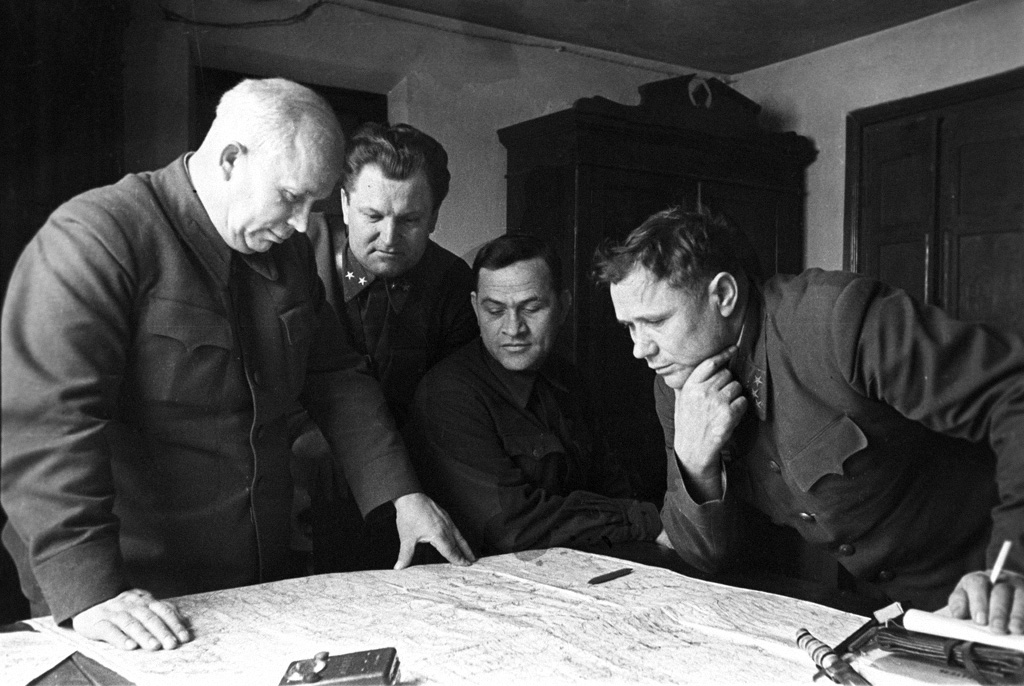
(From left to right) First Secretary of the Communist Party of Ukraine Nikita Khrushchev, Major General Alexei Kirichenko, First Secretary of the Stalingrad Regional Committee of the Communist Party of the Soviet Union Aleksey Chuyanov, and Commander of the Stalingrad Front General Andrey Yeryomenko in Stalingrad on December 1, 1942

From 1937 to 1938, he worked as the Instructor of the Department of Leading Party Workers of the Central Committee of the Communist Party of the Soviet Union. He then served as the First Secretary of the Stalingrad Regional Committee of the Communist Party of the Soviet Union from June 22, 1938, to December 6, 1946. Chuyanov's transfer to Stalingrad took place at the height of the Great Purge. He reviewed a list of supposed counter-revolutionaries who had been arrested by the local NKVD, concluded that there was a lack of evidence against them, and managed to obtain releases for all the victims. The local NKVD section tried to block this by contacting the Central Committee, but Georgy Malenkov decided to trust Chuyanov's decision.

Chuyanov went on to serve as a candidate member of the Central Committee of the Communist Party of the Soviet Union from 1939 to 1952 and a deputy to the Supreme Soviet of the Soviet Union from 1941 to 1950. He also served as the Chairman of the Stalingrad City Defense Committee from 1941 to 1943 during the Great Patriotic War. He was a member of the Military Council of the Stalingrad Front, Don Front, and Southern Front from 1942 to 1943.

During the Battle of Stalingrad, Chuyanov dealt with of the rear, as well as the reorganization of production for the needs of the front. With his assistance, work was clearly organized for the production of T-34 tanks and other military equipment, the preparation and processing of agricultural products, as well as the work of enterprises for the repair of equipment. Under Chuyanov's leadership, the Stalingrad Regional Committee formed People's Militias, Workers' Self-Defense Units, and plans for how to evacuate citizens and valuable government items from Stalingrad.

After serving as the First Secretary of the Stalingrad Committee, Chuyanov began working as the Head of the Main Directorate for Industrial and Consumer Cooperation under the Council of Ministers of the Soviet Union from 1946 to 1955. From 1955 to 1960, he worked in the State Committee for Labor and Wages of the Council of Ministers of the Soviet Union.

On May 4, 1970, by the decision of the Volgograd City Council of Workers' Deputies, Chuyanov was awarded the title of Honorary Citizen of the Hero City of Volgograd for "special merits shown in the defense of the city and the defeat of Nazi troops in the Battle of Stalingrad."

== Death ==
Aleksey Chuyanov died on February 20, 1977, in Moscow. He was buried at Mamayev Kurgan.

== Awards ==
- (Soviet Union) Order of Lenin (February 1942)
- (Soviet Union) Order of the October Revolution (March 28, 1975)
- (Soviet Union) Order of the Red Banner of Labour
- (Soviet Union) Medal "For the Defence of Stalingrad"
- (Soviet Union) Medal "For Valiant Labour in the Great Patriotic War 1941-1945"
- (Soviet Union) Honorary Citizen of the Hero City of Volgograd (May 4, 1970)

== Gallery ==
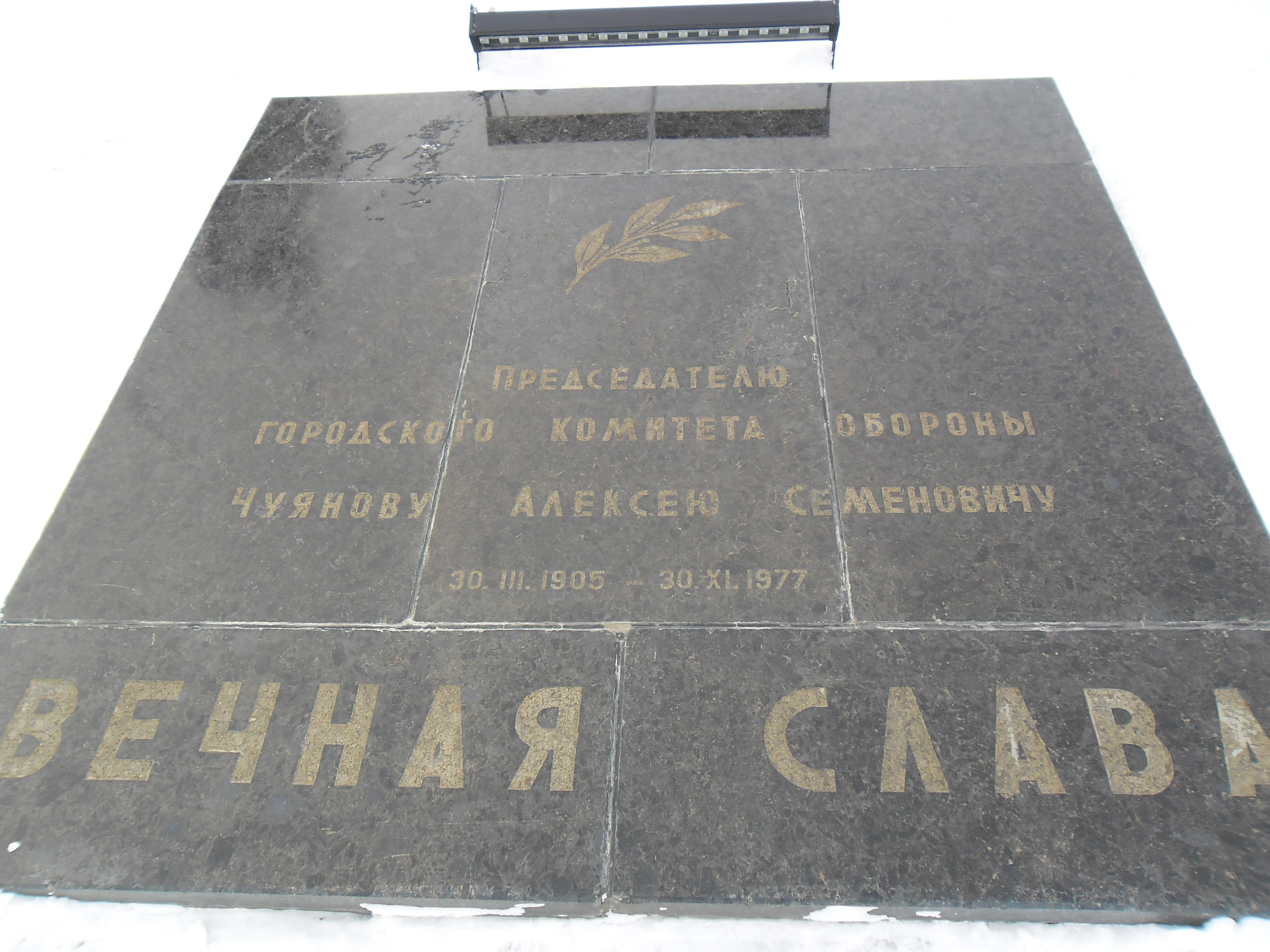
Chuyanov's tombstone

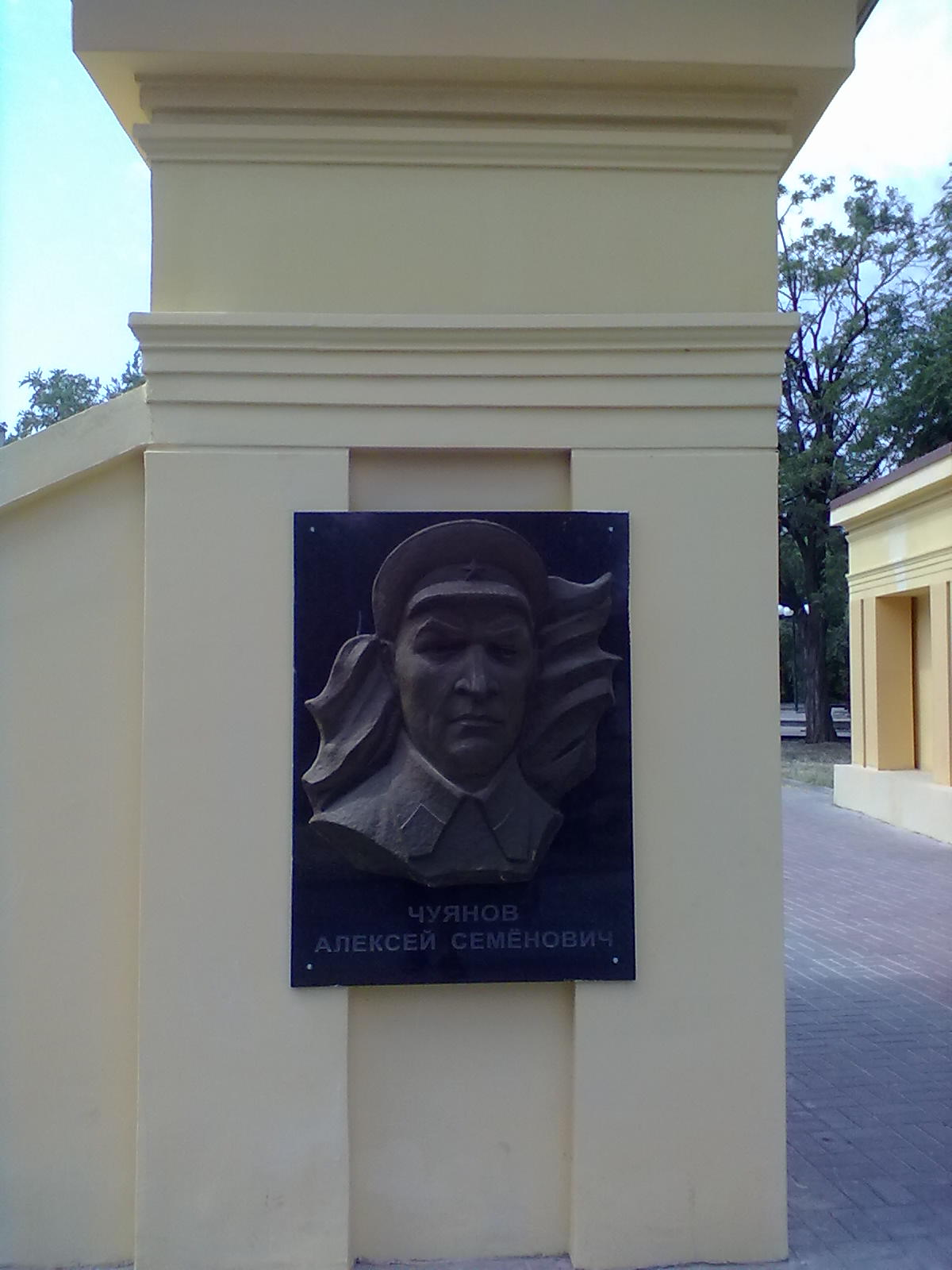
Memorial plaque of Aleksey Chuyanov on the Stalingrad GKO bunker

== See also ==
- Volgograd Regional Committee of the Communist Party of the Soviet Union
- Battle of Stalingrad
