= The Beautiful Spy =

2013 film

- Soundtrack cover
- Screenplay by: Annette Hess
- Directed by: Miguel Alexandre
- Starring: Valerie Niehaus; Fritz Karl; Jochen Nickel; Ron Donachie; Noah Huntley
- Music by: Nic Raine
- Country of origin: Germany
- Original language: German

Production
- Executive producer: Katja Kirchen
- Editor: Marcel Peragine
- Running time: 104 minutes

Original release
- Release: 27 December 2013

The Beautiful Spy (German: Die Spionin) is a 2013 historical-thriller television film set in Nazi Germany shortly before the outbreak of World War II inspired by the few facts known about Vera von Schalburg.

== Plot ==
Vera von Schalburg (portrayed by Valerie Niehaus) is a German prostitute working in Nazi Germany. In 1938, one year before the outbreak of World War II, Schalburg is arrested by the Berlin police. She is offered to work as a spy for the Abwehr, the German military intelligence service, instead of facing jail time. Completely unaware of the secret war preparations being conducted by her government, and unwilling to leave her teenage son who later joins the Hitler Youth, she accepts the offer.

She quickly meets and befriends Wilhelm Canaris (portrayed by Peter Prager), chief of the Abwehr, and is selected for a top-secret mission to Great Britain. When Schalburg learns of innocent Polish civilians being killed on mass in German-occupied Poland, she wants to leave. To prevent this, Abwehr agents led by Walther Luthmann (portrayed by Jochen Nickel) kidnaps her son, but Schalburg manages to track him down and go into hiding with him.

Realizing that Germany has lost the war, Schalburg moves to farm far away from the fighting with a male friend who becomes a sort of foster father for her son. Even though the war is long over by now, Luthmann, after confronting Schalburg at the farm, kills her for betraying the Abwehr during the war while in disguise as a common civilian.

== Soundtrack ==
The musical score was written by British composer, conductor and orchestrator Nic Raine.

1. Vision 01:54
2. Corridor/Washroom/Disposal 02:43
3. Cocktails 01:03
4. Work For Us/You'll Hear From Us/Already Enlisted 04:18
5. Their Flat 01:59
6. Wenneman/The Plan/Wenneman Taken 07:35
7. Gestapo/Change Of Plan/London 04:42
8. Transmission/Assignations/Workplace 04:47
9. Capture/The Gallows 03:15
10. At Last 04:13
11. I'm Sorry 02:17
12. Snatched/Car Crash/Aftermath 04:56
13. Landing 02:53
14. Travelling/Finding Christian 03:44
15. Retribution 03:42
16. Epilogue 07:12

== See also ==
- List of World War II TV series
- List of World War II films
