= Traumfrauen =

- Theatrical release poster
- Directed by: Anika Decker
- Written by: Anika Decker
- Produced by: Lothar Hellinger; Christopher Doll
- Starring: Hannah Herzsprung; Karoline Herfurth
- Cinematography: Andreas Berger
- Edited by: Charles Ladmiral
- Music by: Christoph Bauss; Fridolin Walcher; Jean-Christoph Ritter; Michael Geldreich
- Production companies: Decker Bros. Hellinger / Doll Filmproduktion; Warner Bros. Film Productions Germany
- Distributed by: Warner Bros. Pictures
- Release date: 19 February 2015 (Germany)
- Running time: 109 minutes
- Country: Germany
- Language: German
- Box office: $14.4 million (Germany)

Traumfrauen (English title: Man of My Dreams) is a 2015 German comedy film written and directed by Anika Decker. It sold 1.7 million tickets making it one of the most successful German films of 2015.

== Cast ==
- Hannah Herzsprung - Leni Reimann
- Karoline Herfurth - Hannah Reimann
- Palina Rojinski - Vivienne
- Iris Berben - Margaux Reimann
- Elyas M'Barek - Joseph
- Frederick Lau - Peter Müller
- Doron Amit - Guy Cohen
- Friedrich von Thun - Carl Reimann
- Margarita Broich - Gundula
- Max von Thun - Constantin
- Dejan Bucin - Philipp
- Nina Proll - Birte Schottenhammel
- Alexander Schubert - Dr. Hengesbach
- Nic Romm - Dr. Hennig
