= Vera Schalburg =

Soviet, German and British agent (1914-1946)

Vera Schalburg (23 November 1914 in Siberia – 8 February 1946 in Hamburg) was a Soviet, German and British agent and sister of Christian Frederik von Schalburg.

== Biography ==
Schalburg lived in Paris, where she made a living as a dancer. There she was recruited by the Abwehr and sent to England in 1938. Her older brother C. F. Von Schalburg was not pleased and believed that it would hurt his reputation and that of his party, the DNSAP, if it became known that she had been both in German and Soviet service. In May 1939 he therefore brought up the issue with Renthe-Fink, a German diplomat in Denmark, who arranged for Vera's recall from London.

She continued as an agent for the Abwehr in Copenhagen until the night of 30 September 1940, where she was sent from Stavanger by seaplane and rubber raft to the Scottish coast near Buckie. She and two other agents, Karl Theodor Drücke and Werner Waelti, landed on the northeast coast of Scotland (Operation Lena). Under her code-name Vera Erikson, she soon caught the attention of the Scottish police. She and her two companions were arrested at Portgordon as they tried to buy a train ticket to London. She was supposed to return to London as hostess for a fashionable tea salon in Mayfair, attended by key politicians. However, the three agents were quickly arrested and Drücke and Waelti were convicted of espionage and hanged in the Wandsworth Prison.

Vera Schalburg survived by becoming an agent for the British. She was first taught by Klop Ustinov of MI5 and then sent to Isle of Wight to spy on prisoners taken by Britain, while herself pretending to be a prisoner.

== Death ==
Returning to Germany after the war, Schalburg died, under the name of Vera von Wedel, from pneumonia on 8 February 1946 at the Marienkrankenhaus hospital in Hamburg, aged 31. She was buried in the Ohlsdorf Cemetery. The grave, paid for by Ernst Bodo von Zitzewitz, a former Hamburg Abwehr officer.

== Portrayal in the media ==
- In the 2013 German TV production The Beautiful Spy, Vera von [sic] Schalburg is portrayed by Valerie Niehaus.

== Sources and references ==
- Main source: Andersen, Kirstine Kloster (2018). Spurven, den dramatiske historie om spionen Vera Schalburg [The Sparrow, the dramatic history of the spy Vera Schalburg.]. Lindhardt og Ringhof, Egmont Group. Copenhagen. ISBN 978-8711912591. OCLC 1098170790.
- “The Beautiful Spy”, David Tremain, The History Press, 2019
