= Max von Thun =

German-Austrian actor (born 1977)

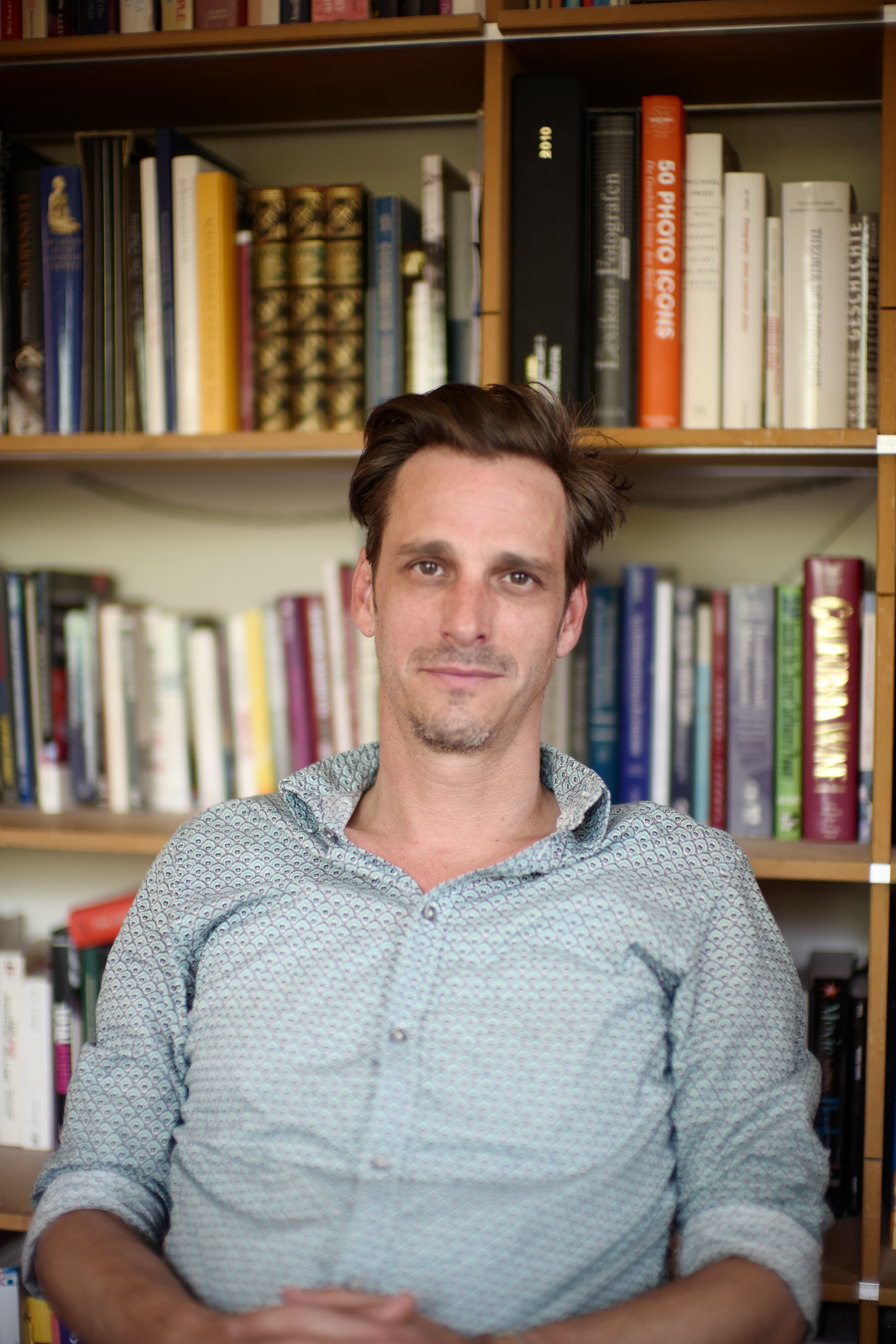
- Max von Thun in 2018
- Born: Maximilian Romedio Johann-Ernst Thun-Hohenstein; 21 February 1977 (age 49); Munich, West Germany
- Citizenship: Germany; Austria
- Occupations: Actor; television presenter
- Years active: 1997–present
- Children: 1

Maximilian Romedio Johann-Ernst Thun-Hohenstein (born 21 February 1977), commonly known as Max von Thun, is a German-Austrian actor and television presenter.

== Biography ==
He is the son of Austrian actor Friedrich von Thun and his first wife, Gabriele Bleyler (b. 1941). By birth, he is a member of an ancient noble House of Thun und Hohenstein.

== Selected filmography ==
Film
Year	Title	Role	Notes
2001	Alles wegen Paul	Paul	
2004	Samba in Mettmann	Anthony	
2004	Mädchen, Mädchen 2 – Loft oder Liebe	Johan	
2006	The Crown Prince	Rudolf, Crown Prince of Austria	TV miniseries
2008	Remarque – Sein Weg zum Ruhm	Erich Maria Remarque	TV film
2011	In the World You Have Fear	Jo Kramer	
2011	Woman in Love	Thomas Henning	
2011	Sommer der Gaukler	Emanuel Schikaneder	
2014	A Spicy Kraut	Gero	
2015	Traumfrauen	Constantin	
2016	Gut zu Vögeln	Jacob	
