= Volgograd Regional Committee of the Communist Party of the Soviet Union =

Regional department of Communist Party of Soviet Union (CPSU)

The Volgograd Regional Committee of the Communist Party of the Soviet Union, commonly referred to as the Volgograd CPSU obkom, was the position of highest authority in the Volgograd Oblast (until November 10, 1961, Stalingrad Oblast), in the Russian SFSR of the Soviet Union. The position was created in January 1934, and abolished in August 1991. The First Secretary was a de facto appointed position usually by the Politburo or the General Secretary himself.

== List of First Secretaries of the Communist Party of Volgograd ==
Name	Term of Office		Life years
Name	Start	End	Life years
First Secretaries of the Kray Committee of the Communist Party
Vladimir Ptukha	January 1934	March 20, 1935	1894–1938
Iosif Vareikis	March 20, 1935	December 5, 1936	1894–1939
First Secretaries of the Oblast Committee of the Communist Party
Iosif Vareikis	December 5, 1936	December 22, 1936	1894–1939
Boris Semyonov	December 22, 1936	September 16, 1937	1890–1937
Pyotr Smorodin	September 16, 1937	June 1938	1897–1939
Aleksey Chuyanov (Note: Acting to August 4, 1938)	June 1938	December 6, 1946	1905–1977
Vasily Prokhvatilov	December 6, 1946	January 1949	1902–1983
Ivan Grishin	January 1949	December 1955	1911–1985
Ivan Zhegalin	December 1955	November 26, 1960	1906–1984
Aleksey Shkolnikov (Note: For Agriculture January 1963 – December 15, 1964)	November 26, 1960	November 12, 1965	1914–2003
Konstantin Cherednychenko (Note: For Industry)	January 1963	December 15, 1964	1920–
Leonid Kulichenko	November 12, 1965	January 24, 1984	1913–1990
Vladimir Kalashnikov	January 24, 1984	January 24, 1990	1929–2008
V.G. Ronshin (Note: Acting)	January 24, 1990	1990	
Aleksandr Anipkin	March 16, 1990	August 1991	1940–

== See also ==
- Volgograd Oblast

== Sources ==
- World Statesmen.org
