= Turgenevo, Republic of Mordovia =

Turgenevo Тургенево
- Work settlement
- Interactive map of Turgenevo
- Location of Turgenevo Turgenevo (Republic of Mordovia)
- Coordinates: 54°51′N 46°20′E
- Country: Russia
- Federal subject: Mordovia
- Administrative district: Ardatovsky District
- Work SettlementSelsoviet: Turgenevo Work Settlement
- Urban-type settlement status since: 1960

Population (2010 Census)
  - Total: 5,260
  - Estimate (2025): 4,184 (−20.5%)

Administrative status
  - Capital of: Turgenevo Work Settlement

Municipal status
  - Municipal district: Ardatovsky Municipal District
  - Urban settlement: Turgenevskoye Urban Settlement
  - Capital of: Turgenevskoye Urban Settlement
- Time zone: UTC+3 (MSK)
- Postal codes: 431890, 431891
- OKTMO ID: 89603155051

Turgenevo population
- 2010 Census: 5,260
- 2002 Census: 5,288
- 1989 Census: 5,614
- 1979 Census: 6,150

Turgenevo (Russian: Турге́нево) is an urban locality (a work settlement) in Ardatovsky District of the Republic of Mordovia, Russia. As of the 2010 Census, its population was 5,260.

== History ==
Urban-type settlement status was granted to it in 1960.

== Administrative and municipal status ==
Within the framework of administrative divisions, the work settlement of Turgenevo, together with one rural locality (the settlement of Svetotekhnika), is incorporated within Ardatovsky District as Turgenevo Work Settlement (an administrative division of the district). As a municipal division, Turgenevo Work Settlement is incorporated within Ardatovsky Municipal District as Turgenevskoye Urban Settlement.
