= Iosif Vareikis =

Soviet politician (1894–1938)

- Ио́сиф Варе́йкис
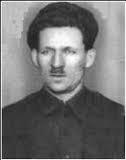

First Secretary of the Far Eastern Regional Committee the Communist Party of the Soviet Union
- In office 15 January 1937 – 3 October 1937
- Preceded by: Lavrenty Kartvelishvili
- Succeeded by: Georgy Stasevich

First Secretary of the Stalingrad Regional Committee of the Communist Party of the Soviet Union
- In office 20 March 1935 – 22 December 1936
- Preceded by: Vladimir Ptukha
- Succeeded by: Boris Semyonov

Personal details
- Born: 18 October 1894 Ukmergė County, Kovno Governorate, Russian Empire
- Died: 28 July 1938 (aged 43) Kommunarka shooting ground, Moscow, RSFSR, Soviet Union
- Party: Russian Social Democratic Labour Party (Bolsheviks) (1913–1918); All-Union Communist Party (b) (1918–1937)
- Awards: Order of Lenin

Iosif Mikhailovich Vareikis (Russian: Ио́сиф (Юозас) Миха́йлович Варе́йкис, romanized: Iosif (Yuozas) Mikhaylovich Vareykis; Lithuanian: Juozas Vareikis; 18 October 1894 – 28 July 1938) was a Soviet Lithuanian politician and Communist Party official.

== Biography ==
=== Early career ===
Born into a working-class family in a village called Aseka-Vareiki, in Kovno (Kaunas) province, Lithuania, he moved to Moscow and worked as a turner-toolmaker at factories. From 1911 he was involved in underground social democratic circles and eventually joined the Russian Social Democratic Labour Party (Bolsheviks) in 1913.

In the summer of 1913, Vareikis and two other Bolsheviks founded a sports club in Podolsk with the aim of involving workers in revolutionary activities. With his participation, the football team of the Singer sewing machine plant was founded.

At the beginning of the First World War, Vareikis published defeatist and revolutionary leaflets among workers as well as leading and participating in many anti-government strikes.

After the February Revolution, he was elected a member of the Presidium of the Podolsk Soviet, Moscow province. After the October Revolution, he became an organizer of Red Guard detachments and became a member of the Yekaterinoslav committee of the RSDLP(b).

From January 1918 he became the secretary of the Donetsk-Krivoy Rog regional committee of the Russian Communist Party (b) in Kharkov and the people's commissar for social security of the Donetsk-Krivoy Rog Soviet Republic.

From June 1918 to August 1920, he worked as chairman of the Simbirsk provincial committee of the RCP (b) and was a member of the Revolutionary Military Council and the emergency commandant of Simbirsk during the defense of the city from units of the Czechoslovak corps.

In July 1918, together with Mikhail Tukhachevsky, he led the suppression of the uprising of the Left Socialist Revolutionaries, and also made the arrest of the commander of the Eastern Front Mikhail Muravyov and his supporters.

=== Soviet official ===
From 1920 to 1921 he worked in Vitebsk as an authorized All-Russian Central Executive Committee and People's Commissar of Food, as well as the chairman of the Vitebsk provincial executive committee. From 1921 to 1923 he was deputy chairman of the Baku Council.

From 25 April 1923 to 23 May 1924 Vareikis was a candidate member of the Central Control Commission of the All-Union Communist Party (Bolsheviks). From February 1924 he was the executive secretary of the Central Committee of the Communist Party (Bolsheviks) of Turkestan and a member of the Central Asian Bureau of the Central Committee of the RCP (B).

From October 1924 to January 1926 he worked as the head of the press department of the Central Committee. In this capacity, he was he was the "main literary censor in the Central Committee" and a "loyal Stalinist". Writing in Pravda in February 1925, he called for the "creation of an imaginative literature which is suitable for the ideological education of the broad masses", implying that the party should be telling writers how to write.

Early in 1925, he also assumed the editorship of Molodaya Gvardiya (Young Guard), the magazine of Komsomol, the Communist Youth League, whose leaders had initially supported Leon Trotsky in the power struggle that followed the death of the founder of the communist party, Vladimir Lenin. The first issue that Vareikis edited had a picture of Joseph Stalin on its front cover.

From January 1926 to April 1928 he was secretary of the Saratov Provincial Committee of the All-Union Communist Party(b). From August 1928 to 19 June 1934 he was the first secretary of the regional party committee of the Central Black Earth Oblast. On 13 July 1930 he became a member of the Central Committee.

When an anti-communist uprising broke out in January 1929 in the Ostrogozhsky district of the Central Black Earth District, Vareikis personally directed its suppression. He also directed the policy of collectivism in the oblast. From February 1930 to April 1931 alone, 19,238 people were convicted by the OGPU troikas, of whom 15, 233 were convicted for active "counterrevolutionary agitation and participation in counterrevolutionary organizations".

In August 1934, he was drafted into helping prepare the First Congress of Soviet Writers, but a speech he delivered enraged the Congress chairman, the writer, Maxim Gorky, who thought it was "harmful (and) illiterate in general" Stalin's deputy, Lazar Kaganovich informed him that Gorky had written an article for Pravda attacking Vareikis so harshly that staff at the newspaper did not want to publish it. Kaganovich reported that Gorky so loathed Vareikis that he could not talk calmly to him.

When the Central Black Earth region was divided into the Voronezh and Kursk regions, on 19 June 1934, Vareikis was appointed head of the Voronezh regional party committee. From 20 March 1935 to 22 December 1936 he was the first secretary of the Stalingrad Regional Party Committee. From January to October 1937 he was first secretary of the party committee for Far Eastern territory (Dalkraikom).

=== Great Purge ===
Early in the Great Purge, Vareikis set out to demonstrate his loyalty and diligence in uncovering 'saboteurs', 'spies' and other enemies. Before he left to take office in the Far Eastern territory, he was told by Stalin that the Dalkraikom was "in a state of semi-war." On arrival in the territorial capital, Khabarovsk, he accused the chairman of Dalkraikom, Grigori Kutov, of having allowed "Trotskyite-Japanese agents" to sabotage the regional economy.

On 8 September Vareikis sent a written report on the Politburo, saying 500 spies were identified and shot among the railway workers alone. This prompted Stalin to ask: "Comrade Vareikis, why is it that there are so many spies in your area of work?” On 16 September, he told a meeting of the bureau of Dalkraikom that "due to the loss of class vigilance of a number of leading workers, the enemies of the people, Japanese-German agents, Trotskyists, spies and saboteurs, carried out counter-revolutionary agitation and subversive wrecking work at construction sites and enterprises" in the far eastern port of Sovetskaya Gavan.

He was also involved in the mass deportation of Koreans. In August 1937, after the Japanese invasion of North China, Stalin signed order that all Koreans were to be removed from the Far Eastern Territory. Under the direction of Vareikis, and the head of the Far Eastern NKVD, Genrikh Lyushkov, more than 170,000 Koreans were deported to Central Asia in a few weeks.

=== Relations with Stalin ===
In May 1937, Vareikis was denounced by a former colleague named Malinov, from the Central Black earth district, who while under arrest told his interrogators that Vareikis had complained that Stalin was "a difficult person" to work with, and that he had privately complained about being under valued. Stalin read this, and passed it to Vareikis, who wrote to him in June, saying that it was all lies.

But it is likely that the arrested man was speaking the truth, because after Stalin's death, Anastas Mikoyan told how, towards the end of the 19th Party Congress, in 1934, a group of regional party secretaries led by Vareikis approached Sergei Kirov and asked him to pass on their complaint that Stalin was rude, intolerant arrogant. Kirov's first reaction was to tell them to speak directly to Stalin, but he did eventually pass on the message.

It is rumoured that what the group that Vareikis led actually hoped to achieve at the Congress was to remove Stalin from the post of General Secretary, and appoint Kirov in his place.

In August, Genrikh Lyushkov, a close associate of the head of the NKVD, Nikolai Yezhov was appointed head of the Far Eastern regional NKVD. Before he left to take up the appointment, he was told by Stalin that Vareikis was "not reliable".

In September, Vareikis apparently questioned whether some the arrests taking place in Moscow were justified. Stalin reportedly lost his temper and shouted down the phone at Vareikis: "It's none of your business. Don't mix in where you don't belong." - and warned that anyone questioning the arrest and execution of Marshal Tukhachevsky, whom Vareikis had known for 19 years, was 'an enemy of the Soviet regime.' sent him a telegram saying "Yezhov's orders for arrests in the Far Eastern Province are usually made with the approval of the Central Committee.".

=== Arrest and death ===
Vareikis was removed from the post of first secretary of the Far Eastern Regional Committee on 3 October 1937, and recalled to Moscow, where he was arrested as he got off the train, and accused of being part of the counterrevolutionary 'Rightist-Trotskyist' organization in the Central Black Oblast. Under interrogation, he made to 'confess' that he had been a spy for the Tsarist police from 1915, an allegation that Stalin repeated to the head of Comintern, Georgi Dimitrov on 7 November. that he and Yakov Yakovlev had set up a secret counter-revolutionary organisation in the Central Committee press department in 1924.

On 12 October 1937 he was removed from the Central Committee as an 'enemy of the people'. On 21 October the plenum of the Dalkraikom of the VKP (b) officially dismissed Vareikis from the post of first secretary.

On 29 July 1938 Iosif Vareikis was sentenced to death by the verdict of the Military Collegium of the Supreme Court of the Soviet Union and was shot on the same day in the Kommunarka NKVD shooting ground.

On 26 May 1956 he was rehabilitated and reinstated in the party.
