= Cavalcade (magazine) =

British news magazine (1936–1950)

- Categories: News magazine
- Frequency: Weekly
- Publisher: News Periodicals Ltd
- Founded: 1936
- First issue: February 1936
- Final issue: 1950
- Country: United Kingdom
- Language: English

Cavalcade was a British weekly news magazine which was in circulation between 1936 and 1950. It was modelled on the American magazine Time. The first issue of Cavalcade appeared in February 1936. The founding publisher was News Periodicals Ltd. In 1937 Cavalcade reported that its circulation was 50,000 copies, but next year the magazine was sold due to financial problems.

Cavalcade was the only British publication which published the photographs of King Edward and Wallis Simpson in the summer of 1936 taken when they were on holiday. These photographs made their relationship publicly known for the first time.

An Australian edition of the same titled magazine was published in Sydney between the 1940s and persisted into the 1970s. It was distributed by Gordon & Gotch and featured short fiction, self-improvement reports, "cheesecake pinups" and cartoons.
