= Genrikh Lyushkov =

Soviet defector

- Генрих Люшков
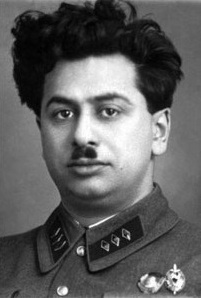
- Born: 1900; Odessa, Russian Empire
- Died: August 19, 1945 (aged 45); Dalian, Liaoning, China
- Cause of death: Execution by shooting
- Spouse: Inna Lyushkova
- Children: 1

Far Eastern Commander of the NKVD
- In office 31 July 1937 – 13 June 1938
- Preceded by: Terenti Deribas
- Succeeded by: Grigori Gorbach

Genrikh Samoilovich Lyushkov (Russian: Генрих Самойлович Люшков; 1900 – 19 August 1945) was a Soviet secret police officer. A high-ranking officer of the NKVD, he played a role in implementing Stalin's Great Purge. When, in 1938, he suspected he would soon fall victim to the purge, he fled to Japan, becoming the highest-ranking NKVD defector in the organization's history. Thereafter, he acted as a major source of intelligence for Imperial Japan about the Soviet Union. At the end of World War II, he was killed by the Japanese in order to prevent him from falling back into Soviet hands.

== Early life ==
Lyushkov was born in Odessa in the Russian Empire in 1900. His Jewish father supported him and his siblings as a tailor. He began his education in 1908 in a state-owned, six-classroom school, continuing there until 1915. While in school, he was influenced by his brother (a member of the Bolshevik underground) to join the Bolshevik Party and take part in the Russian Revolution several years later.

In April 1919, he received political training in Kiev for the Ukrainian People's Republic. During this time, the Russian Civil War broke out and after his graduation in September of that year, Lyushkov was assigned to the Red Army's 14th Army for political work, where he saw combat against Poles and the White Russian forces of Anton Denikin. By then, he was a fully-fledged political commissar and had received the Order of the Red Banner.

== Secret police ==
In November 1920, he joined the Cheka of Odessa, which became known for its ruthlessness. He also served in Moscow and Ukraine. When the Cheka was disbanded and reformed into the GPU (the Государственное политическое управление НКВД РСФСР or "State Political Directorate"), Lyushkov rose even further. Around 1930, he carried out an industrial espionage assignment in Germany, where he monitored activities within the Junkers aviation company, bringing him the favour of Joseph Stalin. This success led to his working again within the USSR, now as a member of the NKVD (the Народный комиссариат внутренних дел or "People's Commissariat for Internal Affairs"). He was quickly transferred to preferential positions such as his posting as the NKVD chief in the Sea of Azov-Black Sea region as well as being awarded the Order of Lenin "for exemplary performance of tasks of the Party and government." He was also made a deputy of the Supreme Soviet and a member of the Central Committee.

During the time of the Moscow Trials, he was the one who led the interrogations of Zinoviev and Kamenev. Later, he earned a reputation as "an arrogant, arbitrary and sadistic bully...." On 31 July 1937, he received his final posting, as the NKVD chief in the Far East, where he had direct command over "20,000–30,000 élite NKVD troops."

When he was given the post, he was, according to a later interview with Japanese military officials, given personal orders to aid in elimination of specific officials as a part of the Great Purge: Iosif Vareikis (Former Secretary of the Central Black Earth Region), Terenti Deribas (the former NKVD chief in the Far East, whom Lyushkov was replacing), Vasily Blyukher (a Marshal of the Soviet Union), and Albert Yanovich Lapin (the Far East Air Corps Commander). Vareikis, Deribas, Blyukher, and Lapin all fell victim to the Great Purge. Vareikis arrest was from Lyushkov being told by Stalin that Vareikis was "not reliable". Deribas' arrest and execution resulted from evidence gathered by Lyushkov. Blyukher's arrest and subsequent death resulted from blame being assigned to him for Lyushkov's defection. Lapin committed suicide while imprisoned.

Prompted later by his Japanese interrogators, Lyushkov gave one of the earliest explanations of the circumstances of the Great Purge, arguing that he had been merely appeasing Stalin and that he had no choice but to carry out his orders. Lyushkov, immediately upon arriving in Khabarovsk, saw that Deribas had been arrested and sent to Moscow for trial and execution.

Lyushkov commanded the local NKVD troika and was involved in mass executions.

By then, Lyushkov had been promoted to "third-rank commissar of state security" (комиссар госбезопасности 3-го ранга) or "Commissar 3rd Class", the approximate equivalent of a major-general in the Imperial Japanese Army.

== Defection ==
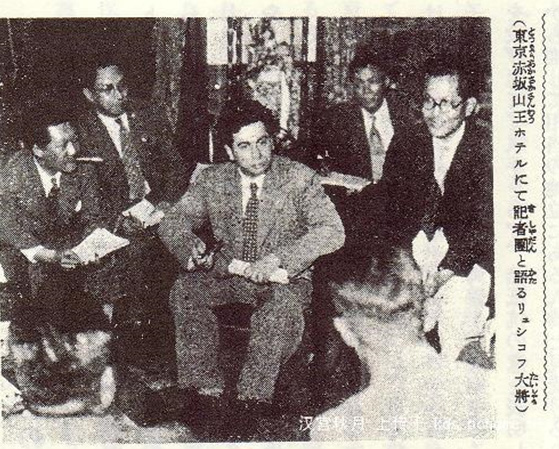
Lyushkov (center) at a press conference in Tokyo, following his defection.

In 1938, he was ordered to return to Moscow "for new work".

In preparation for his defection, Lyushkov arranged for his Jewish wife, Inna, to leave the country with his eleven-year-old daughter, for the daughter to receive medical treatment in Poland. The plan was for Inna to embed a secret codeword into a telegram, which would signal to Lyushkov that it was safe for him to leave the Soviet Union.

Under unknown circumstances, however, Inna and her daughter were captured. Though the daughter's fate remains unknown, Inna was kept at the Lubyanka prison before eventually being sent to the Gulag.

On 13 June 1938, Lyushkov defected from the Soviet Union by crossing the border at Posyet into Manchukuo with valuable secret documents about the Soviet military strength in the region, which was much greater than the Japanese had realised. He was the highest-ranking secret police official to defect; he also had the greatest inside knowledge about the purges within the Soviet Red Army because of his own participation in carrying them out. Richard Sorge told the Kremlin of the defection because a Nazi intelligence officer had debriefed Lyushkov and Sorge obtained a copy of the top secret document and sent it to Moscow in June 1938.

His defection was initially kept a state secret by Japan, but the revelation of his defection was judged to have a high propaganda value, so the decision was made to release the news to the world. A press conference was arranged at a Tokyo hotel on 13 July, a month after Lyushkov had defected. He "categorically denied Moscow's allegation that he was an imposter" but some news agencies, such as the New York Times wondered if he was telling the truth.

During subsequent interviews and interactions with Japanese military personnel, Lyushkov adopted an anti-Stalinist position. However, his professed political views remained socialistic in nature according to the recollections of some Japanese intelligence officers, with Lyushkov calling himself a Trotskyite, but some Japanese officers believed that he had later become a liberal communist. Though Lyushkov was anti-Stalinist, he was resistant to the idea of creating a new regime led by Russian émigrés. He was, however, willing to include them in a proposed plan for assassination of Stalin.

A resistance group of Russian emigrants would travel across the Turkish-Soviet border when Stalin would travel south to a resort in Sochi, which he had visited previously to swim in the Matsesta River. Lyushkov's intimate knowledge of NKVD procedures and the way Stalin's guard detail would be organised encouraged the Japanese to support the plan. However, a Soviet agent had infiltrated the group of Russian exiles and foiled the plan, which was considered the only serious attempt to assassinate Stalin.

Lyushkov was able to detail the strength of the Red Army in the Far East, Siberia and Ukraine, simultaneously providing Soviet military radio codes. He was considered highly intelligent and dedicated, producing great volumes of written material, but there was some uncertainty about his ability to provide useful information specific to military operations.

As he spent more time in Japan, his hard work impressed the Japanese intelligence officers with whom he had been assigned to work. The staff of the Imperial Japanese Army had concerns, however, about his psychological state, especially pertaining to the status of his wife and daughter, about whom he had heard no news since his defection. After a failed search by Japanese intelligence agents for his family, a plan to both pacify and "domesticate" Lyushkov was decided upon: he would be paired with a woman, both to distract him from the question of his family's status and to keep him rooted in Japan. An eventual match was found after Lyushkov refused several White émigré women.

At some point, he began to make plans to travel to the United States and contacted an American publisher about a possible autobiography that he would write. He had concerns that he might be prevented from leaving Japan and went as far as to negotiate a written safe-conduct guarantee.

== Disappearance and death ==
After Germany's capitulation, Lyushkov was sent on 20 July 1945 to work for the Japanese Kwantung Army's Special Intelligence authorities in the puppet state of Manchukuo. On 9 August 1945, the Soviet invasion of Manchuria commenced and Lyushkov vanished amongst the confusion caused by the sudden assault. His ultimate fate was unknown until 1979, as he was reportedly last seen in a crowd at a Dalian train station. Some theories held that he was captured by the Red Army or that he was killed on the orders of a Japanese Special Intelligence officer. However in 1979, Yutaka Takeoka, who was a young intelligence officer and Lyushkov's handler at the end of the war, admitted publicly that he executed Lyushkov on the evening of 19 August 1945. With Soviet forces approaching, Takeoka was initially content with letting Lyushkov try to make an escape but his superior, General Genzo Yanagita, told him that this was unacceptable because Lyushkov could give away Japanese military secrets to the Soviet Union when he was inevitably captured. Takeoka met with Lyushkov in his hotel room in Dalian and tried to persuade Lyushkov to commit suicide; when Lyushkov refused and indicated his intent to go on the run, Takeoka shot him. Lyushkov was cremated and his ashes were interred in a temple for the unknown dead.

== See also ==
- List of Soviet and Eastern Bloc defectors
