= Turgenevsky (rural locality) =

Turgenevsky (Russian: Тургеневский; masculine), Turgenevskaya (Тургеневская; feminine), or Turgenevskoye (Тургеневское; neuter) is the name of several rural localities in Russia:

- Turgenevsky, Oryol Oblast, a settlement in Koshelevsky Selsoviet of Sverdlovsky District in Oryol Oblast; 52°35′N 36°12′E
- Turgenevsky, Saratov Oblast, a settlement in Pugachyovsky District of Saratov Oblast
- Turgenevsky, Tula Oblast, a settlement in Velminskaya Rural Administration of Uzlovsky District in Tula Oblast
