= Ardatovo, Republic of Bashkortostan =

Ardatovo Ардатово
- Village
- Location within Bashkortostan Location within Russia
- Coordinates: 52°22′N 56°33′E
- Country: Russia
- Region: Bashkortostan
- District: Kugarchinsky District
- Time zone: UTC+5:00

Ardatovo (Russian: Ардатово; Bashkir: Арҙат, Arźat) is a rural locality (a village) in Maxyutovsky Selsoviet, Kugarchinsky District, Bashkortostan, Russia. The population was 191 as of 2010. There are 2 streets.

== Geography ==
Ardatovo is located 50 km south of Mrakovo (the district's administrative centre) by road. Nizhneye Sazovo is the nearest rural locality.
