= Cavalcade (1960 film) =

1960 film

- Directed by: Albert Arliss; Richard von Schenk
- Written by: Albert Arliss; José Ramón Luna
- Produced by: Tonino Cervi; Robert Philippi
- Starring: Ruth Niehaus; Helmuth Schneider; Félix Tortorelli
- Cinematography: Luis Galán de Tierra
- Edited by: Vicente Castagno; Adolf Schlyssleder
- Music by: George Andreani; Frank Fox
- Release date: 1960
- Running time: 87 minute
- Country: Argentina
- Language: Spanish

Cavalcade is a 1960 Argentine film directed by Albert Arliss and Richard von Schenk and starring Ruth Niehaus and Helmuth Schneider.

== Cast ==
- Ruth Niehaus as Juanita
- Helmuth Schneider as Ernst Herrera
- Félix Tortorelli
- Jorge Lanza
- Joaquín Petrocino
- Raúl del Valle
- Hayda Delessa
- Oscar Fuentes
- Albert Arliss
