= Kommissar LaBréa =

- Starring: Francis Fulton-Smith
- Country of origin: Germany

Kommissar LaBréa is a German television series.

== Cast ==
- Francis Fulton Smith as Maurice LaBrea
- Daniel Freidrich as Daniel Thibon
- Leonie Brill as Jenny LaBrea

== See also ==
- List of German television series
