= Ardatovsky District, Republic of Mordovia =

Ardatovsky District Ардатовский район (Russian)
- District

Other transcription(s)
  - Erzya: Орданьбуе
  - Moksha: Ардатовань аймак
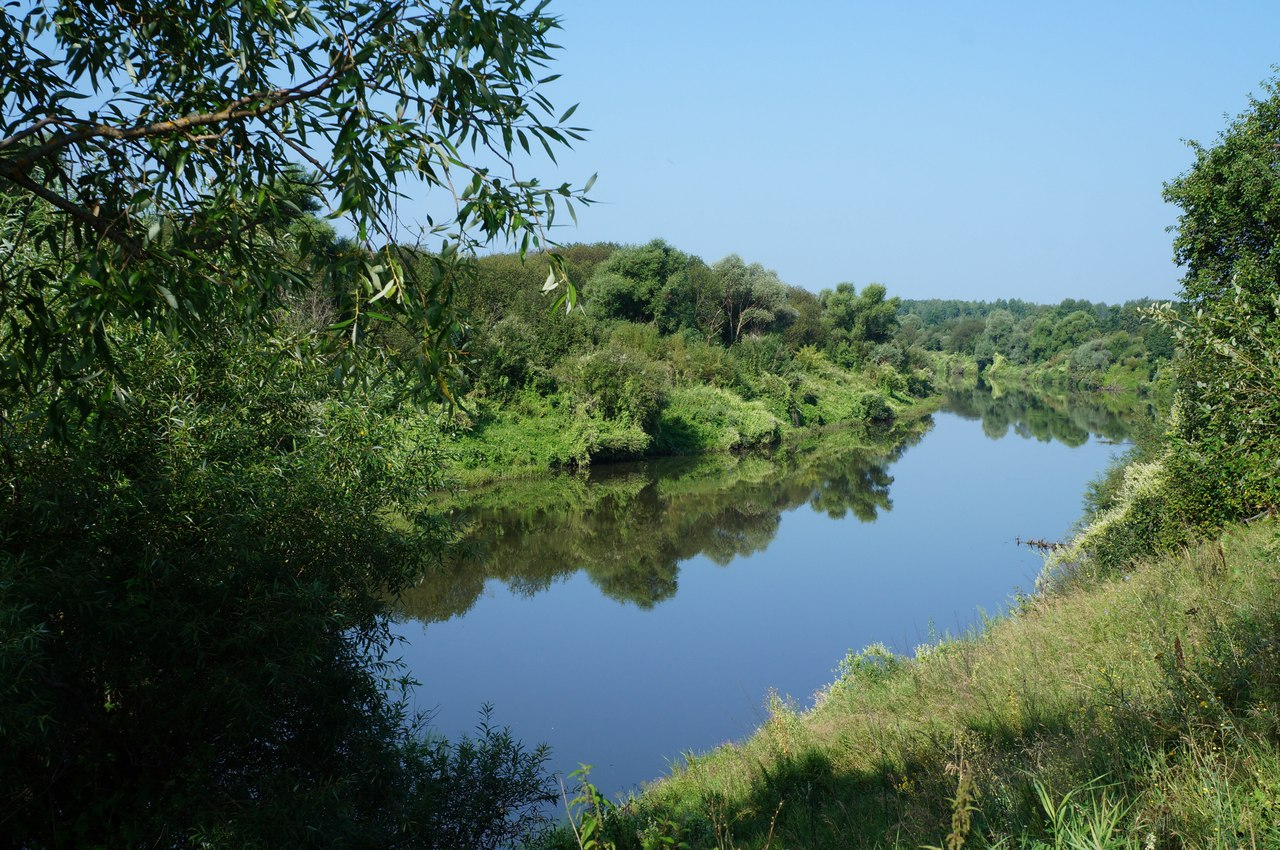
- Alatyr River near the village of Mokrovka, Ardatov District

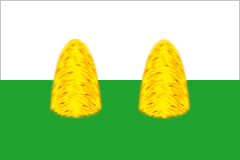
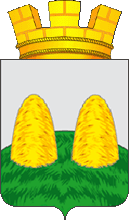
- Flag Coat of arms
- Location of Ardatovsky District in the Republic of Mordovia
- Coordinates: 54°51′N 46°14′E
- Country: Russia
- Federal subject: Republic of Mordovia
- Established: 16 July 1928
- Administrative center: Ardatov

Area
  - Total: 1,192.5 km^{2} (460.4 sq mi)

Population (2010 Census)
  - Total: 29,446
  - Density: 24.693/km^{2} (63.954/sq mi)
  - Urban: 49.8%
  - Rural: 50.2%

Administrative structure
  - Administrative divisions: 1 Towns of district significance, 1 Work settlements, 21 Selsoviets
  - Inhabited localities: 1 cities/towns, 1 urban-type settlements, 54 rural localities

Municipal structure
  - Municipally incorporated as: Ardatovsky Municipal District
  - Municipal divisions: 2 urban settlements, 21 rural settlements
- Time zone: UTC+3 (MSK)
- OKTMO ID: 89603000
- Website: https://ardatov-rm.ru/

Population of Ardatovsky District
- 2010 Census: 29,446
- 2002 Census: 31,565
- 1989 Census: 36,210
- 1979 Census: 41,384

Ardatovsky District (Russian: Арда́товский райо́н; Erzya: Орданьбуе Ordańbuje; Moksha: Ардатовань аймак, Ardatovań ajmak) is an administrative and municipal district (raion), one of the twenty-two in the Republic of Mordovia, Russia. It is located in the northeast of the republic. The area of the district is 1,192.5 square kilometers (460.4 sq mi). Its administrative center is the town of Ardatov. As of the 2010 Census, the total population of the district was 29,446, with the population of Ardatov accounting for 31.9% of that number.

== Administrative and municipal status ==
Within the framework of administrative divisions, Ardatovsky District is one of the twenty-two in the republic. It is divided into one town of district significance (Ardatov), one work settlement (an administrative division with the administrative center in the work settlement (inhabited locality) of Turgenevo), and twenty-one selsoviets, all of which comprise fifty-four rural localities. As a municipal division, the district is incorporated as Ardatovsky Municipal District. The town of district significance of Ardatov and Turgenevo Work Settlement are incorporated into two urban settlements, and the twenty-one selsoviets are incorporated into twenty-one rural settlements within the municipal district. The town of Ardatov serves as the administrative center of both the administrative and municipal district.

== Notable residents ==
- Stepan Erzya (1876–1959), Mordvin sculptor
