= Ardatov (town), Republic of Mordovia =

Town in the Republic of Mordovia, Russia

Ardatov Ардатов
- Town

Other transcription(s)
  - Erzya: Орданьбуе
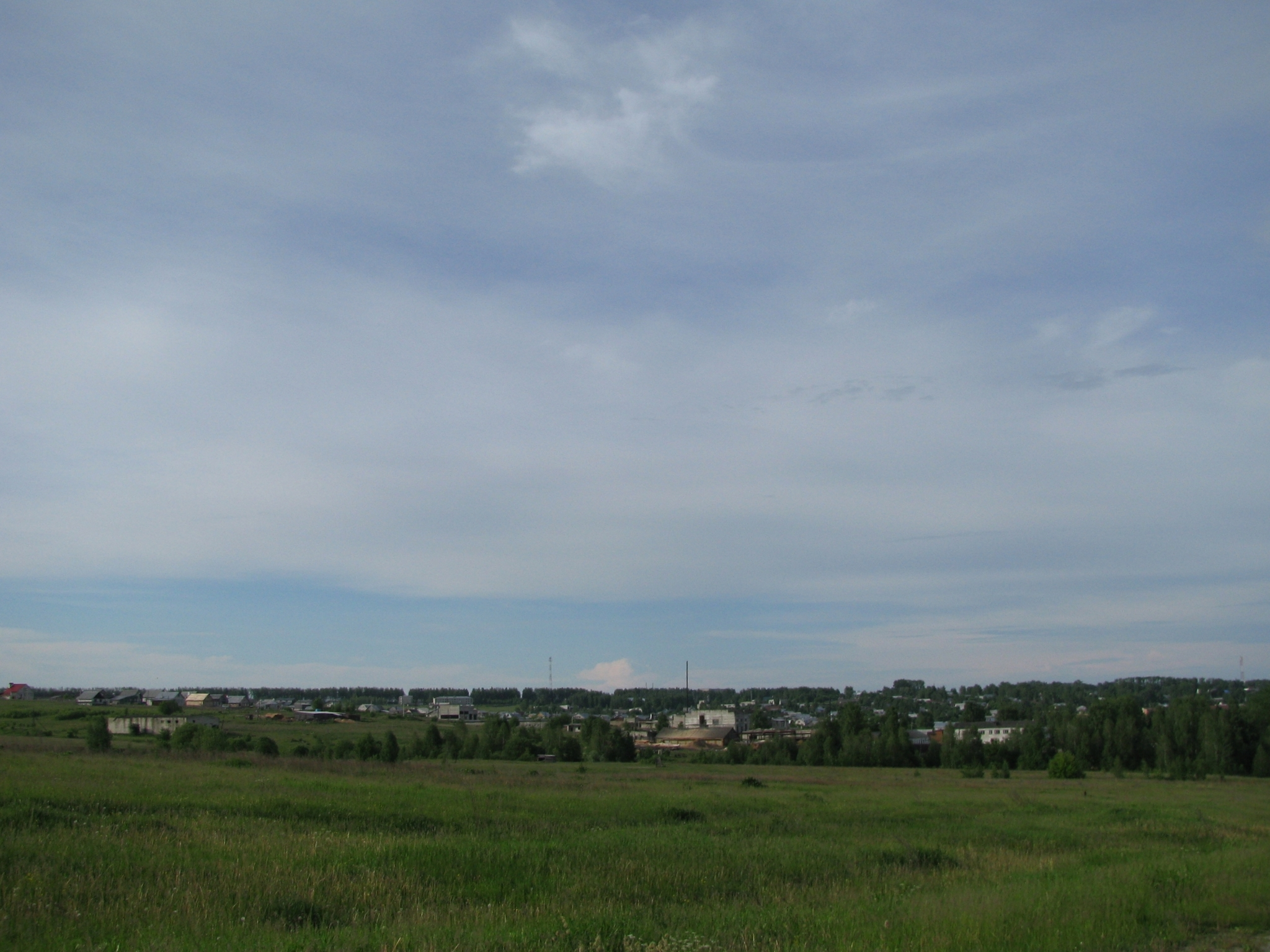

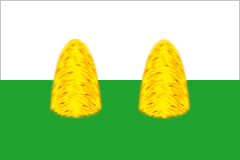
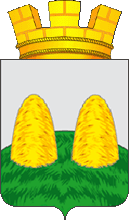
- Flag Coat of arms
- Interactive map of Ardatov
- Location of Ardatov Ardatov (Republic of Mordovia)
- Coordinates: 54°51′N 46°14′E
- Country: Russia
- Federal subject: Mordovia
- Administrative district: Ardatovsky District
- Town of district significanceSelsoviet: Ardatov
- First mentioned: 1671
- Town status since: 1780
- Elevation: 147 m (482 ft)

Population (2010 Census)
  - Total: 9,400
  - Estimate (2021): 8,857 (−5.8%)

Administrative status
  - Capital of: Ardatovsky District, town of district significance of Ardatov

Municipal status
  - Municipal district: Ardatovsky Municipal District
  - Urban settlement: Ardatov Urban Settlement
  - Capital of: Ardatovsky Municipal District, Ardatov Urban Settlement
- Time zone: UTC+3 (MSK)
- Postal codes: 431860, 431861, 431899
- OKTMO ID: 89603101001

Ardatov population
- 2010 Census: 9,400
- 2002 Census: 9,587
- 1989 Census: 10,027
- 1979 Census: 9,192

Ardatov (Russian: Арда́тов; Erzya: Орданьбуе, Ordańbuje) is a town and the administrative center of Ardatovsky District of the Republic of Mordovia, Russia, located on the Alatyr River 114 kilometers (71 mi) northeast of Saransk, the capital of the republic. As of the 2010 Census, its population was 9,400.

== History ==
It was first mentioned in 1671 as the village of Ardatovo (Арда́тово) and was granted town status in 1780.

== Administrative and municipal status ==
Within the framework of administrative divisions, Ardatov serves as the administrative center of Ardatovsky District. As an administrative division, it is incorporated within Ardatovsky District as the town of district significance of Ardatov. As a municipal division, the town of district significance of Ardatov is incorporated within Ardatovsky Municipal District as Ardatov Urban Settlement.

== Notable people ==
- Iya Arepina (1930–2003), Soviet/Russian actress
- Mikhail Nikolaevich Gernet (1874–1953), Soviet criminologist and legal historian
- Ivan Pozharsky (1905–1938), Soviet military commissar and posthumous Hero of the Soviet Union
