= Watten, Nord =

Watten
- Commune
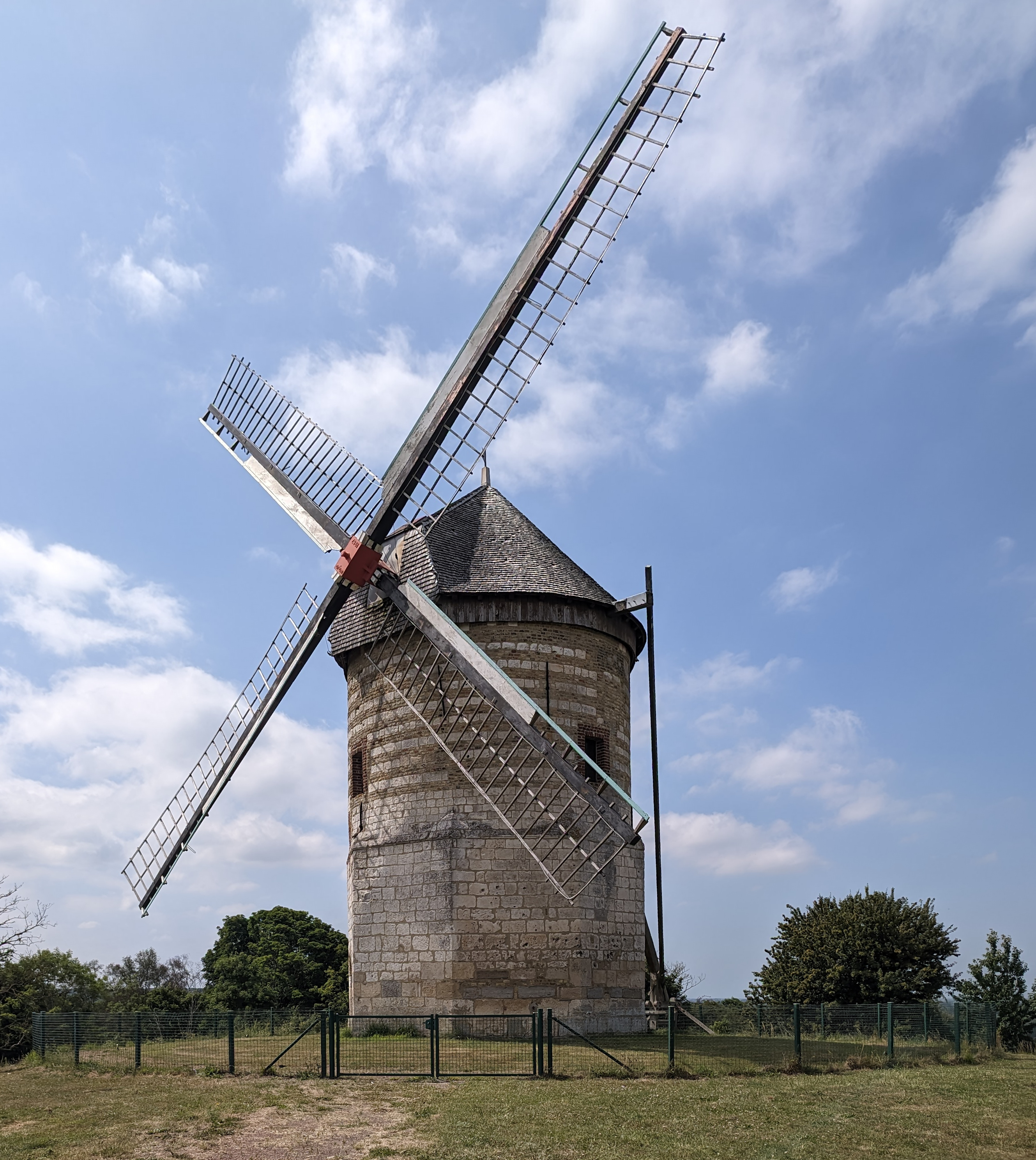
- The windmill in Watten

- Coat of arms
- Location of Watten
- Location within France Location within Hauts-de-France
- Coordinates: 50°50′01″N 2°12′47″E
- Country: France
- Region: Hauts-de-France
- Department: Nord
- Arrondissement: Dunkerque
- Canton: Wormhout
- Intercommunality: Hauts de Flandre

Government
  - Mayor (2020–2026): Daniel Deschodt
- Area^{1}: 7.32 km^{2} (2.83 sq mi)
- Elevation: 55 m (180 ft)
- Highest elevation: 73 m (240 ft)
- Lowest elevation: 1 m (3.3 ft)
- Population (2023): 2,564
  - Density: 350/km^{2} (907/sq mi)
- Time zone: UTC+01:00 (CET)
  - Summer (DST): UTC+02:00 (CEST)
- INSEE/Postal code: 59647 /59143
- ^{1} French Land Register data, which excludes lakes, ponds, glaciers > 1 km^{2} (0.386 sq mi or 247 acres) and river estuaries.

Watten (French pronunciation: [wat]; Dutch: Waten, meaning "ford" as in "river-crossing") is a commune in the Nord department in northern France. Its inhabitants are called "Wattenais".

== History ==
In the 10th century the region around Watten belonged to the Abbey of Saint-Riquier though the counts of Boulogne and Flanders attempted to take possession of it. The abbey of Watten was the oldest foundation of regular canons in the dioceses of Therouanne. While on the way to the Holy Land during the First Crusade, count Robert II of Flanders received several relics from the duke of Apulia, Roger Borsa, including a hair of the Virgin as well as some bones of St Matthew and St Nicholas. Robert II sent them back to his wife Clemence who had them installed in the abbey of Watten in October 1097.

In 1099, pope Urban II granted the regular canons of the Abbey privileges.

== Geography ==
Watten is located at the limit of the French Flanders historical county. However, the local Dutch dialect (French Flemish) is virtually extinct. The neighbouring villages are Wattendam (commune of Holque), Millam, Serques, Éperlecques and Wulverdinghe.

While Watten belongs to the Nord département, it is bordering the Pas-de-Calais département. The village is crossed by the rivers Aa and Colme.

=== Climate ===
Watten has an oceanic climate (Köppen climate classification Cfb). The average annual temperature in Watten is 11.3 °C (52.3 °F). The average annual rainfall is 822.8 mm (32.39 in) with November as the wettest month. The temperatures are highest on average in August, at around 18.6 °C (65.5 °F), and lowest in January, at around 4.8 °C (40.6 °F). The highest temperature ever recorded in Watten was 41.9 °C (107.4 °F) on 25 July 2019; the coldest temperature ever recorded was −19.3 °C (−2.7 °F) on 14 January 1982.

Climate data for Watten (1991−2020 normals, extremes 1970−present)
Month	Jan	Feb	Mar	Apr	May	Jun	Jul	Aug	Sep	Oct	Nov	Dec	Year
Record high °C (°F)	16.1 (61.0)	20.0 (68.0)	25.9 (78.6)	28.9 (84.0)	32.8 (91.0)	35.8 (96.4)	41.9 (107.4)	37.0 (98.6)	33.6 (92.5)	29.9 (85.8)	20.3 (68.5)	16.4 (61.5)	41.9 (107.4)
Mean daily maximum °C (°F)	7.6 (45.7)	8.5 (47.3)	11.7 (53.1)	15.5 (59.9)	18.6 (65.5)	21.3 (70.3)	23.7 (74.7)	23.8 (74.8)	20.7 (69.3)	16.1 (61.0)	11.1 (52.0)	7.9 (46.2)	15.5 (59.9)
Daily mean °C (°F)	4.8 (40.6)	5.3 (41.5)	7.6 (45.7)	10.3 (50.5)	13.5 (56.3)	16.3 (61.3)	18.5 (65.3)	18.6 (65.5)	15.7 (60.3)	12.1 (53.8)	8.1 (46.6)	5.2 (41.4)	11.3 (52.3)
Mean daily minimum °C (°F)	2.0 (35.6)	2.0 (35.6)	3.5 (38.3)	5.1 (41.2)	8.3 (46.9)	11.2 (52.2)	13.4 (56.1)	13.4 (56.1)	10.8 (51.4)	8.1 (46.6)	5.0 (41.0)	2.6 (36.7)	7.1 (44.8)
Record low °C (°F)	−19.3 (−2.7)	−14.6 (5.7)	−11.0 (12.2)	−4.6 (23.7)	−1.4 (29.5)	1.1 (34.0)	4.5 (40.1)	4.7 (40.5)	1.3 (34.3)	−6.8 (19.8)	−9.6 (14.7)	−13.8 (7.2)	−19.3 (−2.7)
Average precipitation mm (inches)	69.5 (2.74)	57.8 (2.28)	50.0 (1.97)	43.9 (1.73)	56.4 (2.22)	58.8 (2.31)	67.0 (2.64)	72.9 (2.87)	71.9 (2.83)	83.9 (3.30)	97.3 (3.83)	93.4 (3.68)	822.8 (32.39)
Average precipitation days (≥ 1.0 mm)	12.8	10.9	9.8	8.6	9.2	9.1	8.9	8.7	10.2	12.5	14.1	14.2	130.0
Source: Météo-France

== Population ==
Historical population
Year	Pop.	±% p.a.
1968	3,005	—
1975	2,819	−0.91%
1982	3,235	+1.99%
1990	3,030	−0.81%
1999	2,925	−0.39%
2007	2,731	−0.85%
2012	2,536	−1.47%
2017	2,563	+0.21%
2023	2,564	+0.01%
Source: INSEE

== Heraldry ==
Arms of Watten	The arms of Watten are blazoned : Per fess argent and gules, 3 pales counterchanged.

== Sights ==
The village is famous for its old ruined abbey, and for its mill, which was restored in the 1990s. These two buildings are located on the "Mountain of Watten" (72 metres high). Its church dates from the thirteenth century.

Nearby is the Blockhaus d'Éperlecques, a massive German bunker site from World War Two, wrecked by Allied bombing. It is now a museum.

== See also ==
- Audomarois
- Communes of the Nord department
