= Arrondissement of Dunkirk =

Coordinates: 51°02′N 2°22′E

Dunkirk
- Arrondissement
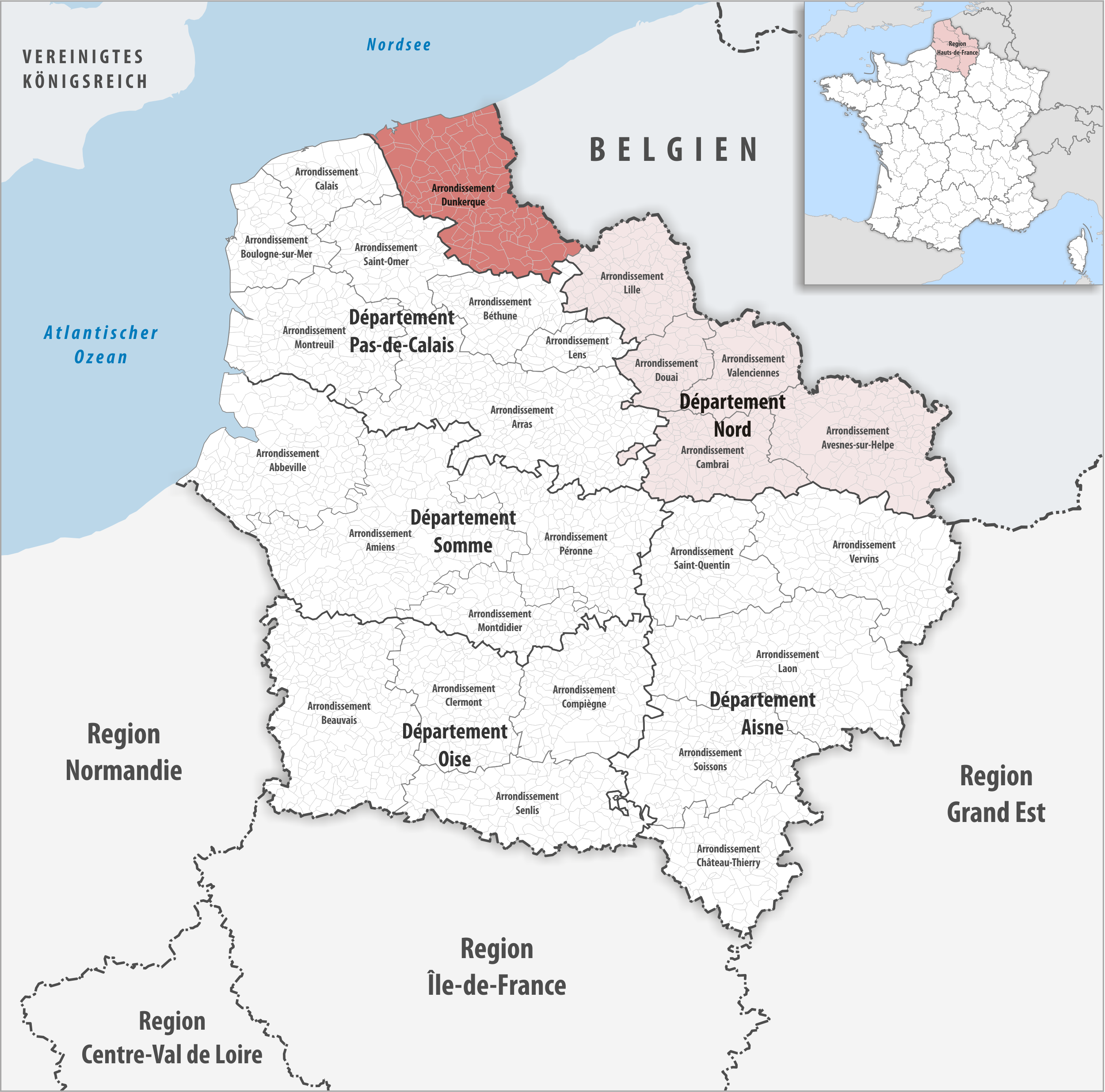
- Location within the region Hauts-de-France
- Country: France
- Region: Hauts-de-France
- Department: Nord
- No. of communes: {{{nbcomm}}}
- Area: 1,442.7 km^{2} (557.0 sq mi)
- Population (2023): 370,983
  - Density: 257.14/km^{2} (666.00/sq mi)
- INSEE code: 594

The arrondissement of Dunkirk (French: Dunkerque, Dutch: Duinkerke) is an arrondissement of France in the Nord department in the Hauts-de-France region. It has 111 communes. Its population is 371,736 (2021), and its area is 1,442.7 km^{2} (557.0 sq mi).

It roughly corresponds to the French Westhoek (part of French Flanders), where traditionally French Flemish is spoken.

== Composition ==
The communes of the arrondissement of Dunkirk, and their INSEE codes, are:

1. Armbouts-Cappel (59016)
2. Arnèke (59018)
3. Bailleul (59043)
4. Bambecque (59046)
5. Bavinchove (59054)
6. Bergues (59067)
7. Berthen (59073)
8. Bierne (59082)
9. Bissezeele (59083)
10. Blaringhem (59084)
11. Boeschepe (59086)
12. Boëseghem (59087)
13. Bollezeele (59089)
14. Borre (59091)
15. Bourbourg (59094)
16. Bray-Dunes (59107)
17. Brouckerque (59110)
18. Broxeele (59111)
19. Buysscheure (59119)
20. Caëstre (59120)
21. Cappelle-Brouck (59130)
22. Cappelle-la-Grande (59131)
23. Cassel (59135)
24. Coudekerque-Branche (59155)
25. Craywick (59159)
26. Crochte (59162)
27. Le Doulieu (59180)
28. Drincham (59182)
29. Dunkerque (59183)
30. Ebblinghem (59184)
31. Eecke (59189)
32. Eringhem (59200)
33. Esquelbecq (59210)
34. Estaires (59212)
35. Flêtre (59237)
36. Ghyvelde (59260)
37. Godewaersvelde (59262)
38. La Gorgue (59268)
39. Grand-Fort-Philippe (59272)
40. Grande-Synthe (59271)
41. Gravelines (59273)
42. Hardifort (59282)
43. Haverskerque (59293)
44. Hazebrouck (59295)
45. Herzeele (59305)
46. Holque (59307)
47. Hondeghem (59308)
48. Hondschoote (59309)
49. Houtkerque (59318)
50. Hoymille (59319)
51. Killem (59326)
52. Lederzeele (59337)
53. Ledringhem (59338)
54. Leffrinckoucke (59340)
55. Looberghe (59358)
56. Loon-Plage (59359)
57. Lynde (59366)
58. Merckeghem (59397)
59. Merris (59399)
60. Merville (59400)
61. Méteren (59401)
62. Millam (59402)
63. Morbecque (59416)
64. Neuf-Berquin (59423)
65. Nieppe (59431)
66. Nieurlet (59433)
67. Noordpeene (59436)
68. Ochtezeele (59443)
69. Oost-Cappel (59448)
70. Oudezeele (59453)
71. Oxelaëre (59454)
72. Pitgam (59463)
73. Pradelles (59469)
74. Quaëdypre (59478)
75. Renescure (59497)
76. Rexpoëde (59499)
77. Rubrouck (59516)
78. Saint-Georges-sur-l'Aa (59532)
79. Sainte-Marie-Cappel (59536)
80. Saint-Jans-Cappel (59535)
81. Saint-Momelin (59538)
82. Saint-Pierre-Brouck (59539)
83. Saint-Sylvestre-Cappel (59546)
84. Sercus (59568)
85. Socx (59570)
86. Spycker (59576)
87. Staple (59577)
88. Steenbecque (59578)
89. Steene (59579)
90. Steenvoorde (59580)
91. Steenwerck (59581)
92. Strazeele (59582)
93. Terdeghem (59587)
94. Téteghem-Coudekerque-Village (59588)
95. Thiennes (59590)
96. Uxem (59605)
97. Vieux-Berquin (59615)
98. Volckerinckhove (59628)
99. Wallon-Cappel (59634)
100. Warhem (59641)
101. Watten (59647)
102. Wemaers-Cappel (59655)
103. West-Cappel (59657)
104. Winnezeele (59662)
105. Wormhout (59663)
106. Wulverdinghe (59664)
107. Wylder (59665)
108. Zegerscappel (59666)
109. Zermezeele (59667)
110. Zuydcoote (59668)
111. Zuytpeene (59669)

== History ==
The arrondissement of Bergues was created in 1800. The subprefecture was moved to Dunkirk in 1803.

As a result of the reorganisation of the cantons of France which came into effect in 2015, the borders of the cantons are no longer related to the borders of the arrondissements. The cantons of the arrondissement of Dunkirk were, as of January 2015:

1. Bailleul-Nord-Est
2. Bailleul-Sud-Ouest
3. Bergues
4. Bourbourg
5. Cassel
6. Coudekerque-Branche
7. Dunkerque-Est
8. Dunkerque-Ouest
9. Grande-Synthe
10. Gravelines
11. Hazebrouck-Nord
12. Hazebrouck-Sud
13. Hondschoote
14. Merville
15. Steenvoorde
16. Wormhout
