= Wemaers-Cappel =

- Commune
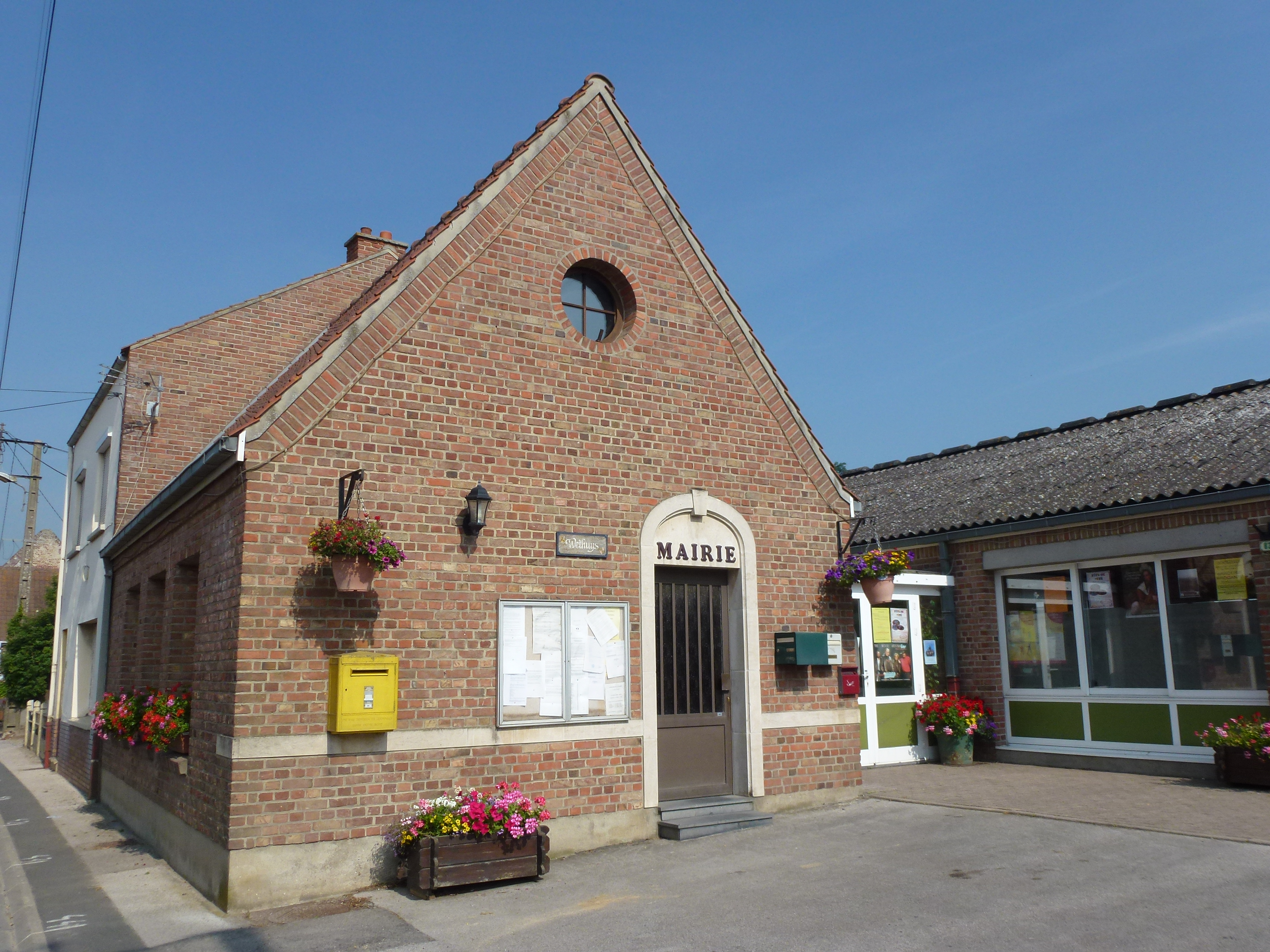
- The town hall in Wemaers-Cappel

- Coat of arms
- Location of Wemaers-Cappel
- Location within France Location within Hauts-de-France
- Coordinates: 50°48′29″N 2°26′19″E
- Country: France
- Region: Hauts-de-France
- Department: Nord
- Arrondissement: Dunkerque
- Canton: Wormhout
- Intercommunality: CA Cœur de Flandre

Government
  - Mayor (2020–2026): Laurence Barrois
- Area^{1}: 4.13 km^{2} (1.59 sq mi)
- Elevation: 37 m (121 ft)
- Highest elevation: 75 m (246 ft)
- Lowest elevation: 30 m (98 ft)
- Population (2023): 225
  - Density: 54.5/km^{2} (141/sq mi)
- Demonym: Wemaers-Cappelois (es)
- Time zone: UTC+01:00 (CET)
  - Summer (DST): UTC+02:00 (CEST)
- INSEE/Postal code: 59655 /59670
- ^{1} French Land Register data, which excludes lakes, ponds, glaciers > 1 km^{2} (0.386 sq mi or 247 acres) and river estuaries.

Wemaers-Cappel (French pronunciation: [wemaʁs kapɛl]; Dutch: Wemaarskappel) is a commune in the Nord department in northern France.

== Heraldry ==
Arms of Wemaers-Cappe	The arms of Wemaers-Cappe are blazoned : Quarterly 1&4: Azure, a wyvern Or armed and langued gules; 2&3: Argent, 3 chevrons gules.

== Population ==
Historical population
Year	Pop.	±% p.a.
1968	255	—
1975	198	−3.55%
1982	198	+0.00%
1990	186	−0.78%
1999	230	+2.39%
2007	253	+1.20%
2012	249	−0.32%
2017	252	+0.24%
2023	225	−1.87%
Source: INSEE

== See also ==
- Communes of the Nord department
