= Saint-Pierre-Brouck =

Saint-Pierre-Brouck Sint-Pietersbroek
- Commune
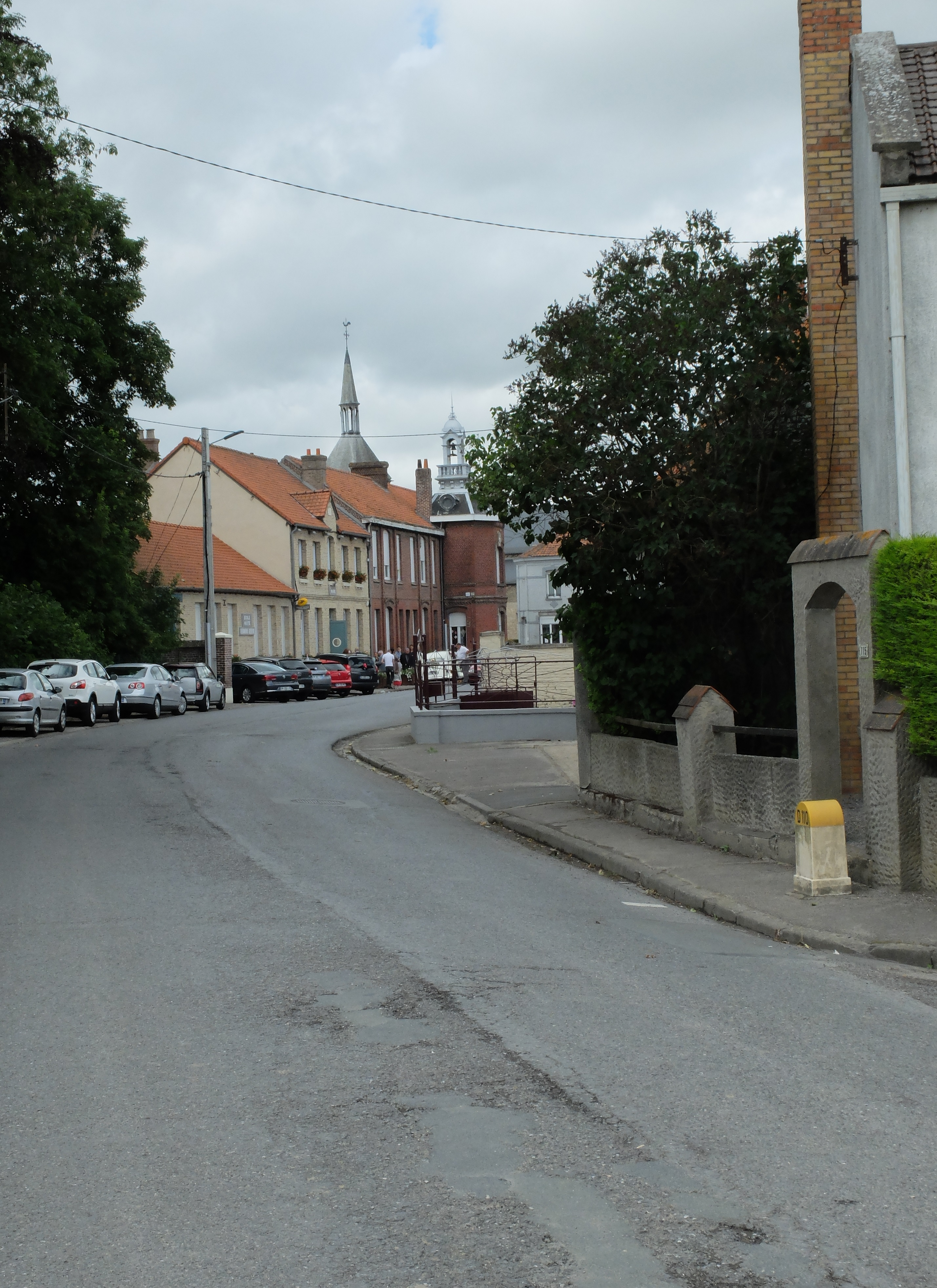
- A view within Saint-Pierre-Brouck

- Coat of arms
- Location of Saint-Pierre-Brouck
- Location within France Location within Hauts-de-France
- Coordinates: 50°53′47″N 2°11′14″E
- Country: France
- Region: Hauts-de-France
- Department: Nord
- Arrondissement: Dunkerque
- Canton: Grande-Synthe
- Intercommunality: Hauts de Flandre

Government
  - Mayor (2020–2026): Gérard Grondel
- Area^{1}: 8.86 km^{2} (3.42 sq mi)
- Elevation: 3 m (9.8 ft)
- Highest elevation: 5 m (16 ft)
- Lowest elevation: 1 m (3.3 ft)
- Population (2023): 989
  - Density: 112/km^{2} (289/sq mi)
- Time zone: UTC+01:00 (CET)
  - Summer (DST): UTC+02:00 (CEST)
- INSEE/Postal code: 59539 /59630
- ^{1} French Land Register data, which excludes lakes, ponds, glaciers > 1 km^{2} (0.386 sq mi or 247 acres) and river estuaries.

Saint-Pierre-Brouck (French pronunciation: [sɛ̃ pjɛʁ bʁuk]; from Dutch Sint-Pietersbroek, meaning "Saint-Peter marsh"; West Flemish: Sint-Pieters-Broek) ) is a commune in the Nord department in northern France.

== Heraldry ==
Arms of Saint-Pierre-Brouck	The arms of Saint-Pierre-Brouck are blazoned : Sable, 4 keys argent. (Leers and Saint-Pierre-Brouck use the same arms.)

== See also ==
- Communes of the Nord department
