= Drincham =

Drincham Drinkam
- Commune
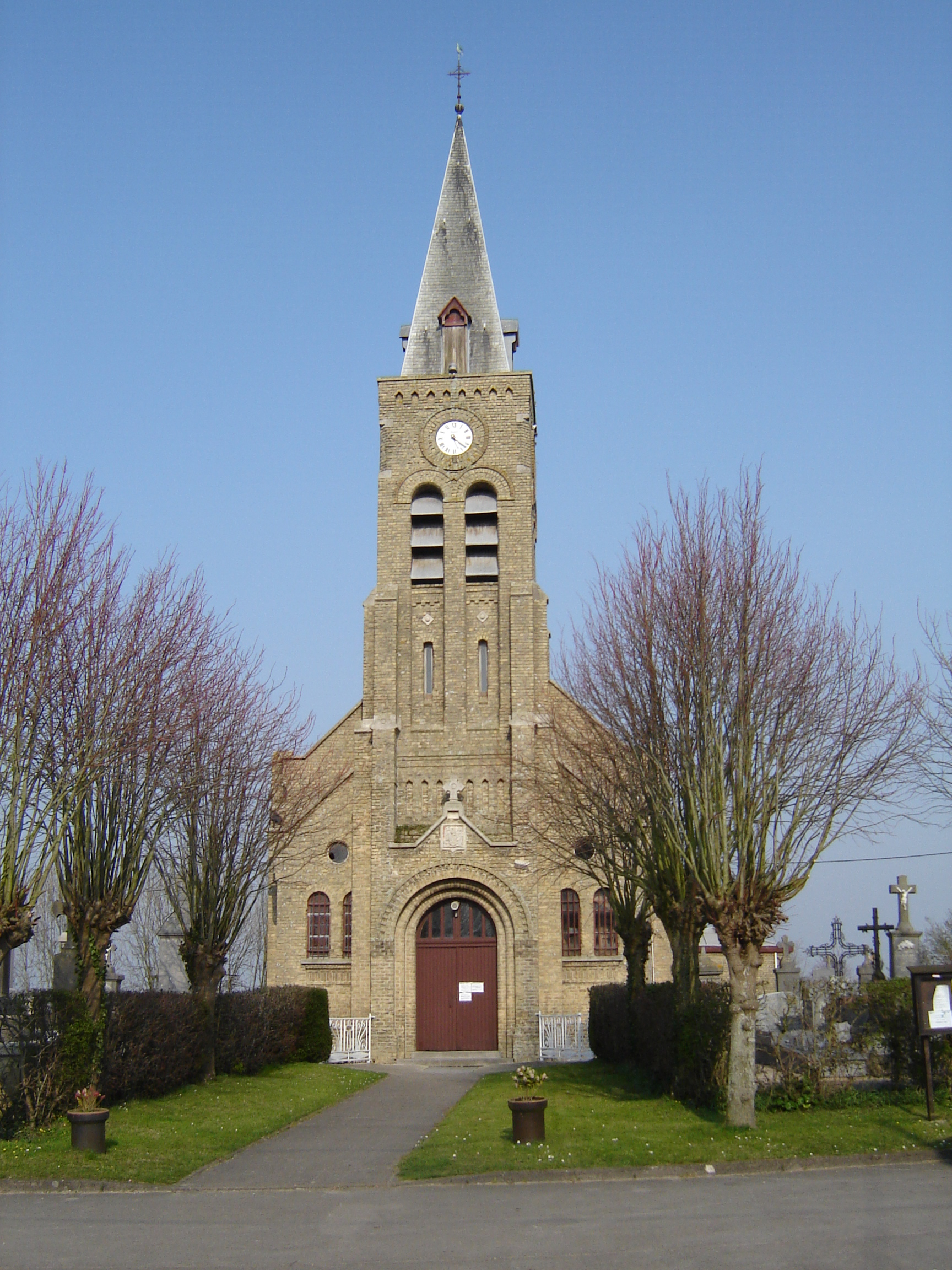
- Saint-Wandrille church in Drincham

- Coat of arms
- Location of Drincham
- Location within France Location within Hauts-de-France
- Coordinates: 50°54′24″N 2°18′36″E
- Country: France
- Region: Hauts-de-France
- Department: Nord
- Arrondissement: Dunkerque
- Canton: Grande-Synthe
- Intercommunality: CC Hauts de Flandre

Government
  - Mayor (2020–2026): Patrick Thoor
- Area^{1}: 3.38 km^{2} (1.31 sq mi)
- Elevation: 11 m (36 ft)
- Highest elevation: 15 m (49 ft)
- Lowest elevation: 1 m (3.3 ft)
- Population (2023): 281
  - Density: 83.1/km^{2} (215/sq mi)
- Demonym: Drinchamois (es)
- Time zone: UTC+01:00 (CET)
  - Summer (DST): UTC+02:00 (CEST)
- INSEE/Postal code: 59182 /59630
- ^{1} French Land Register data, which excludes lakes, ponds, glaciers > 1 km^{2} (0.386 sq mi or 247 acres) and river estuaries.

Drincham (French pronunciation: [dʁɛ̃kam]; from Flemish; Drinkam in modern Dutch spelling) is a commune in the Nord department in northern France.

Drincham is about 15 km (9.3 mi) south of Dunkirk.

== Heraldry ==
Arms of Drincham	The arms of Drincham are blazoned : Chequy argent and azure, a bordure gules.

== Village limits ==
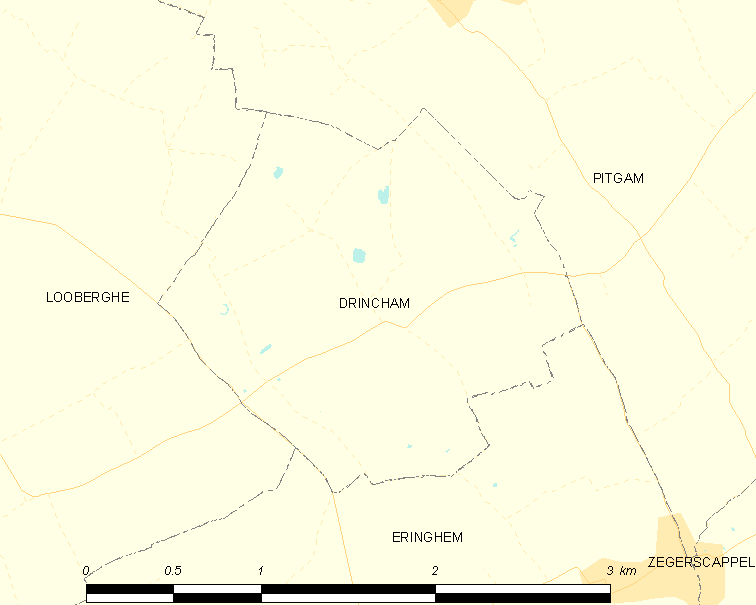
Map

== See also ==
- Communes of the Nord department
