= Zermezeele =

Zermezeele Zermezele
- Commune
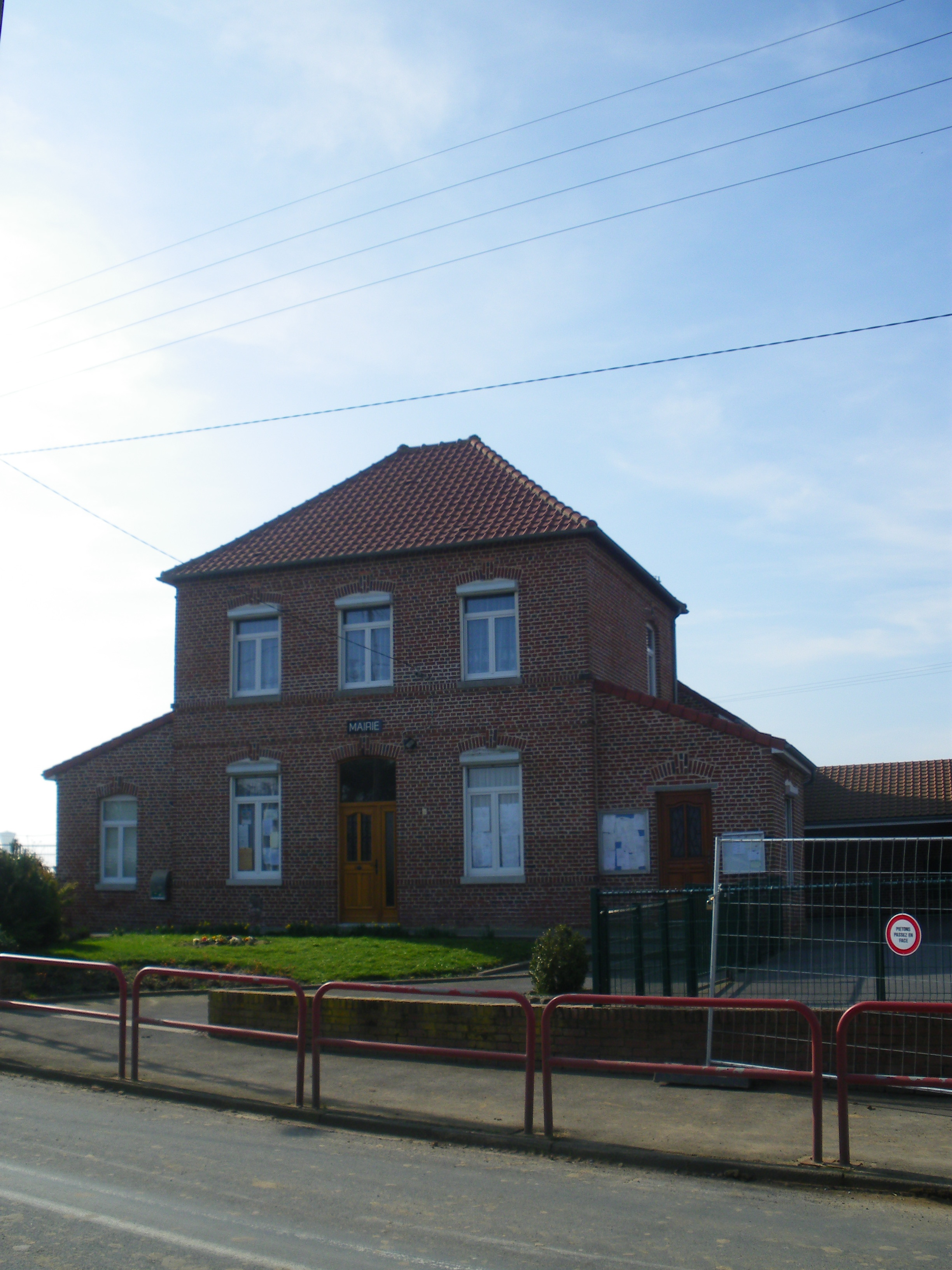
- The town hall in Zermezeele

- Coat of arms
- Location of Zermezeele
- Location within France Location within Hauts-de-France
- Coordinates: 50°49′31″N 2°27′03″E
- Country: France
- Region: Hauts-de-France
- Department: Nord
- Arrondissement: Dunkerque
- Canton: Wormhout
- Intercommunality: CA Cœur de Flandre

Government
  - Mayor (2020–2026): Émidia Koch
- Area^{1}: 4.83 km^{2} (1.86 sq mi)
- Elevation: 25 m (82 ft)
- Highest elevation: 54 m (177 ft)
- Lowest elevation: 14 m (46 ft)
- Population (2023): 252
  - Density: 52.2/km^{2} (135/sq mi)
- Demonym(s): Zermezeelois, Zermezeeloises
- Time zone: UTC+01:00 (CET)
  - Summer (DST): UTC+02:00 (CEST)
- INSEE/Postal code: 59667 /59670
- ^{1} French Land Register data, which excludes lakes, ponds, glaciers > 1 km^{2} (0.386 sq mi or 247 acres) and river estuaries.

Zermezeele (French pronunciation: [zɛʁməzɛl]; Dutch: Zermezele) is a commune in the Nord department in northern France.

The northern border between Ledringhem and Zermezeele is marked by the river Peene Becque.

== Population ==
Historical population

Year	Pop.	±% p.a.
1793	373	—
1821	404	+0.29%
1846	413	+0.09%
1872	373	−0.39%
1901	345	−0.27%
1926	266	−1.03%
1946	264	−0.04%
1962	231	−0.83%
1968	196	−2.70%

Year	Pop.	±% p.a.
1975	161	−2.77%
1982	137	−2.28%
1990	167	+2.51%
1999	178	+0.71%
2007	193	+1.02%
2012	198	+0.51%
2017	223	+2.41%
2023	252	+2.06%

Source: EHESS (1793-1999) and INSEE

== Heraldry ==
Arms of Zermezeele	The arms of Zermezeele are blazoned : Argent, a chief gules, overall a bendlet sable.

== See also ==
- Communes of the Nord department
