= Steenvoorde =

- Commune
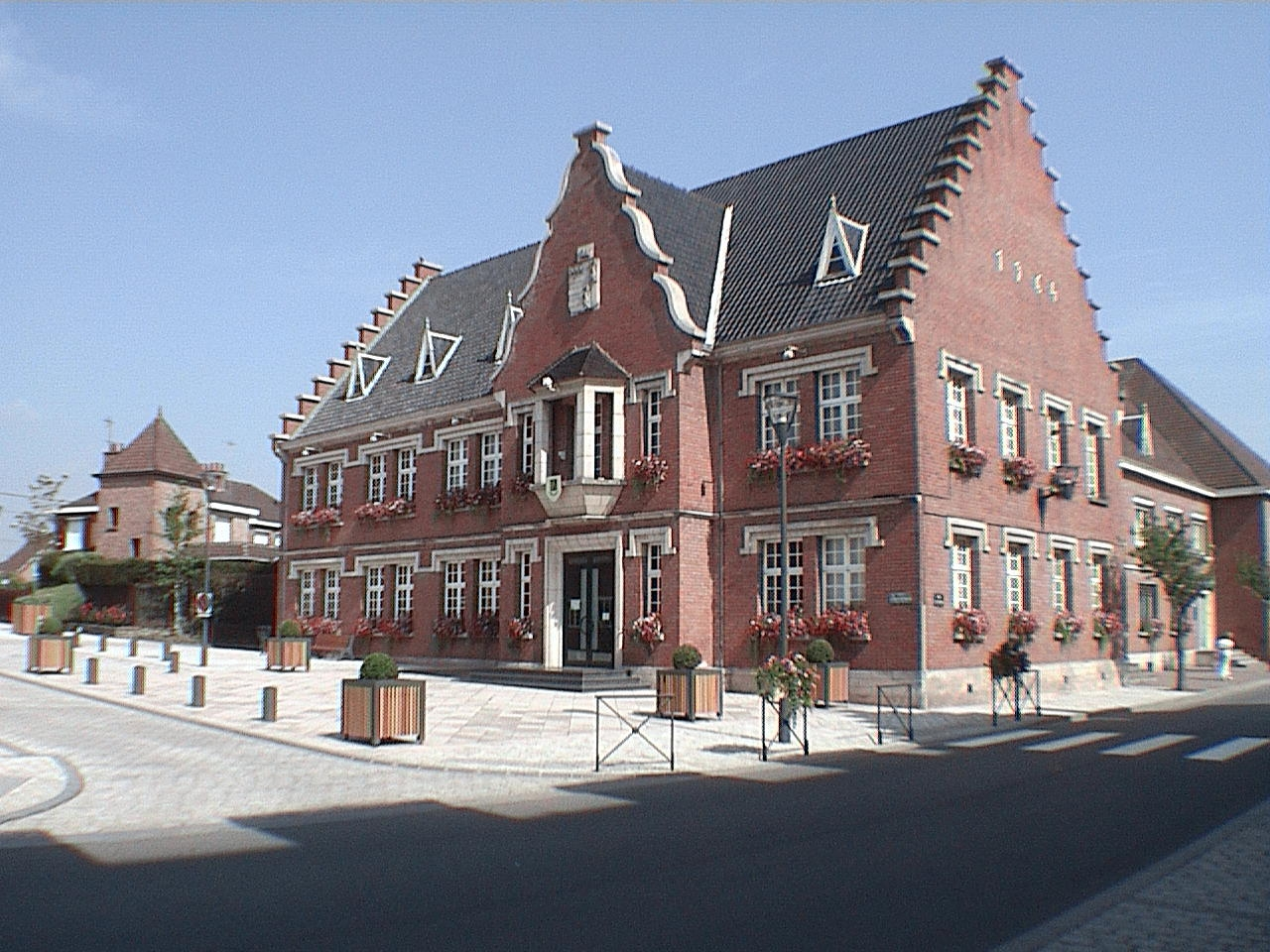
- Town hall

- Coat of arms
- Location of Steenvoorde
- Location within France Location within Hauts-de-France
- Coordinates: 50°48′40″N 2°34′53″E
- Country: France
- Region: Hauts-de-France
- Department: Nord
- Arrondissement: Dunkerque
- Canton: Wormhout
- Intercommunality: CA Cœur de Flandre

Government
  - Mayor (2020–2026): Jean-Pierre Bataille
- Area^{1}: 29.82 km^{2} (11.51 sq mi)
- Elevation: 25 m (82 ft)
- Highest elevation: 67 m (220 ft)
- Lowest elevation: 8 m (26 ft)
- Population (2023): 4,332
  - Density: 145.3/km^{2} (376.3/sq mi)
- Demonym: Steenvoordois
- Time zone: UTC+01:00 (CET)
  - Summer (DST): UTC+02:00 (CEST)
- INSEE/Postal code: 59580 /59114
- ^{1} French Land Register data, which excludes lakes, ponds, glaciers > 1 km^{2} (0.386 sq mi or 247 acres) and river estuaries.

Steenvoorde (French pronunciation: [stɛ̃vɔʁd]) is a commune in the Nord department in northern France. Once part of the Seventeen Provinces of the Low Countries, Steenvoorde was the site of the beginning of the Beeldenstorm, or "Iconoclastic Fury." Today the city is known for its Géants du Nord, sculptures of giants that can be admired in summer festivals.

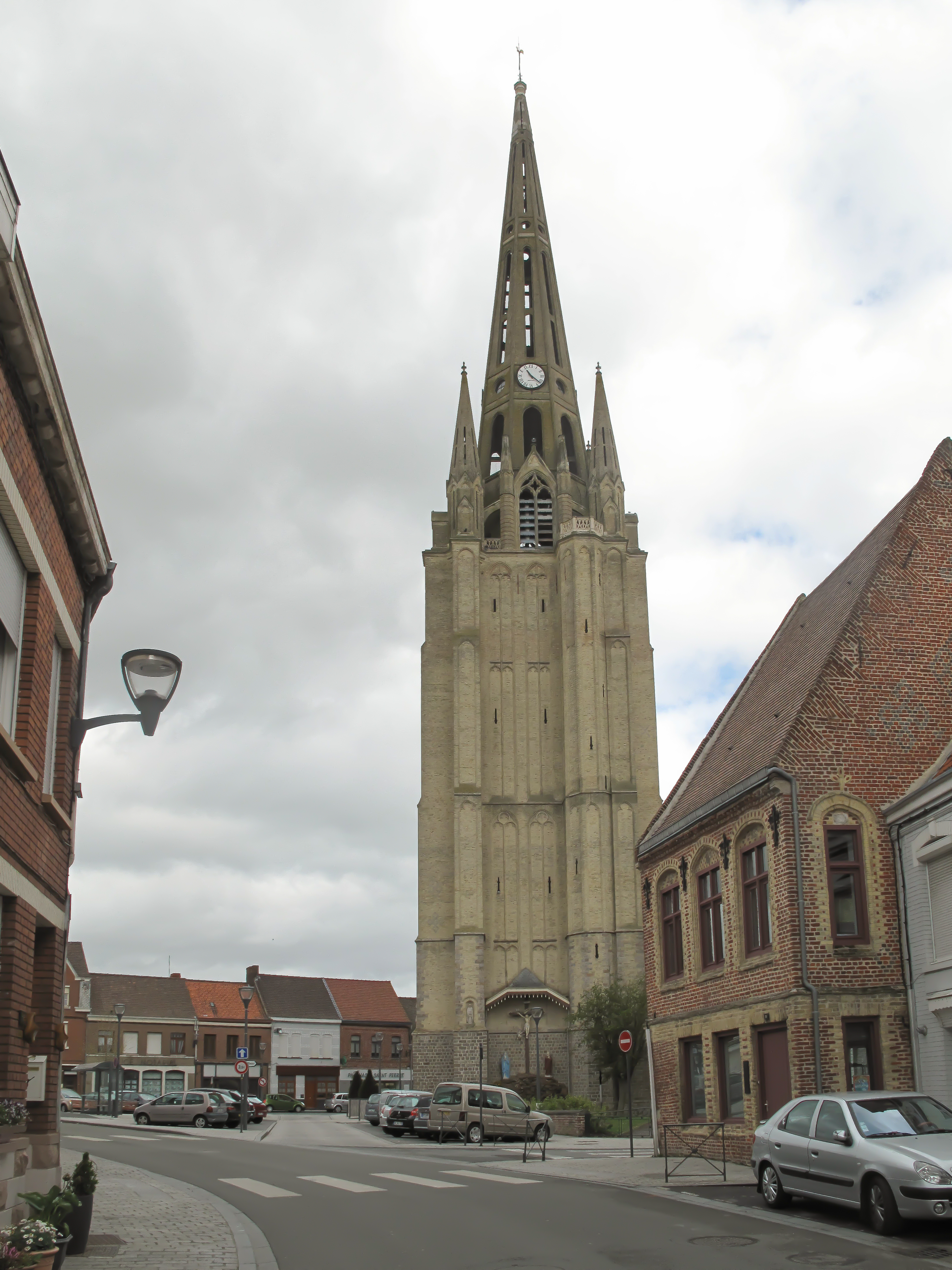
Steenvoorde, church: église Saint Pierre

== Geography ==
=== Climate ===
Steenvoorde has an oceanic climate (Köppen climate classification Cfb). The average annual temperature in Steenvoorde is 11.2 °C (52.2 °F). The average annual rainfall is 727.8 mm (28.65 in) with November as the wettest month. The temperatures are highest on average in July, at around 18.5 °C (65.3 °F), and lowest in January, at around 4.5 °C (40.1 °F). The highest temperature ever recorded in Steenvoorde was 40.8 °C (105.4 °F) on 25 July 2019; the coldest temperature ever recorded was −13.4 °C (7.9 °F) on 4 February 2012.

Climate data for Steenvoorde (1991−2020 normals, extremes 2004−present)
| Month | Jan | Feb | Mar | Apr | May | Jun | Jul | Aug | Sep | Oct | Nov | Dec | Year |
|---|---|---|---|---|---|---|---|---|---|---|---|---|---|
| Record high °C (°F) | 15.3 (59.5) | 18.3 (64.9) | 24.1 (75.4) | 26.3 (79.3) | 31.8 (89.2) | 33.5 (92.3) | 40.8 (105.4) | 34.9 (94.8) | 33.3 (91.9) | 28.8 (83.8) | 19.9 (67.8) | 14.8 (58.6) | 40.8 (105.4) |
| Mean daily maximum °C (°F) | 6.8 (44.2) | 7.3 (45.1) | 10.5 (50.9) | 15.0 (59.0) | 17.8 (64.0) | 20.8 (69.4) | 23.5 (74.3) | 22.9 (73.2) | 20.4 (68.7) | 15.7 (60.3) | 10.6 (51.1) | 7.5 (45.5) | 14.9 (58.8) |
| Daily mean °C (°F) | 4.5 (40.1) | 4.7 (40.5) | 7.0 (44.6) | 10.4 (50.7) | 13.3 (55.9) | 16.2 (61.2) | 18.5 (65.3) | 18.2 (64.8) | 16.0 (60.8) | 12.5 (54.5) | 8.1 (46.6) | 5.2 (41.4) | 11.2 (52.2) |
| Mean daily minimum °C (°F) | 2.2 (36.0) | 2.0 (35.6) | 3.5 (38.3) | 5.7 (42.3) | 8.8 (47.8) | 11.6 (52.9) | 13.5 (56.3) | 13.5 (56.3) | 11.6 (52.9) | 9.2 (48.6) | 5.5 (41.9) | 2.9 (37.2) | 7.5 (45.5) |
| Record low °C (°F) | −10.9 (12.4) | −13.4 (7.9) | −6.8 (19.8) | −2.6 (27.3) | 1.0 (33.8) | 4.9 (40.8) | 7.4 (45.3) | 7.8 (46.0) | 3.2 (37.8) | −0.1 (31.8) | −4.4 (24.1) | −9.6 (14.7) | −13.4 (7.9) |
| Average precipitation mm (inches) | 51.0 (2.01) | 54.0 (2.13) | 49.0 (1.93) | 32.6 (1.28) | 51.0 (2.01) | 52.5 (2.07) | 67.8 (2.67) | 81.6 (3.21) | 55.0 (2.17) | 70.0 (2.76) | 86.5 (3.41) | 76.8 (3.02) | 727.8 (28.65) |
| Average precipitation days (≥ 1.0 mm) | 11.1 | 10.5 | 9.5 | 7.2 | 9.3 | 7.7 | 9.4 | 10.7 | 8.0 | 10.9 | 13.6 | 13.1 | 120.9 |
Source: Météo-France

== Population ==
Historical population
| Year | Pop. | ±% p.a. |
|---|---|---|
| 1968 | 3,761 | — |
| 1975 | 3,879 | +0.44% |
| 1982 | 4,021 | +0.51% |
| 1990 | 4,010 | −0.03% |
| 1999 | 4,024 | +0.04% |
| 2007 | 3,987 | −0.12% |
| 2012 | 4,030 | +0.21% |
| 2017 | 4,368 | +1.62% |
| 2023 | 4,332 | −0.14% |
Source: INSEE

== Heraldry ==
| Arms of Steenvoorde | The arms of Steenvoorde are blazoned : Barry Or and azure, in chief in fess 3 annulets impaled with Quarterly 2&4: Or, 3 ?pallets couped? sable within a bordure engrailed azure; 2&3: Barry argent and azure, a lion sable. |

== See also ==
- Communes of the Nord department
