= Bissezeele =

Bissezeele Bissezele
- Commune
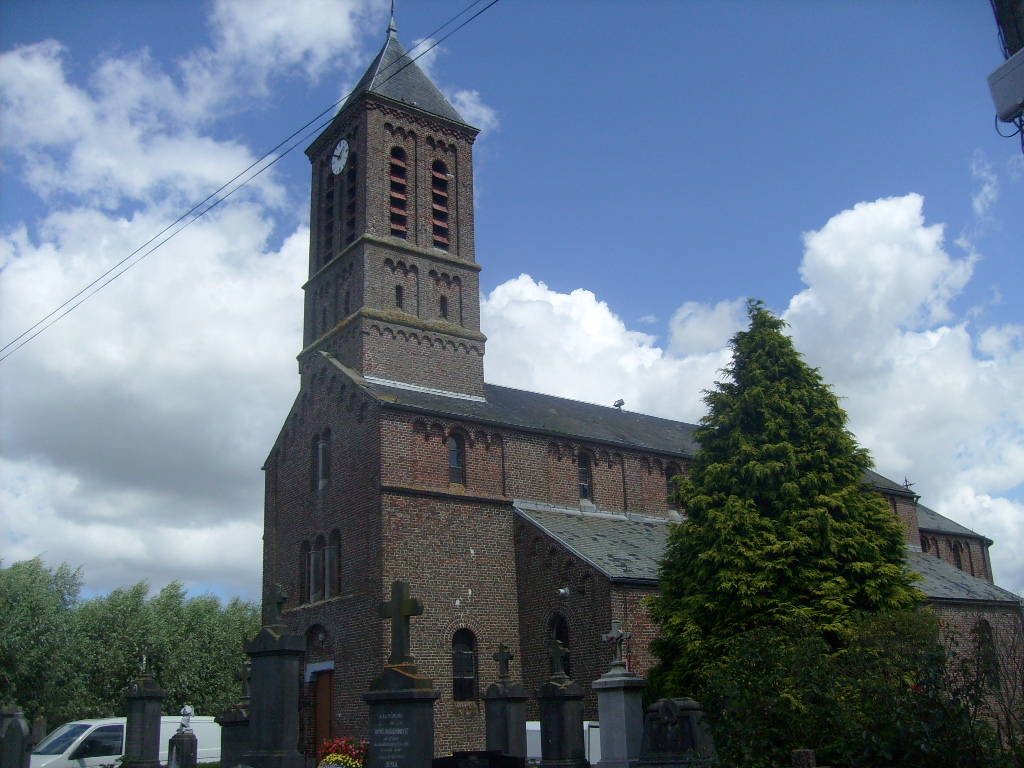
- The church in Bissezeele

- Coat of arms
- Location of Bissezeele
- Location within France Location within Hauts-de-France
- Coordinates: 50°54′44″N 2°24′39″E
- Country: France
- Region: Hauts-de-France
- Department: Nord
- Arrondissement: Dunkerque
- Canton: Wormhout
- Intercommunality: CC Hauts de Flandre

Government
  - Mayor (2020–2026): Claudine Delassus
- Area^{1}: 3.57 km^{2} (1.38 sq mi)
- Elevation: 24 m (79 ft)
- Highest elevation: 31 m (102 ft)
- Lowest elevation: 14 m (46 ft)
- Population (2023): 239
  - Density: 66.9/km^{2} (173/sq mi)
- Time zone: UTC+01:00 (CET)
  - Summer (DST): UTC+02:00 (CEST)
- INSEE/Postal code: 59083 /59380
- ^{1} French Land Register data, which excludes lakes, ponds, glaciers > 1 km^{2} (0.386 sq mi or 247 acres) and river estuaries.

Bissezeele (French pronunciation: [bisəzɛl]; from Dutch; Bissezele in modern Dutch spelling) is a commune in the Nord department in northern France.

== Population ==
Historical population
Year	Pop.	±% p.a.
1968	199	—
1975	166	−2.56%
1982	161	−0.44%
1990	178	+1.26%
1999	174	−0.25%
2007	189	+1.04%
2012	228	+3.82%
2017	247	+1.61%
2023	239	−0.55%
Source: INSEE

== Images ==
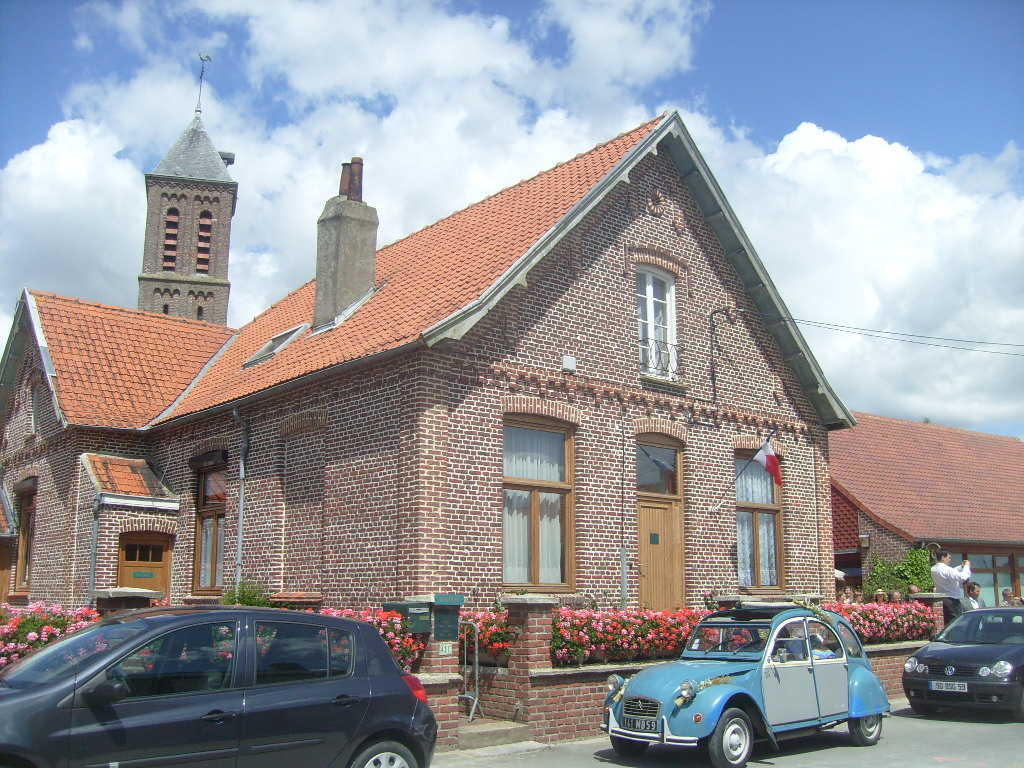
Town hall

== Heraldry ==
Arms of Bissezeele	The arms of Bissezeele are blazoned : Or, a lion sable langued gules, crowned Or, wearing a collar with a pendant cross Or.

== See also ==
- Communes of the Nord department
