= Crochte =

- Commune
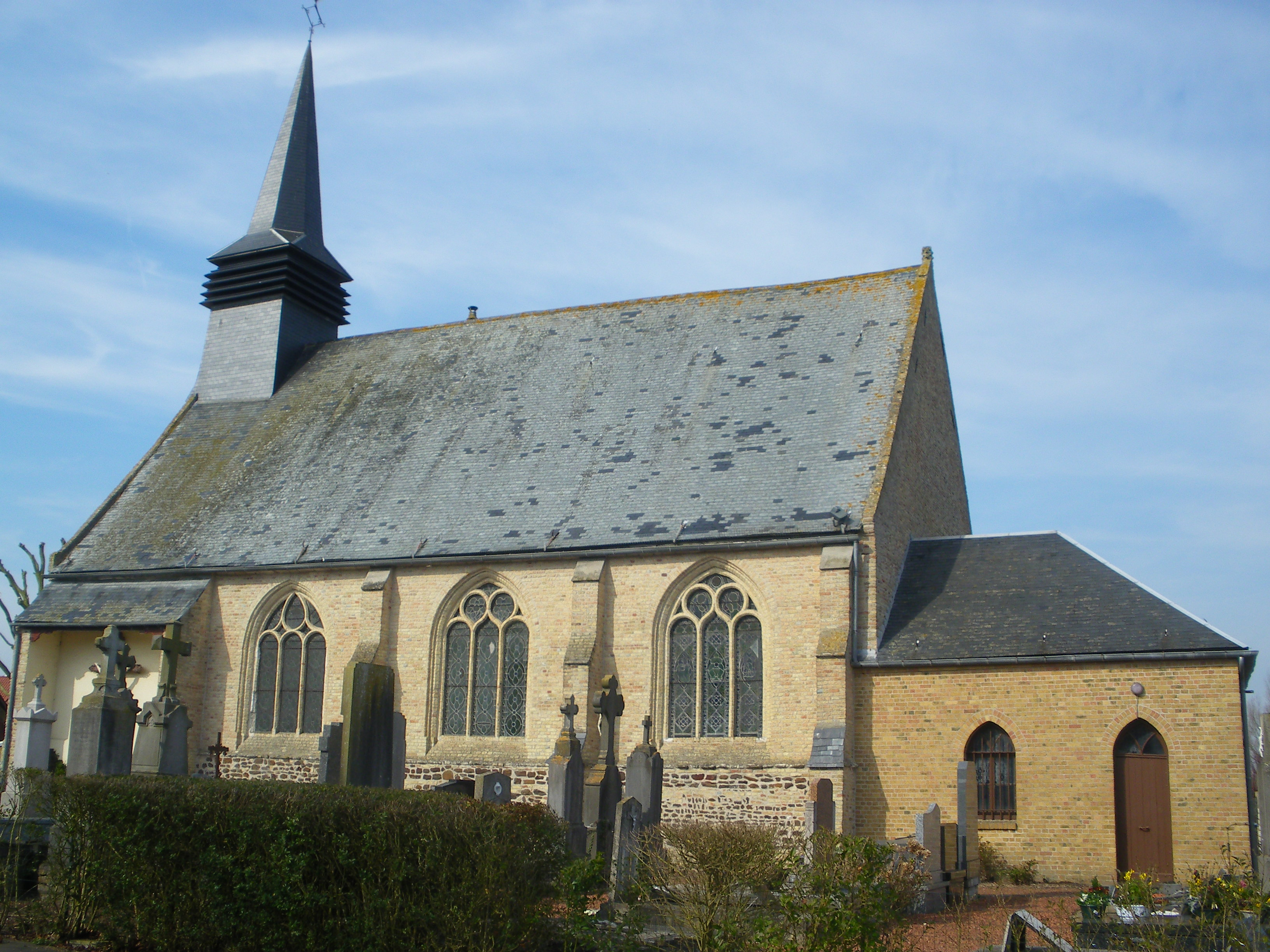
- The church in Crochte

- Coat of arms
- Location of Crochte
- Location within France Location within Hauts-de-France
- Coordinates: 50°56′08″N 2°23′22″E
- Country: France
- Region: Hauts-de-France
- Department: Nord
- Arrondissement: Dunkerque
- Canton: Wormhout
- Intercommunality: CC Hauts de Flandre

Government
  - Mayor (2020–2026): Stéphane Colaert
- Area^{1}: 7.83 km^{2} (3.02 sq mi)
- Elevation: 9 m (30 ft)
- Highest elevation: 32 m (105 ft)
- Lowest elevation: 4 m (13 ft)
- Population (2023): 659
  - Density: 84.2/km^{2} (218/sq mi)
- Demonym: Crochtois (es)
- Time zone: UTC+01:00 (CET)
  - Summer (DST): UTC+02:00 (CEST)
- INSEE/Postal code: 59162 /59380
- ^{1} French Land Register data, which excludes lakes, ponds, glaciers > 1 km^{2} (0.386 sq mi or 247 acres) and river estuaries.

Crochte (French pronunciation: [kʁɔkt]; Dutch: Krochte) is a commune in the Nord department in northern France.

== Heraldry ==
Arms of Crochte	The arms of Crochte are blazoned : Sable, a lion Or.

== See also ==
- Communes of the Nord department
