= Cappelle-Brouck =

Cappelle-Brouck Kapellebroek
- Commune
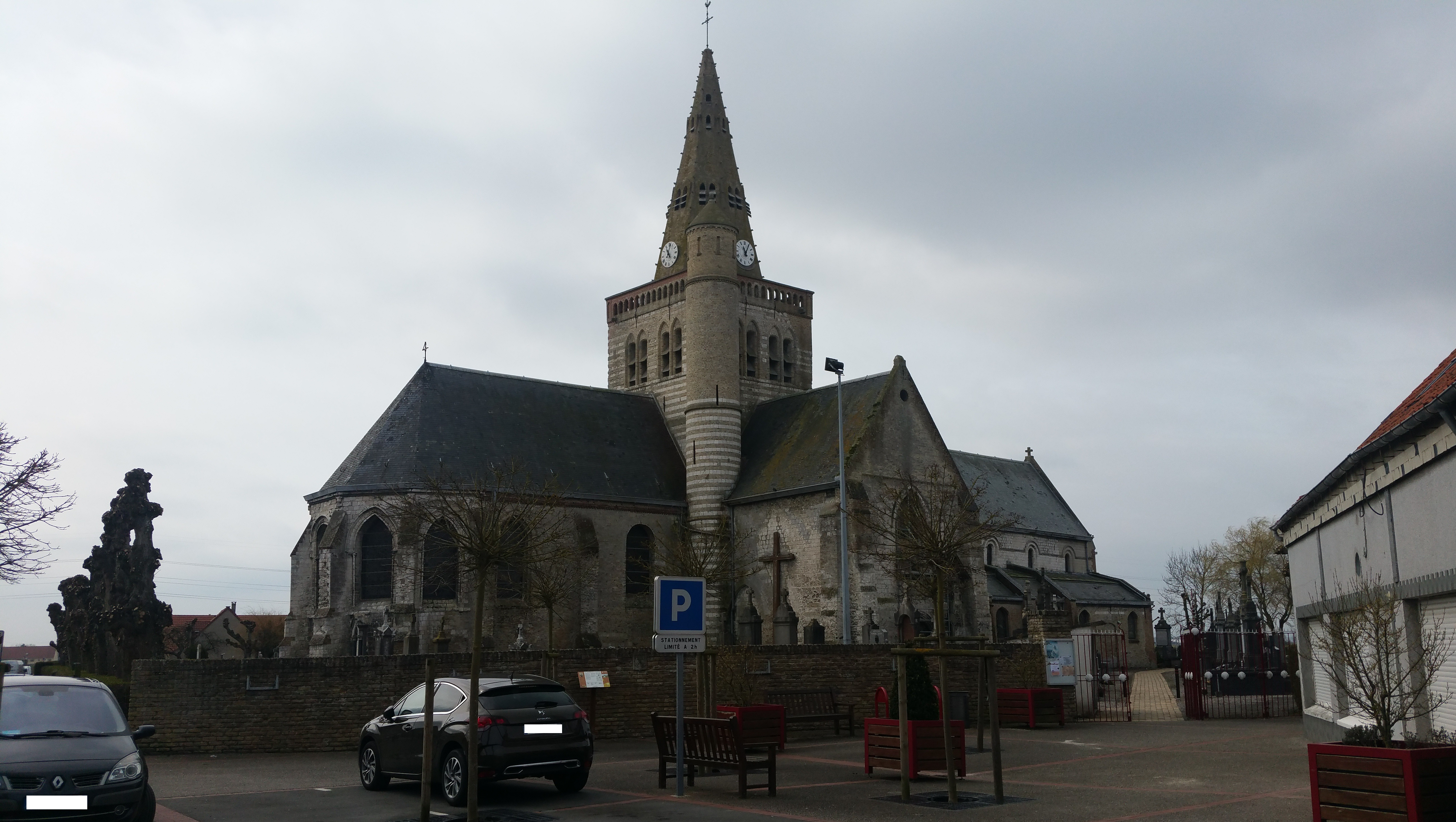
- The church in Cappelle-Brouck

- Coat of arms
- Location of Cappelle-Brouck
- Location within France Location within Hauts-de-France
- Coordinates: 50°54′09″N 2°13′24″E
- Country: France
- Region: Hauts-de-France
- Department: Nord
- Arrondissement: Dunkerque
- Canton: Grande-Synthe
- Intercommunality: Hauts de Flandre

Government
  - Mayor (2020–2026): Michel Decool
- Area^{1}: 17.55 km^{2} (6.78 sq mi)
- Elevation: 2 m (6.6 ft)
- Highest elevation: 4 m (13 ft)
- Lowest elevation: 0 m (0 ft)
- Population (2023): 1,169
  - Density: 66.61/km^{2} (172.5/sq mi)
- Demonym: Cappellebrouckois (es)
- Time zone: UTC+01:00 (CET)
  - Summer (DST): UTC+02:00 (CEST)
- INSEE/Postal code: 59130 /59630
- ^{1} French Land Register data, which excludes lakes, ponds, glaciers > 1 km^{2} (0.386 sq mi or 247 acres) and river estuaries.

Cappelle-Brouck (French pronunciation: [kapɛl bʁuk]; from Dutch meaning "chapel marsh"; Kapellebroek in modern Dutch spelling) is a commune in the Nord department in northern France.

== Heraldry ==
Arms of Cappelle-Brouck	The arms of Cappelle-Brouck are blazoned : Gules, 2 keys addorsed in saltire argent.

== See also ==
- Communes of the Nord department
