= Rexpoëde =

Rexpoëde Rekspoede
- Commune
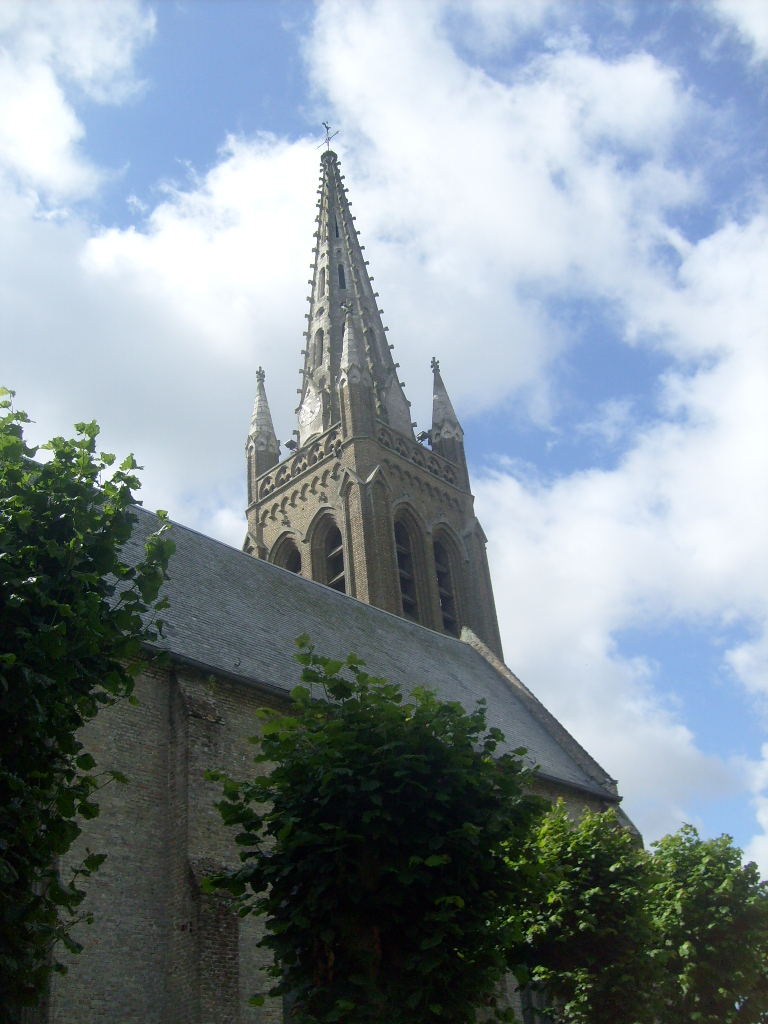
- The church in Rexpoëde

- Coat of arms
- Location of Rexpoëde
- Location within France Location within Hauts-de-France
- Coordinates: 50°56′23″N 2°32′27″E
- Country: France
- Region: Hauts-de-France
- Department: Nord
- Arrondissement: Dunkerque
- Canton: Wormhout
- Intercommunality: CC Hauts de Flandre

Government
  - Mayor (2020–2026): Bruno Brongniart
- Area^{1}: 13.37 km^{2} (5.16 sq mi)
- Elevation: 20 m (66 ft)
- Highest elevation: 24 m (79 ft)
- Lowest elevation: 7 m (23 ft)
- Population (2023): 1,976
  - Density: 147.8/km^{2} (382.8/sq mi)
- Demonym: Rexpoëdois (es)
- Time zone: UTC+01:00 (CET)
  - Summer (DST): UTC+02:00 (CEST)
- INSEE/Postal code: 59499 /59122
- ^{1} French Land Register data, which excludes lakes, ponds, glaciers > 1 km^{2} (0.386 sq mi or 247 acres) and river estuaries.

Rexpoëde (French pronunciation: [ʁɛkspud]; from Flemish; Rekspoede in modern Dutch spelling) is a commune in the Nord department in northern France.

It is 15 km (9.3 mi) southeast of Dunkirk.

== Population ==
Historical population
Year	Pop.	±% p.a.
1968	1,154	—
1975	1,167	+0.16%
1982	1,384	+2.47%
1990	1,534	+1.29%
1999	1,546	+0.09%
2007	1,754	+1.59%
2012	2,011	+2.77%
2017	2,001	−0.10%
2023	1,976	−0.21%
Source: INSEE

== Heraldry ==
Arms of Rexpoëde	The arms of Rexpoëde are blazoned : Argent, a fess sable, on a canton Or a lion sable within a bordure gules.

== See also ==
- Communes of the Nord department
