= Zegerscappel =

Zegerscappel Zegerskappel
- Commune
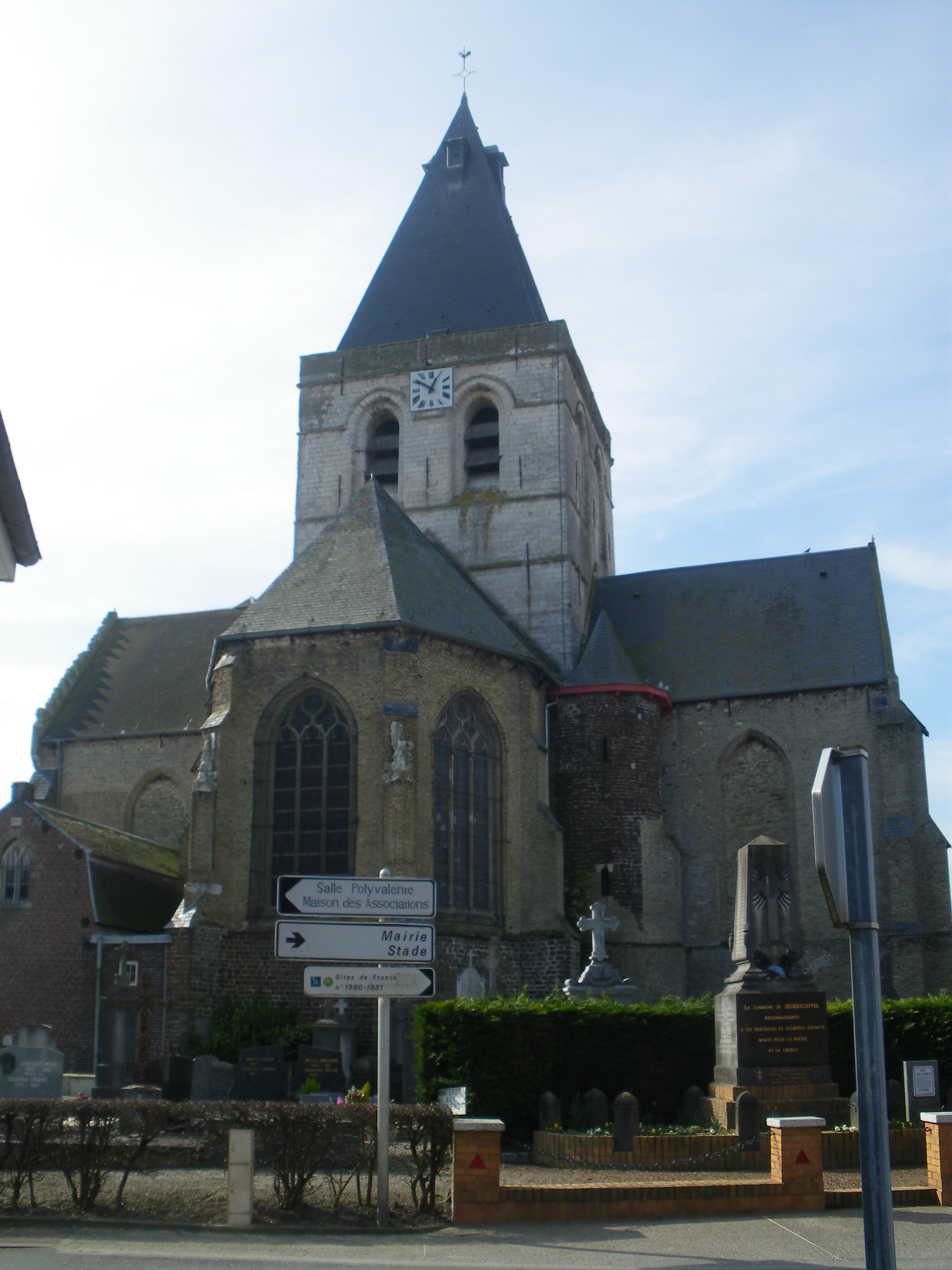
- The church in Zegerscappel

- Coat of arms
- Location of Zegerscappel
- Location within France Location within Hauts-de-France
- Coordinates: 50°53′16″N 2°23′02″E
- Country: France
- Region: Hauts-de-France
- Department: Nord
- Arrondissement: Dunkerque
- Canton: Wormhout
- Intercommunality: Hauts de Flandre

Government
  - Mayor (2024–2026): Franck Spicht
- Area^{1}: 17.4 km^{2} (6.7 sq mi)
- Elevation: 30 m (98 ft)
- Highest elevation: 40 m (130 ft)
- Lowest elevation: 7 m (23 ft)
- Population (2023): 1,562
  - Density: 89.8/km^{2} (233/sq mi)
- Demonym(s): Zegerscappelois, Zegerscappeloises
- Time zone: UTC+01:00 (CET)
  - Summer (DST): UTC+02:00 (CEST)
- INSEE/Postal code: 59666 /59470
- ^{1} French Land Register data, which excludes lakes, ponds, glaciers > 1 km^{2} (0.386 sq mi or 247 acres) and river estuaries.

Zegerscappel (French pronunciation: [zeɡɛʁskapɛl]; from Dutch; Zegerskappel in modern Dutch spelling) is a commune in the Nord department in northern France.

It is 15 km (9 mi) south of Dunkerque.

== Heraldry ==
Arms of Zegerscappel

== Population ==
Historical population

Year	Pop.	±% p.a.
1793	1,650	—
1800	1,707	+0.49%
1806	1,769	+0.60%
1821	1,823	+0.20%
1831	1,775	−0.27%
1836	1,805	+0.34%
1841	1,875	+0.76%
1846	1,746	−1.42%
1851	1,709	−0.43%
1856	1,702	−0.08%
1861	1,739	+0.43%
1866	1,768	+0.33%
1872	1,762	−0.06%
1876	1,771	+0.13%
1881	1,699	−0.83%
1886	1,608	−1.09%
1891	1,568	−0.50%
1896	1,545	−0.30%
1901	1,535	−0.13%

Year	Pop.	±% p.a.
1906	1,611	+0.97%
1911	1,497	−1.46%
1921	1,400	−0.67%
1926	1,367	−0.48%
1931	1,341	−0.38%
1936	1,306	−0.53%
1946	1,344	+0.29%
1954	1,242	−0.98%
1962	1,193	−0.50%
1968	1,202	+0.13%
1975	1,208	+0.07%
1982	1,179	−0.35%
1990	1,252	+0.75%
1999	1,200	−0.47%
2007	1,493	+2.77%
2012	1,513	+0.27%
2017	1,529	+0.21%
2023	1,562	+0.36%

Source: EHESS (1793-1999) and INSEE

== See also ==
- Communes of the Nord department
