= Brouckerque =

Brouckerque Broekkerke
- Commune
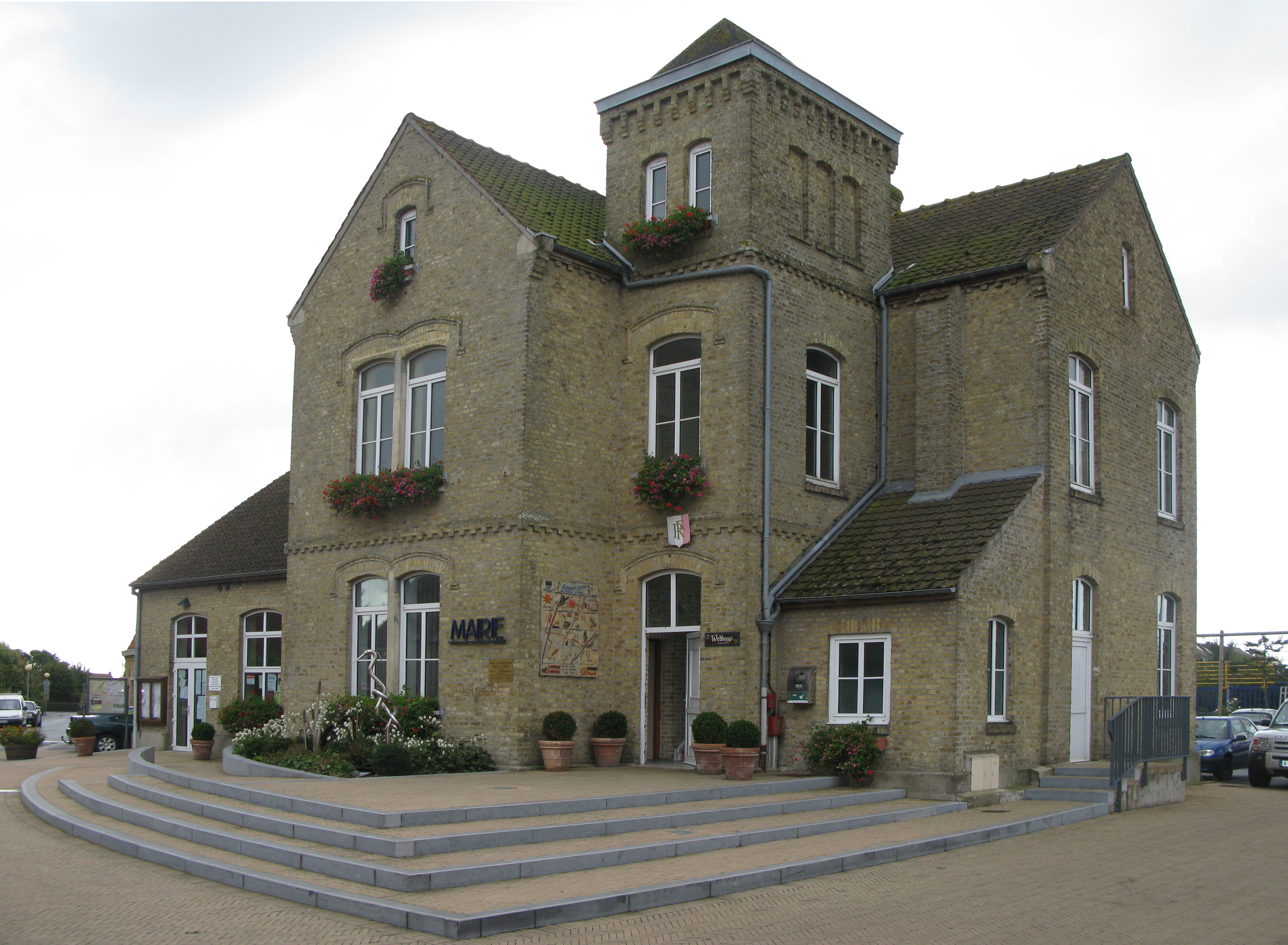
- The town hall in Brouckerque

- Coat of arms
- Location of Brouckerque
- Location within France Location within Hauts-de-France
- Coordinates: 50°57′15″N 2°17′34″E
- Country: France
- Region: Hauts-de-France
- Department: Nord
- Arrondissement: Dunkerque
- Canton: Grande-Synthe
- Intercommunality: Hauts de Flandre

Government
  - Mayor (2023–2026): Guy Pruvost
- Area^{1}: 11.91 km^{2} (4.60 sq mi)
- Elevation: 2 m (6.6 ft)
- Highest elevation: 8 m (26 ft)
- Lowest elevation: 0 m (0 ft)
- Population (2023): 1,452
  - Density: 121.9/km^{2} (315.8/sq mi)
- Time zone: UTC+01:00 (CET)
  - Summer (DST): UTC+02:00 (CEST)
- INSEE/Postal code: 59110 /59630
- ^{1} French Land Register data, which excludes lakes, ponds, glaciers > 1 km^{2} (0.386 sq mi or 247 acres) and river estuaries.

Brouckerque (French pronunciation: [bʁukɛʁk]; from Dutch: Broekkerke meaning "marsh church") is a commune in the Nord department in northern France.

== Population ==
Historical population
Year	Pop.	±% p.a.
1968	665	—
1975	924	+4.81%
1982	1,064	+2.04%
1990	1,168	+1.17%
1999	1,165	−0.03%
2007	1,283	+1.21%
2012	1,272	−0.17%
2017	1,375	+1.57%
2023	1,452	+0.91%
Source: INSEE

== Heraldry ==
Arms of Brouckerque	The arms of Brouckerque are blazoned : Argent, on a fess sable, 3 cinqfoils Or.

== See also ==
- Communes of the Nord department
