= Uxem =

Uxem Uksem
- Commune
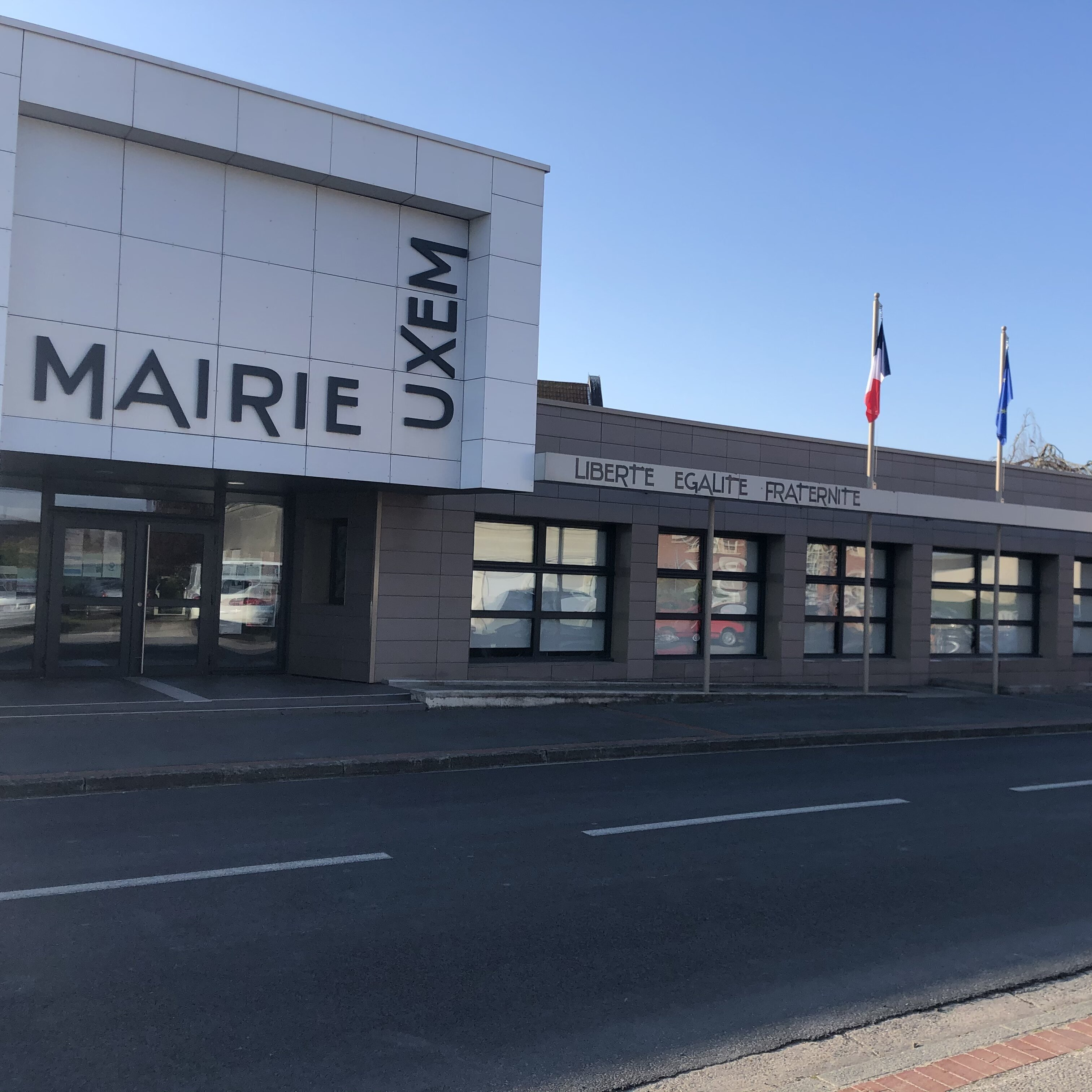
- Saint-Amand Church in Uxem

- Coat of arms
- Location of Uxem
- Location within France Location within Hauts-de-France
- Coordinates: 51°01′20″N 2°29′02″E
- Country: France
- Region: Hauts-de-France
- Department: Nord
- Arrondissement: Dunkerque
- Canton: Coudekerque-Branche
- Intercommunality: CC Hauts de Flandre

Government
  - Mayor (2020–2026): Pierre Defrance
- Area^{1}: 8.27 km^{2} (3.19 sq mi)
- Elevation: 0 m (0 ft)
- Highest elevation: 3 m (9.8 ft)
- Lowest elevation: −2 m (−6.6 ft)
- Population (2023): 1,518
  - Density: 184/km^{2} (475/sq mi)
- Demonym: Uxemois (es)
- Time zone: UTC+01:00 (CET)
  - Summer (DST): UTC+02:00 (CEST)
- INSEE/Postal code: 59605 /59229
- ^{1} French Land Register data, which excludes lakes, ponds, glaciers > 1 km^{2} (0.386 sq mi or 247 acres) and river estuaries.

Uxem (French pronunciation: [yksɛm]; from Flemish; Uksem in modern Dutch spelling) is a commune in the Nord department in northern France.

It is 10 km (6.2 mi) east of Dunkirk.

== Geography ==
Infinitely flat landscape of fields, without trees or shrubs, crisscrossed with watteringues. Cereals, beets and potatoes are grown there. The south of the town is made up of small Moëres, a former lake dried up by Cobergher and which is below sea level, the rest of the town culminating at 1 or 2 meters. To the north, we can see the A16 highway, which cuts the village off from the sea. Further on, you can see the dune factory (metallurgy) behind which the trained eye can see shreds of dunes. To the south, in dry weather, you can make out the chain of Flanders mountains and the abbey of Saint-Winoc de Bergues. Note that over the past 30 years, while the number of inhabitants has increased by 20%, the urbanized area has doubled.

== Climate ==
The climate that characterizes the town is qualified, in 2010, as "altered oceanic climate", according to the typology of the climates of France which then has eight major types of climates in mainland France. In 2020, the town comes out of the same type of climate in the classification established by Météo-France, which now only counts, at first glance, five main types of climates in mainland France. It is a transition zone between the oceanic climate, the mountain climate and the semi-continental climate. The temperature differences between winter and summer increase with the distance from the sea. Rainfall is lower than at the seaside, except near the reliefs.

The climatic parameters that made it possible to establish the 2010 typology include six variables for temperature and eight for precipitation, whose values correspond to the 1971-2000 normal. The seven main variables characterizing the municipality are presented in the box below.

With climate change, these variables have evolved. A study carried out in 2014 by the General Directorate for Energy and Climate, supplemented by regional studies, predicts that the average temperature should increase and the average rainfall decrease, with, however, strong regional variations. These changes can be seen at the nearest Météo-France meteorological station, "Dunkerque", in the commune of Dunkirk, commissioned in 1917 and which is 8 km away as the crow flies, where the average temperature is 11.3 °C and the precipitation amount is 697.8 mm for the period 1981-2010. On the nearest historical meteorological station, "Lille-Lesquin", in the commune of Lesquin, commissioned in 1944 and 65 km away, the annual average temperature changes from 10.4 °C for the period 1971-2000 to 10 .8 °C for 1981-2010, then 11.3 °C for 1991-2020.

== Heraldry ==
Arms of Uxem	The arms of Uxem are blazoned : Gules, 3 leopards Or impaled with Checky argent and azure, a canton ermine.

== See also ==
- Communes of the Nord department
