= Herzeele =

Herzeele Herzele
- Commune
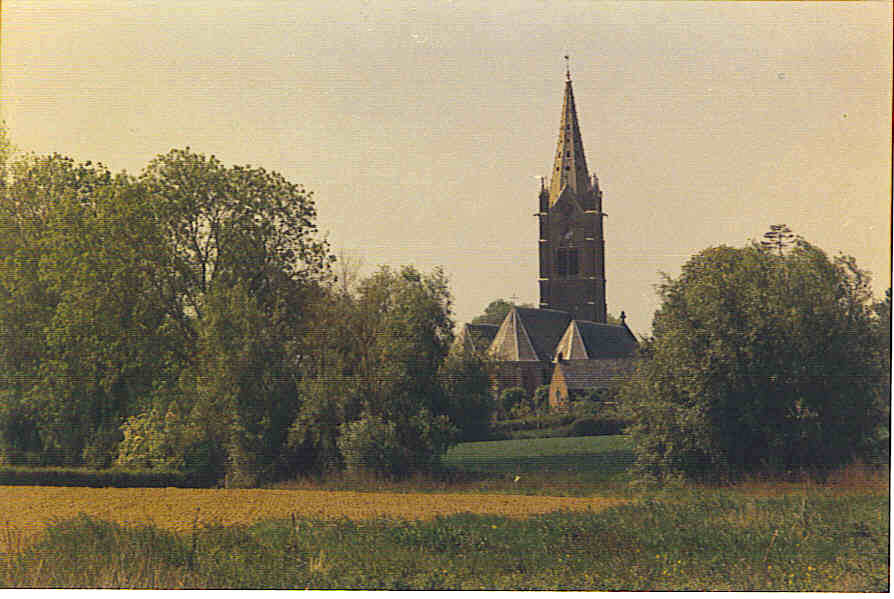
- The church in Herzeele

- Coat of arms
- Location of Herzeele
- Location within France Location within Hauts-de-France
- Coordinates: 50°53′14″N 2°32′03″E
- Country: France
- Region: Hauts-de-France
- Department: Nord
- Arrondissement: Dunkerque
- Canton: Wormhout
- Intercommunality: CC Hauts de Flandre

Government
  - Mayor (2020–2026): Stéphane Francke
- Area^{1}: 17.17 km^{2} (6.63 sq mi)
- Elevation: 12 m (39 ft)
- Highest elevation: 26 m (85 ft)
- Lowest elevation: 4 m (13 ft)
- Population (2023): 1,638
  - Density: 95.40/km^{2} (247.1/sq mi)
- Demonym: Herzeelois
- Time zone: UTC+01:00 (CET)
  - Summer (DST): UTC+02:00 (CEST)
- INSEE/Postal code: 59305 /59470
- ^{1} French Land Register data, which excludes lakes, ponds, glaciers > 1 km^{2} (0.386 sq mi or 247 acres) and river estuaries.

Herzeele (French pronunciation: [ɛʁzɛl]; from Dutch; Herzele in modern Dutch spelling) is a commune in the Nord department in northern France.

== Heraldry ==
Arms of Herzeele	The arms of Herzeele are blazoned : Per fess Or and gules, an eagle sable and a lion argent.

== See also ==
- Communes of the Nord department
