= Canton of Wormhout =

Coordinates: 50°51′20″N 2°22′20″E

Wormhout
- Canton
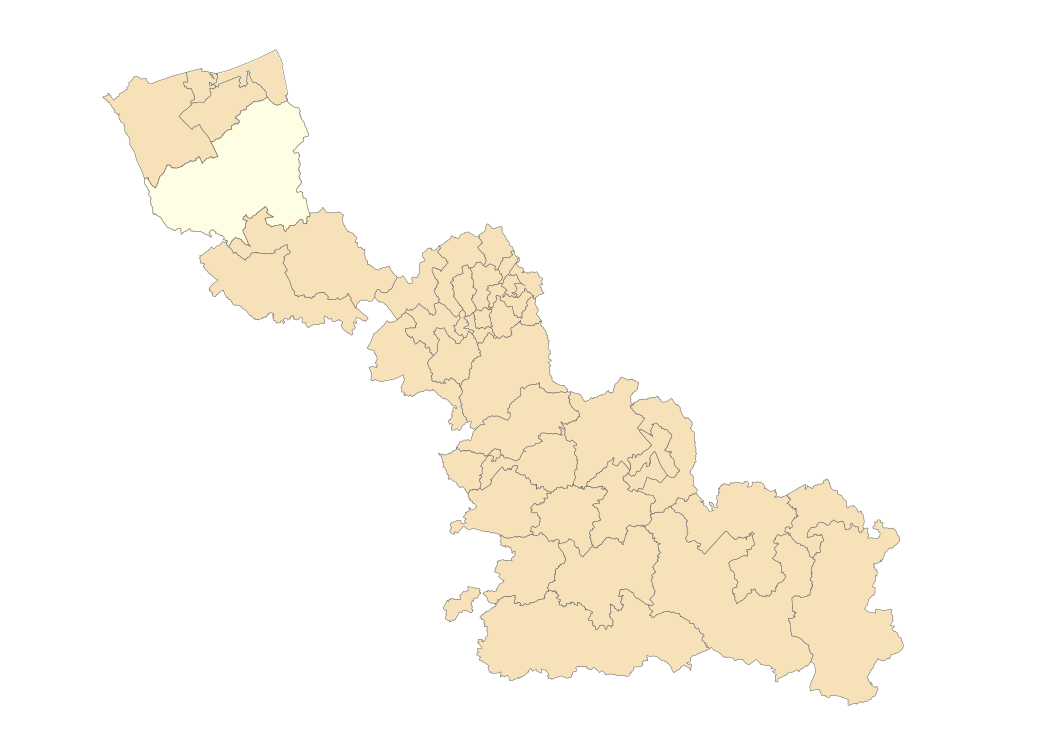
- Map of the canton of Wormhout within the Nord department
- Country: France
- Region: Hauts-de-France
- Department: Nord
- No. of communes: {{{nbcomm}}}
- Area: 501.95 km^{2} (193.80 sq mi)
- Population (2023): 53,642
  - Density: 106.87/km^{2} (276.78/sq mi)
- INSEE code: 5941

Canton of Wormhout is an administrative division, located in Nord département and Hauts-de-France région in France. All communes of the canton of Wormhout are part of the arrondissement of Dunkirk.

Since the French canton reorganisation which came into effect in March 2015, the communes of the canton of Wormhout are:

- Arnèke
- Bambecque
- Bavinchove
- Bissezeele
- Bollezeele
- Broxeele
- Buysscheure
- Crochte
- Eringhem
- Esquelbecq
- Hardifort
- Herzeele
- Holque
- Hondschoote
- Houtkerque
- Hoymille
- Killem
- Lederzeele
- Ledringhem
- Merckeghem
- Millam
- Nieurlet
- Noordpeene
- Ochtezeele
- Oost-Cappel
- Oudezeele
- Quaëdypre
- Rexpoëde
- Rubrouck
- Saint-Momelin
- Socx
- Steenvoorde
- Terdeghem
- Volckerinckhove
- Warhem
- Watten
- Wemaers-Cappel
- West-Cappel
- Winnezeele
- Wormhout
- Wulverdinghe
- Wylder
- Zegerscappel
- Zermezeele
- Zuytpeene
