= West-Cappel =

West-Cappel Westkappel
- Commune
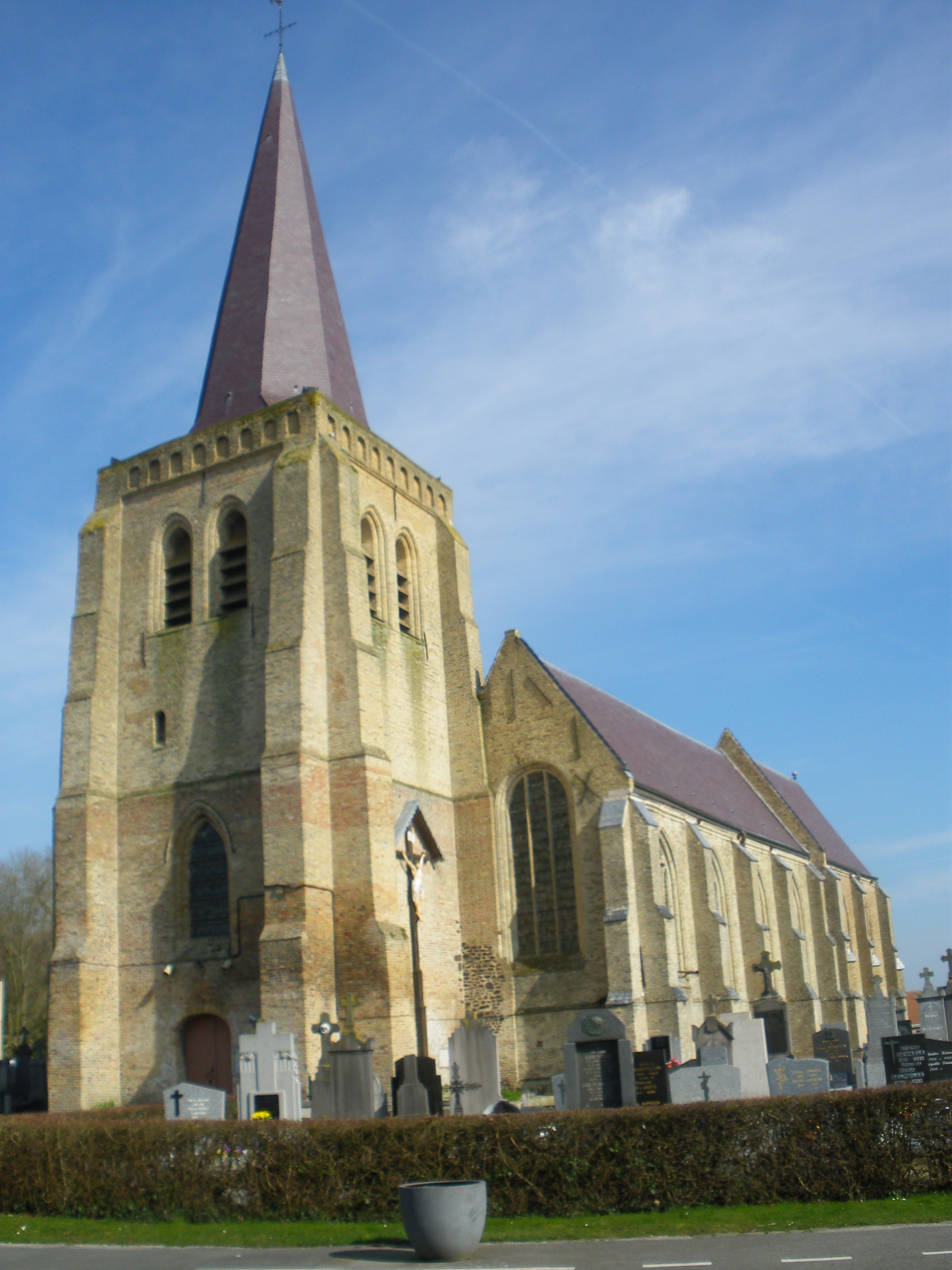
- The church in West-Cappel

- Coat of arms
- Location of West-Cappel
- Location within France Location within Hauts-de-France
- Coordinates: 50°55′47″N 2°30′22″E
- Country: France
- Region: Hauts-de-France
- Department: Nord
- Arrondissement: Dunkerque
- Canton: Wormhout
- Intercommunality: Hauts de Flandre

Government
  - Mayor (2020–2026): André Figoureux
- Area^{1}: 7.57 km^{2} (2.92 sq mi)
- Elevation: 22 m (72 ft)
- Highest elevation: 27 m (89 ft)
- Lowest elevation: 6 m (20 ft)
- Population (2023): 644
  - Density: 85.1/km^{2} (220/sq mi)
- Demonym: West-Cappelois (es)
- Time zone: UTC+01:00 (CET)
  - Summer (DST): UTC+02:00 (CEST)
- INSEE/Postal code: 59657 /59380
- ^{1} French Land Register data, which excludes lakes, ponds, glaciers > 1 km^{2} (0.386 sq mi or 247 acres) and river estuaries.

West-Cappel (French pronunciation: [wɛst kapɛl]; Dutch: Westkappel) is a commune in the Nord department in northern France.

== Heraldry ==
Arms of West-Cappel	The arms of West-Cappel are blazoned : Argent, a bend fusil gules. (probably not heraldically significantly different from Noordpeene)

== Population ==
Historical population
Year	Pop.	±% p.a.
1968	453	—
1975	453	+0.00%
1982	433	−0.64%
1990	497	+1.74%
1999	526	+0.63%
2007	572	+1.05%
2012	570	−0.07%
2017	628	+1.96%
2023	644	+0.42%
Source: INSEE

== See also ==
- Communes of the Nord department
