= Communauté de communes des Hauts de Flandre =

Federation of municipalities in France

Hauts de Flandre
- Communauté de communes
- Interactive map of Hauts de Flandre
- Coordinates: 50°58′N 2°26′E
- Country: France
- Region: Hauts-de-France
- Department: Nord
- No. of communes: 40
- Established: 2014
- Area: 448.5 km^{2} (173.2 sq mi)
- Population (2018): 53,584
  - Density: 119.5/km^{2} (309.4/sq mi)

The Communauté de communes des Hauts de Flandre is a communauté de communes in the Nord département and in the Hauts-de-France région of France. It was formed on 1 January 2014 by the merger of the former Communauté de communes de la Colme, Communauté de communes du canton de Bergues, Communauté de communes de Flandre and the Communauté de communes de l'Yser. Its seat is in Bergues. Its area is 448.5 km^{2}, and its population was 53,584 in 2018.

== Communes ==
The Communauté de communes des Hauts de Flandre consists of the following 40 communes:

1. Bambecque
2. Bergues
3. Bierne
4. Bissezeele
5. Bollezeele
6. Brouckerque
7. Broxeele
8. Cappelle-Brouck
9. Crochte
10. Drincham
11. Eringhem
12. Esquelbecq
13. Herzeele
14. Holque
15. Hondschoote
16. Hoymille
17. Killem
18. Lederzeele
19. Ledringhem
20. Looberghe
21. Merckeghem
22. Millam
23. Nieurlet
24. Oost-Cappel
25. Pitgam
26. Quaëdypre
27. Rexpoëde
28. Saint-Momelin
29. Saint-Pierre-Brouck
30. Socx
31. Steene
32. Uxem
33. Volckerinckhove
34. Warhem
35. Watten
36. West-Cappel
37. Wormhout
38. Wulverdinghe
39. Wylder
40. Zegerscappel
