= Lederzeele =

Lederzeele Lederzele
- Commune
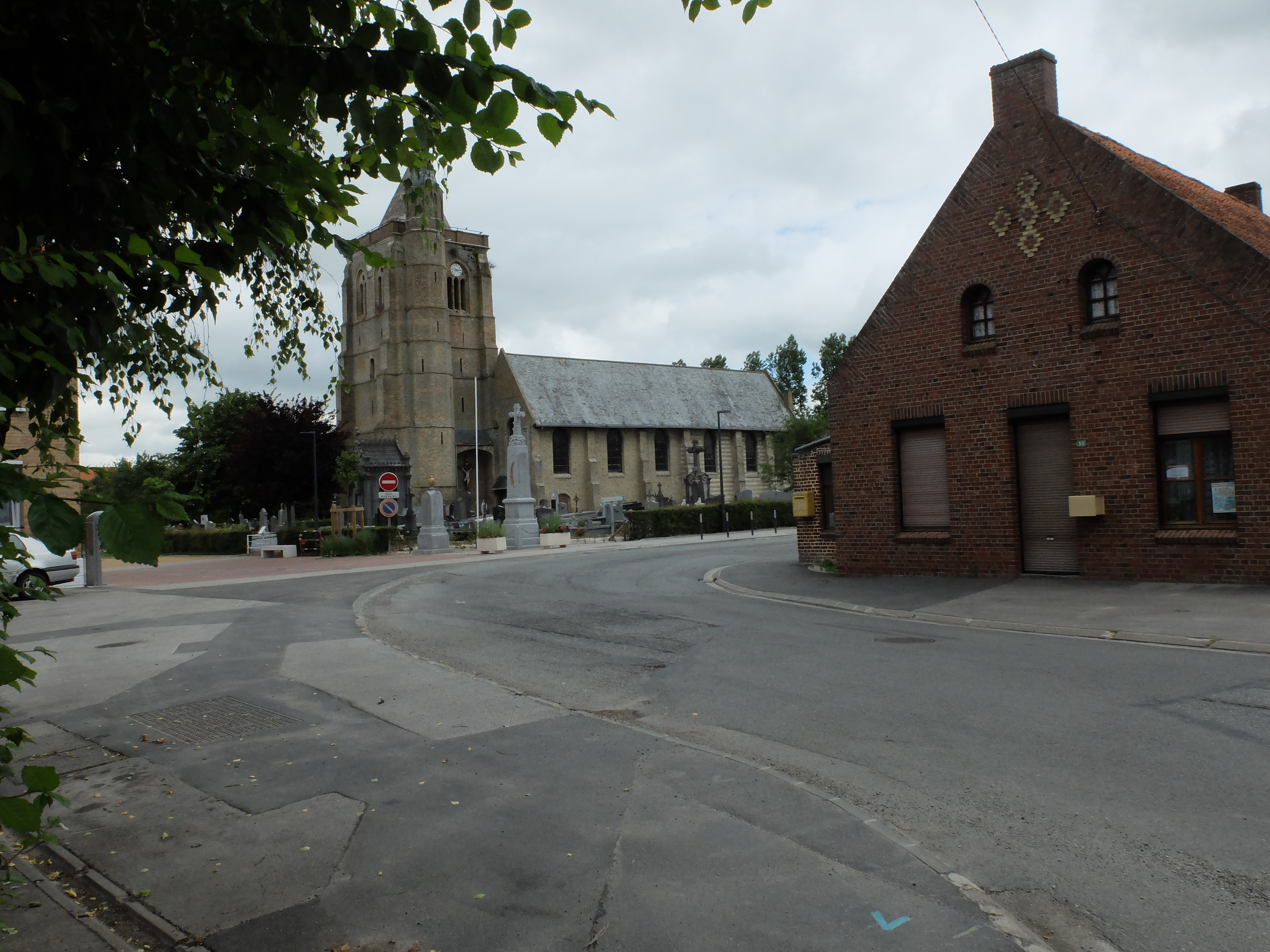
- The church in Lederzeele

- Coat of arms
- Location of Lederzeele
- Location within France Location within Hauts-de-France
- Coordinates: 50°49′21″N 2°18′01″E
- Country: France
- Region: Hauts-de-France
- Department: Nord
- Arrondissement: Dunkirk
- Canton: Wormhout
- Intercommunality: Hauts de Flandre

Government
  - Mayor (2020–2026): Michel Delforge
- Area^{1}: 8.64 km^{2} (3.34 sq mi)
- Elevation: 33 m (108 ft)
- Highest elevation: 41 m (135 ft)
- Lowest elevation: 4 m (13 ft)
- Population (2023): 703
  - Density: 81.4/km^{2} (211/sq mi)
- Demonym: Lederzeelois
- Time zone: UTC+01:00 (CET)
  - Summer (DST): UTC+02:00 (CEST)
- INSEE/Postal code: 59337 /59143
- ^{1} French Land Register data, which excludes lakes, ponds, glaciers > 1 km^{2} (0.386 sq mi or 247 acres) and river estuaries.

Lederzeele (from Flemish; Lederzele in modern Dutch spelling) is a commune in the Nord department in northern France.

It is 10 km (6.2 mi) northeast of Saint-Omer.

== Heraldry ==
Arms of Lederzeele	The arms of Lederzeele are blazoned : Azure billetty, on a bend Or 3 martlets gules.

== See also ==
- Communes of the Nord department
