= Pitgam =

- Commune
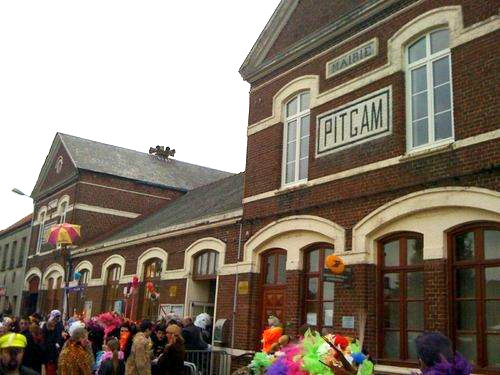
- The town hall in Pitgam

- Coat of arms
- Location of Pitgam
- Location within France Location within Hauts-de-France
- Coordinates: 50°55′43″N 2°19′53″E
- Country: France
- Region: Hauts-de-France
- Department: Nord
- Arrondissement: Dunkerque
- Canton: Grande-Synthe
- Intercommunality: Hauts de Flandre

Government
  - Mayor (2020–2026): Brigitte Decriem
- Area^{1}: 23.37 km^{2} (9.02 sq mi)
- Elevation: 30 m (98 ft)
- Highest elevation: 43 m (141 ft)
- Lowest elevation: 1 m (3.3 ft)
- Population (2023): 1,007
  - Density: 43.09/km^{2} (111.6/sq mi)
- Demonym: Pitgamois (es)
- Time zone: UTC+01:00 (CET)
  - Summer (DST): UTC+02:00 (CEST)
- INSEE/Postal code: 59463 /59284
- ^{1} French Land Register data, which excludes lakes, ponds, glaciers > 1 km^{2} (0.386 sq mi or 247 acres) and river estuaries.

Pitgam (French pronunciation: [piɡam]) is a commune in the Nord department in northern France.

== Heraldry ==
Arms of Pitgam	The arms of Pitgam are blazoned : Azure, a fess argent. (Pitgam, Châteauponsac, Fénétrange use the same arms.)

== See also ==
- Communes of the Nord department
