= Oost-Cappel =

- Commune
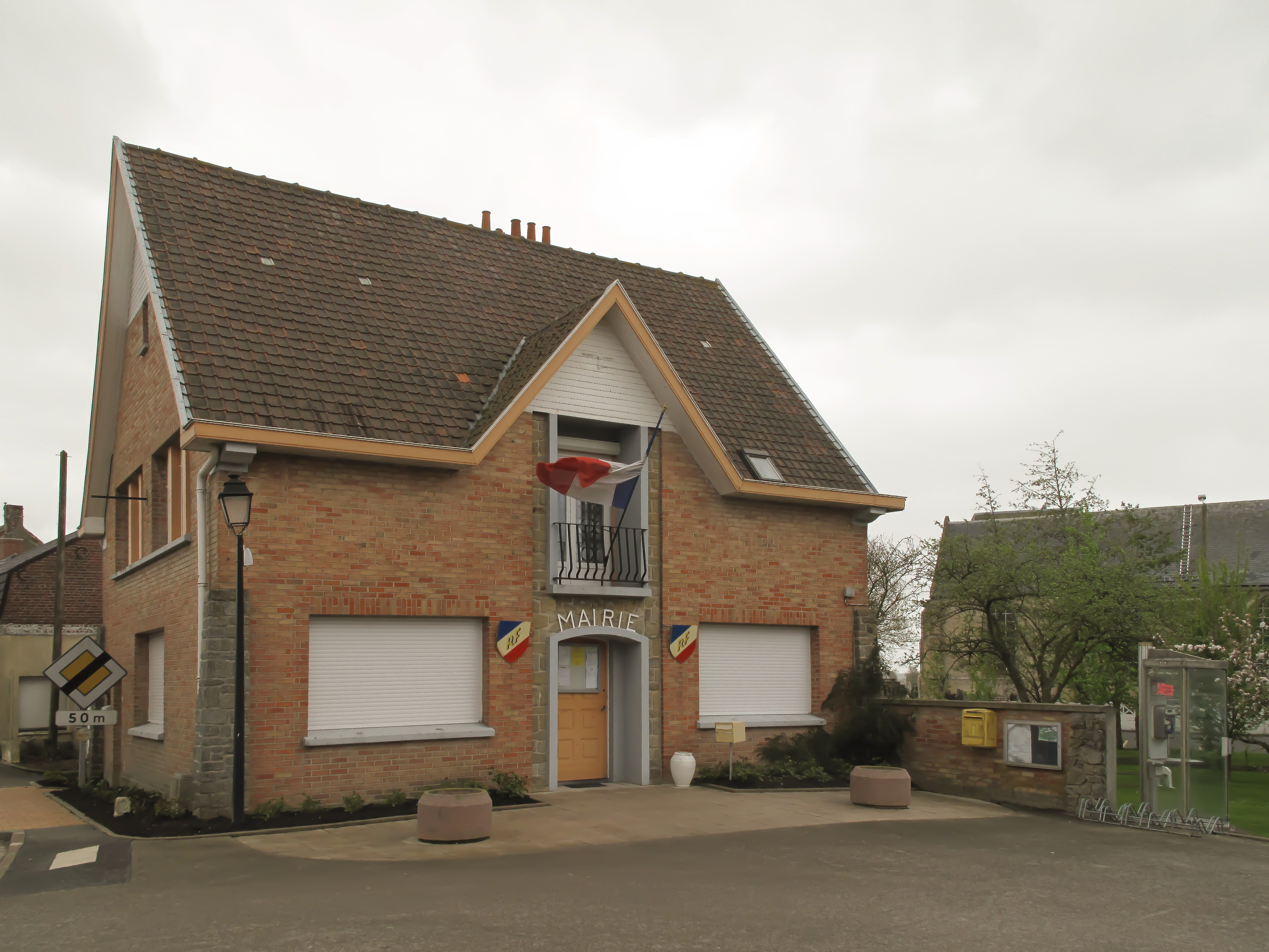
- Oost Cappel, townhall

- Coat of arms
- Location of Oost-Cappel
- Location within France Location within Hauts-de-France
- Coordinates: 50°55′31″N 2°35′54″E
- Country: France
- Region: Hauts-de-France
- Department: Nord
- Arrondissement: Dunkerque
- Canton: Wormhout
- Intercommunality: CC Hauts de Flandre

Government
  - Mayor (2020–2026): Stéphanie Porreye
- Area^{1}: 3.99 km^{2} (1.54 sq mi)
- Elevation: 18 m (59 ft)
- Highest elevation: 17 m (56 ft)
- Lowest elevation: 8 m (26 ft)
- Population (2023): 463
  - Density: 116/km^{2} (301/sq mi)
- Demonym: Oostcapellois (es)
- Time zone: UTC+01:00 (CET)
  - Summer (DST): UTC+02:00 (CEST)
- INSEE/Postal code: 59448 /59122
- ^{1} French Land Register data, which excludes lakes, ponds, glaciers > 1 km^{2} (0.386 sq mi or 247 acres) and river estuaries.

Oost-Cappel is a commune in the Nord department in northern France on the Belgian border.

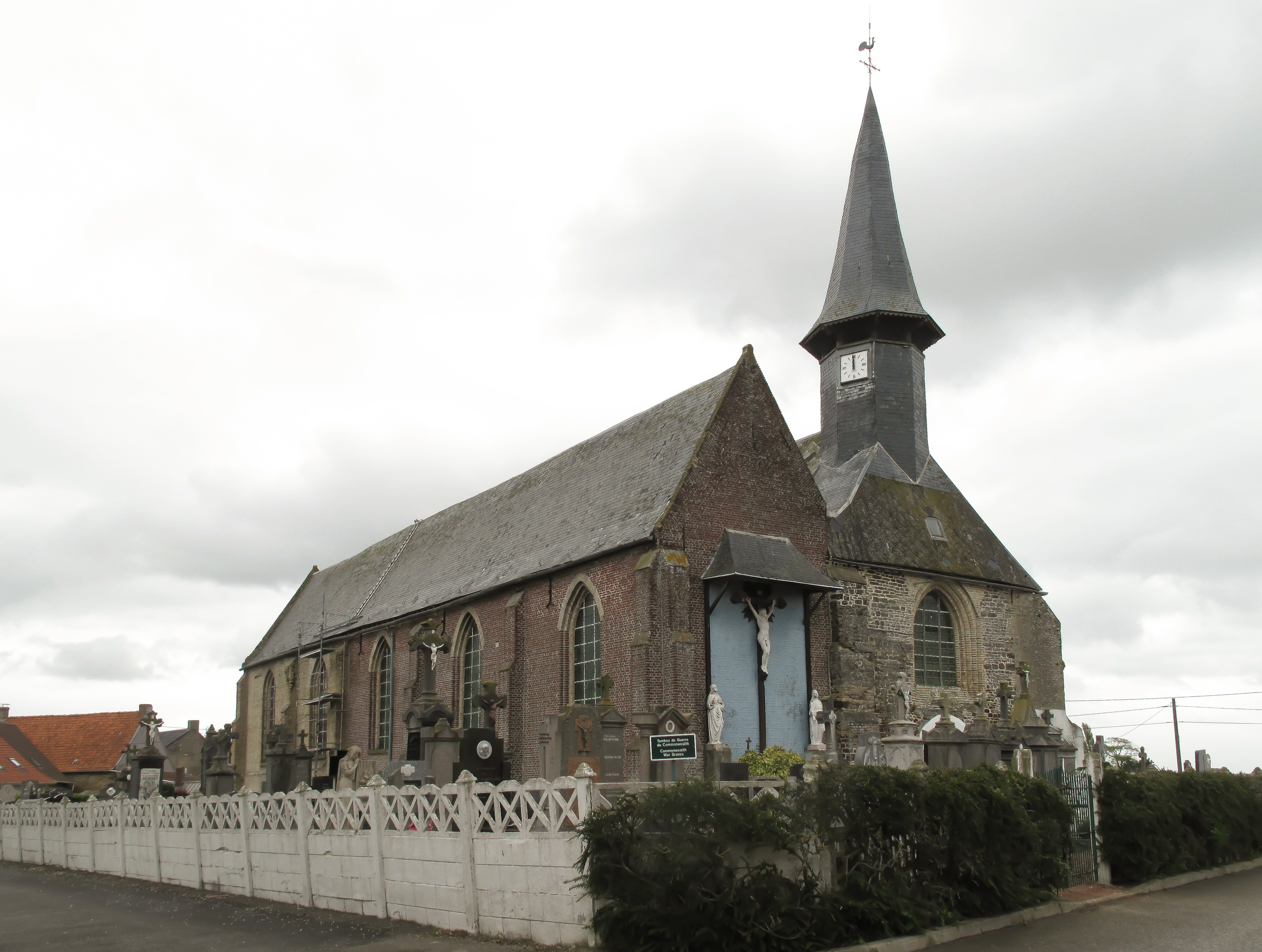
Oost-Cappel, church: l'église Saint Nicolas

== Heraldry ==
Arms of Oost-Cappel	The arms of Oost-Cappel are blazoned : Quarterly 1&4: Quarterly Or and sable; 2&3: Bendy argent and azure, a bordure gules; overall an inescutcheon gules, 3 bends vair and a chief Or.

== See also ==
- Communes of the Nord department
