= Canton of Merville =

Coordinates: 50°39′07″N 2°40′09″E

Merville
- Former canton
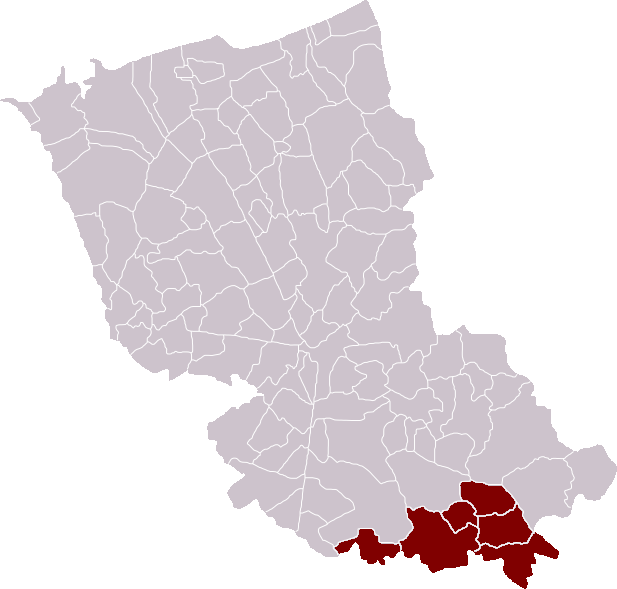
- Map of the canton of Mereville within the Arrondissement of Dunkirk
- Country: France
- Region: Hauts-de-France
- Department: Nord
- No. of communes: {{{nbcomm}}}
- Disbanded: 2015
- Population (2012): 25,467

The Canton of Merville is a former cantons in the Dunkirk arrondissement of the Nord department of the Nord-Pas-de-Calais region, in northern France. It had 25,467 inhabitants (2012). It was disbanded following the French canton reorganisation which came into effect in March 2015.

== Municipalities ==
It comprised 6 communes:

- Estaires
- Haverskerque
- La Gorgue
- Le Doulieu
- Merville (chief town)
- Neuf-Berquin

== Politics ==
Its conseiller général from 2001- 2008 was Josette Fruchart (UPN / UMP, also mayor of Estaires), and from 2008 to 2014 it was Jacques Parent (PS).
