= Warhem =

Warhem Warrem
- Commune
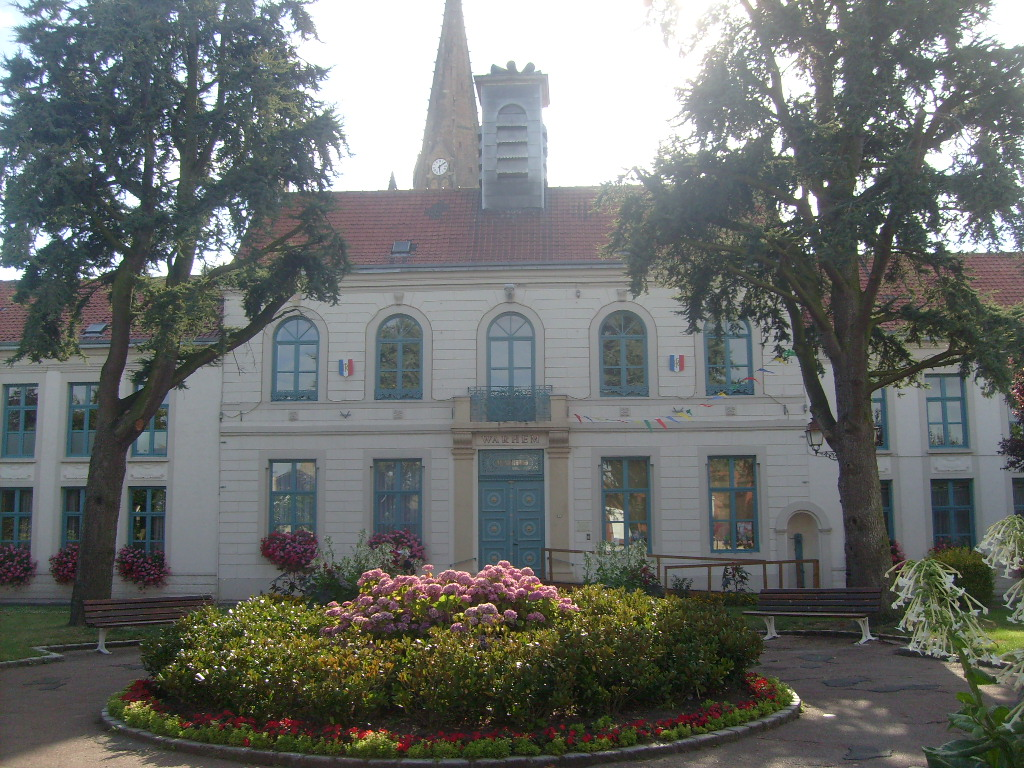
- The town hall in Warhem

- Coat of arms
- Location of Warhem
- Location within France Location within Hauts-de-France
- Coordinates: 50°58′35″N 2°29′38″E
- Country: France
- Region: Hauts-de-France
- Department: Nord
- Arrondissement: Dunkerque
- Canton: Wormhout
- Intercommunality: Hauts de Flandre

Government
  - Mayor (2020–2026): Pierre Bouttemy
- Area^{1}: 27.84 km^{2} (10.75 sq mi)
- Elevation: 15 m (49 ft)
- Highest elevation: 26 m (85 ft)
- Lowest elevation: 0 m (0 ft)
- Population (2023): 2,020
  - Density: 72.6/km^{2} (188/sq mi)
- Demonym: Warhemois (es)
- Time zone: UTC+01:00 (CET)
  - Summer (DST): UTC+02:00 (CEST)
- INSEE/Postal code: 59641 /59380
- ^{1} French Land Register data, which excludes lakes, ponds, glaciers > 1 km^{2} (0.386 sq mi or 247 acres) and river estuaries.

Warhem (French pronunciation: [waʁɛm]; from Flemish; Warrem in modern Dutch spelling) is a commune in the Nord department in northern France, near the border with Belgium.

== Heraldry ==
Arms of Warhem	The arms of Warhem are blazoned : Chequy argent and sable.

== Population ==
Historical population
Year	Pop.	±% p.a.
1968	1,321	—
1975	1,363	+0.45%
1982	1,667	+2.92%
1990	1,916	+1.76%
1999	1,831	−0.50%
2007	2,029	+1.29%
2012	2,071	+0.41%
2017	2,032	−0.38%
2023	2,020	−0.10%
Source: INSEE

== See also ==
- Communes of the Nord department
