= Hoymille =

Hoymille Hooimille
- Commune
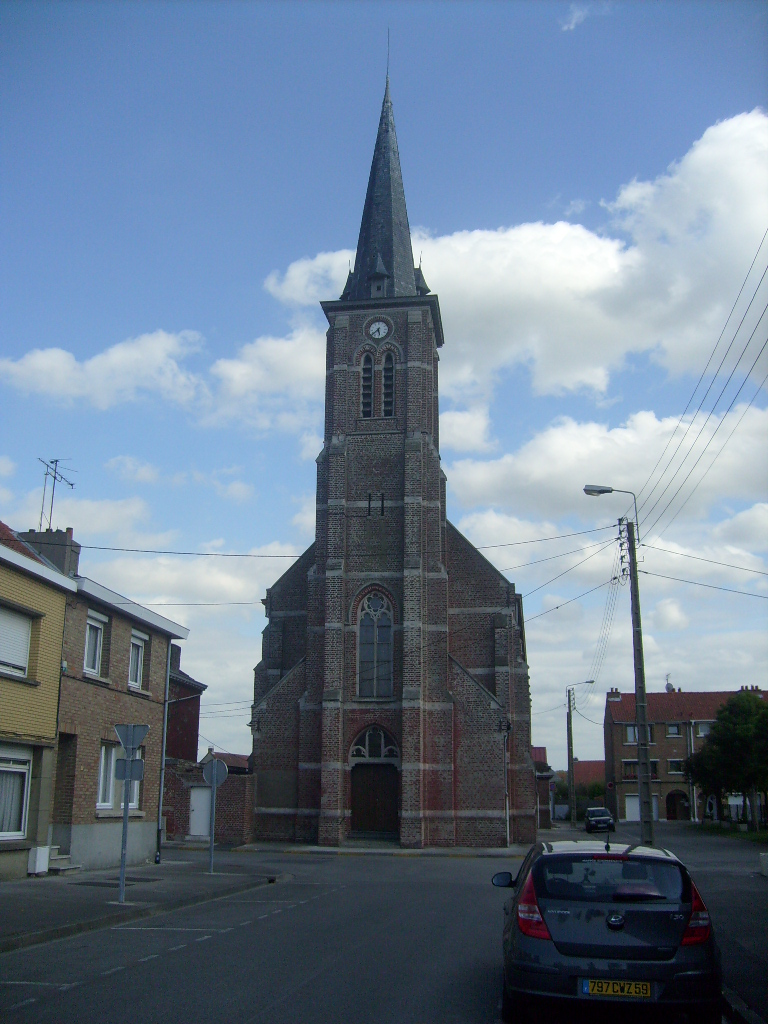
- The church in Hoymille

- Coat of arms
- Location of Hoymille
- Location within France Location within Hauts-de-France
- Coordinates: 50°58′40″N 2°27′05″E
- Country: France
- Region: Hauts-de-France
- Department: Nord
- Arrondissement: Dunkerque
- Canton: Wormhout
- Intercommunality: Hauts de Flandre

Government
  - Mayor (2020–2026): Daniel Thamiry
- Area^{1}: 5.53 km^{2} (2.14 sq mi)
- Elevation: 2 m (6.6 ft)
- Highest elevation: 12 m (39 ft)
- Lowest elevation: 1.25 m (4.1 ft)
- Population (2023): 3,259
  - Density: 589/km^{2} (1,530/sq mi)
- Demonym: Hoymillois
- Time zone: UTC+01:00 (CET)
  - Summer (DST): UTC+02:00 (CEST)
- INSEE/Postal code: 59319 /59492
- ^{1} French Land Register data, which excludes lakes, ponds, glaciers > 1 km^{2} (0.386 sq mi or 247 acres) and river estuaries.

Hoymille (French pronunciation: [wamil]; from Flemish; Hooimille in modern Dutch spelling) is a commune in the Nord department in northern France. It is situated adjacent to the east of Bergues. The village hosts an annual carnival at the end February. The local church is St Gérard's.

== Population ==
Historical population
Year	Pop.	±% p.a.
1968	545	—
1975	2,042	+20.77%
1982	3,142	+6.35%
1990	3,256	+0.45%
1999	3,097	−0.55%
2007	3,041	−0.23%
2012	3,222	+1.16%
2017	3,214	−0.05%
2023	3,259	+0.23%
Source: INSEE

== Heraldry ==
Arms of Hoymille	The arms of Hoymille are blazoned : Or, a chief chequy azure and argent.

== See also ==
- Communes of the Nord department
