= Merckeghem =

- Commune
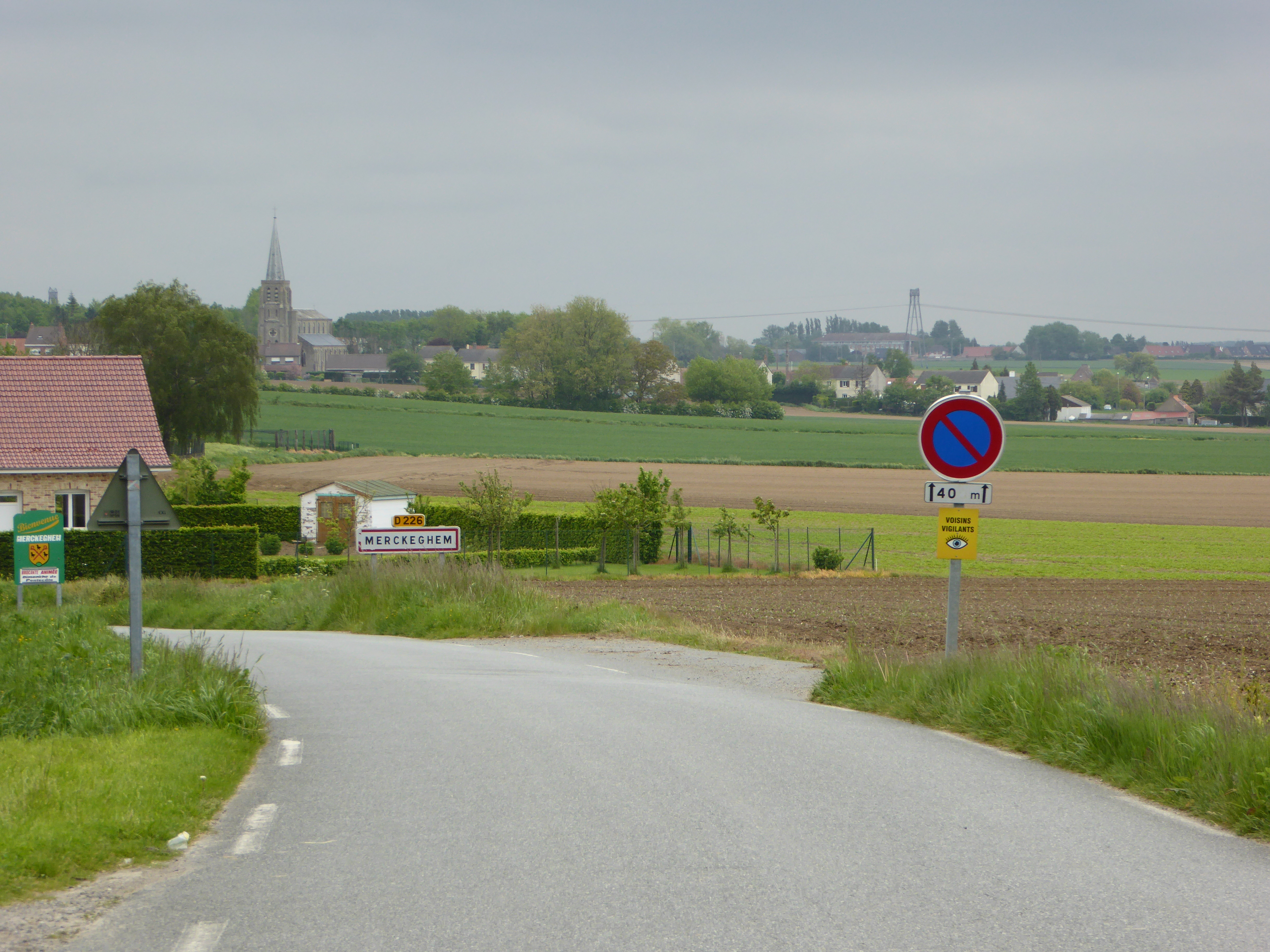
- The road into Merckeghem

- Coat of arms
- Location of Merckeghem
- Location within France Location within Hauts-de-France
- Coordinates: 50°51′44″N 2°17′48″E
- Country: France
- Region: Hauts-de-France
- Department: Nord
- Arrondissement: Dunkerque
- Canton: Wormhout
- Intercommunality: Hauts de Flandre

Government
  - Mayor (2020–2026): Danielle Vanmaele
- Area^{1}: 10.73 km^{2} (4.14 sq mi)
- Elevation: 62 m (203 ft)
- Highest elevation: 63 m (207 ft)
- Lowest elevation: 0 m (0 ft)
- Population (2023): 615
  - Density: 57.3/km^{2} (148/sq mi)
- Demonym: Merckeghemois
- Time zone: UTC+01:00 (CET)
  - Summer (DST): UTC+02:00 (CEST)
- INSEE/Postal code: 59397 /59470
- ^{1} French Land Register data, which excludes lakes, ponds, glaciers > 1 km^{2} (0.386 sq mi or 247 acres) and river estuaries.

Merckeghem (French pronunciation: [mɛʁkəɡɛm]; Dutch: Merckegem) is a commune in the Nord department in northern France.

== Heraldry ==
Arms of Merckeghem	The arms of Merckeghem are blazoned : Or, 2 croziers in saltire respectant gules, between 3 corbies sable and a mount vert.

== See also ==
- Communes of the Nord department
