= Canton of Grande-Synthe =

Coordinates: 51.01°N 2.30°E

The canton of Grande-Synthe is an administrative division of the Nord department, northern France. Its borders were modified at the French canton reorganisation which came into effect in March 2015. Its seat is in Grande-Synthe.

It consists of the following communes:

1. Bourbourg
2. Brouckerque
3. Cappelle-Brouck
4. Craywick
5. Drincham
6. Dunkirk (partly)
7. Grande-Synthe
8. Grand-Fort-Philippe
9. Gravelines
10. Looberghe
11. Loon-Plage
12. Pitgam
13. Saint-Georges-sur-l'Aa
14. Saint-Pierre-Brouck
