= Millam =

- Commune
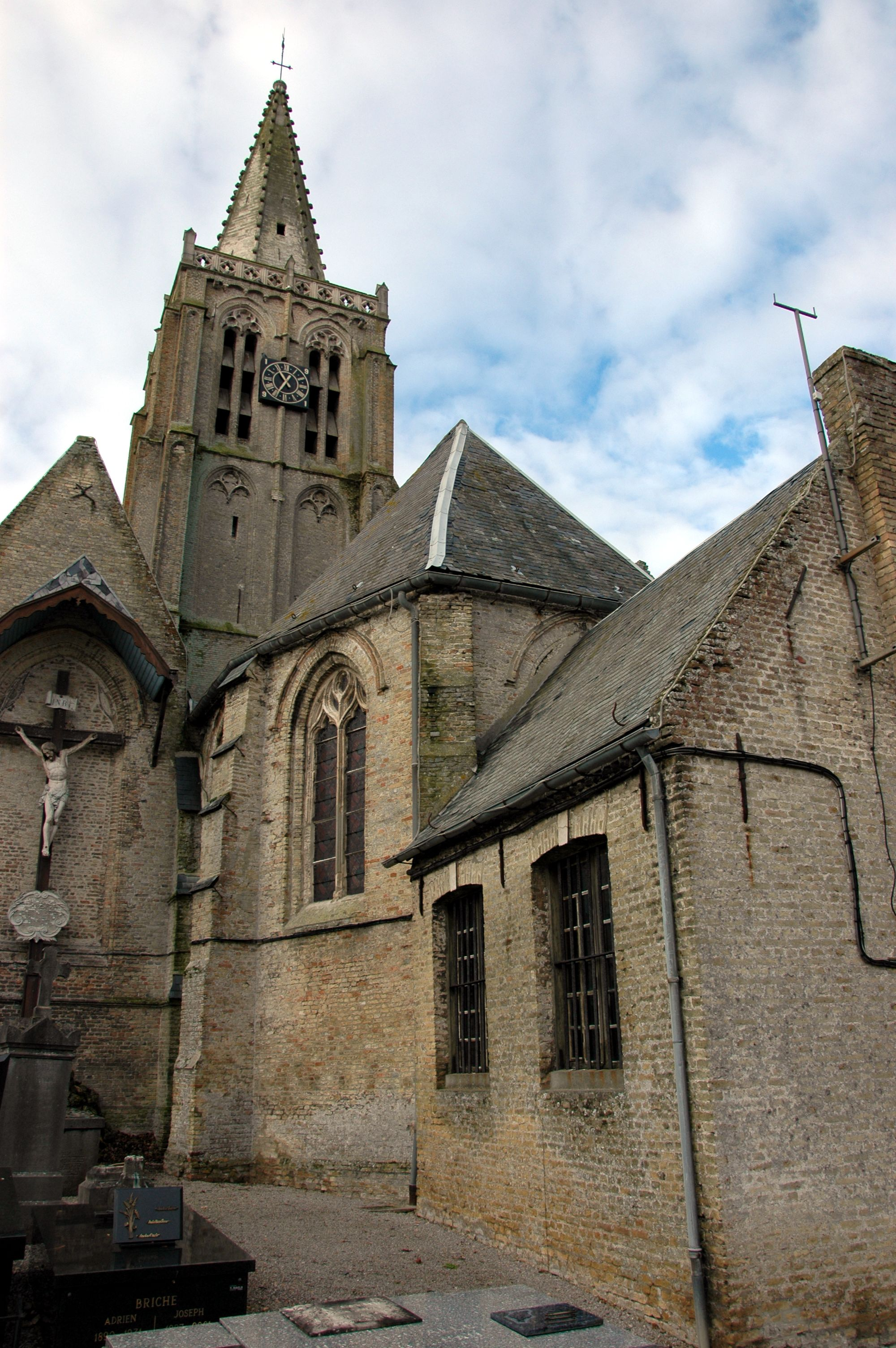
- Millam in the arrondissement of Dunkirk

- Coat of arms
- Location of Millam
- Location within France Location within Hauts-de-France
- Coordinates: 50°51′N 2°15′E
- Country: France
- Region: Hauts-de-France
- Department: Nord
- Arrondissement: Dunkirk
- Canton: Wormhout
- Intercommunality: Hauts de Flandre

Government
  - Mayor (2020–2026): Marie-Andrée Beckaert
- Area^{1}: 12.44 km^{2} (4.80 sq mi)
- Elevation: 25 m (82 ft)
- Highest elevation: 54 m (177 ft)
- Lowest elevation: −0.5 m (−1.6 ft)
- Population (2023): 838
  - Density: 67.4/km^{2} (174/sq mi)
- Time zone: UTC+01:00 (CET)
  - Summer (DST): UTC+02:00 (CEST)
- INSEE/Postal code: 59402 /59143
- ^{1} French Land Register data, which excludes lakes, ponds, glaciers > 1 km^{2} (0.386 sq mi or 247 acres) and river estuaries.

Millam (French pronunciation: [milam]) is a commune in the Nord department in northern France.

A chapel dedicated to the Mercian Saint Mildrith (Mildred), Abbess of Minster-in-Thanet, who is said to have stayed there, exists in Millam, but is privately owned and not easily visited.

== Heraldry ==
| Arms of Millam | The arms of Millam are blazoned : Gules, on a chief argent 3 martlets of the first. |

== See also ==
- Communes of the Nord department
