= Wulverdinghe =

- Commune
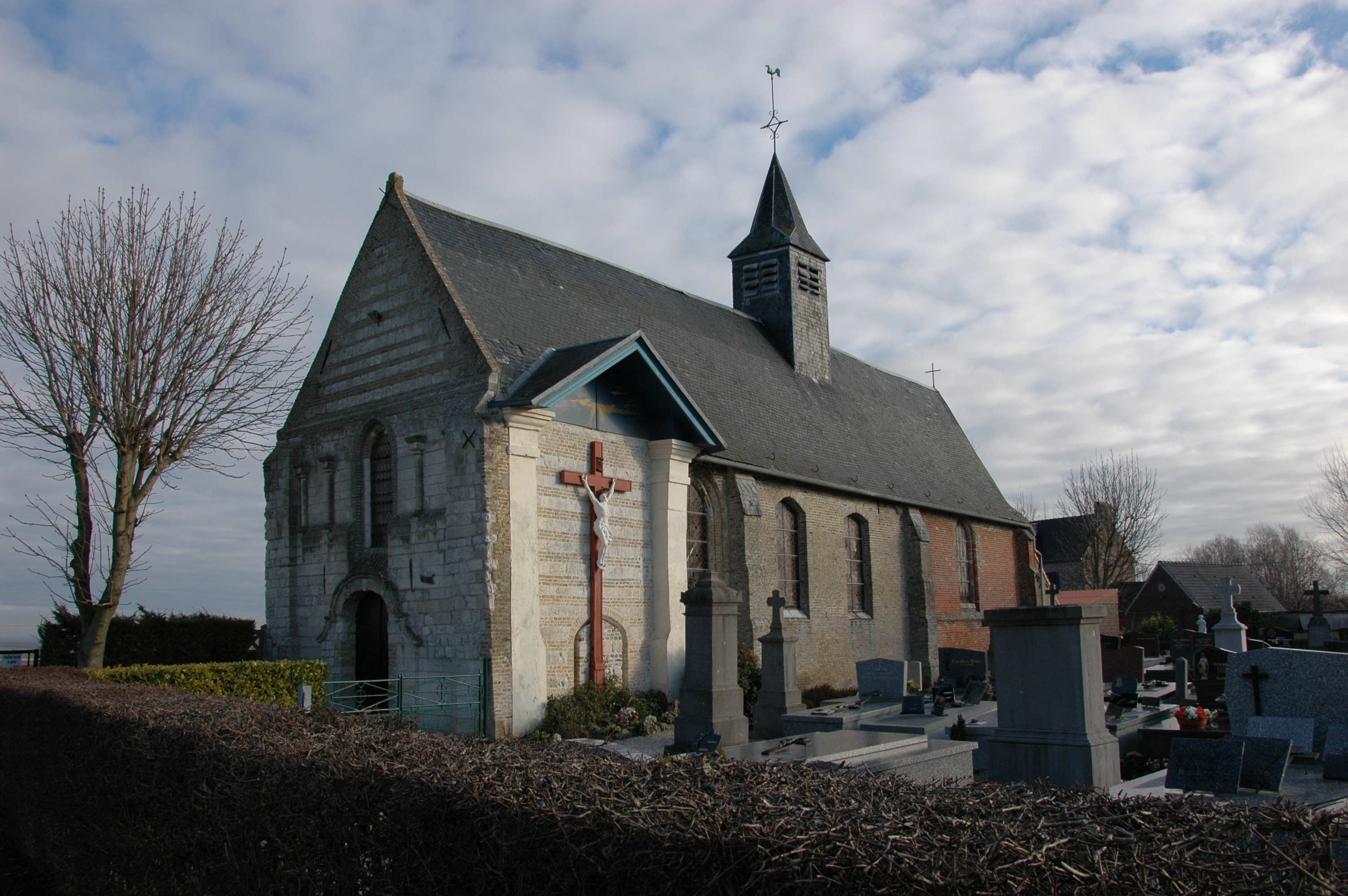
- The church in Wulverdinghe

- Coat of arms
- Location of Wulverdinghe
- Location within France Location within Hauts-de-France
- Coordinates: 50°49′56″N 2°15′23″E
- Country: France
- Region: Hauts-de-France
- Department: Nord
- Arrondissement: Dunkerque
- Canton: Wormhout
- Intercommunality: Hauts de Flandre

Government
  - Mayor (2022–2026): Philippe Perrin
- Area^{1}: 2.92 km^{2} (1.13 sq mi)
- Elevation: 6 m (20 ft)
- Highest elevation: 72 m (236 ft)
- Lowest elevation: 14 m (46 ft)
- Population (2023): 334
  - Density: 114/km^{2} (296/sq mi)
- Demonym: Wulverdinghois
- Time zone: UTC+01:00 (CET)
  - Summer (DST): UTC+02:00 (CEST)
- INSEE/Postal code: 59664 /59143
- ^{1} French Land Register data, which excludes lakes, ponds, glaciers > 1 km^{2} (0.386 sq mi or 247 acres) and river estuaries.

Wulverdinghe is a commune in the Nord department in northern France.

== Population ==
Historical population
Year	Pop.	±% p.a.
1968	232	—
1975	198	−2.24%
1982	206	+0.57%
1990	227	+1.22%
1999	230	+0.15%
2007	259	+1.50%
2012	313	+3.86%
2017	309	−0.26%
2023	334	+1.31%
Source: INSEE

== Heraldry ==
Arms of Wulverdinghe	The arms of Wulverdinghe are blazoned : Barry Or and azure, in chief in fess 3 annulets gules. (Wulverdinghe and Westrehem use the same arms.)

== See also ==
- Communes of the Nord department
