= Houtland (France) =

Coordinates: 50.80°N 2.49°E

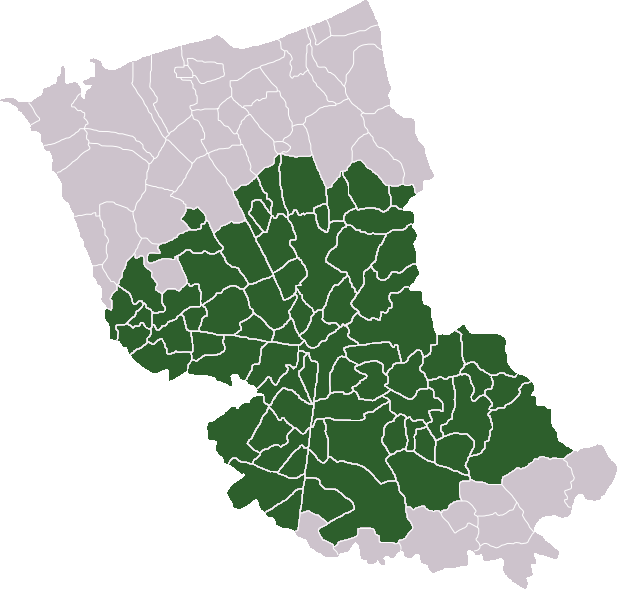
Communes situated entirely or with the main village in Houtland in the arrondissement of Dunkirk

The Houtland (Flemish: [ˈɦʌutlɑnt], French: [utlɑ̃d]; Flemish for "Woodland") is a region in French Flanders which is a part of the French Westhoek, in the Nord department of France. In the region, like the rest of French Flanders, French Flemish is historically spoken but in decline.

In contrast to the name, a lot of the region is used for agricultural purposes.

The highest hill is Kasselberg (French: Mont Cassel), on which Cassel is located, with a height of 176 meter.

== Communes of Houtland ==
Arnèke, Bailleul, Bavinchove, Boeschepe, Buysscheure, Cassel, Eecke, Godewaersvelde, Hardifort, Hazebrouck, Houtkerque, Ledringhem, Noordpeene, Ochtezeele, Oudezeele, Oxelaëre, Renescure, Rubrouck, Saint-Sylvestre-Cappel, Sainte-Marie-Cappel, Steenbecque, Steenvoorde, Terdeghem, Volckerinckhove, Watten, Wemaers-Cappel, Winnezeele, Wormhout, Zermezeele, Zuytpeene...

== Intercommunality ==
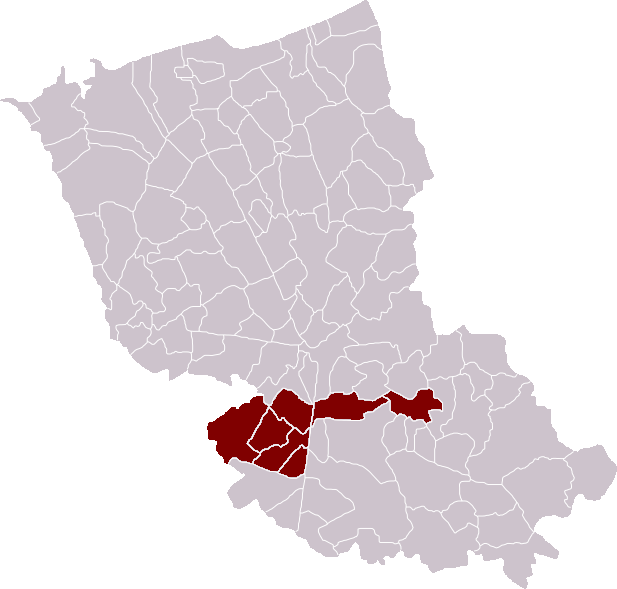
Localisation of Houtland community

There is also a former intercommunality called Communauté de communes de l'Houtland comprising Caëstre, Ebblinghem, Hondeghem, Lynde, Renescure, Sercus and Staple. It was merged into the new Communauté de communes de Flandre Intérieure in 2014.
