= Houtland =

The term Houtland (Dutch for 'Wood land') can refer to two regions in the historical Flanders:

- Houtland (France), a region in French Flanders, the French Westhoek
- Houtland (West Flanders), a region in the Belgian province of West Flanders, around Bruges
