= Sercus =

- Commune
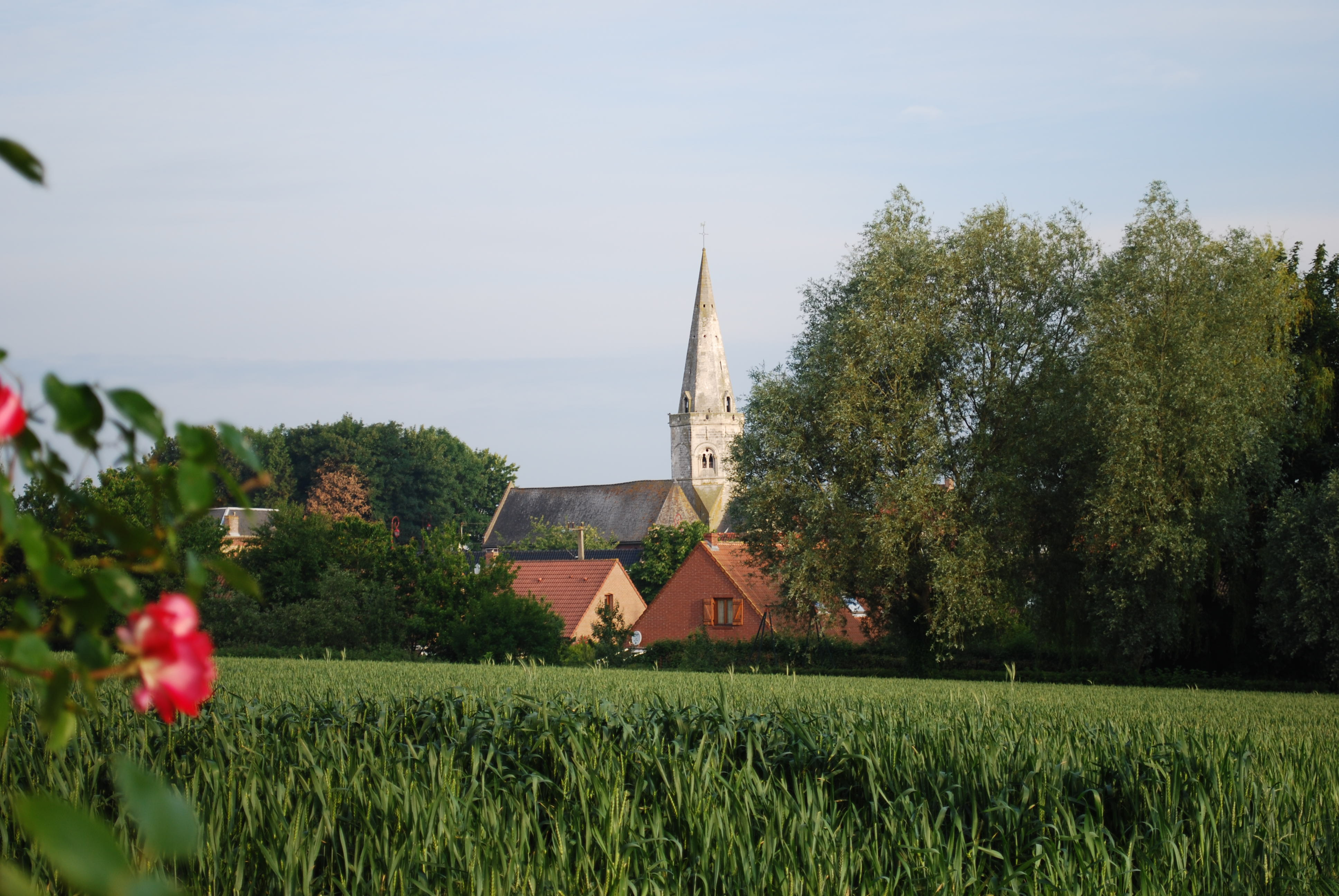
- A general view of Sercus

- Coat of arms
- Location of Sercus
- Location within France Location within Hauts-de-France
- Coordinates: 50°42′29″N 2°27′25″E
- Country: France
- Region: Hauts-de-France
- Department: Nord
- Arrondissement: Dunkerque
- Canton: Hazebrouck
- Intercommunality: CA Cœur de Flandre

Government
  - Mayor (2020–2026): Stéphanie Fenet
- Area^{1}: 4.98 km^{2} (1.92 sq mi)
- Elevation: 45 m (148 ft)
- Highest elevation: 70 m (230 ft)
- Lowest elevation: 41 m (135 ft)
- Population (2023): 486
  - Density: 97.6/km^{2} (253/sq mi)
- Demonym: Sercusiens
- Time zone: UTC+01:00 (CET)
  - Summer (DST): UTC+02:00 (CEST)
- INSEE/Postal code: 59568 /59173
- ^{1} French Land Register data, which excludes lakes, ponds, glaciers > 1 km^{2} (0.386 sq mi or 247 acres) and river estuaries.

Sercus (French pronunciation: [sɛʁky]; Dutch: Zerkel) is a commune in the Nord department in northern France.

== History ==
In the past, Sercus was on a Roman road that went from Cassel to Aire-sur-la-Lys, going through Oxelaëre, Staple, Wallon-Cappel, Thiennes and from Aire-sur-la-Lys continued towards Amiens via Saint-Pol-sur-Ternoise and Doullens.

During the Ancien Régime, the parish was included in the former Diocese of Thérouanne, and after it was abolished in 1557, the parish was transferred to the Diocese of Saint-Omer.

== Heraldry ==
| Arms of Sercus | The arms of Sercus are blazoned : Argent, a lion contourny sable, in chief a label of 3 points gules. |

== See also ==
- Communes of the Nord department
