= Blaringhem =

- Commune
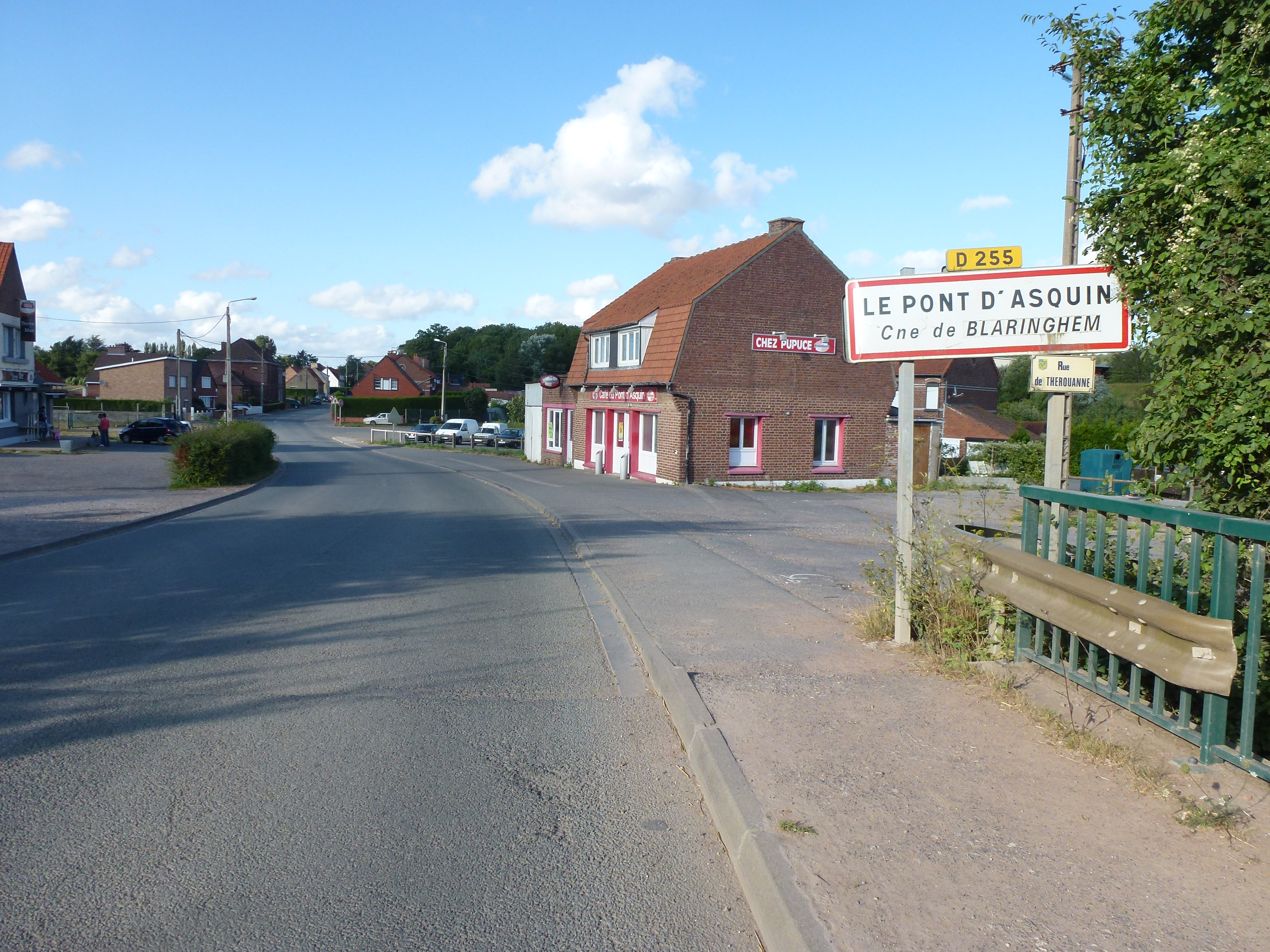
- The road into Blaringhem

- Coat of arms
- Location of Blaringhem
- Location within France Location within Hauts-de-France
- Coordinates: 50°41′33″N 2°24′16″E
- Country: France
- Region: Hauts-de-France
- Department: Nord
- Arrondissement: Dunkerque
- Canton: Hazebrouck
- Intercommunality: CA Cœur de Flandre

Government
  - Mayor (2020–2026): Régis Duquénoy
- Area^{1}: 18.23 km^{2} (7.04 sq mi)
- Elevation: 23 m (75 ft)
- Highest elevation: 76 m (249 ft)
- Lowest elevation: 17 m (56 ft)
- Population (2023): 2,008
  - Density: 110.1/km^{2} (285.3/sq mi)
- Time zone: UTC+01:00 (CET)
  - Summer (DST): UTC+02:00 (CEST)
- INSEE/Postal code: 59084 /59173
- ^{1} French Land Register data, which excludes lakes, ponds, glaciers > 1 km^{2} (0.386 sq mi or 247 acres) and river estuaries.

Blaringhem (French pronunciation: [blaʁɛ̃ɡɛm]; Dutch: Blaringem) is a commune in the Nord department in northern France.

== Population ==
Historical population

Year	Pop.	±% p.a.
1793	1,777	—
1821	1,815	+0.08%
1846	1,763	−0.12%
1872	1,885	+0.26%
1901	1,714	−0.33%
1926	1,622	−0.22%
1946	1,467	−0.50%
1962	1,465	−0.01%
1968	1,412	−0.61%

Year	Pop.	±% p.a.
1975	1,395	−0.17%
1982	1,358	−0.38%
1990	1,611	+2.16%
1999	1,791	+1.18%
2007	2,034	+1.60%
2012	2,023	−0.11%
2017	2,069	+0.45%
2023	2,008	−0.50%

Source: EHESS and INSEE (1968-2023)

== Heraldry ==
Arms of Blaringhem	The arms of Blaringhem are blazoned : Quarterly 1&4: Azure, a chevron between 3 mullets Or; 2&3: Or, a chevron azure, between 3 Moorsheads sable with headband argent.

== See also ==
- Communes of the Nord department
