= Canton of Hazebrouck =

Coordinates: 50.72°N 2.54°E

The canton of Hazebrouck is an administrative division of the Nord department, northern France. It was created at the French canton reorganisation which came into effect in March 2015. Its seat is in Hazebrouck.

It consists of the following communes:

1. Blaringhem
2. Boëseghem
3. Ebblinghem
4. Estaires
5. La Gorgue
6. Haverskerque
7. Hazebrouck
8. Lynde
9. Merville
10. Morbecque
11. Neuf-Berquin
12. Renescure
13. Sercus
14. Steenbecque
15. Thiennes
16. Wallon-Cappel
