= Westhoek (region) =

Franco-Belgian region

Coordinates: 50°54′N 2°36′E

Location of French and Belgian Westhoeks

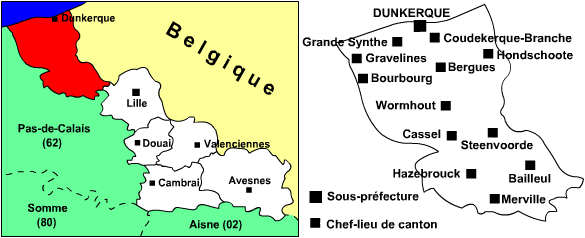
The arrondissement of Dunkirk roughly corresponding to French Westhoek

Westhoek (Dutch: [ˈʋɛstɦuk], French: [wɛstuk]; Dutch for 'West Corner') or Maritime Flanders (French: Flandre maritime) is a region in Belgium and France and includes the following areas:

- Belgian Westhoek (Dutch: Belgische Westhoek) including the West Flanders arrondissements of Diksmuide, Ypres, and Veurne including the cities of Veurne, Poperinge, Wervik, Ypres, De Panne, Langemark-Poelkapelle, Diksmuide and Koekelare. However, the three Belgian coast municipalities of De Panne, Koksijde, and Nieuwpoort are frequently considered a separate region known as the Belgian or Flemish West Coast (Westkust).
- French Westhoek (French: Westhoek français; Dutch: Franse Westhoek), roughly the arrondissement of Dunkirk, including the cities of Dunkirk, Gravelines, and Hazebrouck, itself part of a larger area known as French Flanders.

Outside Dutch-language sources, Westhoek sometimes refers only to French Westhoek.

== French Westhoek ==
=== Geography ===
French Westhoek is the northern part of French Flanders, lying between the river Lys and the North Sea on the Franco-Belgian border. It nearly corresponds with the Arrondissement of Dunkirk (the northwestern quarter of the Department of Nord) but with the some areas of the arrondissement falling outside Westhoek while some areas of traditional Westhoek lie in the neighbouring Department of Pas-de-Calais.

French Westhoek consists of three natural regions:

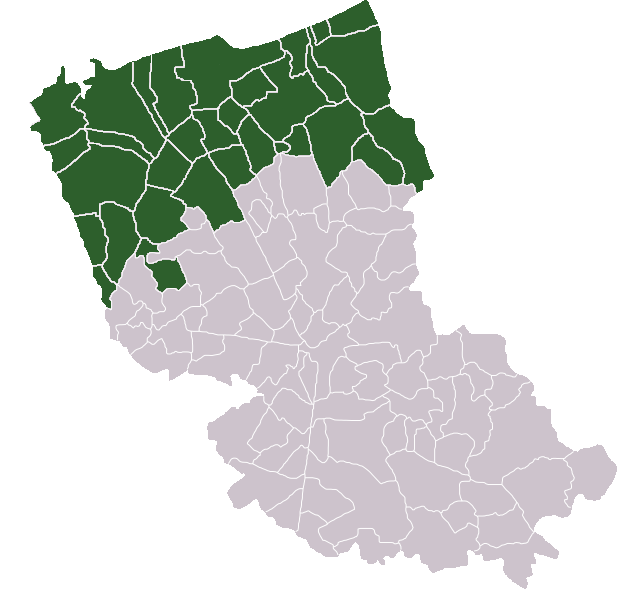
1. Blootland (Dutch for "naked land") or the Maritime Plain (French: Plaine maritime) including Dunkirk, Bourbourg, Bergues, and Hondschoote
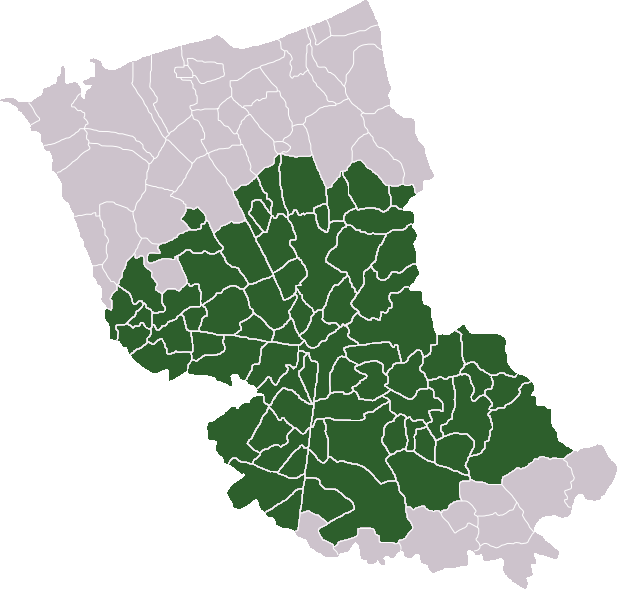
2. Houtland (Dutch for "woodland"), including Wormhout, Cassel, Hazebrouck, and part of Bailleul
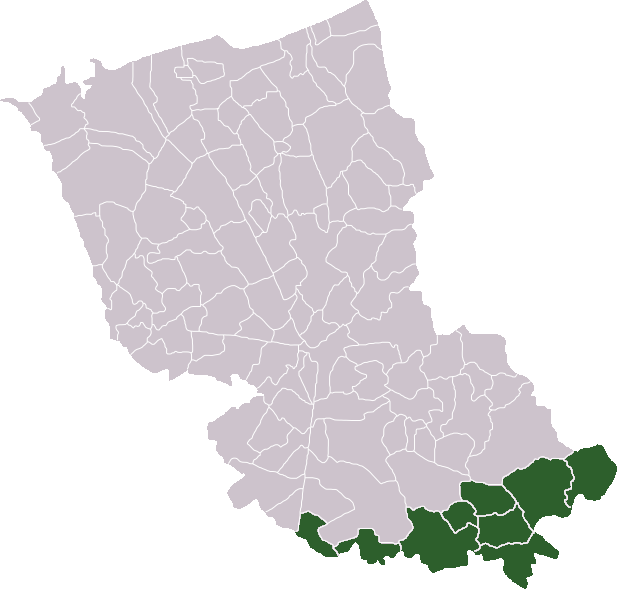
3. The Lys Valley (French: Vallée de la Lys or Plaine de la Lys; Dutch: Leiedal) including Merville, Steenwerck, and part of Bailleul

=== Language ===
The traditional language of French Westhoek is a Dutch dialect called West Flemish, the French subdialect of which is known as French Flemish. It was once the dominant language of the region, but a long-time policy of Francization, starting with the introduction of French as the language of education in 1853, has led to the replacement of Dutch with French in the region. Of the population of the approximately 380,000 inhabitants of French Westhoek, there are now between 10,000 and 20,000 daily speakers of West Flemish, many of whom live in the arrondissement and city of Dunkirk, and twice as many who occasionally use the dialect. Flemish was recently recognised as a regional language of France but there are no bilingual street signs and French remains the only official language in the area.

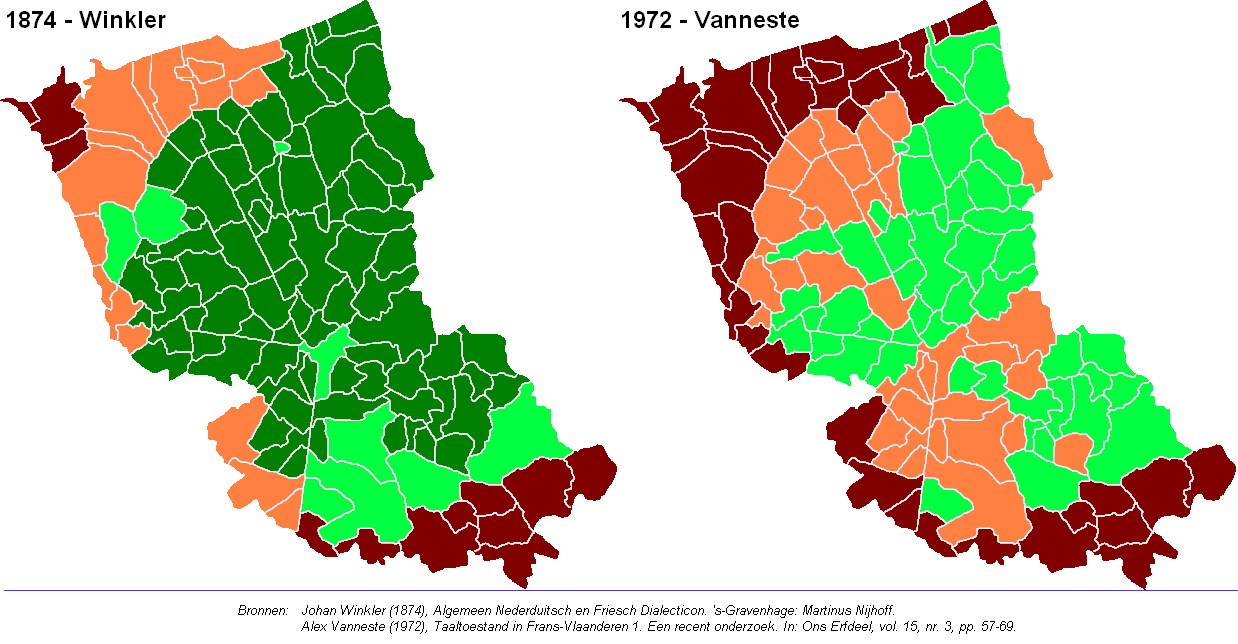
Changes in language in the arrondissement of Dunkirk between 1874 and 1972. Evidently, the Flemish-speaking population has declined considerably since 1972. Predominantly monolingual French-speaking area Bilingual area with French-speaking majority Bilingual area with Flemish-speaking majority Predominantly monolingual Flemish-speaking area

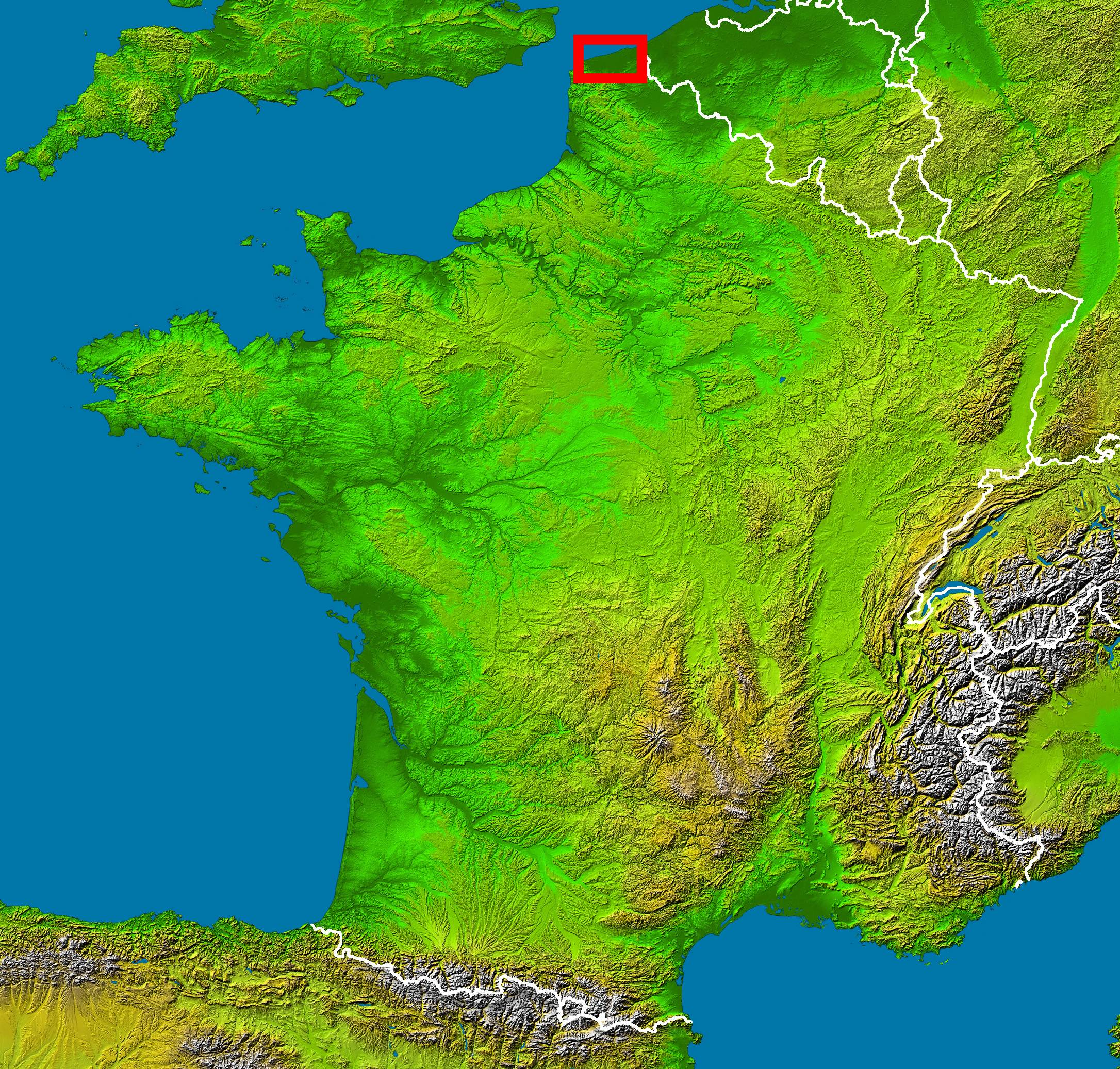
Blootland country localization in France viewed by NASA Shuttle radar-imaging

Westhoek map with historical language divisions and Dutch toponyms

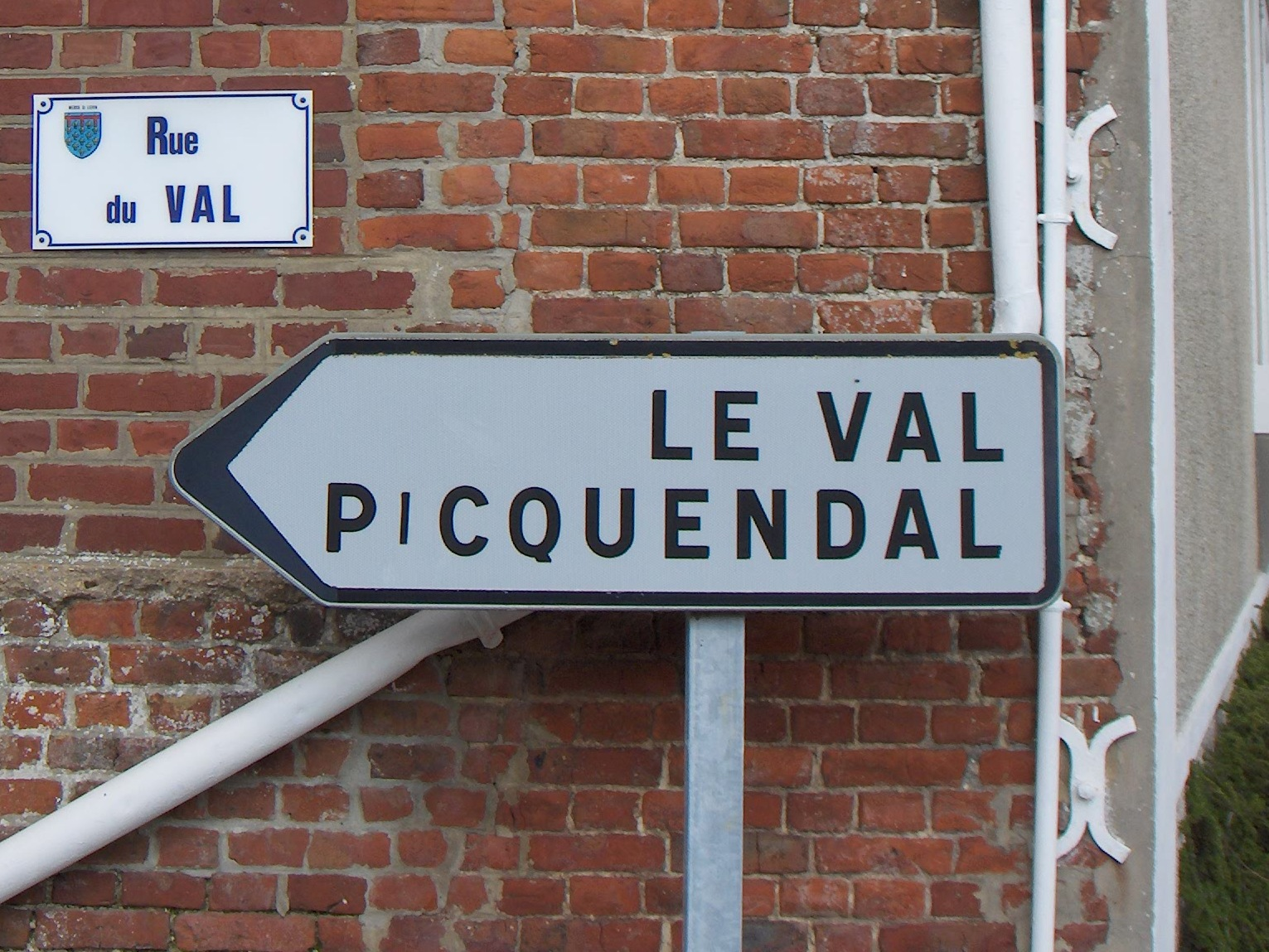
A street sign in Merck-Saint-Liévin, showing Germanic influence in local toponyms. The name Picquendal corresponds to the modern Dutch Piekendal.

The French Flemish dialect has had significant influence on local toponyms. For example, the French Westhoek towns of Robecq and Dunkirk are derived from the Flemish names of Robeke and Duinkerke.

== Sources and references ==
- Ethnologue Report for West Flemish
- Flemish in France detailed overview
