= Thiennes =

- Commune
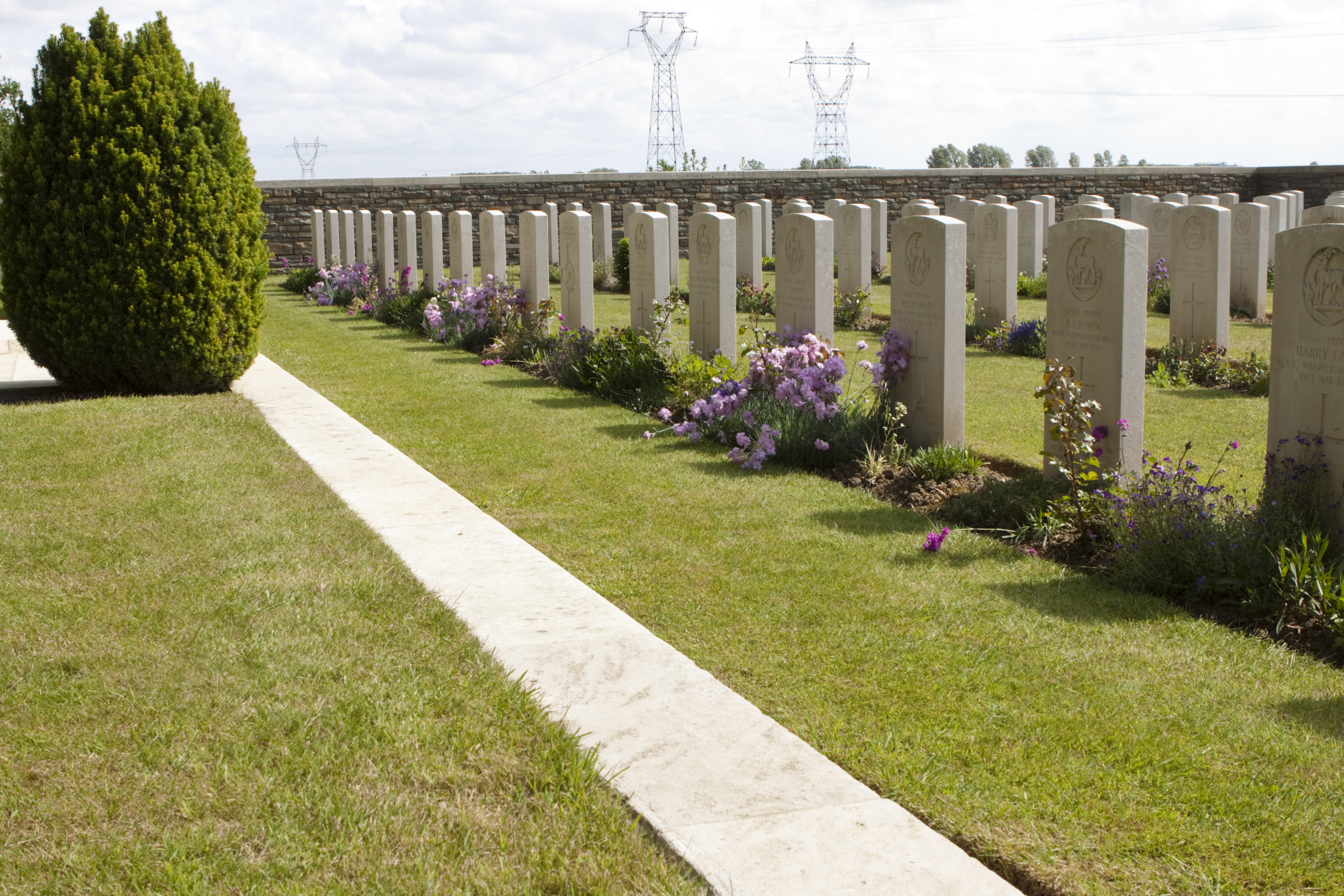
- The British war cemetery in Thiennes

- Coat of arms
- Location of Thiennes
- Location within France Location within Hauts-de-France
- Coordinates: 50°39′09″N 2°28′04″E
- Country: France
- Region: Hauts-de-France
- Department: Nord
- Arrondissement: Dunkerque
- Canton: Hazebrouck
- Intercommunality: CA Cœur de Flandre

Government
  - Mayor (2020–2026): Eddie Boulier
- Area^{1}: 7.54 km^{2} (2.91 sq mi)
- Elevation: 20 m (66 ft)
- Highest elevation: 37 m (121 ft)
- Lowest elevation: 15 m (49 ft)
- Population (2023): 920
  - Density: 120/km^{2} (320/sq mi)
- Demonym: Thiennois(es)
- Time zone: UTC+01:00 (CET)
  - Summer (DST): UTC+02:00 (CEST)
- INSEE/Postal code: 59590 /59189
- ^{1} French Land Register data, which excludes lakes, ponds, glaciers > 1 km^{2} (0.386 sq mi or 247 acres) and river estuaries.

Thiennes (French pronunciation: [tjɛn]) is a commune in the Nord department in northern France.

== Heraldry ==
Arms of Thiennes	The arms of Thiennes are blazoned : Or, an inescutcheon argent, a lion gules, armed langue and crowned Or within a bordure azure, all within a bordure azure.

== See also ==
- Communes of the Nord department
