= Lynde =

- Commune
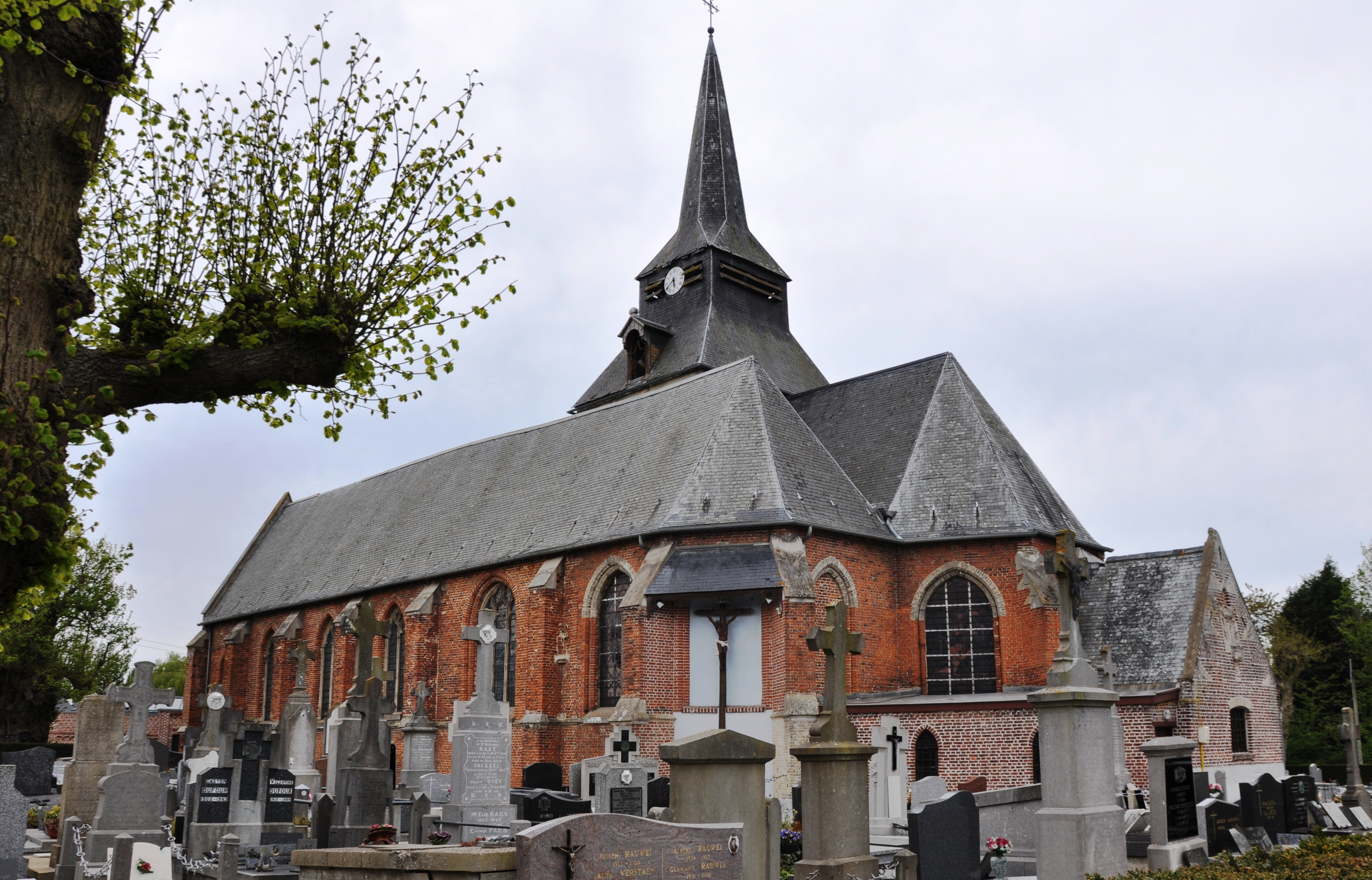
- The church in Lynde

- Coat of arms
- Location of Lynde
- Location within France Location within Hauts-de-France
- Coordinates: 50°42′45″N 2°25′13″E
- Country: France
- Region: Hauts-de-France
- Department: Nord
- Arrondissement: Dunkerque
- Canton: Hazebrouck
- Intercommunality: CA Cœur de Flandre

Government
  - Mayor (2020–2026): Jean-Michel Plaetevoet
- Area^{1}: 9.07 km^{2} (3.50 sq mi)
- Elevation: 61 m (200 ft)
- Highest elevation: 72 m (236 ft)
- Lowest elevation: 34 m (112 ft)
- Population (2023): 783
  - Density: 86.3/km^{2} (224/sq mi)
- Time zone: UTC+01:00 (CET)
  - Summer (DST): UTC+02:00 (CEST)
- INSEE/Postal code: 59366 /59173
- ^{1} French Land Register data, which excludes lakes, ponds, glaciers > 1 km^{2} (0.386 sq mi or 247 acres) and river estuaries.

Lynde (French pronunciation: [lɛ̃d]; Dutch: Linde) is a commune in the Nord department in northern France. It is 10 km (6.2 mi) west of Hazebrouck.

== Heraldry ==
Arms of Lynde	The arms of Lynde are blazoned : Argent, 3 mallets sable.

== See also ==
- Communes of the Nord department
