= Ebblinghem =

Ebblinghem Ebblingem
- Commune
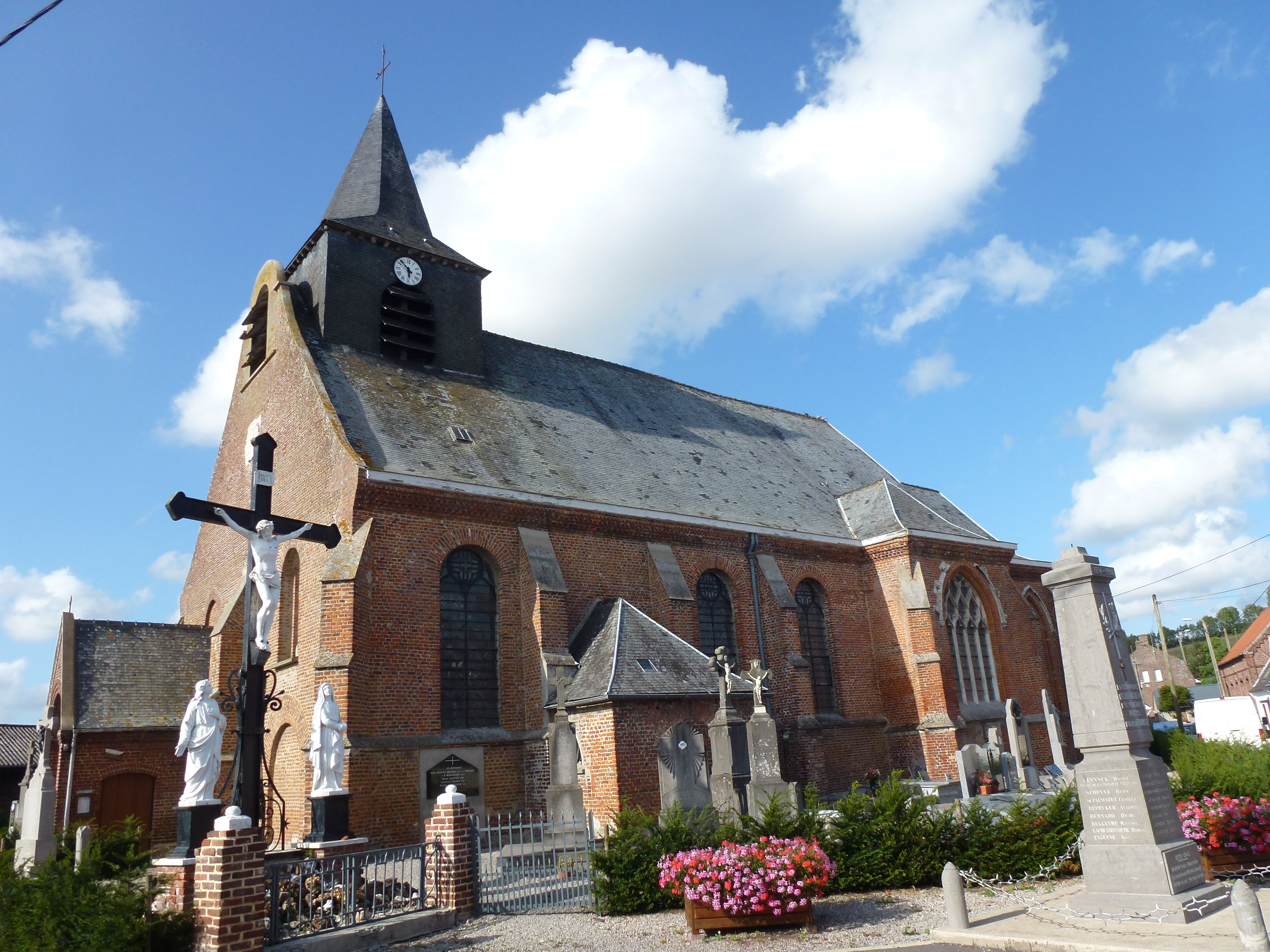
- The church in Ebblinghem

- Coat of arms
- Location of Ebblinghem
- Location within France Location within Hauts-de-France
- Coordinates: 50°43′58″N 2°24′37″E
- Country: France
- Region: Hauts-de-France
- Department: Nord
- Arrondissement: Dunkerque
- Canton: Hazebrouck
- Intercommunality: CA Cœur de Flandre

Government
  - Mayor (2020–2026): Sandrine Keignaert
- Area^{1}: 9.2 km^{2} (3.6 sq mi)
- Elevation: 36 m (118 ft)
- Highest elevation: 70 m (230 ft)
- Lowest elevation: 29 m (95 ft)
- Population (2023): 660
  - Density: 72/km^{2} (190/sq mi)
- Demonym: Ebblinghemois (es)
- Time zone: UTC+01:00 (CET)
  - Summer (DST): UTC+02:00 (CEST)
- INSEE/Postal code: 59184 /59173
- ^{1} French Land Register data, which excludes lakes, ponds, glaciers > 1 km^{2} (0.386 sq mi or 247 acres) and river estuaries.

Ebblinghem (French pronunciation: [ɛblɛ̃ɡɛm]; from Flemish; Ebblingem in modern Dutch spelling) is a commune in the Nord department in northern France.

Ebblinghem is the site of the Ebblinghem Military Cemetery, which contains over 440 graves, most of which are servicemen from Commonwealth countries killed in the First World War.

== Population ==
Historical population
Year	Pop.	±% p.a.
1968	420	—
1975	413	−0.24%
1982	446	+1.10%
1990	501	+1.46%
1999	554	+1.12%
2007	580	+0.57%
2012	656	+2.49%
2017	673	+0.51%
2023	660	−0.32%
Source: INSEE

== Heraldry ==
Arms of Ebblinghem	The arms of Ebblinghem are blazoned : Argent, a fess azure between 7 ermine spots (4 and 3) (sable).

== See also ==
- Communes of the Nord department
