= Wallon-Cappel =

- Commune
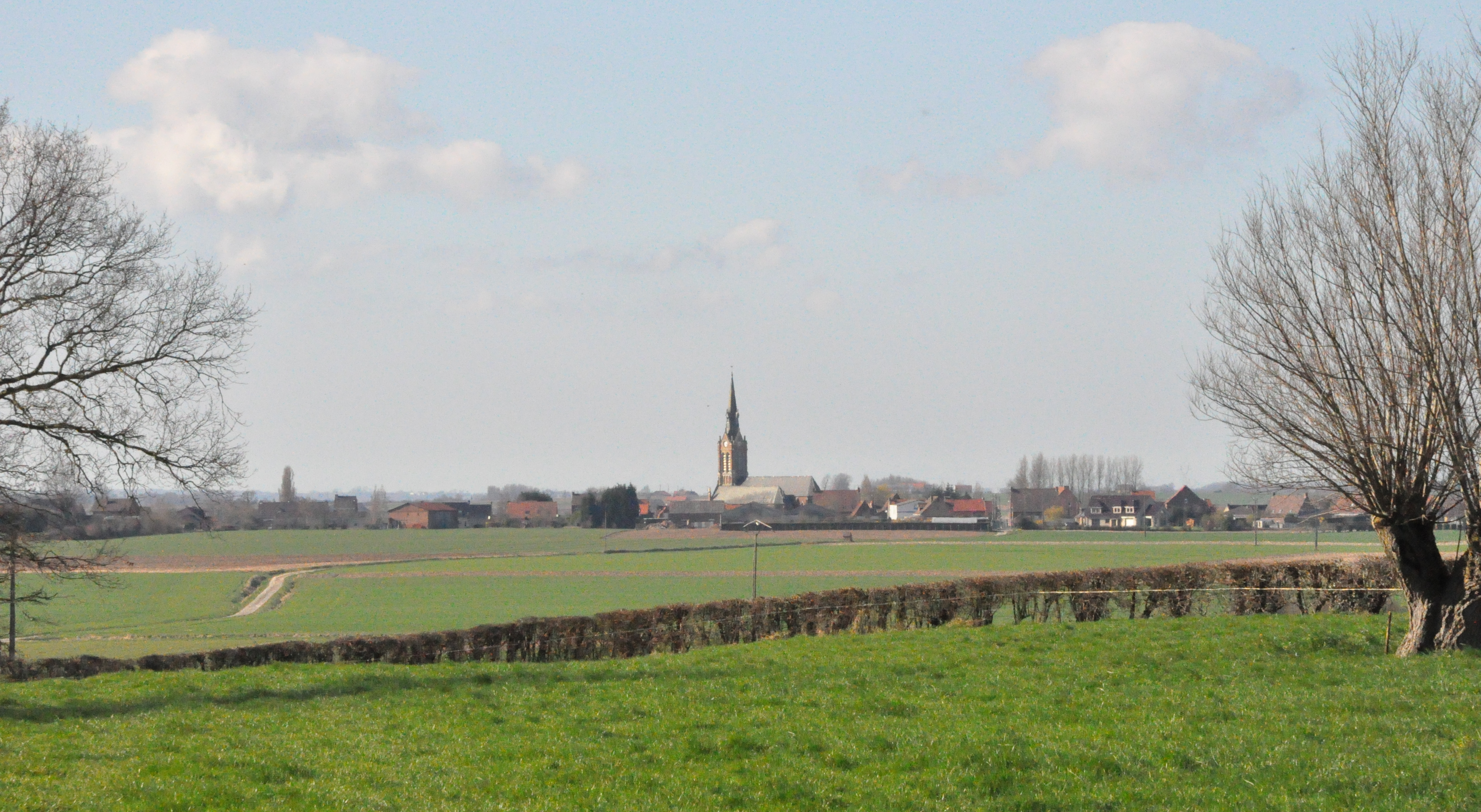
- A general view of Wallon-Cappel

- Coat of arms
- Location of Wallon-Cappel
- Location within France Location within Hauts-de-France
- Coordinates: 50°43′41″N 2°28′27″E
- Country: France
- Region: Hauts-de-France
- Department: Nord
- Arrondissement: Dunkerque
- Canton: Hazebrouck
- Intercommunality: CA Cœur de Flandre

Government
  - Mayor (2020–2026): Éric Smal
- Area^{1}: 5.44 km^{2} (2.10 sq mi)
- Elevation: 43 m (141 ft)
- Highest elevation: 69 m (226 ft)
- Lowest elevation: 30 m (98 ft)
- Population (2023): 808
  - Density: 149/km^{2} (385/sq mi)
- Time zone: UTC+01:00 (CET)
  - Summer (DST): UTC+02:00 (CEST)
- INSEE/Postal code: 59634 /59190
- ^{1} French Land Register data, which excludes lakes, ponds, glaciers > 1 km^{2} (0.386 sq mi or 247 acres) and river estuaries.

Wallon-Cappel (French pronunciation: [walɔ̃ kapɛl]; Dutch: Waalskappel) is a commune in the Nord department in northern France.

== Heraldry ==
Arms of Wallon-Cappel	The arms of Wallon-Cappel are blazoned : Or, 2 fesses gules.

== Population ==
Historical population
Year	Pop.	±% p.a.
1968	452	—
1975	460	+0.25%
1982	546	+2.48%
1990	653	+2.26%
1999	831	+2.71%
2007	903	+1.04%
2012	869	−0.76%
2017	811	−1.37%
2023	808	−0.06%
Source: INSEE

== See also ==
- Communes of the Nord department
