= Sainte-Marie-Cappel =

- Commune
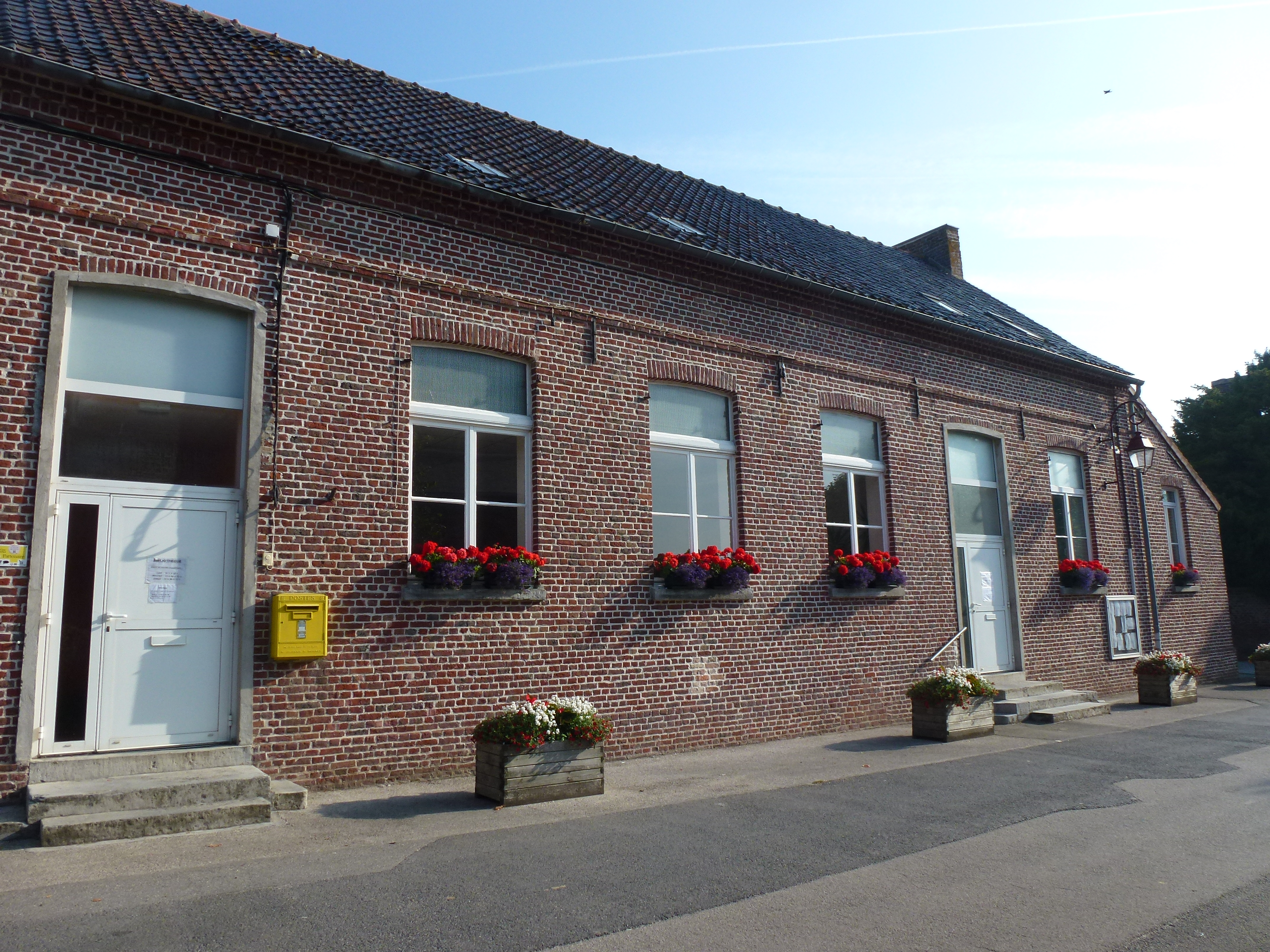
- The town hall in Sainte-Marie-Cappel

- Coat of arms
- Location of Sainte-Marie-Cappel
- Location within France Location within Hauts-de-France
- Coordinates: 50°47′01″N 2°30′28″E
- Country: France
- Region: Hauts-de-France
- Department: Nord
- Arrondissement: Dunkerque
- Canton: Bailleul
- Intercommunality: CA Cœur de Flandre

Government
  - Mayor (2020–2026): Bertrand Crépin
- Area^{1}: 7.56 km^{2} (2.92 sq mi)
- Elevation: 44 m (144 ft)
- Population (2023): 825
  - Density: 109/km^{2} (283/sq mi)
- Time zone: UTC+01:00 (CET)
  - Summer (DST): UTC+02:00 (CEST)
- INSEE/Postal code: 59536 /59670
- ^{1} French Land Register data, which excludes lakes, ponds, glaciers > 1 km^{2} (0.386 sq mi or 247 acres) and river estuaries.

Sainte-Marie-Cappel (French pronunciation: [sɛ̃t maʁi kapɛl]; West Flemish: Sint-Maria-Kapel) is a commune in the Nord department in northern France.

The small river Peene Becque has its source in Sante-Marie-Cappel.

== Heraldry ==
Arms of Sainte-Marie-Cappel	The arms of Sainte-Marie-Cappel are blazoned : Ermine, a fess gules. (Sainte-Marie-Cappel and Staple use the same arms.)

== Demography ==
Historical population
Year	Pop.	±% p.a.
1968	356	—
1975	314	−1.78%
1982	486	+6.44%
1990	591	+2.48%
1999	688	+1.70%
2007	828	+2.34%
2012	846	+0.43%
2017	877	+0.72%
2023	825	−1.01%
Source: INSEE

== See also ==
- Communes of the Nord department
