= Houtkerque =

Houtkerque Houtkerke
- Commune
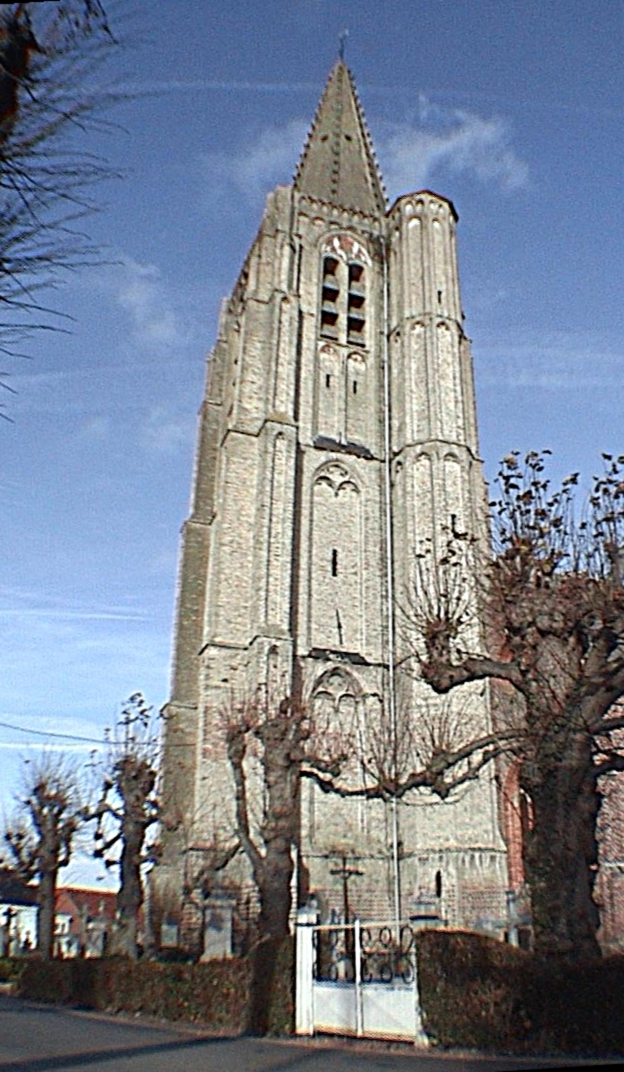
- Église Saint-Antoine d'Houtkerque

- Coat of arms
- Location of Houtkerque
- Location within France Location within Hauts-de-France
- Coordinates: 50°52′12″N 2°35′46″E
- Country: France
- Region: Hauts-de-France
- Department: Nord
- Arrondissement: Dunkirk
- Canton: Wormhout
- Intercommunality: CA Cœur de Flandre

Government
  - Mayor (2020–2026): Samuel Bever
- Area^{1}: 13.13 km^{2} (5.07 sq mi)
- Elevation: 18 m (59 ft)
- Highest elevation: 22 m (72 ft)
- Lowest elevation: 2 m (6.6 ft)
- Population (2023): 978
  - Density: 74.5/km^{2} (193/sq mi)
- Demonym: Houtkerquois
- Time zone: UTC+01:00 (CET)
  - Summer (DST): UTC+02:00 (CEST)
- INSEE/Postal code: 59318 /59470
- ^{1} French Land Register data, which excludes lakes, ponds, glaciers > 1 km^{2} (0.386 sq mi or 247 acres) and river estuaries.

Houtkerque (French pronunciation: [utkɛʁk]; from Dutch: Houtkerke) is a commune in the Nord department in northern France. It is located near the Belgian border, 8 km (5.0 mi) north of Steenvoorde, on the Steenvoorde/Hondschoote road. The river Yser crosses the border at Houtkerque.

Houtkerque saw much action during World War I. Seven Commonwealth war graves are situated within Houtkerque's church.

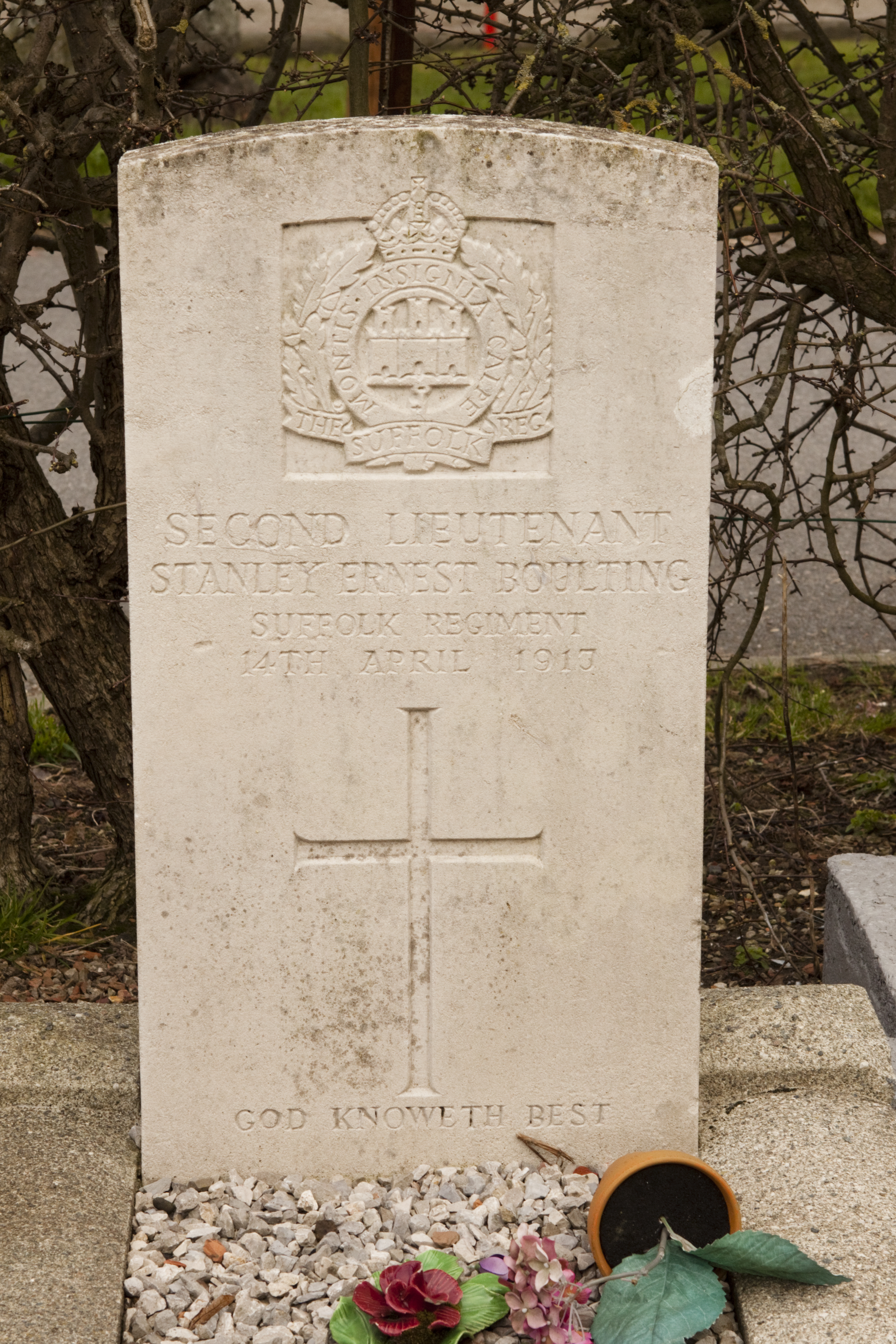
Gravestone

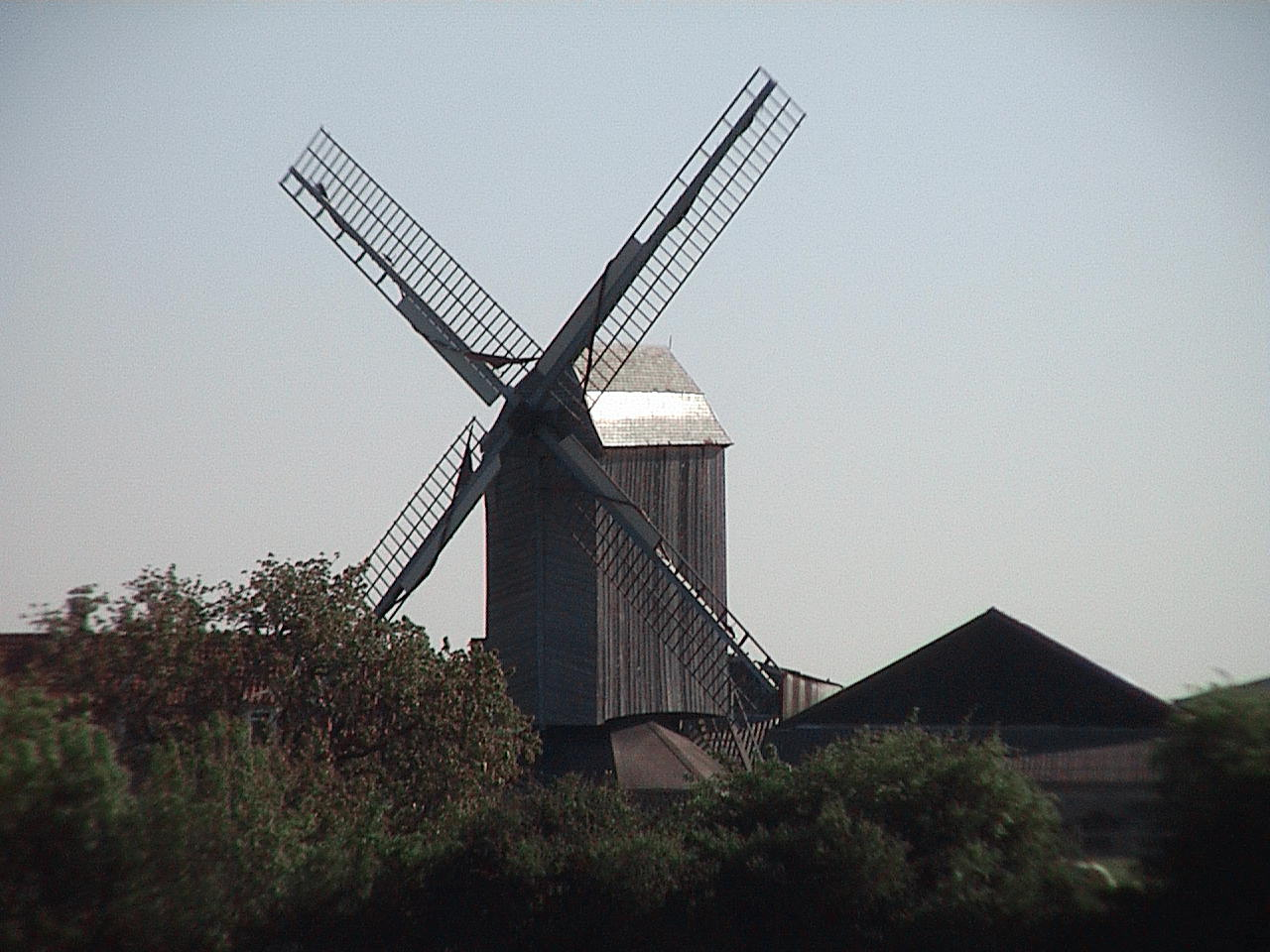
Windmill "Hofland"

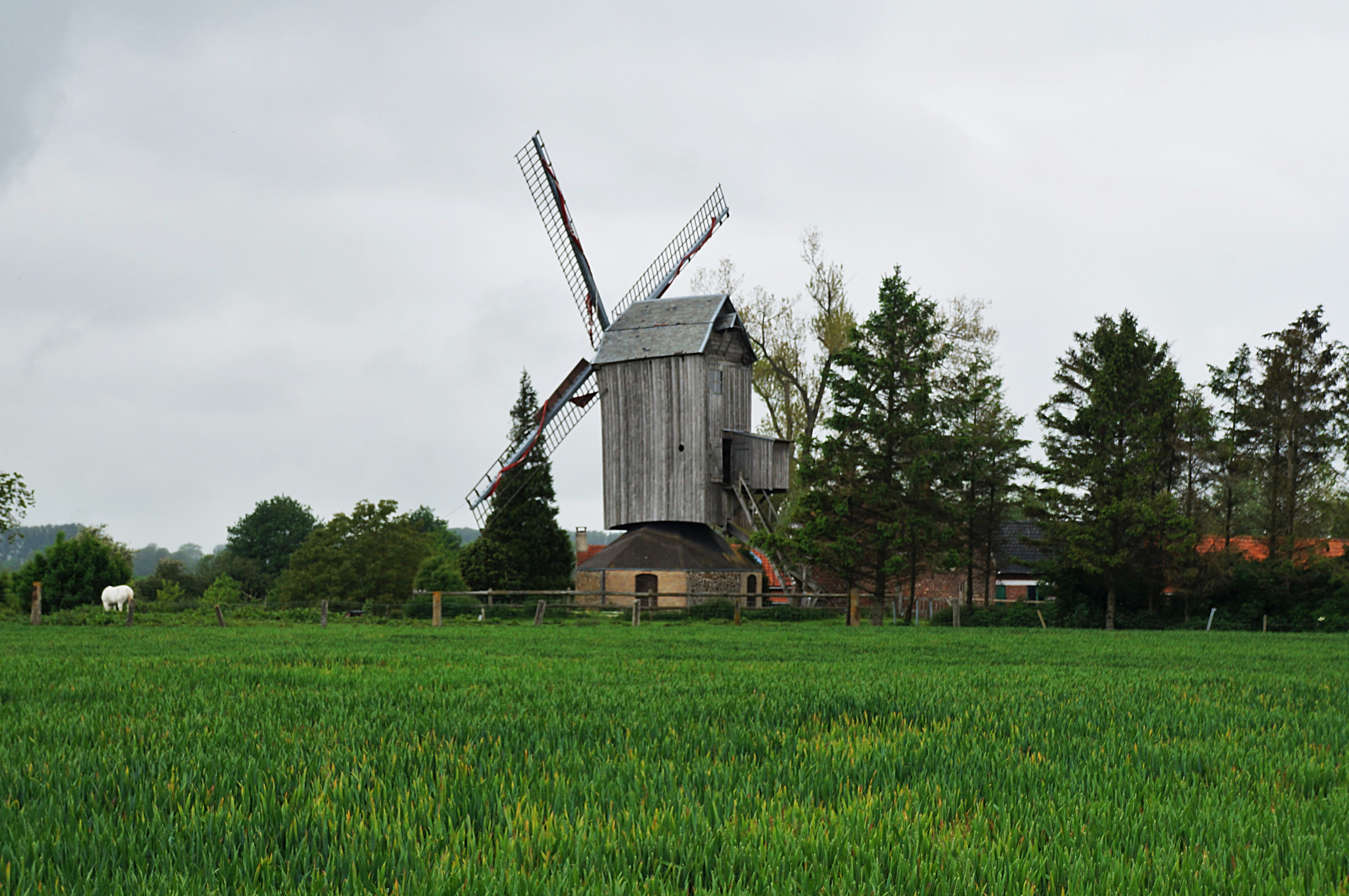
Mill of Hofland also called mill Accou, Houtkerque, North, France.

== Heraldry ==
Arms of Houtkerque	The arms of Houtkerque are blazoned : Or, 3 horns sable.

== See also ==
- Communes of the Nord department
