= Communauté d'agglomération Cœur de Flandre =

Cœur de Flandre
- Communauté d'agglomération
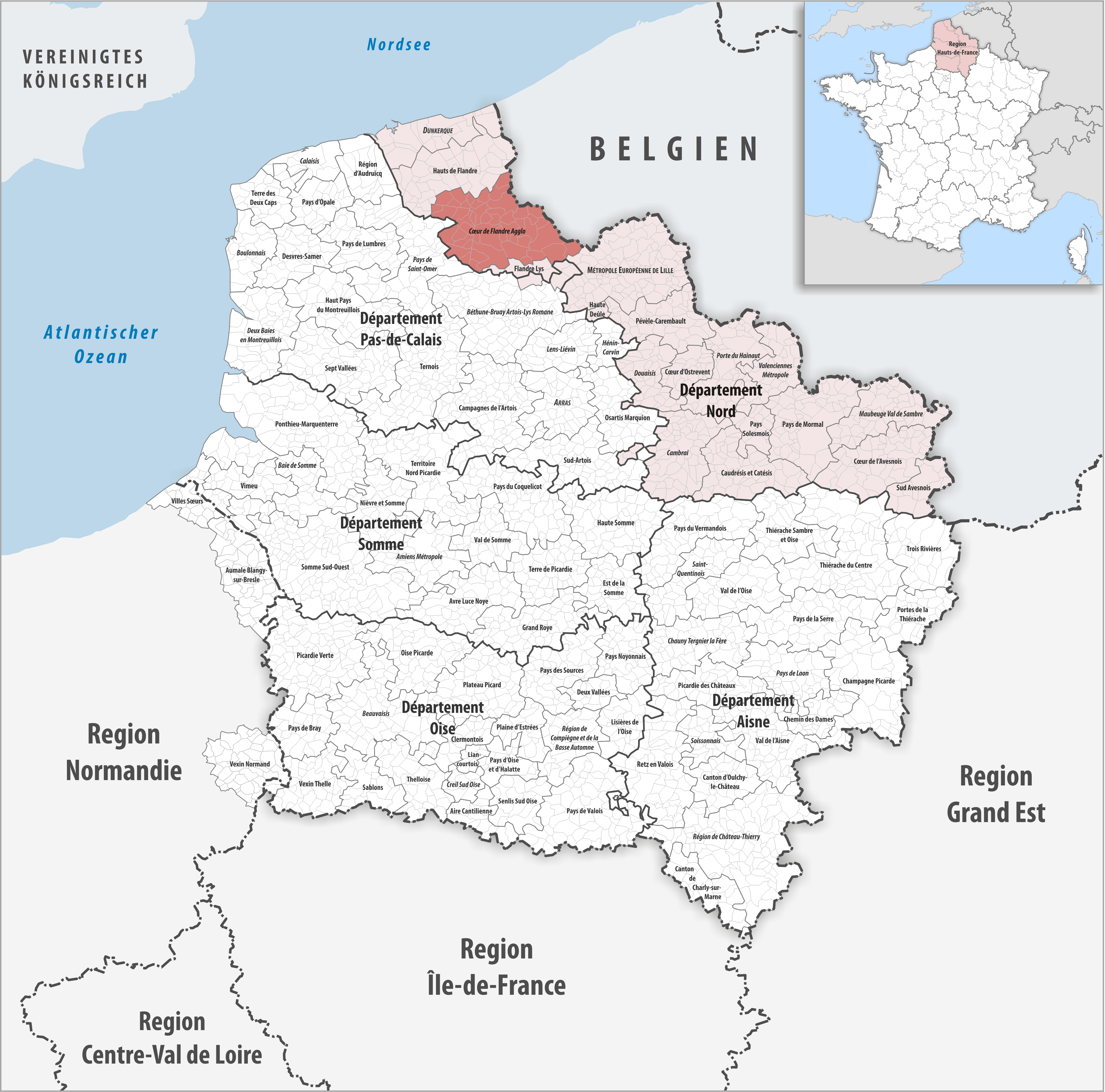
- Location within the Hauts-de-France region.
- Coordinates: 50°44′N 02°32′E
- Country: France
- Region: Hauts-de-France
- Department: Nord
- No. of communes: {{{nbcomm}}}
- Established: 2013
- Area: 630.4 km^{2} (243.4 sq mi)
- Population (2021): 102,489
  - Density: 162.6/km^{2} (421.1/sq mi)
- Website: www.ca-coeurdeflandre.fr

The Communauté d'agglomération Cœur de Flandre is an intercommunal structure in the Nord department, in the Hauts-de-France region, northern France. It was created in December 2013 as communauté de communes de Flandre Intérieure, and was transformed into a communauté d'agglomération in December 2023. Its seat is in Hazebrouck. Its area is 630.4 km^{2}. Its population was 102,489 in 2021.

== Composition ==
The communauté d'agglomération consists of the following 50 communes:

1. Arnèke
2. Bailleul
3. Bavinchove
4. Berthen
5. Blaringhem
6. Boeschepe
7. Boëseghem
8. Borre
9. Buysscheure
10. Caëstre
11. Cassel
12. Le Doulieu
13. Ebblinghem
14. Eecke
15. Flêtre
16. Godewaersvelde
17. Hardifort
18. Hazebrouck
19. Hondeghem
20. Houtkerque
21. Lynde
22. Merris
23. Méteren
24. Morbecque
25. Neuf-Berquin
26. Nieppe
27. Noordpeene
28. Ochtezeele
29. Oudezeele
30. Oxelaëre
31. Pradelles
32. Renescure
33. Rubrouck
34. Sainte-Marie-Cappel
35. Saint-Jans-Cappel
36. Saint-Sylvestre-Cappel
37. Sercus
38. Staple
39. Steenbecque
40. Steenvoorde
41. Steenwerck
42. Strazeele
43. Terdeghem
44. Thiennes
45. Vieux-Berquin
46. Wallon-Cappel
47. Wemaers-Cappel
48. Winnezeele
49. Zermezeele
50. Zuytpeene
