= Bavinchove =

Bavinchove Bavinkhove
- Commune
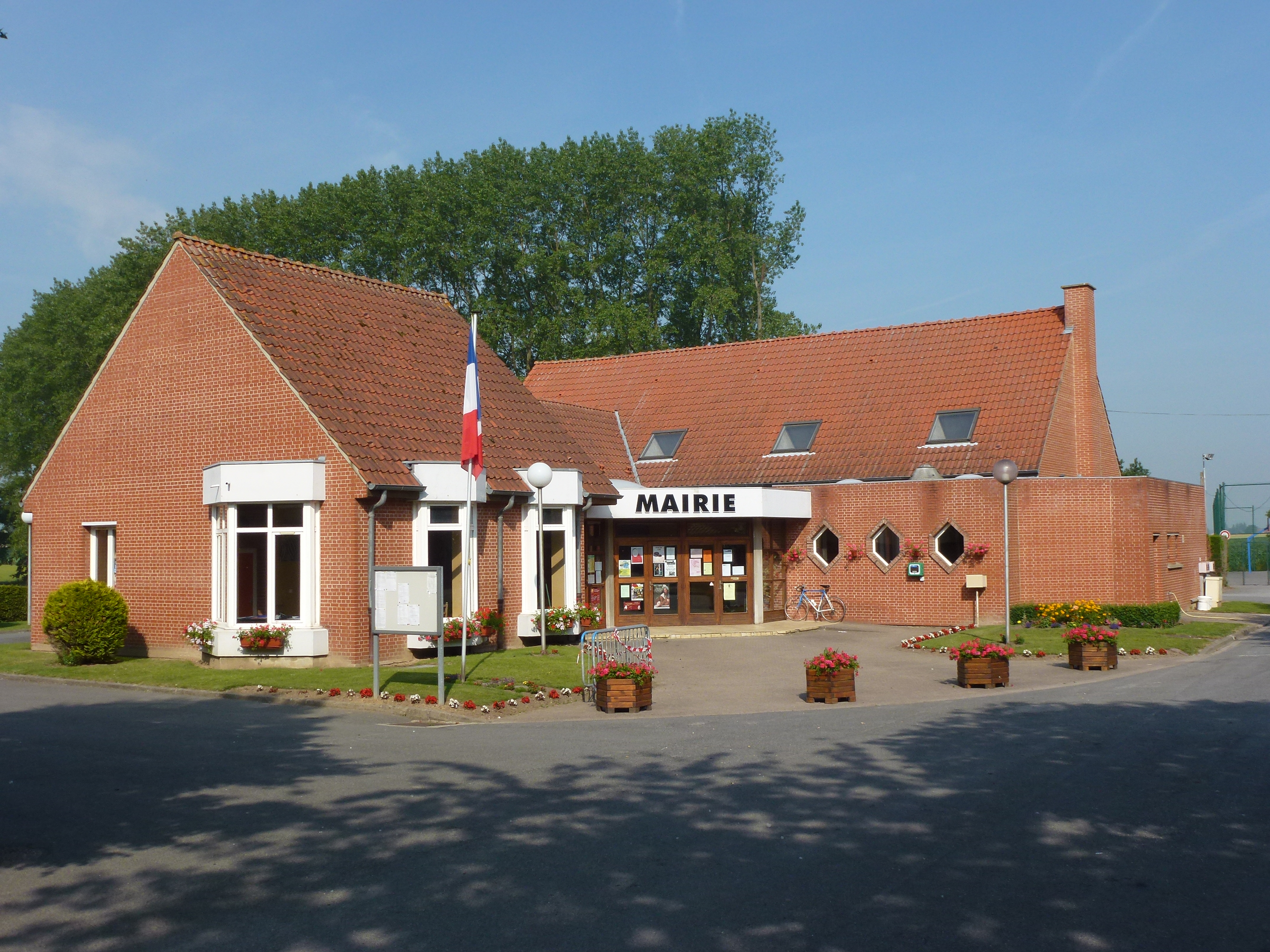
- Hall (Fr:mairie, nl:Wethuis)

- Coat of arms
- Location of Bavinchove
- Location within France Location within Hauts-de-France
- Coordinates: 50°47′05″N 2°27′18″E
- Country: France
- Region: Hauts-de-France
- Department: Nord
- Arrondissement: Dunkerque
- Canton: Wormhout
- Intercommunality: CA Cœur de Flandre

Government
  - Mayor (2020–2026): Serge Laconte
- Area^{1}: 8.31 km^{2} (3.21 sq mi)
- Elevation: 38 m (125 ft)
- Highest elevation: 93 m (305 ft)
- Lowest elevation: 15 m (49 ft)
- Population (2023): 1,045
  - Density: 126/km^{2} (326/sq mi)
- Time zone: UTC+01:00 (CET)
  - Summer (DST): UTC+02:00 (CEST)
- INSEE/Postal code: 59054 /59670
- ^{1} French Land Register data, which excludes lakes, ponds, glaciers > 1 km^{2} (0.386 sq mi or 247 acres) and river estuaries.

Bavinchove (French pronunciation: [bavɛ̃kɔv]; from Dutch; Bavinkhove in modern Dutch spelling) is a commune in the Nord department in northern France.

== Population ==
Historical population
Year	Pop.	±% p.a.
1968	745	—
1975	741	−0.08%
1982	747	+0.12%
1990	848	+1.60%
1999	955	+1.33%
2007	937	−0.24%
2012	930	−0.15%
2017	972	+0.89%
2023	1,045	+1.21%
Source: INSEE

== Heraldry ==
Arms of Bavinchove	The arms of Bavinchove are blazoned : Barry Or and azure.

== See also ==
- Communes of the Nord department
