= Steenbecque =

Steenbecque Steenbeke
- Commune
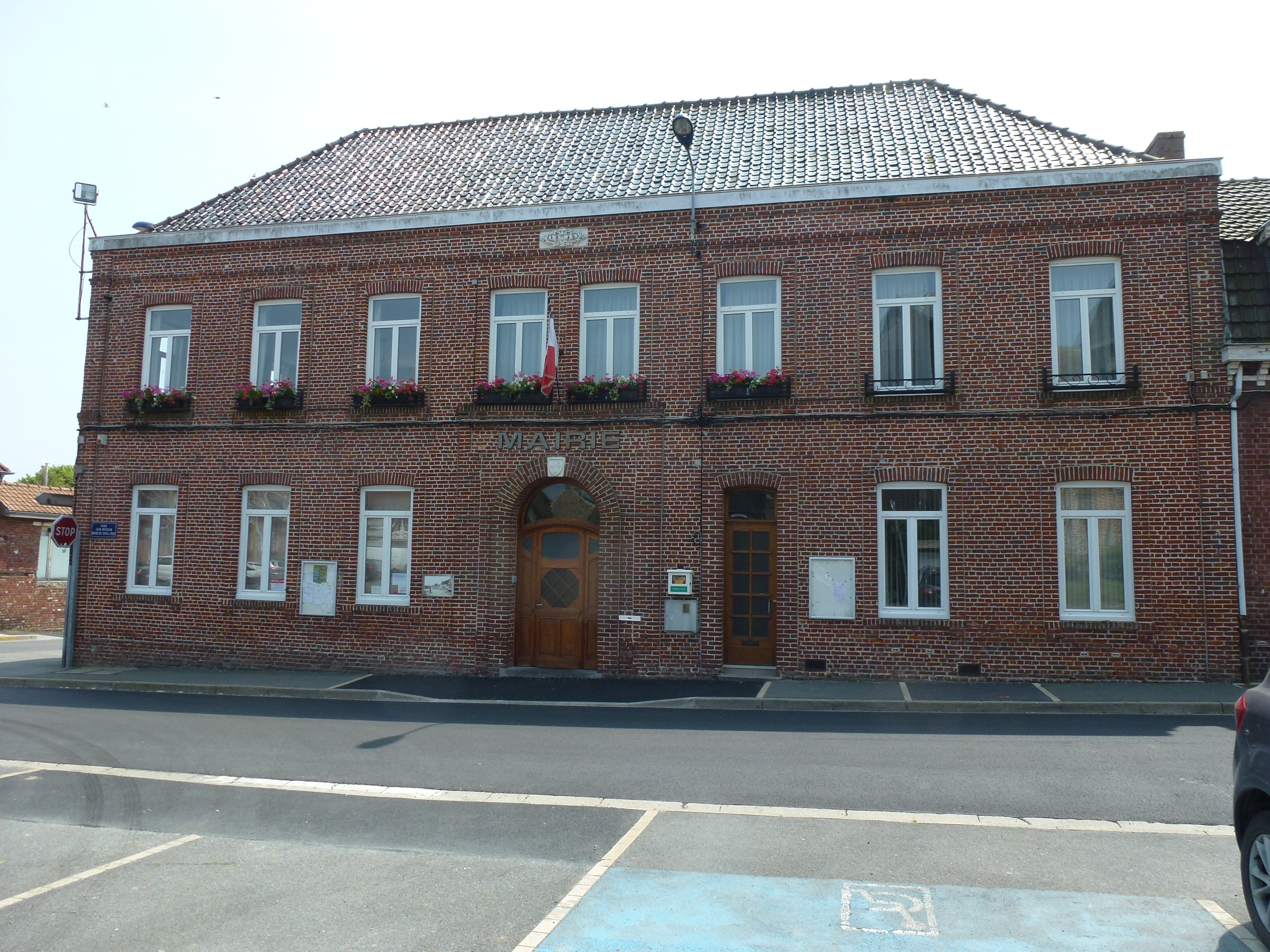
- The town hall in Steenbecque

- Coat of arms
- Location of Steenbecque
- Location within France Location within Hauts-de-France
- Coordinates: 50°40′32″N 2°28′55″E
- Country: France
- Region: Hauts-de-France
- Department: Nord
- Arrondissement: Dunkerque
- Canton: Hazebrouck
- Intercommunality: CA Cœur de Flandre

Government
  - Mayor (2020–2026): Carole Delaire
- Area^{1}: 11.96 km^{2} (4.62 sq mi)
- Elevation: 18 m (59 ft)
- Highest elevation: 65 m (213 ft)
- Lowest elevation: 17 m (56 ft)
- Population (2023): 1,602
  - Density: 133.9/km^{2} (346.9/sq mi)
- Time zone: UTC+01:00 (CET)
  - Summer (DST): UTC+02:00 (CEST)
- INSEE/Postal code: 59578 /59189
- ^{1} French Land Register data, which excludes lakes, ponds, glaciers > 1 km^{2} (0.386 sq mi or 247 acres) and river estuaries.

Steenbecque (French pronunciation: [stɛ̃bɛk]; Dutch: Steenbeke or Steenbeeke) is a commune in the Nord department in northern France.

== Etymology ==
Steenbecque has historically been attested as Steenbeka in 1183. The toponym Steenbecque is of Germanic origin, deriving from a Low German dialect, ultimately from Proto-West-Germanic *stain. Within the Nord and Pas-de-Calais departments, the Germanic hydronym *-bak(i) entered the French language via Low German, and took on two forms: the Germanic form -beek and Romance -becque (also -bec, -becques).

== Heraldry ==
Arms of Steenbecque	The arms of Steenbecque are blazoned : Azure, 3 escallops argent.

== See also ==
- Communes of the Nord department
