= Rubrouck =

- Commune
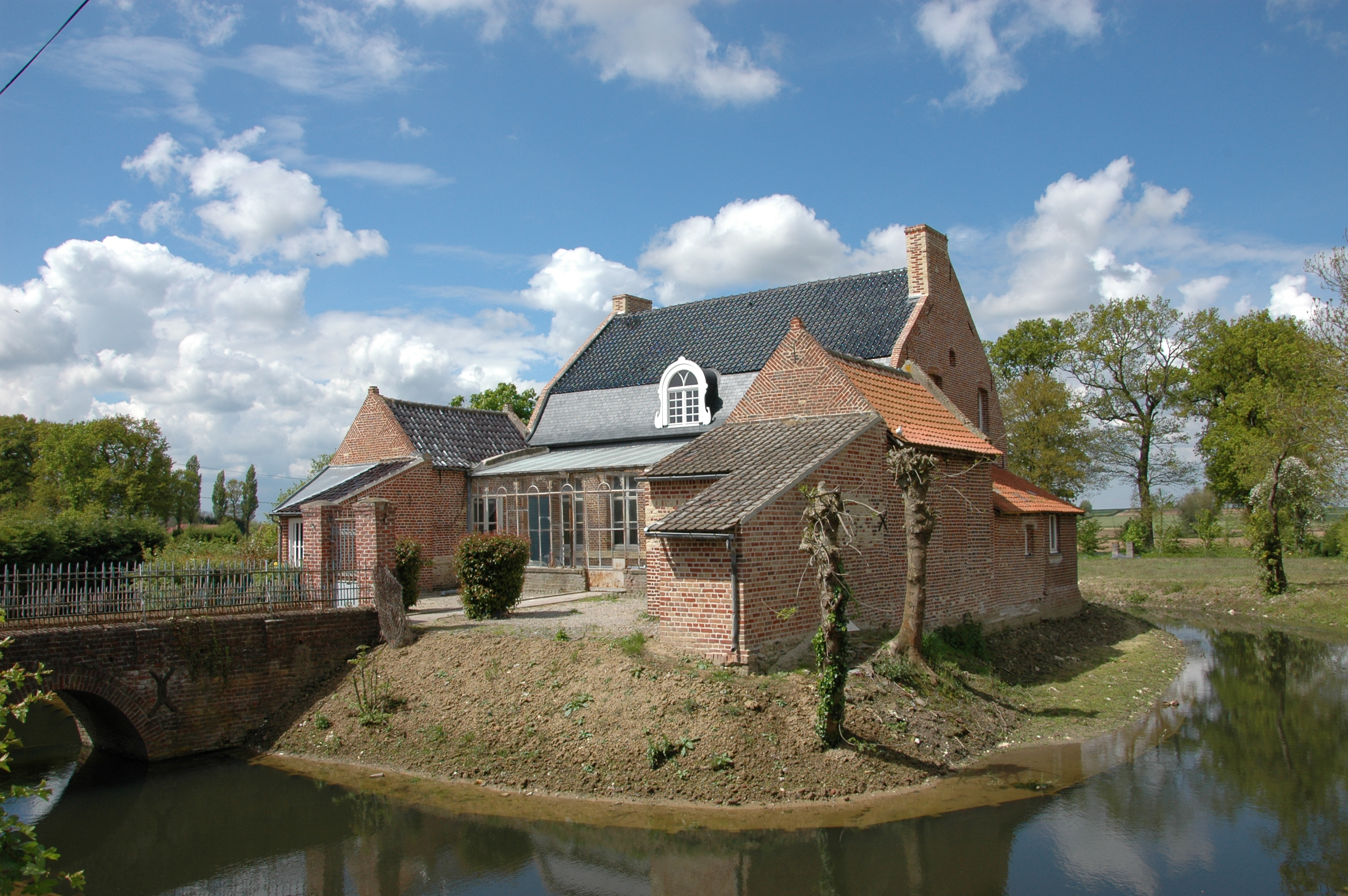
- The presbytery in Rubrouck

- Coat of arms
- Location of Rubrouck
- Location within France Location within Hauts-de-France
- Coordinates: 50°50′22″N 2°21′23″E
- Country: France
- Region: Hauts-de-France
- Department: Nord
- Arrondissement: Dunkerque
- Canton: Wormhout
- Intercommunality: CA Cœur de Flandre

Government
  - Mayor (2020–2026): Luc Everaere
- Area^{1}: 14.88 km^{2} (5.75 sq mi)
- Elevation: 33 m (108 ft)
- Highest elevation: 65 m (213 ft)
- Lowest elevation: 20 m (66 ft)
- Population (2023): 899
  - Density: 60.4/km^{2} (156/sq mi)
- Demonym: Rubrouckois
- Time zone: UTC+01:00 (CET)
  - Summer (DST): UTC+02:00 (CEST)
- INSEE/Postal code: 59516 /59285
- ^{1} French Land Register data, which excludes lakes, ponds, glaciers > 1 km^{2} (0.386 sq mi or 247 acres) and river estuaries.

Rubrouck (French pronunciation: [ʁybʁuk]; Dutch: Rubroek, once Ruysbroeck) is a commune in the Nord department in northern France.

== History ==
Rubrouck was first mentioned in 1104. It was the home of the 13th-century explorer William of Rubruck (fl.1248–1255).

== Heraldry ==
Arms of Rubrouck	The arms of Rubrouck are blazoned : Gules, a lion argent armed and langued Or. (Broxeele and Rubrouck use the same arms.)

== See also ==
- Communes of the Nord department
