= Saint-Sylvestre-Cappel =

- Commune
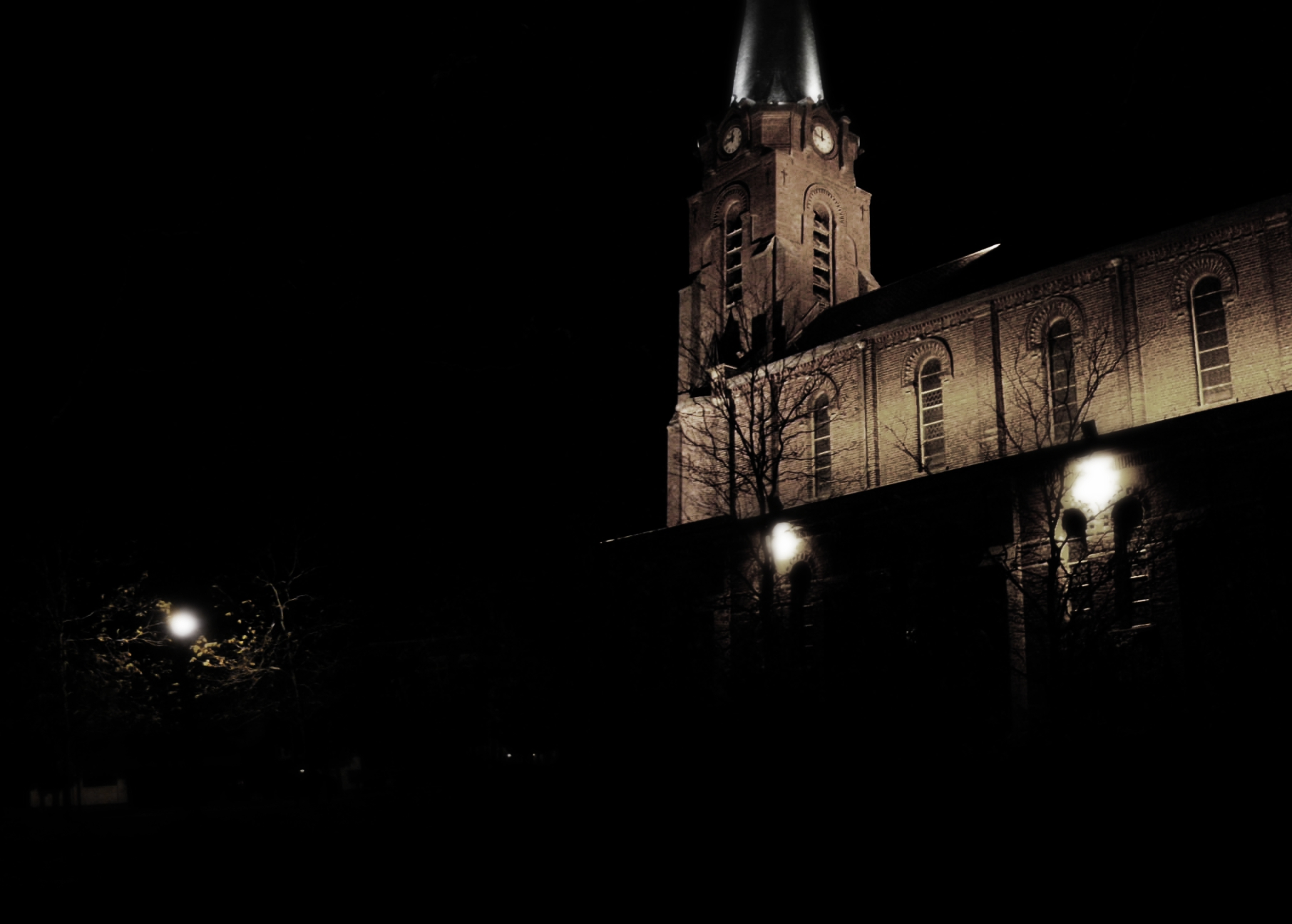
- The church in Saint-Sylvestre-Cappel

- Coat of arms
- Location of Saint-Sylvestre-Cappel
- Location within France Location within Hauts-de-France
- Coordinates: 50°46′37″N 2°33′14″E
- Country: France
- Region: Hauts-de-France
- Department: Nord
- Arrondissement: Dunkerque
- Canton: Bailleul
- Intercommunality: CA Cœur de Flandre

Government
  - Mayor (2023–2026): Claude Bodéle
- Area^{1}: 8.14 km^{2} (3.14 sq mi)
- Elevation: 30 m (98 ft)
- Highest elevation: 58 m (190 ft)
- Lowest elevation: 28 m (92 ft)
- Population (2023): 1,144
  - Density: 141/km^{2} (364/sq mi)
- Time zone: UTC+01:00 (CET)
  - Summer (DST): UTC+02:00 (CEST)
- INSEE/Postal code: 59546 /59114
- ^{1} French Land Register data, which excludes lakes, ponds, glaciers > 1 km^{2} (0.386 sq mi or 247 acres) and river estuaries.

Saint-Sylvestre-Cappel (French pronunciation: [sɛ̃ silvɛstʁ kapɛl]; Dutch Sint-Silvesterkappel) is a commune in the Nord department in northern France.

== Heraldry ==
Arms of Saint-Sylvestre-Cappel	The arms of Saint-Sylvestre-Cappel are blazoned : Or, 3 horns gules, banded argent.

== Demography ==
Historical population

Year	Pop.	±% p.a.
1793	1,110	—
1861	1,010	−0.14%
1911	896	−0.24%
1962	716	−0.44%
1968	724	+0.19%
1975	870	+2.66%
1982	1,045	+2.65%

Year	Pop.	±% p.a.
1990	1,019	−0.31%
1999	1,073	+0.58%
2007	1,085	+0.14%
2012	1,066	−0.35%
2017	1,180	+2.05%
2023	1,144	−0.52%

Source: EHESS and INSEE (1968-2023)

== See also ==
- Brasserie de Saint-Sylvestre
- Communes of the Nord department
