= Merville, Nord =

Merville Mergem
- Commune
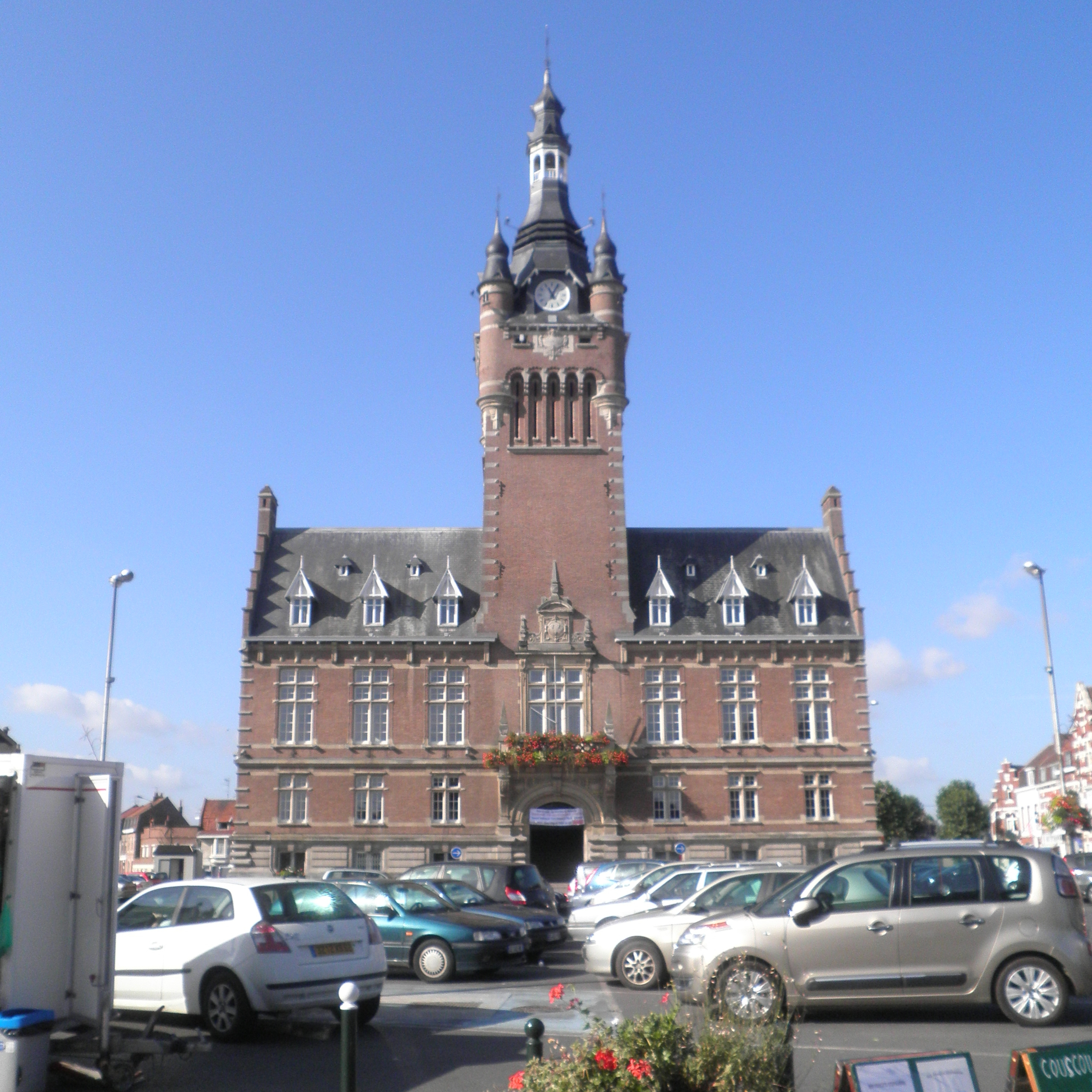
- Merville town hall

- Coat of arms
- Location of Merville
- Location within France Location within Hauts-de-France
- Coordinates: 50°38′40″N 2°38′28″E
- Country: France
- Region: Hauts-de-France
- Department: Nord
- Arrondissement: Dunkerque
- Canton: Hazebrouck
- Intercommunality: Flandre Lys

Government
  - Mayor (2020–2026): Joël Duyck
- Area^{1}: 26.96 km^{2} (10.41 sq mi)
- Elevation: 17 m (56 ft)
- Highest elevation: 19 m (62 ft)
- Lowest elevation: 12 m (39 ft)
- Population (2023): 9,808
  - Density: 363.8/km^{2} (942.2/sq mi)
- Time zone: UTC+01:00 (CET)
  - Summer (DST): UTC+02:00 (CEST)
- INSEE/Postal code: 59400 /59660
- ^{1} French Land Register data, which excludes lakes, ponds, glaciers > 1 km^{2} (0.386 sq mi or 247 acres) and river estuaries.

Merville (French pronunciation: [mɛʁvil]; West Flemish: Mergem) is a commune in the Nord department and Hauts-de-France region of northern France. The town lies 13 kilometres north of Béthune, and 30 kilometres west of Lille.

== History ==
=== Industry ===
Located at the convergence of a canal system and a canalised river, Merville supported an extensive boat-building industry, with many different shipyards and chandlers located in the town. The industry went into decline in the post-war era and is today virtually extinct.

=== First World War ===
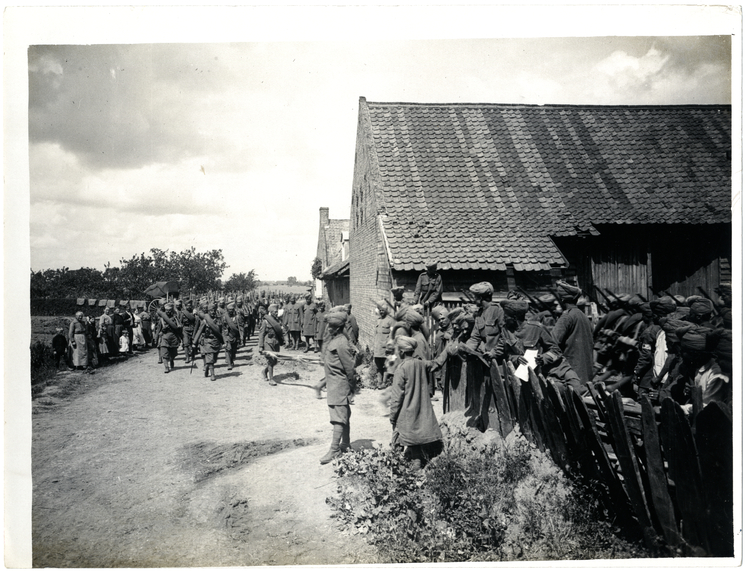
6th Jat Regiment marching into its billet, July 1915

During the course of the First World War the village was completely destroyed. The 6th Jat Light Infantry were billeted here in 1915. The Merville Communal Cemetery and Extension is also located here.

Country	Victims (Communal)	Victims (Extension)
(British Empire) United Kingdom	913	1139
(British Raj) British India	-	97
South Africa	2	21
Canada	3	11
Australia	2	-
Total	920	1268
Total	2188	

== Notable buildings ==
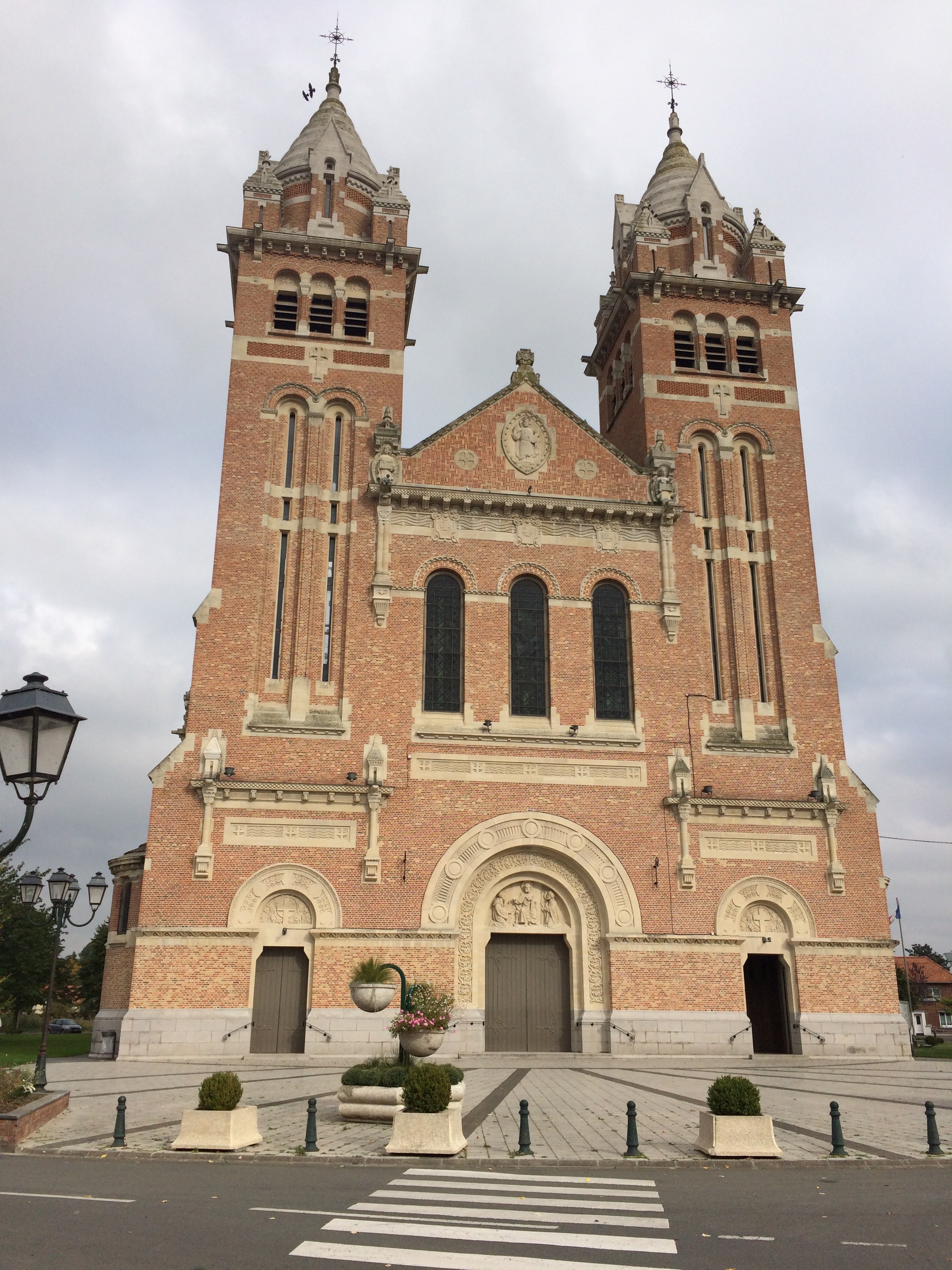
The parish church of St Peter in Merville, France.

The parish church of St Peter in Merville is a very large capacity parish church, whose dimensions make it a prominent landmark, visible at considerable distances from the town. Merville is a parish of the Roman Catholic Archdiocese of Lille.

The diocesan seminary of the Lille diocese was formerly located in Merville. It is also a very large structure, built on four storeys around a central cloister, with large chapel and refectory, and accommodation for over 200 staff and students. With decreasing numbers of vocations the seminary closed in 1970. The extensive buildings were briefly occupied by a community of religious sisters, and then became the Lille diocese's retreat and conference centre, a role in which it is still employed today.

The main town square is dominated by the town hall (Hôtel de Ville), which is built in the Flemish Renaissance style. It incorporates a very tall clock tower, with a working public clock.

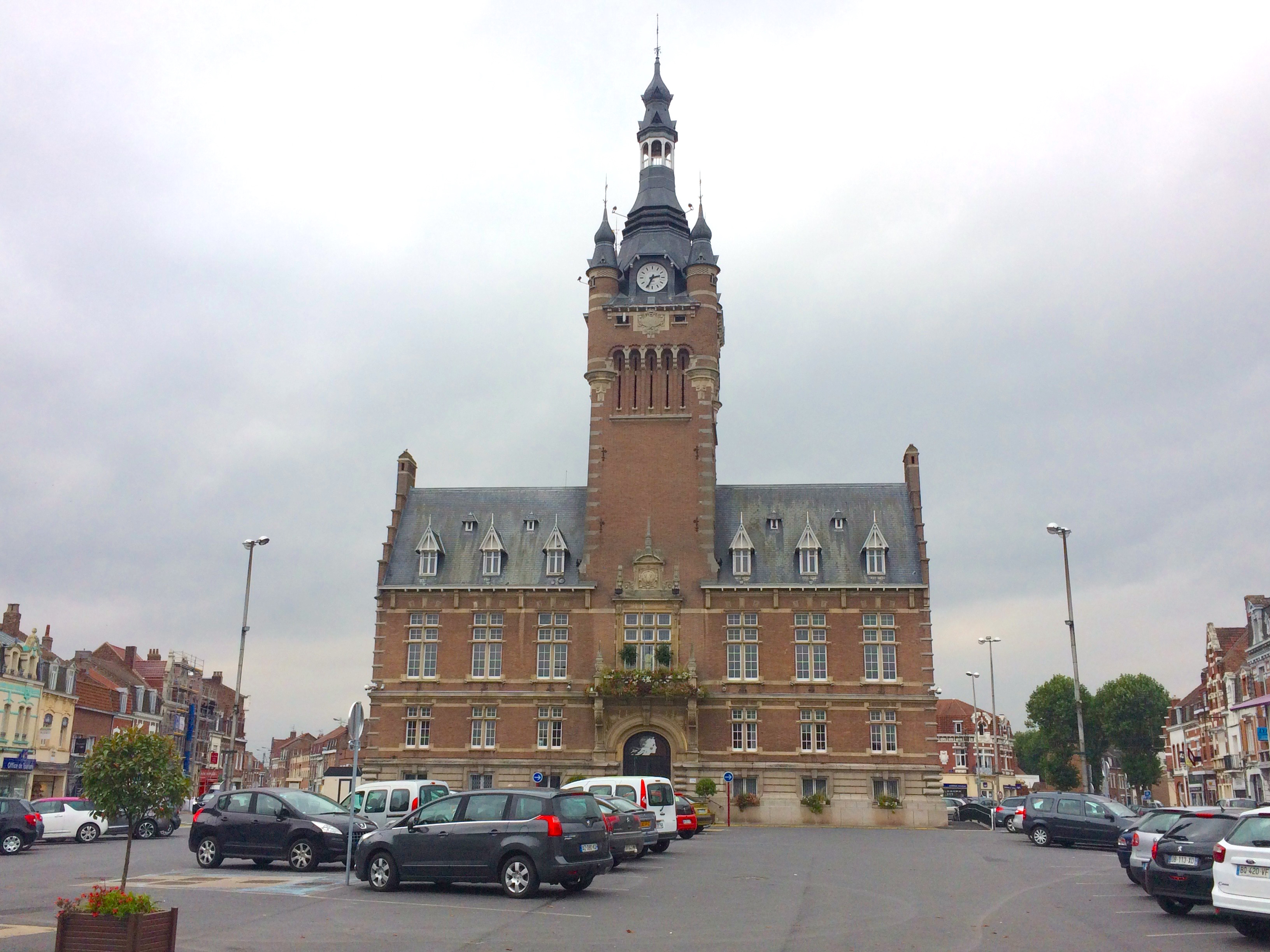
The town hall in Merville

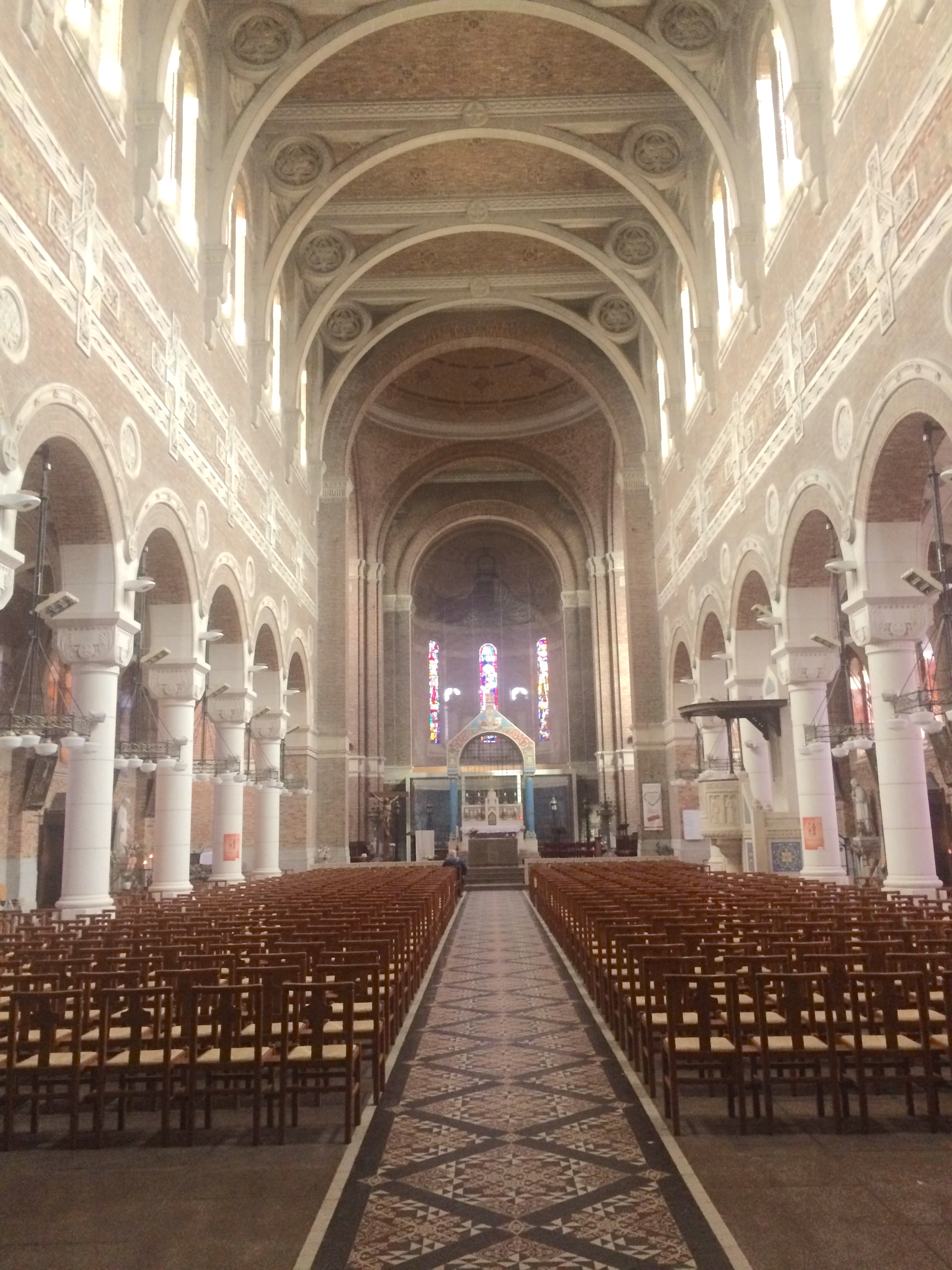
The parish church of St Peter in Merville

== Heraldry ==
Arms of Merville	The arms of Merville are blazoned : Per fess Or and azure, 3 fleurs de lys counterchanged. (Anhiers and Merville use the same arms.)

== Population ==
Historical population

Year	Pop.	±% p.a.
1946	7,376	—
1954	7,890	+0.85%
1962	8,289	+0.62%
1968	8,601	+0.62%
1975	8,658	+0.09%
1982	9,050	+0.63%

Year	Pop.	±% p.a.
1990	9,026	−0.03%
1999	8,903	−0.15%
2007	8,743	−0.23%
2012	9,465	+1.60%
2017	9,720	+0.53%
2023	9,808	+0.15%

Source: EHESS and INSEE (1968–2023)

== Climate ==
Climate in this area has mild differences between highs and lows, and there is adequate rainfall year-round. The Köppen climate classification subtype for this climate is "Cfb" (marine west coast/oceanic climate).

== Le Sart ==
Le Sart is a small village located about 2 km west of Merville. It forms part of the Merville commune, and is connected to the town by a regular bus service. It has a small parish church dedicated to Notre Dame des Affligés (Our Lady of the Afflicted).

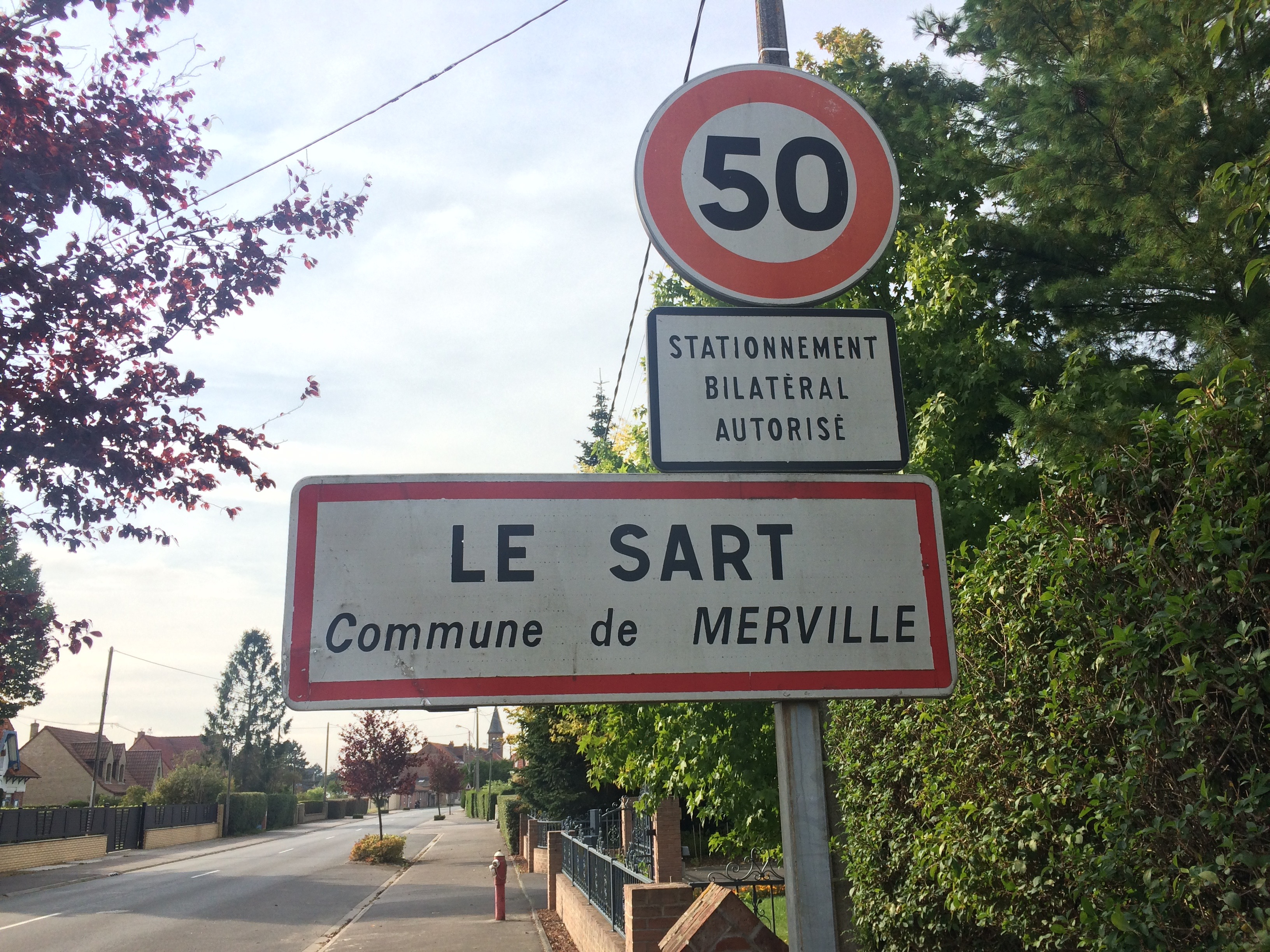
Village sign on the approach to Le Sart

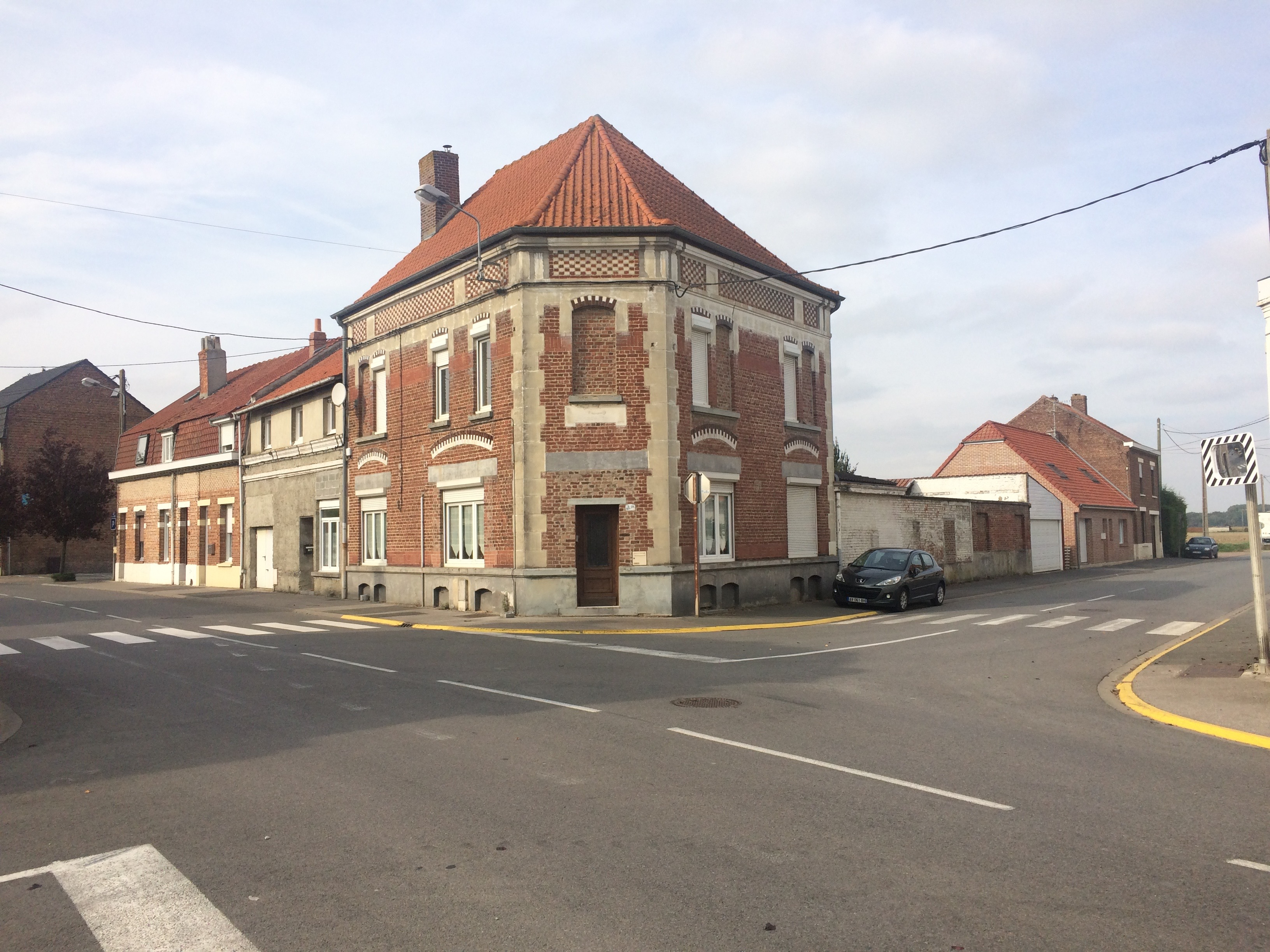
Le Sart: the village centre

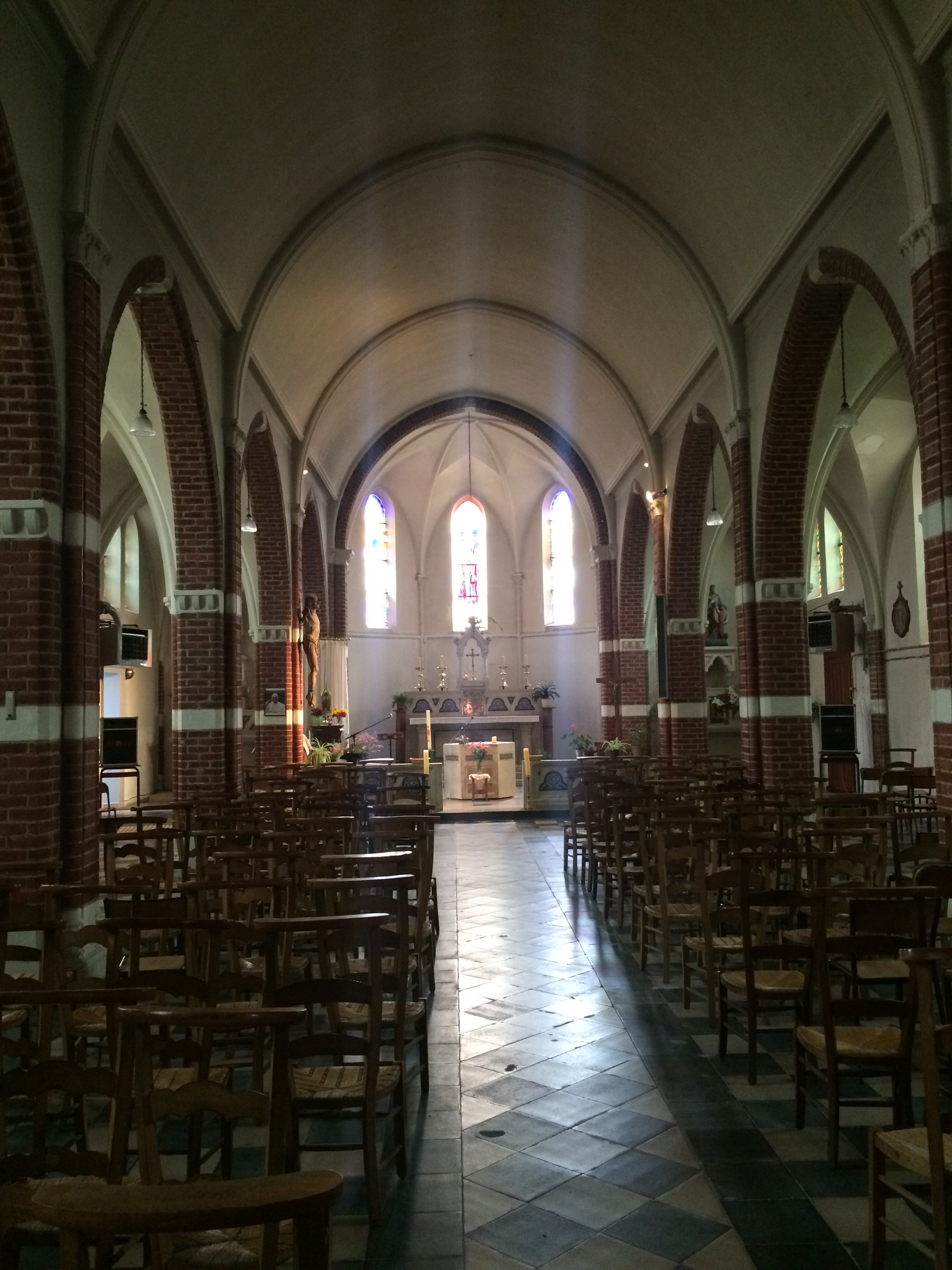
Le Sart: the parish church

== See also ==
- Communes of the Nord department
- Cuisine and specialties of Nord-Pas-de-Calais
