= Winnezeele =

Winnezeele Winnezele
- Commune
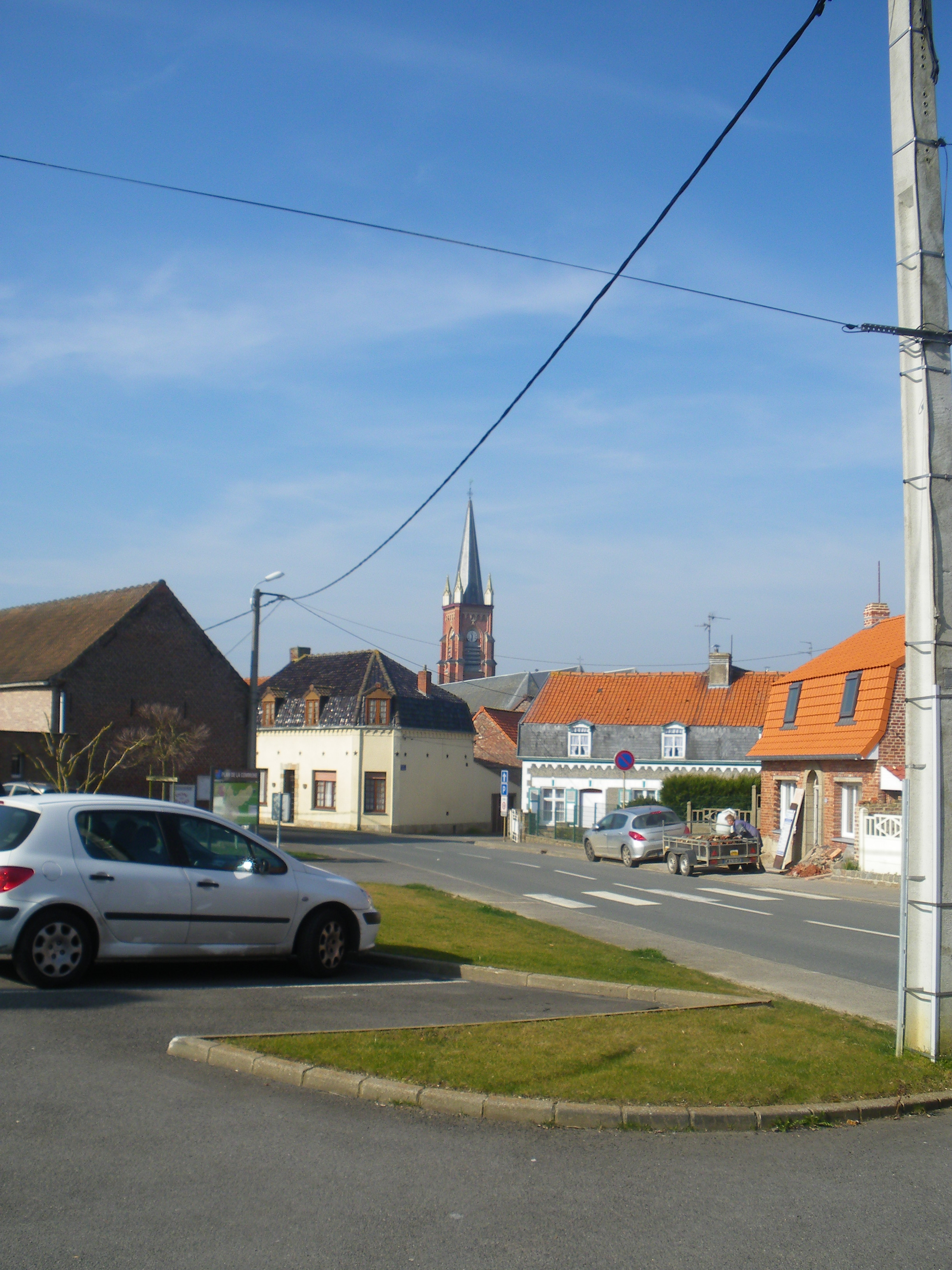
- A view within Winnezeele

- Coat of arms
- Location of Winnezeele
- Location within France Location within Hauts-de-France
- Coordinates: 50°50′30″N 2°33′06″E
- Country: France
- Region: Hauts-de-France
- Department: Nord
- Arrondissement: Dunkerque
- Canton: Wormhout
- Intercommunality: CA Cœur de Flandre

Government
  - Mayor (2020–2026): Anne Vanpeene
- Area^{1}: 15.54 km^{2} (6.00 sq mi)
- Elevation: 25 m (82 ft)
- Highest elevation: 41 m (135 ft)
- Lowest elevation: 5 m (16 ft)
- Population (2023): 1,261
  - Density: 81.15/km^{2} (210.2/sq mi)
- Time zone: UTC+01:00 (CET)
  - Summer (DST): UTC+02:00 (CEST)
- INSEE/Postal code: 59662 /59670
- ^{1} French Land Register data, which excludes lakes, ponds, glaciers > 1 km^{2} (0.386 sq mi or 247 acres) and river estuaries.

Winnezeele (French pronunciation: [winzɛl]; from Flemish; Winnezele in modern Dutch spelling) is a commune in the Nord department in northern France.

== Heraldry ==
Arms of Winnezeele	The arms of Winnezeele are blazoned : Argent, 4 lozenges gules, on a canton Or 2 fesses gules. (NB: one of the lozenges is covered by the canton).

== Population ==
Historical population
Year	Pop.	±% p.a.
1968	1,033	—
1975	988	−0.63%
1982	957	−0.45%
1990	998	+0.53%
1999	1,108	+1.17%
2007	1,228	+1.29%
2012	1,214	−0.23%
2017	1,306	+1.47%
2023	1,261	−0.58%
Source: INSEE

== See also ==
- Communes of the Nord department
