= Buysscheure =

Buysscheure Buisscheure
- Commune
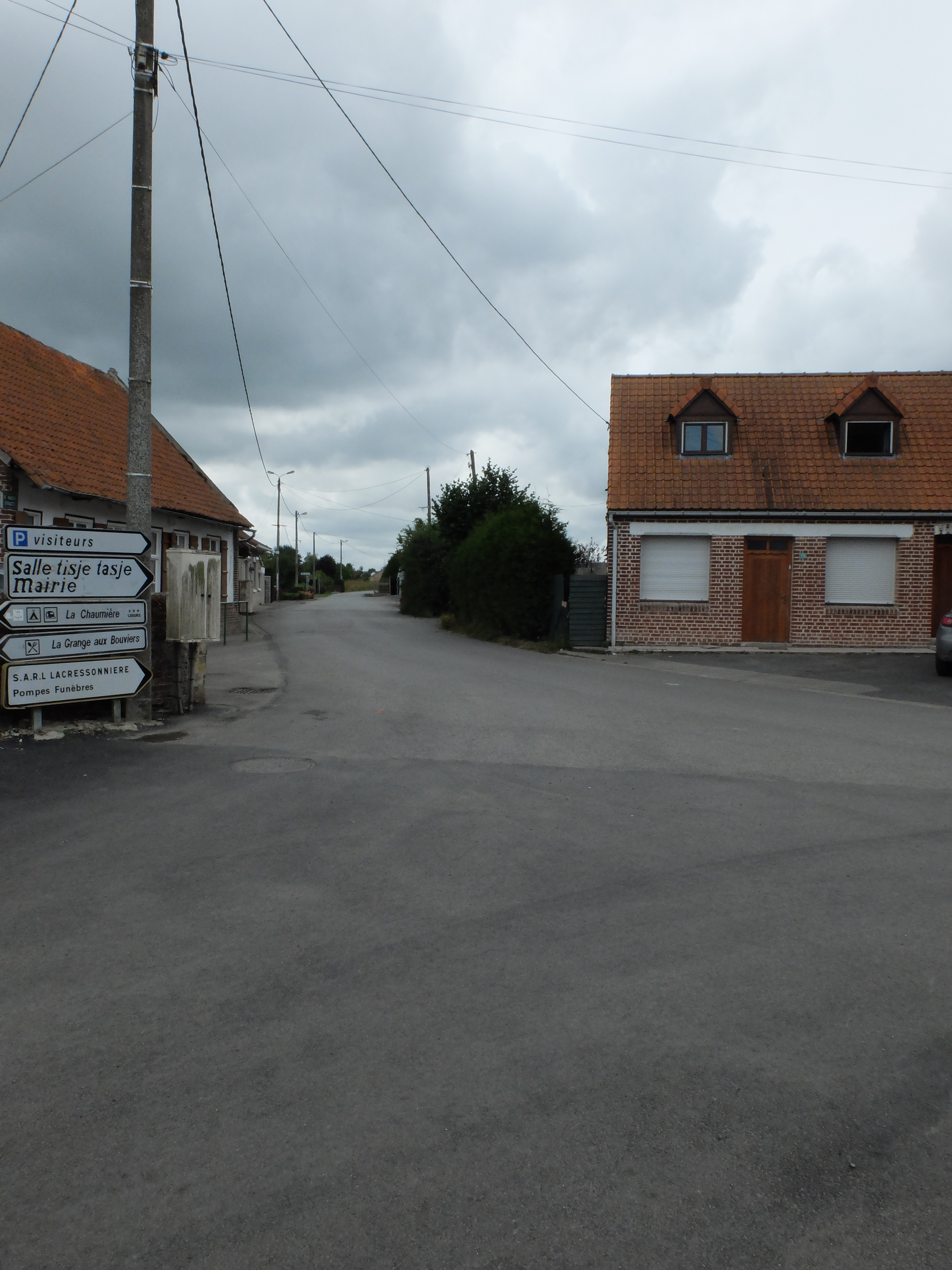
- A view within Buysscheure

- Coat of arms
- Location of Buysscheure
- Location within France Location within Hauts-de-France
- Coordinates: 50°48′14″N 2°19′53″E
- Country: France
- Region: Hauts-de-France
- Department: Nord
- Arrondissement: Dunkerque
- Canton: Wormhout
- Intercommunality: CA Cœur de Flandre

Government
  - Mayor (2020–2026): Marc Deheele
- Area^{1}: 6.15 km^{2} (2.37 sq mi)
- Elevation: 35 m (115 ft)
- Highest elevation: 50 m (160 ft)
- Lowest elevation: 2 m (6.6 ft)
- Population (2023): 582
  - Density: 94.6/km^{2} (245/sq mi)
- Time zone: UTC+01:00 (CET)
  - Summer (DST): UTC+02:00 (CEST)
- INSEE/Postal code: 59119 /59285
- ^{1} French Land Register data, which excludes lakes, ponds, glaciers > 1 km^{2} (0.386 sq mi or 247 acres) and river estuaries.

Buysscheure (French pronunciation: [bɥiskœʁ]; from Dutch, Buisscheure in modern Dutch spelling) is a commune in the Nord department in northern France.

The source of the river Yser is located here.

== Population ==
Historical population

Year	Pop.	±% p.a.
1793	764	—
1821	926	+0.69%
1846	851	−0.34%
1872	795	−0.26%
1901	700	−0.44%
1926	574	−0.79%
1946	515	−0.54%
1962	453	−0.80%
1968	407	−1.77%

Year	Pop.	±% p.a.
1975	376	−1.13%
1982	405	+1.07%
1990	419	+0.43%
1999	453	+0.87%
2007	505	+1.37%
2012	528	+0.89%
2017	583	+2.00%
2023	582	−0.03%

Source: EHESS and INSEE (1968-2023)

== Heraldry ==
Arms of Buysscheure	The arms of Buysscheure are blazoned : Gules, a chevron between 3 escallops, within a bordure Or.

== See also ==
- Communes of the Nord department
