= Staple, Nord =

Staple
- Commune
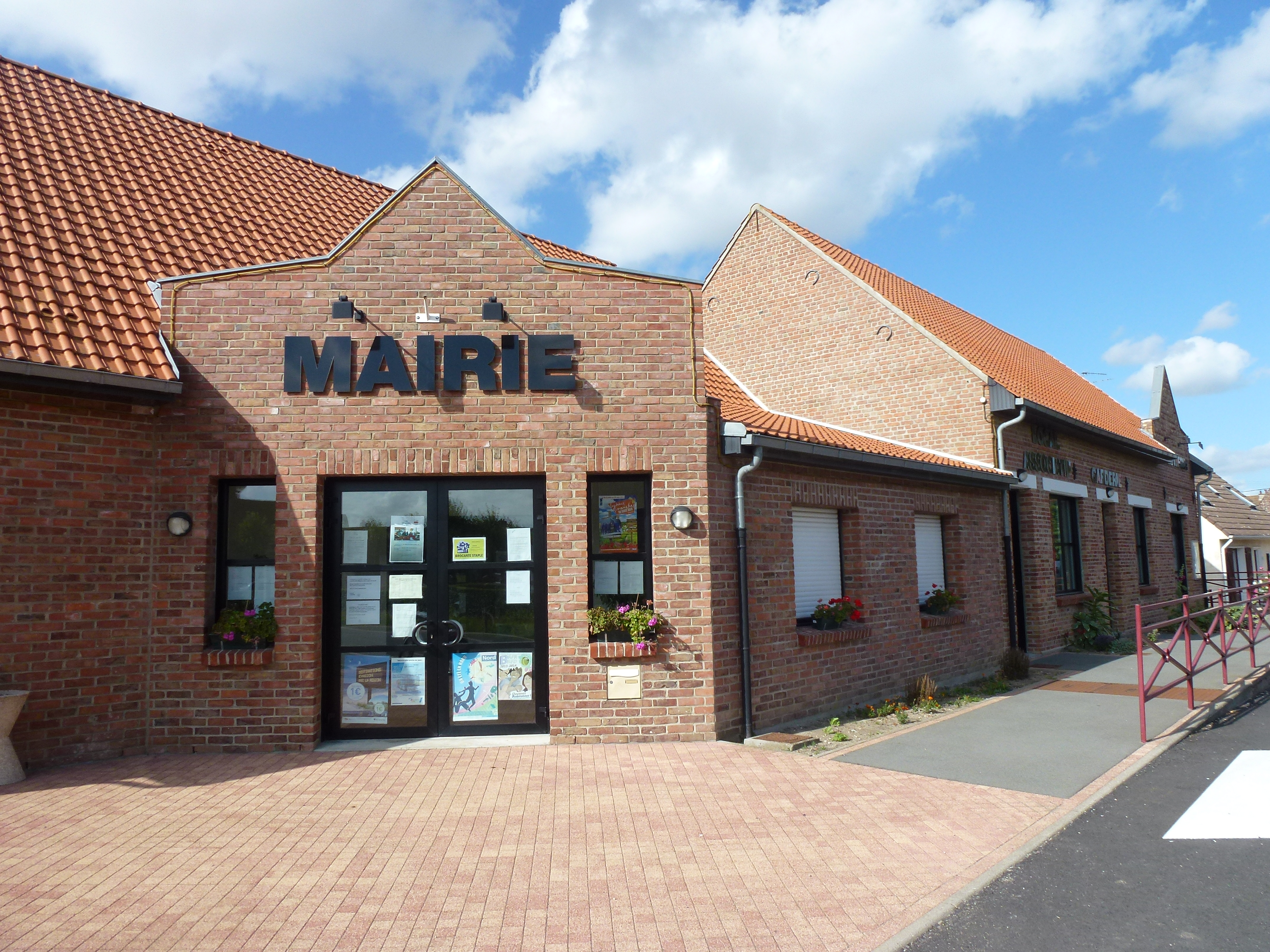
- The town hall in Staple

- Coat of arms
- Location of Staple
- Location within France Location within Hauts-de-France
- Coordinates: 50°44′55″N 2°27′12″E
- Country: France
- Region: Hauts-de-France
- Department: Nord
- Arrondissement: Dunkerque
- Canton: Bailleul
- Intercommunality: CA Cœur de Flandre

Government
  - Mayor (2020–2026): Eddie Defévère
- Area^{1}: 9.97 km^{2} (3.85 sq mi)
- Elevation: 42 m (138 ft)
- Highest elevation: 57 m (187 ft)
- Lowest elevation: 34 m (112 ft)
- Population (2023): 756
  - Density: 75.8/km^{2} (196/sq mi)
- Time zone: UTC+01:00 (CET)
  - Summer (DST): UTC+02:00 (CEST)
- INSEE/Postal code: 59577 /59190
- ^{1} French Land Register data, which excludes lakes, ponds, glaciers > 1 km^{2} (0.386 sq mi or 247 acres) and river estuaries.

Staple (French pronunciation: [stapl]) is a commune in the Nord department in the region of Hauts-de-France in northern France.

== Heraldry ==
Arms of Staple	The arms of Staple are blazoned : Ermine, a fess gules. (Sainte-Marie-Cappel and Staple use the same arms.)

== See also ==
- Communes of the Nord department
