= Phillip Davey =

Australian recipient of the Victoria Cross (1896–1953)

Phillip Davey VC MM
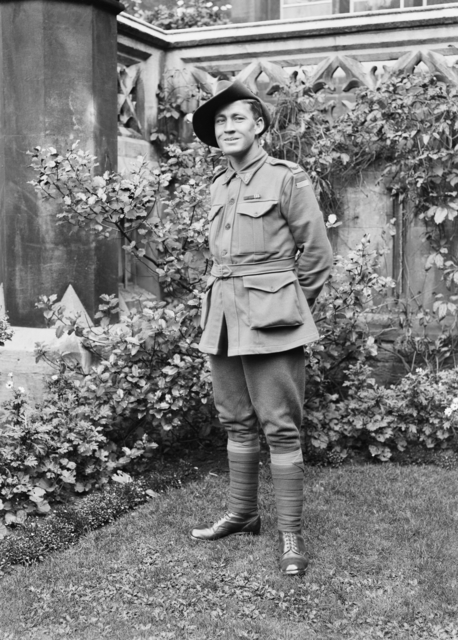
- Davey in September 1918
- Born: 10 October 1896; Unley, South Australia
- Died: 21 December 1953 (aged 57); Adelaide, South Australia
- Burial place: West Terrace AIF Cemetery, Adelaide
- Military career
- Allegiance: Australia
- Branch: Australian Imperial Force
- Service years: 1914–1919
- Rank: Corporal
- Units: 10th Battalion
- Conflicts: World War I; Gallipoli campaign; Landing at Anzac Cove; Western Front (WIA); Battle of Arras; Battle of Passchendaele (WIA); Battle of the Menin Road Ridge
- Awards: Victoria Cross; Military Medal

Phillip Davey, VC, MM (10 October 1896 – 21 December 1953) was an Australian recipient of the Victoria Cross (VC), the highest award for gallantry in battle that could be awarded to a member of the Australian armed forces at the time. Davey enlisted in the Australian Imperial Force in December 1914 for service in World War I, and joined his unit, the 10th Battalion, on the island of Lemnos on 10 April 1915. Along with his battalion, he landed at Anzac Cove, Gallipoli, on 25 April. He fought at Anzac until he was evacuated sick in early November, returning to Australia the following January.

Davey embarked for England in June 1916, and rejoined his battalion on the Western Front in October. In January 1918 he was awarded the Military Medal for bravery in rescuing a wounded man under fire. He was promoted to corporal in April. In the lead-up to the capture of Merris in June, he killed an eight-man German machine-gun crew, saving his platoon from annihilation, for which he was awarded the VC. During this action he was severely wounded. He returned to Australia to be discharged, and was employed by South Australian Railways over many years before dying in 1953, having suffered for years with bronchitis and emphysema. He was buried with full military honours in the AIF Cemetery, West Terrace. His medals are displayed in the Hall of Valour at the Australian War Memorial.

== Early life ==
Phillip Davey was born on 10 October 1896 at Unley, South Australia, to William George Davey, a carpenter, and his wife Elizabeth, née O'Neill; he was one of five sons of the couple who would see service in World War I. Phillip attended Flinders Street Model School and Goodwood Public School. After his schooling, he was involved in well boring and opal mining in Central Australia; at the outbreak of World War I he was a horse driver.

== World War I ==
On 22 December 1914, aged 18, Davey enlisted as a private in the Australian Imperial Force (AIF) and was posted to the 2nd reinforcements to the 10th Battalion. He sailed for Egypt from Melbourne on 2 February 1915. He joined the 3rd Brigade's 10th Battalion on board the SS Ionian in the port of Mudros on the island of Lemnos in the northeastern Aegean Sea on 10 April 1915. The 3rd Brigade had been chosen as the covering force for the landing at Anzac Cove, Gallipoli, on 25 April. The brigade embarked on the battleship HMS Prince of Wales and the destroyer HMS Foxhound, and after transferring to strings of rowing-boats initially towed by steam pinnaces, the battalion began rowing ashore at about 4:30 am.

Davey participated in the heavy fighting at the landing and subsequent trench warfare defending the beachhead. After several bouts of illness, he was evacuated to Egypt with enteric fever in early November. In January 1916 he was repatriated to Australia to recover his health. He re-embarked at Melbourne in June, arrived in the United Kingdom in August, and embarked for France the following month. While he had been recuperating, the infantry formations of the AIF had been withdrawn from Gallipoli to Egypt, then transferred to the Western Front in France and Belgium. Davey rejoined the 10th Battalion in early October.

From the time Davey returned, the 10th Battalion rotated through front-line, reserve, training and fatigue duties, mainly in the Somme river sector. In February 1917, it participated in an operation at Le Barque, southwest of Bapaume. On 15 March, Davey was accidentally wounded by a hand grenade while the battalion was in camp, but returned to duty less than a month later, during the Battle of Arras. He was promoted to lance corporal in early May, at which time the battalion was fighting in a support role at Bullecourt. In September, the battalion was committed to the Passchendale offensive, specifically at the Battle of Menin Road at Polygon Wood. The following month Davey was gassed while the 10th Battalion was relieving troops in the front-line near Westhoek Ridge; he returned to his unit in early November.

Through the winter of 1917/1918, the battalion rotated through various duties, in and out of the front-line. On 3 January 1918, Davey rescued a wounded soldier under heavy fire, and was awarded the Military Medal (MM) for bravery in the field. The recommendation read:

On the night of 3 January 1918, near Warneton, when on patrol one of our men was badly wounded by machine gun fire. On seeing this from a forward post, L/Cpl Davey crawled out through our wire to a distance of 60 yards and with another NCO brought in the wounded man. This was done under a bright moon and under heavy enemy machine gun fire. The work of this NCO was greatly admired by his officers and all who witnessed it.

Davey was promoted to corporal on 24 April 1918, and that night the 10th Battalion conducted an operation near Méteren. The following month he was detached to Tidworth in England as an instructor, but returned to his unit at his own request on 23 June. Five days later, he was with his battalion during a "peaceful penetration" operation near Merris. Over the previous 18 months, the 10th Battalion had developed raiding and patrolling skills that were critical in this type of more open warfare. The 10th's commanding officer, Lieutenant Colonel Maurice Wilder-Neligan, initially ordered a platoon to secure a position around a hedge. As this was successful, and another platoon achieved similar success, he then committed two companies to the operation, covered by a smoke screen and trench mortar fire. One platoon reached the hedge, and began to dig in, when a nearby machine gun opened fire, killing the platoon commander, causing other casualties and scattering the platoon. Davey then went forward alone twice, and using hand grenades, killed the crew and captured the machine gun. He then turned it on a German counter-attack, which was repelled.

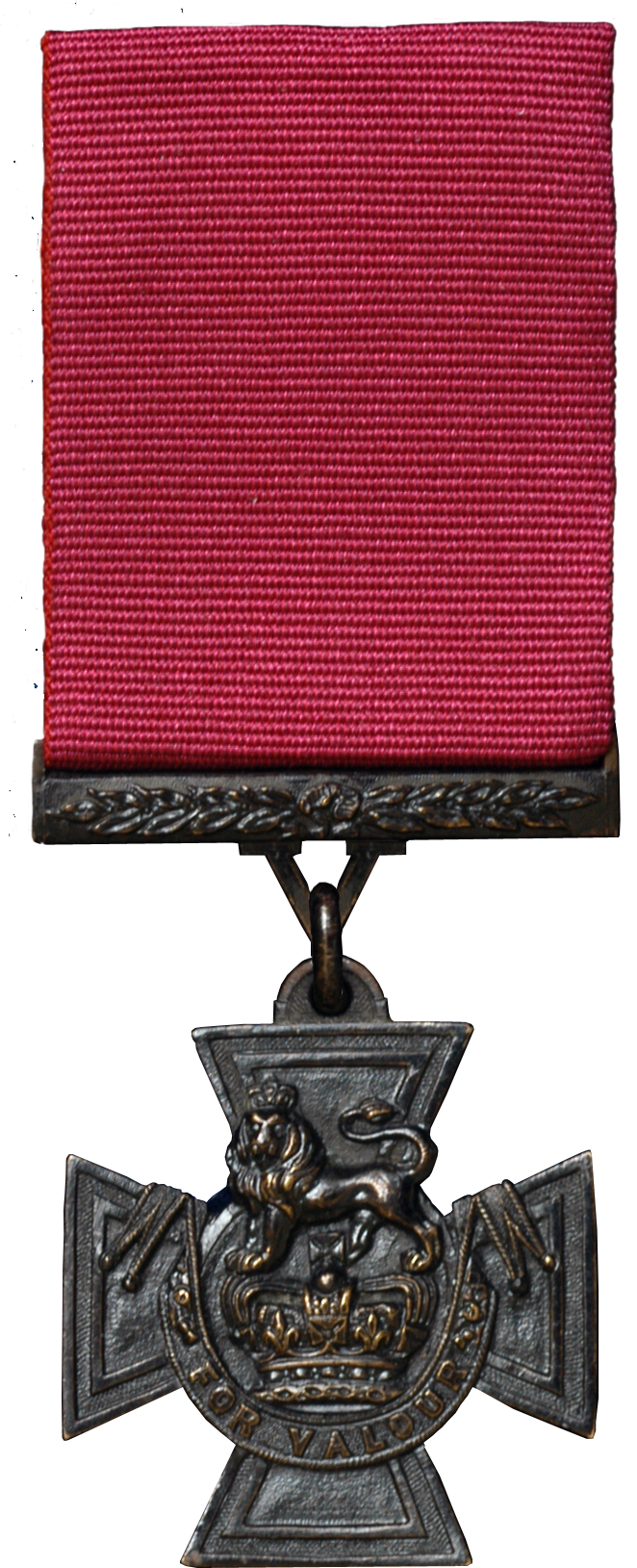
The Victoria Cross

Davey's actions in single-handedly eliminating a German machine gun post resulted in the award of the Victoria Cross (VC), the highest award for gallantry in battle that could be awarded to a member of the Australian armed forces at the time. He was initially recommended for the Distinguished Conduct Medal, but when the recommendation reached the commander of XV Corps, Lieutenant General Henry de Beauvoir De Lisle, he upgraded it to a recommendation for the VC and noted, "[a] most gallant and self-sacrificing action". The citation read:

For most conspicuous bravery and initiative in attack. In a daylight operation against the enemy position, his platoon advanced 200 yards, capturing part of the enemy line, and while the platoon was consolidating, the enemy pushed a machine gun forward under cover of a hedge and opened fire from close range, inflicting heavy casualties and hampering work. Alone, Corporal Davey moved forward in the face of a fierce point-blank fire, and attacked the gun with hand grenades, putting half of the crew out of action. Having used all the available grenades he returned to the original jumping-off trench, secured a further supply, and again attacked the gun, the crew of which had in the meantime been reinforced. He killed the crew, eight in all, and captured the gun. This very gallant NCO then mounted the gun in the new post, and used it in repelling a determined counterattack, during which he was severely wounded. By his determination, Corporal Davey saved the platoon from annihilation, and made it possible to consolidate and hold a position of vital importance to the success of the whole operation.

Davey's platoon was soon relieved by a reserve platoon that re-established the post. The 10th Battalion operation had seized 500 yards (460 m) of the German front line, along with thirty-five prisoners, six machine guns and two Minenwerfer trench mortars, for the loss of fifty casualties. Davey had sustained wounds to his back, abdomen and legs, and was evacuated to England. After he had recovered sufficiently he received his VC at Buckingham Palace on 12 September. On this occasion, Wilder-Neligan wrote a note to Davey which said:

I wish to offer my congratulations to you upon receiving the highest military honour which can be bestowed upon a soldier of Britain. Your career in the 10th has been marked throughout by keenness and efficiency to an unusually high degree. The especially fine work which secured the VC to you was only the culmination of a series of acts of coolness and bravery for which you have been noted in the past.

Davey then embarked to return to Australia in October, and was discharged from the AIF on 24 February 1919. A fellow VC recipient, Arthur Blackburn later said, "I think all agree that no VC was ever better earned than Phil Davey's". Four of Davey's brothers had also enlisted, Claude, Richard, Joseph and Arthur, with Joseph being aged 16 when he joined up. Joseph was wounded at Pozières and was promoted to lance corporal before his real age was discovered and he was sent home. Phillip's brothers Claude and Richard were also awarded the MM during World War I, Claude being killed in action in 1917.

== Later life ==
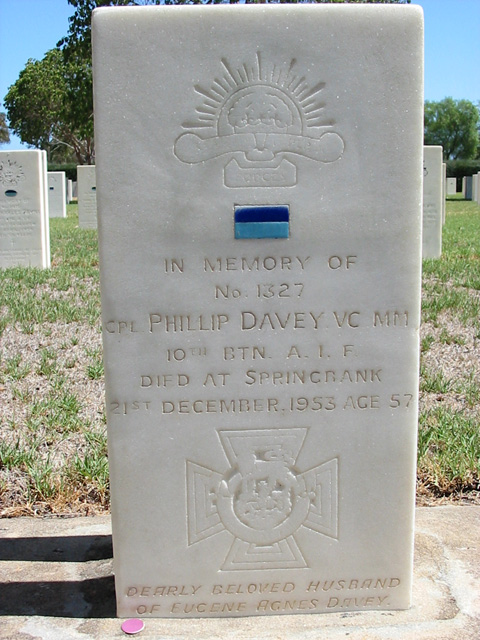
Davey's gravestone in the West Terrace AIF Cemetery, Adelaide

After returning from the war, Davey worked for South Australian Railways as a labourer and linesman over three periods between 1926 and 1946: 27 April 1926 to 4 October 1938; 6 March 1939 to 12 February 1942; and 17 December 1943 to 22 February 1946. He married Eugene Agnes Tomlinson on 25 August 1928; they had no children. After suffering for many years with bronchitis and emphysema, Davey died on 21 December 1953 of a coronary occlusion. He was buried at the West Terrace AIF Cemetery, Adelaide, with full military honours.

As well as the VC, MM, 1914–15 Star, British War Medal and Victory Medal for his service in World War I, Davey was later awarded the King George VI Coronation Medal and Queen Elizabeth II Coronation Medal. His medal set, including his VC, was presented to the Australian War Memorial in Canberra in 1967, and is displayed in the Hall of Valour.
