= Bill McCann =

20th-century Australian soldier of World War I

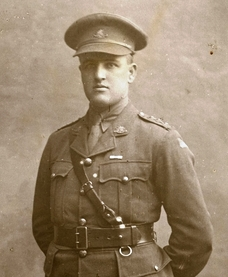
- McCann as a captain in 1917–1918
- Born: William Francis James McCann; 19 April 1892; Glanville, South Australia
- Died: 14 December 1957 (aged 65); Tusmore, South Australia
- Burial place: North Road Cemetery
- Military career
- Allegiance: Australia
- Branch: Australian Army
- Service years: 1914–1919; 1927–1935
- Rank: Lieutenant Colonel
- Nickname: Bill
- Service number: 405
- Commands: 10th Battalion (1919); 43rd Battalion (1927–1930)
- Conflicts: World War I; Gallipoli Campaign; Western Front; Battle of Pozières; Battle of Arras; Battle of Passchendaele; Battle of Amiens
- Awards: Companion of the Order of St Michael and St George; Distinguished Service Order; Officer of the Order of the British Empire; Military Cross & Bar; Mentioned in Despatches

Lieutenant Colonel William Francis James McCann, CMG, DSO, OBE, MC & Bar, JP (19 April 1892 – 14 December 1957) was an Australian soldier of World War I, a barrister, and a prominent figure in the military and ex-service community of South Australia during the interwar period. Born and raised in Adelaide, he worked as a teacher before the war. He enlisted in the Australian Imperial Force as a private in 1914, and rose through the ranks to be commissioned during the Gallipoli campaign of 1915. In 1916–1918 he fought on the Western Front in France and Belgium, was wounded twice, and rose to the rank of major. For his gallantry during the war, he was made a Companion of the Distinguished Service Order and twice awarded the Military Cross. After the war, he served as commanding officer of the 10th Battalion until its disbandment in 1919.

Returning home, McCann became a barrister and formed a legal partnership with Victoria Cross recipient Arthur Blackburn. McCann was active in returned servicemen's organisations, as president of the South Australian branch of the Returned Sailors' and Soldiers' Imperial League from 1924 to 1931, and as a state vice-president from 1938 to 1949. He was a foundation member of the Legacy Club of Adelaide, looking after the dependents of deceased servicemen. His service in the part-time Citizen Military Forces saw him reach the rank of lieutenant colonel and command the 43rd Battalion between 1927 and 1930. Appointed as state prices commissioner and deputy Commonwealth prices commissioner from 1938 to 1954; in 1946 an arson attack on his home was linked to his anti–black marketeering work in those roles. In recognition of his work with the ex-service community, McCann was appointed an Officer of the Order of the British Empire in 1935, and a Companion of the Order of St Michael and St George in 1956.

== Early life ==
William Francis James McCann was born at Glanville, outside Adelaide, South Australia, on 19 April 1892, to South Australian Railways engine driver John Francis McCann and his wife Eliza, née Francis. He attended various primary schools then Adelaide High School, and completed teacher training with the state Education Department in December 1913. He taught in Ethelton, Malvern and Glanville prior to the outbreak of World War I. His pre-war military experience consisted of four years in the volunteer cadets while he was at school and participating in the University of Adelaide Rifle Club during his teacher training.

== World War I ==
=== Gallipoli campaign ===
McCann enlisted in the Australian Imperial Force (AIF) on 24 August 1914 at Morphettville, South Australia. He was allotted to the South Australian-raised 10th Battalion, part of the 3rd Brigade, as a private with the regimental number 405. Within a week he had been promoted to sergeant. The battalion embarked for overseas in October, and sailed via Albany, Western Australia, to Egypt, arriving in early December. While the force was training in Egypt, McCann was appointed as a platoon sergeant in the battalion's D Company. After completing training, the 3rd Brigade was designated as the covering force for the landing at Anzac Cove, Gallipoli, on 25 April 1915, and so was the first brigade ashore about 4:30 am. Four days later McCann was appointed as company sergeant major. During that period, the 10th Battalion suffered casualties of 13 officers and 453 men from the 29 officers and 921 men who landed. On 19 May the battalion helped repel a concerted Turkish counter-attack against the landing force, after which it settled into a routine of rotating through various positions in the line. His outstanding service during the period 6 May to 28 June gained McCann several mentions in Australian and New Zealand Army Corps routine orders. In July, McCann and most of the battalion had a three-day rest on the island of Imbros, but were quickly back in the trenches at Anzac. McCann was commissioned a second lieutenant on 4 August, by which time nearly half of the battalion had been evacuated sick with dysentery. He was promoted to lieutenant on 14 November. McCann remained at Anzac, serving as battalion intelligence and signalling officer until the unit was withdrawn to the island of Lemnos in late November, followed by evacuation to Egypt the following month.

=== Western Front ===
When the bulk of the AIF was transferred to the Western Front, McCann shipped to France in late March 1916 as the scouting, sniping and intelligence officer of his battalion. After disembarking in Marseille, he commanded a composite guard of honour drawn from the 9th and 10th Battalions. On 16 April 1916, he was promoted to captain and was appointed as second-in-command of A Company. During the Battle of Pozières on 23 July, he commanded the lead company of the battalion when it entered a bomb (hand grenade) fight over the O. G. 1 trench system in support of the 9th Battalion. (Note: The O. G. (Old German) trench system consisted of two lines of German trenches that were objectives of the Australian assault.) The Australian Official War Historian, Charles Bean, described his actions as follows:

McCann, recognising that the enemy post must be seized, lined out in front of it in shell holes, the ten or twelve men who were with him. With bombs they thoroughly subdued the German bombers, and smashed one machine gun – McCann's success in this bold movement being partly due to his having with him two old Gallipoli sergeants, G.D. Beames and L.C. Wickham. When bombs began to run out, McCann passed the word on to charge with the bayonet, and he was on the point of giving the word when he was hit in the head by a machine gun bullet.

According to McCann, his party was forced back due to the lack of grenades and the failure of other groups to keep in touch with his party. The citation for his Military Cross, awarded for his actions at Pozières, read; "For conspicuous gallantry in action. He led his company in the attack, bombing the enemy back, and, in spite of heavy casualties, pressed forward until severely wounded by a bomb." (Note: None of the cited sources explain the discrepancy about what caused his head wound.)

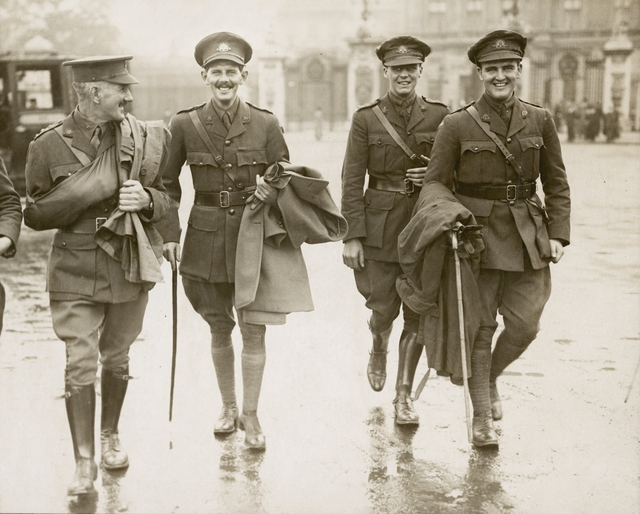
McCann (right) and Blackburn (second from left) after receiving their awards at Buckingham Palace

McCann was the first member of the 10th Battalion to be awarded the Military Cross, and was also the first unit officer to receive an award in the field for any specific action. The wound to his head had severely fractured his skull, but he remained at his post until he had reported the situation to the commanding officer of the 9th Battalion. He was evacuated to hospital in England, and his award was reported in the Adelaide Advertiser newspaper on 29 September along with a photograph and brief details of his service. After he had recovered sufficiently, he attended an investiture at Buckingham Palace on 4 October to receive his Military Cross from King George V. The same day, a fellow 10th Battalion officer, Arthur Blackburn, received his Victoria Cross for his own actions at Pozières that closely followed those of McCann. McCann was medically classified to be repatriated to Australia on a hospital ship, but ignored these orders and returned to his battalion in France in November. On arrival, he was placed in command of B Company. Suffering from illness, he was evacuated in February 1917, and after recovering was sent to a training school for a month. He rejoined the battalion in March.

On the night of 8 April 1917, as the Battle of Arras began, the 10th Battalion attacked Louverval Wood, an outpost of the Hindenburg Line of German defences. McCann was wounded in the neck during the attack, and after having it bandaged and being scarcely able to speak, remained with his troops for several hours, and according to the Australian Dictionary of Biography, "was an inspiration to his men". Once the situation was clear, he reported for medical attention and was evacuated to hospital in England. After six weeks recuperating, McCann rejoined his unit at the end of May, assuming command of A Company. He remained with the battalion throughout the Battle of Passchendaele in Flanders from July to November 1917, including the Battle of the Menin Road Ridge in September, before being seconded to a training battalion in the United Kingdom in late December. He returned to his battalion in June 1918. On 29 June, after the battalion had captured a section of the German line using "peaceful penetration" tactics, McCann's company was in the newly won positions when the Germans counter-attacked and got between his advanced posts. He led his company signallers, messengers and reserve platoon forward into the gap. The Germans dropped their weapons, which included a machine gun, and ran.

During the 10th Battalion's capture of Merris in July, his company's successful severing of the German lines of communication resulted in the award of a bar to McCann's Military Cross. The citation read:

For conspicuous gallantry and fine leadership during an attack. He led one of the attacking companies with great dash, and helped very materially in the success of the operation. Wherever the situation was most critical he was to be found directing and encouraging his men, and his fine example inspired all under his command.

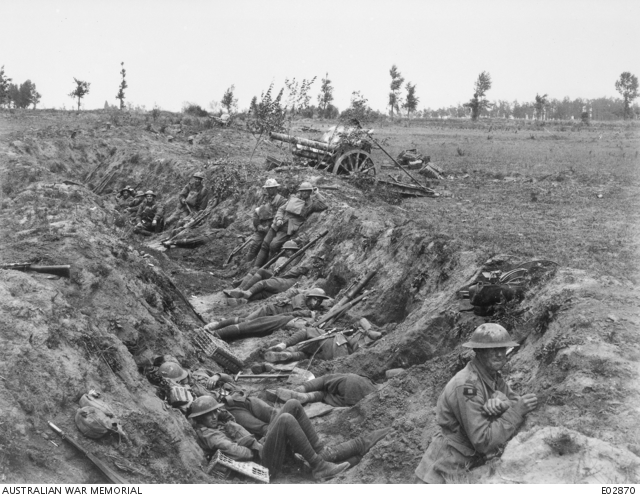
Troops of the 10th Battalion in a trench near Crépey Wood (in the background)

On 10 August, during early fighting in the Hundred Days Offensive, which began on 8 August 1918 with the Battle of Amiens, the 10th Battalion was tasked with providing support to an attack led by the 9th Battalion, which had suffered significant casualties as it attacked near Lihons. Unable to capture German positions in Crépey Wood, the 9th Battalion called on the 10th for assistance. As McCann commanded the strongest company of the 10th Battalion, he was sent forward. He led A Company in clearing the wood, his sub-unit sustaining only 15 casualties in the fighting, and capturing 10 badly wounded Germans. The 9th Battalion and McCann's company established posts in the wood. After a German barrage fell on the newly won positions, McCann was visiting his posts along the northern edge of the wood when he saw 200 to 300 Germans approaching to attack. This counter-attack overran one of the four A Company posts, and one isolated post withdrew. The German counter-attack also forced the withdrawal of the 9th Battalion from the eastern edge of the wood. The two remaining A Company posts continued fighting. One, manned by McCann, one other officer and seven men, fought the Germans for an hour. The Germans got into the post three times, and each time the Australians forced them out. McCann and his party eventually drove them off, killing 90 of the enemy. McCann's company suffered 30 casualties in the fighting, but their efforts allowed the 9th Battalion to re-establish its posts along the eastern edge of the wood. The next morning, McCann's company was subjected to a heavy gas bombardment in Crépey Wood, and he was allocated three tanks of the 5th Tank Brigade to clear the area north of his positions. Another German counter-attack developed, and the enemy got behind the Australian positions. McCann was reinforced; then, gathering troops from both his company and the 9th Battalion and moving forward by "vigorous action and hard, confused fighting", he and others closed the gap in the front line. For his actions at Crépey Wood, McCann was later made a Companion of the Distinguished Service Order, the second highest award for acts of gallantry by officers. The citation read:

For conspicuous gallantry and devotion to duty near Lihons on 10 August 1918. After the attack had failed at Crépey Wood, he successfully captured the position with his company in face of very heavy fire; and when the enemy in greatly superior numbers, counter-attacked, he held them off, personally killing many of the enemy and exposing himself freely until reinforcements enabled him to drive off the enemy and re-establish his original line. His courage and fine leadership prevented an important position falling into the hands of the enemy.

The 10th Battalion was back in action on 22–23 August as the Allied advance continued north of Proyart. The 10th Battalion was in a supporting role protecting the flank of the 1st Brigade. Learning of German positions in Luc Wood that were holding up the advance, the commanding officer, Lieutenant Colonel Maurice Wilder-Neligan, tasked McCann, commanding two companies, to clear the area. Along with flanking troops, McCann secured the wood, capturing 15 prisoners and four machine guns, allowing the advance to continue. McCann temporarily commanded the battalion for a week in late August before being promoted to temporary major on 23 September. The battalion saw its last action of the war later that month. McCann again temporarily commanded the battalion for a week in early October, and was substantively promoted to major on 21 October. Shortly after this he attended a strategy and tactics course at the Staff College, Camberley, before returning to the battalion in November, when he was appointed as unit second-in-command. In early January 1919, McCann was appointed commanding officer. He led the 10th Battalion until its disbandment in March, and was mentioned in Field Marshal Sir Douglas Haig's final despatch of 16 March 1919. Also in March, McCann led a party of American delegates on a tour of the war zone and, the following month, headed the 3rd Brigade contingent in the Anzac Day march through London. On 3 May he was invested with his Distinguished Service Order and the bar to his Military Cross at Buckingham Palace. Later that month he embarked for Australia, arriving in Adelaide in June. He was admitted to Keswick Repatriation General Hospital on his return, and was discharged from the AIF on 8 September 1919. Two of McCann's brothers also served in the AIF, and one was killed in action. McCann was issued with the 1914–15 Star, British War Medal, and Victory Medal for his service during the war.

== Interbellum and later life ==
McCann resigned from the Education Department in November 1919, having turned his hand to agriculture the previous month. He farmed at Truro and Manoora but was hampered by his war injuries, and abandoned these plans in August the following year. In accordance with normal procedures, while serving in the AIF he had been appointed an honorary major in the peacetime army, the Citizen Military Forces (CMF). He was substantively promoted to major in the CMF on 1 October 1920, on the Reserve of Officers List. (Note: The Reserve of Officers List was part of the reserve element of the CMF.) McCann began studying as an articled clerk in December 1920. He married Mildred Southcott on 20 August 1921; they had two sons and a daughter. In 1921 he began an active association with the South Australian branch of the Returned Sailors' and Soldiers' Imperial League of Australia (RSSILA), initially as a state vice-president. In this capacity he was also a member of the Soldier's Children's Education Board.

In March 1922, McCann began studying law at the University of Adelaide. He was elected president of the state branch of the RSSILA in 1924. McCann was an early advocate for the building of the National War Memorial in Adelaide, defended the status of Anzac Day as a public holiday against protests from the retail sector due to reduced shopping hours, and represented the interests of soldier settlers. He was admitted to the Bar on 25 July 1925, and went into partnership with Arthur Blackburn, forming the law firm Blackburn and McCann. On 19 May 1927, he transferred from the Reserve of Officers List to the part-time 10th Battalion, and on 1 July was transferred to the part-time 43rd Battalion as its commanding officer, gaining promotion to lieutenant colonel on 1 December. In 1928, McCann was a foundation member of the Legacy Club of Adelaide, established to assist the dependents of deceased ex-servicemen. When the National War Memorial design was being finalised, McCann strongly supported including the names of all South Australians who were killed in World War I; his suggestion was incorporated in the design. At the 1928 national conference of the RSSILA, McCann sharply criticised the defence policy of the Federal Government, particularly funding provided; "[d]efence has been brought down to such a low point", he said, "that it is now an absurdity."

McCann was an active member of the Big Brother Movement in South Australia; this involved supporting boys that had migrated to Australia from the United Kingdom under the Child Migrant scheme. He commanded the 43rd Battalion until July 1930 when he transferred to the Unattached List, (Note: The Unattached List was part of the Active Forces of the CMF.) and continued as president of the RSSILA until 1931, leading the RSSILA delegation to the biennial conference of the British Empire Service League in London in 1929. Returning from the conference and a tour of the former battlefields and war cemeteries, McCann contended that World War I had not been worthwhile, as tremendous loss had produced little gain, a stance that led to public criticism.

McCann took a leave of absence from the state presidency of the RSSILA to unsuccessfully run for the extremely marginal Division of Boothby as a Nationalist candidate in the 1929 federal election. His decision to run was criticised in some quarters as undermining the apolitical stance of the RSSILA. His campaign was supported by Senator Harold Elliott, a Victorian who had first met then-Sergeant McCann during the Gallipoli campaign and had been so impressed with him that he had offered McCann a commission in his battalion. McCann received 19,675 votes, comprising some 44.4 per cent of the tally, against the Australian Labor Party incumbent, John Price, who received 24,641 votes, or 55.6 per cent. McCann's defeat was part of a nationwide swing to the Labor Party that saw the Nationalist–Country coalition government lose office. He subsequently resigned as state president of the RSSILA, effective from before the election.

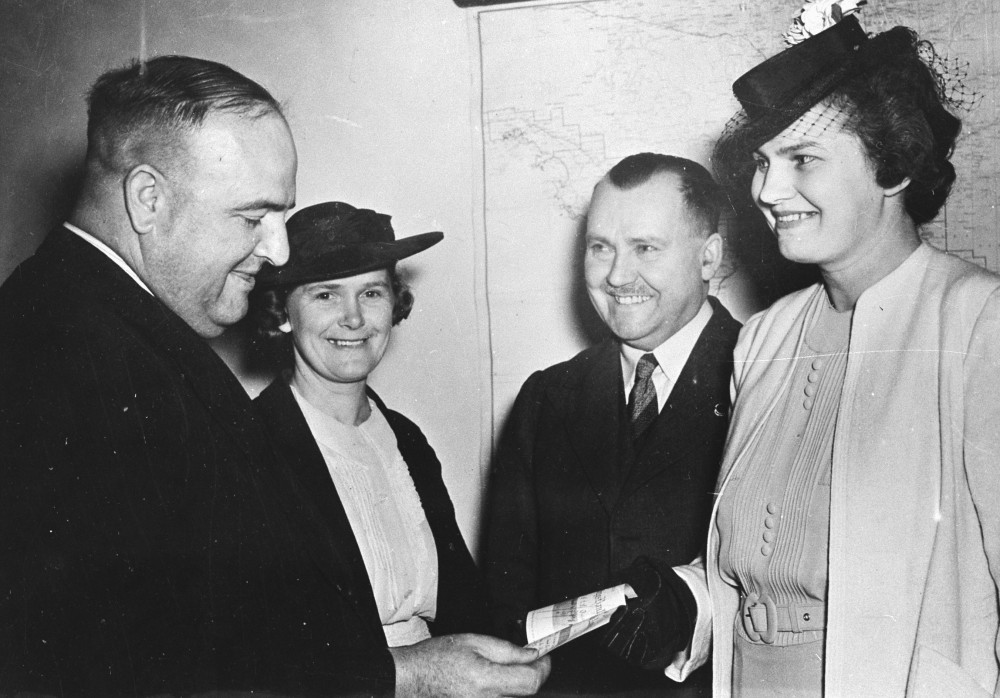
McCann (left) receiving a cheque for the Fighting Forces Comfort Fund in 1940

In 1930, McCann was nominated for the position of national president of the RSSILA, as part of a South Australian push for preference for returned servicemen in employment matters. In the event, the sitting president was re-nominated and narrowly re-elected with support from the state branches of Queensland, New South Wales and Tasmania, and a casting vote by the returning officer. In December 1930, McCann was again elected president of the state branch of the RSSILA, but retired from the post the following year. In 1934, McCann was appointed as the chair of the state government Industrial Board, which was responsible for government employees engaged in construction.

In early 1935, McCann was appointed to act in the place of Blackburn, who was now the city coroner, during the latter's absence on leave and other duties. The same year, McCann transferred back to the CMF officers' reserve, and was appointed an Officer of the Order of the British Empire (Civil Division) for services to returned soldiers and sailors. He also ran unsuccessfully for election as the president of the state branch of the RSSILA, became a justice of the peace, and was awarded the King George V Silver Jubilee Medal. In 1938, McCann successfully ran for election as a councillor in the City of Burnside, and was re-elected as a state vice-president of the RSSILA, continuing in this role until 1949.

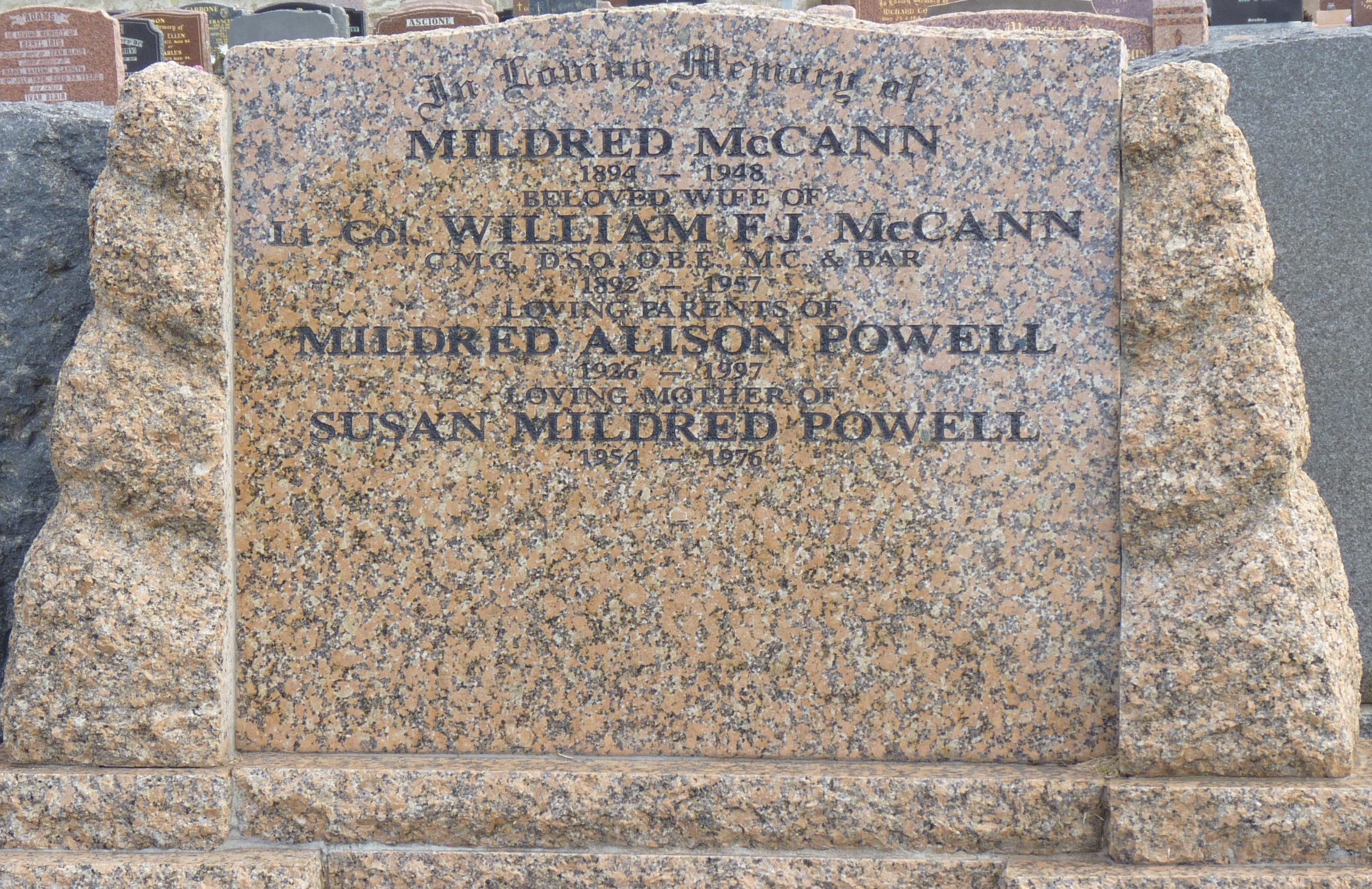
McCann's grave at North Road Cemetery

From 1938 to 1954 he was the state prices commissioner and deputy Commonwealth prices commissioner. Following the outbreak of World War II, McCann briefly commanded a special constabulary of men over 45 – known as the South Australian Emergency National Defence League – and was involved in raising the RSSILA Volunteer Defence Corps, the Australian equivalent of the British Home Guard. During the war, McCann was the chairman of the state Fighting Forces Comfort Fund, which sent parcels to troops serving overseas. In 1944, McCann was re-elected as a Burnside councillor, but resigned the following year. In 1946, his inquiries as prices commissioner into black marketeering resulted in his home being deliberately set alight. A man was subsequently convicted for the crime and sentenced to six years imprisonment with hard labour. The following year, McCann was elected the first president of the Tenth Battalion AIF Association, which combined the old 10th Battalion Club and the World War II 2/10th Battalion Club. His wife, Mildred, died in 1948. In 1956 he was appointed Companion of the Order of St Michael and St George for services to ex-servicemen. He died of coronary disease at Tusmore on 14 December 1957 and was buried at North Road Cemetery. The Australian Dictionary of Biography described him as "an able speaker and a keen debater with a pleasant and tenacious personality".
