= 10th Battalion (Australia) =

Australian Army infantry battalion

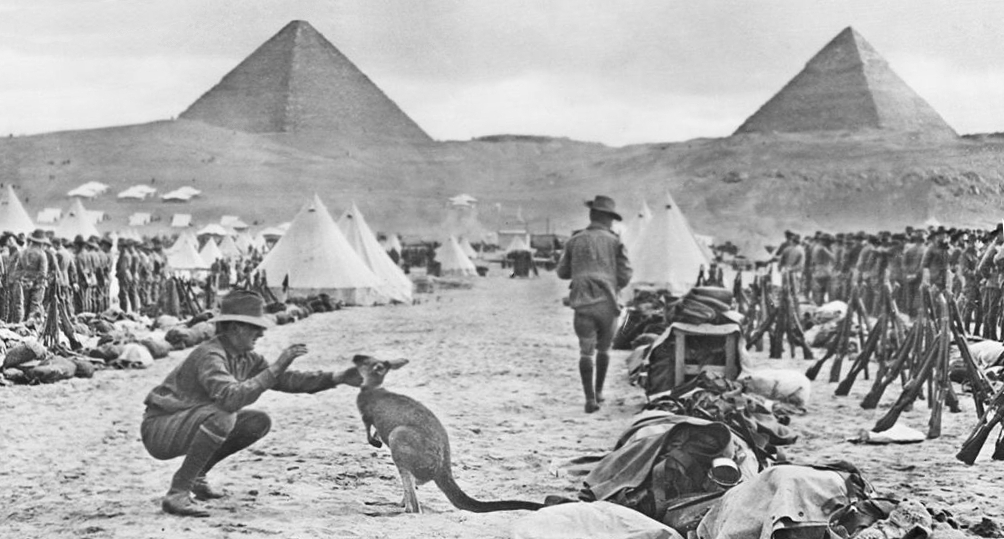
- Lines of the 9th and 10th Battalions at Mena Camp, Egypt, December 1914, looking towards the pyramids. The soldier in the foreground is playing with a kangaroo, the regimental mascot
- Active: 1914–1919; 1921–1930; 1936–1942; 1948–1960; 1965–1987
- Country: Australia
- Branch: Australian Army
- Type: Infantry
- Part of: 3rd Brigade, 1st Division
- Nickname: The Fighting 10th
- Motto: Pro Patria
- Colours: Purple over light blue
- Engagements: World War I: Gallipoli campaign; Western Front; World War II: Home front

Commanders
- Notable commanders: Stanley Price Weir; Maurice Wilder-Neligan

Insignia
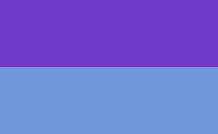
- Unit colour patch

The 10th Battalion was an infantry battalion of the Australian Army that served as part of the all-volunteer Australian Imperial Force during World War I. Among the first units raised in Australia during the war, the battalion was recruited from South Australia in August 1914 and formed part of the 3rd Brigade, 1st Division. After basic training, the battalion embarked for Egypt where further training was undertaken until the battalion was committed to the Gallipoli campaign. During the landing at Anzac Cove, it came ashore as part of the initial covering force. Members of the 10th Battalion penetrated the furthest inland of any Australian troops during the initial fighting, before the Allied advance inland was checked. After this, the battalion helped defend the beachhead against a heavy counter-attack in May, before joining the failed August Offensive. Casualties were heavy throughout the campaign and in November 1915, the surviving members were withdrawn from the peninsula. In early 1916, the battalion was reorganised in Egypt at which time it provided a cadre staff to the newly formed 50th Battalion. It was transferred to the Western Front in March 1916, and for the next two-and-a-half years took part in trench warfare in France and Belgium until the Armistice in 1918. The last detachment of men from the 10th Battalion returned to Australia in September 1919.

Following the war, the battalion was re-raised as a part-time unit based in South Australia, drawing personnel and lineage from a number of previously existing militia units. The unit served briefly during the inter-war years, before being merged with the 50th Battalion in 1930 as the size of Australia's part-time military forces was decreased following the conclusion of the compulsory service scheme. It was re-raised in its own right in the mid-1930s as the Australian military was reorganised as part of the country's war preparations. During World War II the 10th was mobilised for full-time service. Following Japan's entry into the war, the battalion was assigned to defend the New South Wales southern coast before being reassigned to the defence of Darwin and being amalgamated with the 48th Battalion in August 1942. In the post-war period, the 10th Battalion was re-raised in 1948 as part of the Citizens Military Force and throughout the 1950s served as a training unit for national servicemen. In 1960, it became part of the Royal South Australia Regiment (RSAR) and was reduced to several company-sized elements within that regiment's 1st Battalion, before being reformed as a full battalion within the RSAR in 1965. It remained on the Australian Army's order of battle until 1987, when it was amalgamated with the 27th Battalion to form the 10th/27th Battalion, Royal South Australia Regiment.

== History ==
=== World War I ===
The 10th Battalion was raised shortly after the outbreak of World War I as part of the Australian Imperial Force (AIF), an all-volunteer force established for overseas service. Recruited in South Australia, the battalion came into being on 17 August 1914 at the Morphettville Racecourse in Adelaide, drawing volunteers mainly from the local population as well as some from Broken Hill in outback New South Wales. (Note: The place of birth of the 10th Battalion's original members is recorded by Lock as follows: 615 in South Australia, 176 in other Australian states, 12 in New Zealand, 202 in various parts of the British Isles, 12 in various parts of the British Empire and 10 in "foreign" countries.) Volunteers included men who had previously served in the part-time forces before the war, (Note: Lock records that at least 180 of the battalion's original recruits were serving in the Australian Military Forces already prior to enlistment in the AIF, while others had also served previously in either the British or Australian forces.) coming from a variety of units including the 10th Australian Infantry Regiment, which had formerly been known as the "Adelaide Rifles". Commanded by Lieutenant Colonel Stanley Price Weir, after formation the battalion was attached to the 3rd Brigade, 1st Division, along with the 9th, 11th and 12th Battalions, and was one of the first units of the AIF raised for the war. With an establishment of 31 officers and 974 other ranks spread across eight companies, the battalion's personnel received a short period of individual basic training, culminating in the presentation of the regimental colours on 17 September and a march past the state Parliament House on 21 September. The following month, collective training at company and battalion level took place at Belair National Park and at Glenelg, South Australia. On 20 October, the battalion embarked on the ex-passenger liner, HMAT Ascanius, bound for the Middle East; it was the first South Australian infantry unit to leave Australia during the war.

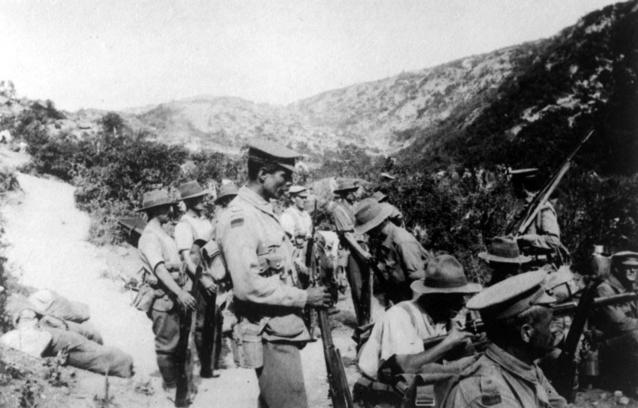
Troops from the 10th Battalion at Gallipoli, August 1915

After briefly stopping in Albany, where its convoy was delayed due to concerns over the presence of German warships en route, the 10th Battalion departed Australian waters in November and proceeded towards Egypt. Initially, the plan had been for the battalion to continue on the United Kingdom from where it would subsequently move to the Western Front. Poor conditions and overcrowding in training camps in the United Kingdom resulted in the decision to disembark the Australians in Alexandria instead. Arriving there on 4 December 1914, the battalion was sent into camp at Mena, near Cairo.

The 10th Battalion underwent desert training in January and February 1915, during which time it was reorganised around the four-company structure that had been adopted by the British. Designated 'A' to 'D', each company consisted of 228 men that were spread across four platoons. In late February, the 3rd Brigade received orders that it was being committed to an operation to seize the Dardanelles Strait near where it enters the Mediterranean Sea, to secure passage through to the Black Sea via the Aegean Sea and the Sea of Marmara in the wake of a failed naval operation to force the straits. After moving by rail to Alexandria, on 1 March the battalion boarded the Ionian, a Greek steamer. After reaching Lemnos, a shortage of fresh water on the island meant that the battalion was accommodated on the ship for the next seven weeks, although they spent their days ashore conducting exercises and mounting guard duty. Planning for a landing on the Gallipoli Peninsula began in early April; while this proceeded, on 15 April the battalion was issued its distinctive blue and purple unit colour patch.

==== Gallipoli campaign ====
On 24 April 1915, the 10th Battalion embarked for Gallipoli along with the rest of the 1st Division. Two companies and the battalion headquarters were allocated to the battleship HMS Prince of Wales, while the other two companies embarked on two destroyers, Scourge and Foxhound. At approximately 4:30 am on 25 April, the 10th Battalion was one of the first units to come ashore at Anzac Cove as part of the covering force – drawn from Colonel Ewen Sinclair-Maclagan's 3rd Brigade – for the main Anzac landing. Troops from the battalion landed near the centre of the cove and, ascending the Ariburnu Ridge, attempted to push inland towards the Sari Bair Range. According to the Australian War Memorial, scouts from the battalion are "believed to have penetrated further inland than any other Australians". Peter Stanley's 2014 book, Lost Boys of Anzac, substantiates and elaborates on this claim. Amid the chaos of the landing, they quickly found themselves isolated and had to withdraw back to the main concentration of Australian troops around the 400 Plateau. Following the initial landing, the battalion was in action for the next four days, holding the line until relieved by a battalion of Royal Marines. The rest was brief, as the 10th were recommitted to the fighting on 1 May. Casualties in the first weeks of the campaign were heavy, with the battalion losing 397 men killed or wounded between 25 April and 9 May. The advance stalled as Turkish resistance grew, and the Turks launched a heavy counter-attack on 19 May. By this time, the 3rd Brigade was located around Bolton's Ridge, with the brigade's four battalions occupying the line abreast; the 10th Battalion occupying a position south of Lone Pine, overlooking a wheat field through which the Turkish attack came. Caught in deadly crossfire, the attack was turned back with heavy losses. Following this, as both sides dug in, the campaign ground to a stalemate, and the battalion undertook mainly defensive duties along the perimeter around Anzac Cove. On 8 July, the remnants of the battalion, which now consisted of just over 500 personnel, was withdrawn to Imbros Island for a brief rest period out of the line, before returning to Anzac Cove on 11 July; after this, the 10th Battalion relieved the 11th, occupying a position around Silt Spur, opposite Lone Pine.

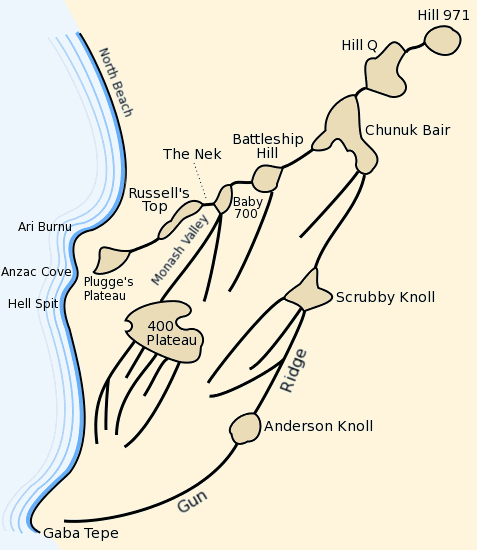
The key positions around Anzac Cove, as named by the Allies

In early August, the Allies attempted to break out from the beach, launching an offensive around Anzac Cove in the centre of the Allied position, as well as Suvla Bay to the north, and Cape Helles to the south; the 10th Battalion played a support role during the offensive, providing reinforcement parties and machine-gun crews to support the 1st Brigade during the Battle of Lone Pine. The offensive was a costly failure and afterwards stalemate returned to the battlefield. As winter approached, conditions on the peninsula grew harsher and a large number of personnel had to be evacuated sick as a wave of dysentery swept through the battalion. In September, the 2nd Division arrived to reinforce the forces at Anzac. In mid-November, as the Allied commanders debated the future of the campaign, the 3rd Brigade received orders to pull back from the frontline, so that it could be withdrawn to Lemnos for rest. On 16 November, the 10th Battalion took up reserve positions on the beach, before embarking on the transport Princess Ena. It landed at Mudros, and spent the rest of November and December there. Meanwhile, the main Allied force was evacuated from the peninsula, with the last Australian troops withdrawing on 20 December. On Boxing Day 1915, the 10th Battalion sailed for Egypt, arriving in Alexandria on 29 December. Losses on Gallipoli had been heavy – 711 casualties were reported in the battalion between April and September 1915 – and the AIF underwent a period of reorganisation as it was expanded in preparation for its deployment to the European battlefield. As a part of this process, the 10th Battalion provided a cadre of experienced personnel to the newly raised 50th Battalion, which was assigned to the 13th Brigade, 4th Division, and was brought up to strength with fresh recruits from Australia.

==== Western Front ====
In March 1916, the 10th Battalion sailed to France along with the rest of the 1st Division and deployed to the Somme. Arriving at Marseilles in early April, the battalion undertook training at Strazeele before moving by train to Godewaersvelde and then Sailly-sur-la-Lys. In mid-May, the battalion occupied billets in the Petillon Sector; on 19 May the billets were shelled resulting in losses amounting to three killed and seven wounded. On 6 June, the battalion entered the front line for the first time on the Western Front, occupying positions around Fleurbaix. The battalion's first significant action on the Western Front came in late July 1916 when it was involved in the Battle of Pozières, an effort to secure the village of Pozières and the high ground beyond it as part of the wider Battle of the Somme; the battalion's casualties during this battle were around 350. For his actions during this battle, Second Lieutenant Arthur Blackburn, an original member of the battalion who had served with it during the Gallipoli campaign, was awarded the Victoria Cross. A month later, the 10th took part in the fighting around Mouquet Farm, incurring over 100 more casualties. Later, the 10th Battalion fought around Ypres, in Belgium, in front of Hill 60, before being transferred back to the Somme trenches in the winter, during which time they occupied positions around Guedecourt, Cardonette and Bazentin.

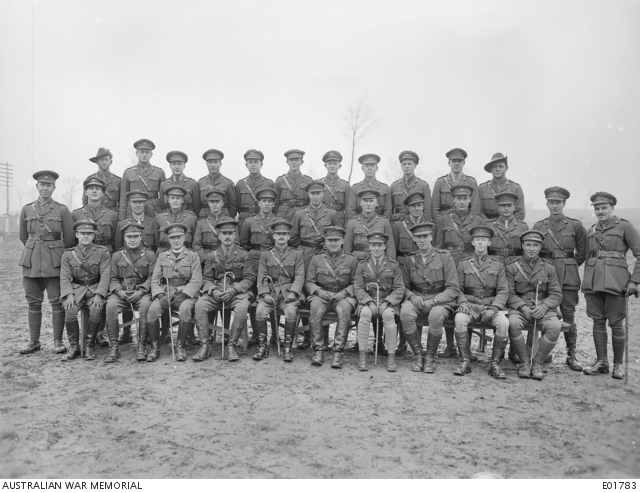
Group portrait of the officers of the 10th Battalion, AIF at Neuve Eglise, Belgium, February 1918.

After the German withdrawal towards the Hindenburg Line in early 1917, the battalion took part in several actions as the Allied line was advanced. The first came around the railway switch at Le Barque in late February. Another attack was made at Lourverval on 8 and 9 April, before undertaking a defensive role during the German attack on Lagnicourt on 15 April. This was followed in early May by the Second Battle of Bullecourt. Later, it was again moved to Belgium to take part in the Third Battle of Ypres, where it was committed to fighting around the Menin Road in September. During an attack around Polygon Wood, Private Roy Inwood's actions resulted in him being awarded the battalion's second Victoria Cross. The battalion suffered heavily during its early involvement in the Ypres fighting and was briefly withdrawn before being recommitted to support operations around Broodseinde at the beginning of October. In the early hours of 9 October 1917, a force of 88 men from the 10th Battalion carried out a raid on German positions in what became known as the "Mystery of Celtic Wood"; 32 men were killed during the raid, and a further 37 were wounded. In November, the battalion was withdrawn to the Boulogne area for rest, before returning to Belgium in December, occupying positions around Messines.

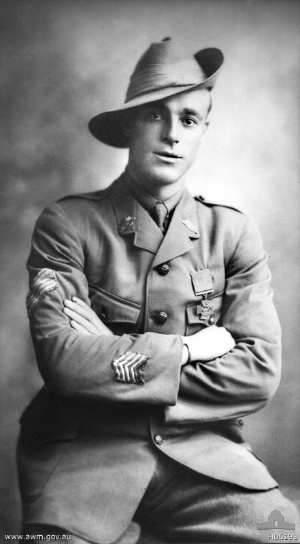
Roy Inwood, who received the Victoria Cross for his actions during the fighting around Polygon Wood

In early 1918, following the collapse of Russia, the Germans were able to transfer many troops to the Western Front. In March, they launched the Spring Offensive, attacking the southern part of the British sector in the Somme. As the Allies were pushed back towards Amiens, the Australian divisions were brought south to help blunt the attack. Throughout late March and into April 1918, the 10th Battalion took part in a series of defensive actions, including fighting around Hazebrouck, as the German offensive was halted, before joining in the preliminary operations before the Allied Hundred Days Offensive that ultimately brought about an end to the war. It was at this stage in the fighting, in late June, during fighting around Merris in France, that Corporal Phillip Davey earned the battalion's third Victoria Cross. A peaceful penetration operation planned by Lieutenant Colonel Maurice Wilder-Neligan, the attack began as a demonstration to cover an attack by British units to the south. Through a series of patrols and small-scale raids, the battalion secured 450 metres (1,480 ft) of ground, captured a large quantity of weapons and equipment and 35 prisoners, and inflicted over 100 casualties for just seven of its own killed, and 37 wounded. The effort so impressed the British Inspector General that he described it as "the best show ever done by a battalion in France".

On 8 August 1918, when the Allies launched the Hundred Days Offensive, the battalion participated in an attack on Amiens that has since been described as one of the most successful for the Allies on the Western Front and, in the words of Erich Ludendorff, the "... blackest day for the German Army". The battalion was out of the line when the offensive began, but followed up the advance moving through Corbie to Harbonnieres. There, on 10 August, the battalion supported the 9th Battalion's attack on Crepey Wood, which was cleared and then occupied. Throughout the afternoon, the battalion endured a heavy artillery bombardment and then repulsed a strong German counter-attack. The next day, the 10th captured Lihons, with the support of the 12th Battalion. A period of rest out of the line followed, before the battalion was committed to another attack around Proyart on 23 August. The attack was very successful, resulting in the battalion advancing 6,000 yards (5,500 m) and securing important high features and woods around Cappy.

The battalion remained at the front until late September 1918; its last battle took place at Jeancourt on 18 September, during which it suffered a further 140 casualties. Later in the month, the Australian Corps, having been severely depleted due to heavy casualties and the dwindling supply of reinforcements from Australia, was withdrawn from the line for rest and re-organisation. As a result, the battalion took no further part in the fighting and when the Armistice was declared on 11 November 1918 it was moving by train from Brucamps to Ephey to return to the front. Over 9,000 men served in the battalion's ranks during the war, including over 25 full drafts of reinforcements, and miscellaneous transfers from other units and general service reinforcements. Casualties totalled 1,015 men killed and 2,136 wounded. In addition to the three Victoria Crosses, members of the battalion were awarded one Companion of the Order of St Michael and St George, nine Distinguished Service Orders and one Bar, 34 Military Crosses and four Bars, sixteen Distinguished Conduct Medals, 149 Military Medals plus 11 Bars and one second Bar, and nine Meritorious Service Medals. In 1927, the battalion was awarded a total of 24 battle honours for its war service.

Following the cessation of hostilities, the Australian government decided that it would not contribute to the proposed Allied occupation force in Germany and would begin the process of demobilisation of the AIF as soon as possible. Owing to the large number of soldiers deployed overseas, this process took some time, and it was decided to progressively return men from each battalion, rather than send them home as a formed unit. As numbers dwindled, units were amalgamated for administrative purposes, and as a consequence the 9th and 10th Battalions were merged on 5 February 1919; the final contingent of troops from the 10th Battalion did not return home until September 1919 when they disembarked in Adelaide from the transport SS Takada.

'Twas not within a barrack yard they put us through our drill,
They licked us into soldier shape in camp at Morphettville;
So khaki-clad and Enfield-armed, we'll fight at Tommy's side,
To hold secure the fields of France against the German tide.

Chorus

Left, right, left, right; keep the column swinging;
Every step our destination nears;
Long, long miles we'll shorten by our singing,
Kits are heavy but a chorus cheers—
All our help old Mother England's needing—
Soon we'll have to prove that we are men,
And the 10th Battalion will be leading;
We're Australians in Old Ten.

We hail from busy Rundle Street and north of Goyder's line;
But far from there, beneath strange skies, our glinting bayonets shine.
For half the world is now between us and the crowded quay
Where to the strains of "Auld Lang Syne" our troopship puts to sea.

We long to hear the maxim's purr and smell the cordite strong,
Across the busy firing line the crowded trench along;
The chatter that our rifles make, as down the line it runs
To swell that wartime music grand, the chorus of the guns.

The magic of the new lands we see won't banish from our mind
Those bright-eyed, dear Australian maids, the best of all girlkind;
The grand old Jack, wind-blown, above, with all its colours bright,
Means them and home, and all we love; so we march out to fight.

— The battalion song, written by C.R. Beresford with music by H. Brewster-Jones.

=== Inter-war years ===
In late 1918, while the AIF unit was still deployed, the part-time units of the Citizens Force (later known as the Militia) were reorganised. At this time, several battalions were raised as part of the 10th Infantry Regiment in South Australia. This unit drew its lineage from the 78th Infantry Regiment, which could trace its history to two battalions of the Adelaide Rifles. The act of merging these units was part of a larger Army-wide reorganisation that created a convoluted lineage in many units, which according to historian Peter Stanley has resulted in confusion among military historians. In 1921, when the AIF was officially disbanded and the part-time military forces were reorganised to perpetuate the AIF's numerical designations, the 10th Battalion was re-raised in its own right in Adelaide, drawing personnel from the 2nd Battalions of the 10th, 32nd, 48th, and 50th Infantry Regiments. Through these links, the 10th Battalion inherited a battle honour from the Boer War. At this time it was allocated to the 3rd Brigade, which was part of the 4th Military District.

The battalion received a King's Colour in 1925 in recognition of its service during World War I. Two years later, in 1927, territorial titles were introduced and the battalion assumed the designation of "The Adelaide Rifles". The motto Pro Patria was adopted at this time. In 1930, amid the austerity of the Great Depression and following the election of the Scullin Labor government and the subsequent suspension of the compulsory training scheme, the decision was made to amalgamate the battalion due to a decline in the numbers of volunteers. It was merged with the 50th Battalion, with whom it shared history, to become the 10th/50th Battalion. Again the unit was assigned to the 3rd Brigade.

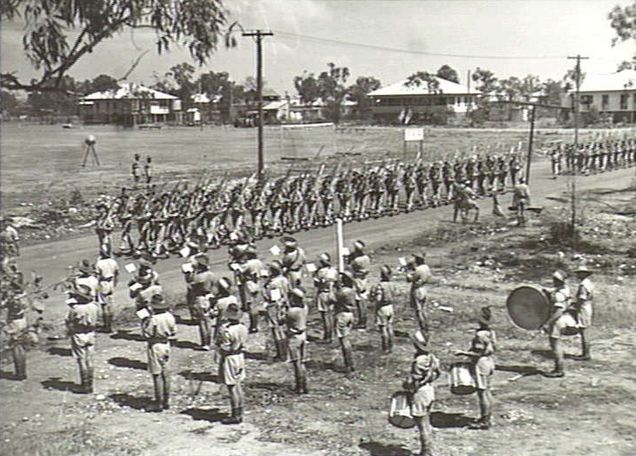
Band members from the 10th/48th Battalion on parade in Darwin, September 1944.

The 10th and 50th remained linked until October 1936; at that time, in response to fears of a possible war in Europe following the reoccupation of the Rhineland, it was decided to expand the size of the Militia. As a result, on 1 October 1936, the 10th/50th Battalion was split and the 10th Battalion was re-raised as a separate unit, and was once again assigned to the 3rd Brigade.

=== World War II ===
After Japan's entry into World War II in December 1941, the 10th Battalion mobilised at Warradale to undertake garrison duties in Australia. While the 3rd Brigade's two other battalions – the 27th and 43rd – were sent to Darwin, the 10th was detached to the 28th Brigade, and initially deployed to Warrawong on the New South Wales south coast, defending the strategically important industrial area around Wollongong, but in August it was ordered to join Northern Territory Force and moved to Darwin to defend the port against a possible Japanese invasion. Before it arrived, though, an Army-wide reorganisation resulted in the 10th being amalgamated with the 48th Battalion, to form the 10th/48th Battalion on 27 August 1942.

The reorganisation was the result of personnel shortages that had come about due to an over-mobilisation of the Australian military, and resulted in the amalgamation of several Militia units; however, it was largely an amalgamation in name only as most of the former 48th Battalion personnel were used to raise the 108th Light Anti-Aircraft Regiment. In 1943, the 10th/48th Australian Infantry Battalion was gazetted as an "AIF" unit; as more than three-quarters of the unit volunteered for overseas service, this status meant that the battalion could be deployed outside Australian territory. Nevertheless, it remained in the Northern Territory, undertaking garrison duties in Darwin and its surrounding areas. As the threat to the port diminished, the garrison was reduced to a single brigade in July 1944, at which time the 10th/48th was reassigned to the 12th Brigade. The battalion remained in Darwin until June 1945 when it was moved to Brisbane, Queensland. It was disbanded on 8 August 1945, having never served outside Australia during the war.

During the war, another battalion with a similar designation, the 2/10th Battalion, was raised as part of the all-volunteer Second Australian Imperial Force (2nd AIF). The units of the 2nd AIF were considered separate from those of the Militia, although many members of the Militia volunteered to join the 2nd AIF. Recruited from South Australians, the 2/10th was raised in mid-October 1939 and formed part of the 18th Brigade that was initially assigned to the 6th Division before being transferred to the 7th. Over the course of the war it served in the United Kingdom, North Africa, New Guinea and Borneo before being disbanded in December 1945.

=== Post World War II ===
In 1948, when Australia's part-time military force was re-raised as the Citizens Military Force (CMF), the 10th Battalion returned to the order of battle, readopting the designation of "The Adelaide Rifles". Throughout the 1950s, as part of Central Command, the battalion provided training for national servicemen until 1960, when a widespread re-organisation of the CMF saw the creation of six state-based multi-battalion regiments as the smaller, regional regiments of the past were consolidated. As a result, the 10th Battalion was subsumed into the pentropic 1st Battalion, Royal South Australia Regiment, providing two companies: 'D' (The Adelaide Company) and 'E' (The Port Adelaide Company). In 1961, the battalion, although technically off the Army's order of battle, was entrusted with the 12 battle honours that had been earned by the 2/10th Battalion during World War II.

In 1965, the Australian Army ended its brief experiment with the pentropic divisional establishment, and on 1 July 1965 the 10th Battalion, Royal South Australia Regiment, was re-raised as a unit in its own right. This battalion remained on the order of battle as an Australian Army Reserve unit until 29 November 1987, when it was amalgamated with the 27th Battalion, to form the 10th/27th Battalion, Royal South Australia Regiment (10/27 RSAR). This battalion has adopted the 10th Battalion's Unit colour patch, carries the colours of both the 10th and 27th Battalions, and perpetuates the battle honours of both of these units and several South Australian battalions of the 2nd AIF that were raised for service during World War II; it also recruits from the same areas, being headquartered in Adelaide with depots across South Australia and in Broken Hill.

== Commanding officers ==
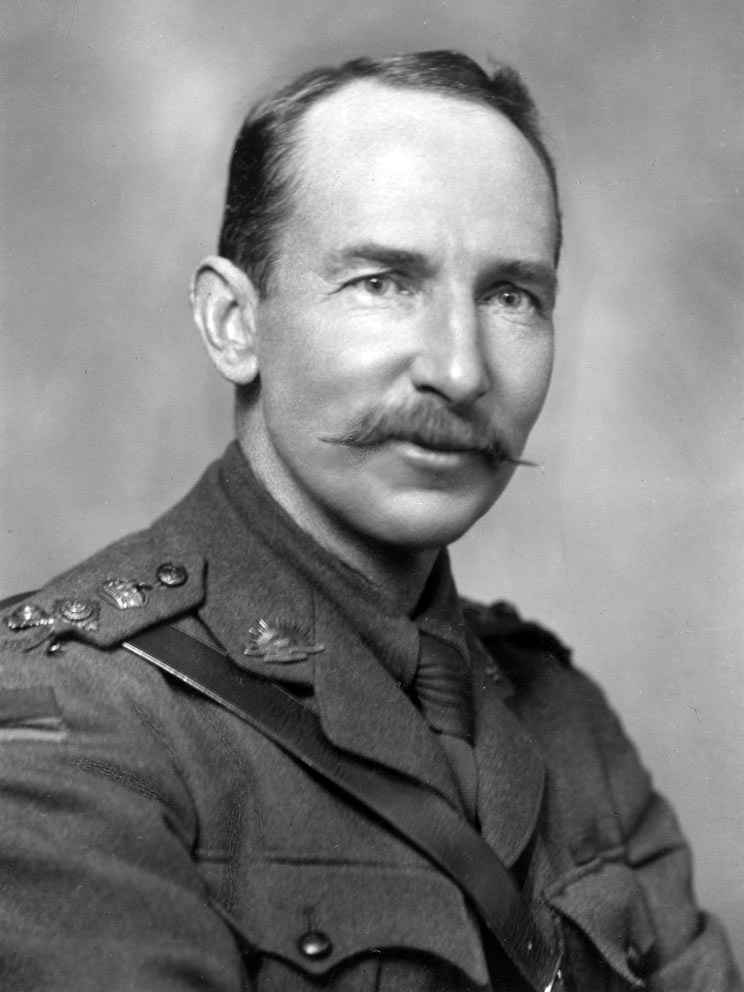
Stanley Price Weir commanded the battalion at Gallipoli and during 1916 on the Western Front

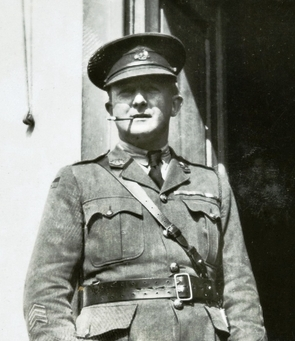
Maurice Wilder-Neligan commanded the battalion for most of the last 18 months of World War I

The 10th Battalion's commanding officers during World War I, listed in chronological order of the date they first commanded the battalion, were as follows:

Officer	Dates of command	Citations
Lieutenant Colonel Stanley Price Weir	16 August – 31 October 1914; 7 December 1914 – 25 August 1915; 5 March – 8 May 1916; 16 May – 23 August 1916	
Major Frederick William Hurcombe	1 November – 6 December 1914	
Major George Dorricutt Shaw	25 August – 21 October 1915; 8–16 May 1916; 11–18 January 1918; 23–31 January 1918; 11 February – 30 March 1918; 11–16 May 1918; 28 June – 7 July 1918	
Lieutenant Colonel Miles Fitzroy Beevor	21 October 1915 – 4 March 1916	
Lieutenant Colonel Maurice Wilder-Neligan	23 June – 5 July 1917; 15 July – 25 September 1917; 9 October 1917 – 11 January 1918; 18–23 January 1918; 31 January – 11 February 1918; 20 May – 28 June 1918; 7 July – 12 August 1918; 16–27 August 1918; 6–30 September 1918; 4 October 1918 – 1 January 1919	
Lieutenant Colonel George Ernest Redburg (Note: The Australian War Memorial website does not list Redburg as commanding the battalion, but Lock lists Redburg commanding the battalion (as a temporary lieutenant colonel) during several periods.)	23 August – 27 September 1916; 30 September – 19 November 1916; 6–23 December 1916	
Lieutenant Colonel James Samuel Denton	27–30 September 1916	
Major Felix Gordon Giles (Note: Son of explorer Alfred Giles.)	19 November – 6 December 1916; 5–15 July 1917	
Major Rupert Anstice Rafferty	23 December 1916 – 4 February 1917	
Lieutenant Colonel Ross Blyth Jacob	4 February – 27 April 1917; 11 May – 23 June 1917; 30 March – 11 May 1918	
Major Alexander Steele	27 April – 11 May 1917	
Captain Gordon Cathcart Campbell (Note: Nephew of Chief Justice of South Australia Sir Samuel Way.)	25–28 June 1917	
Major Clarence Rumball	28 September – 9 October 1917	
Captain Roy Kintore Hurcombe (Note: The Australian War Memorial website does not list Hurcombe as commanding the battalion, but Lock lists him commanding the battalion for a few days between May and September 1918, but the exact details are not clear.)	Several days between May and September 1918	
Lieutenant Colonel John Newman	16–20 May 1918	
Major William Francis James McCann	27 August – 6 September 1918; 30 September – 4 October 1918; 1 January – 17 March 1919	

The 10th Battalion's commanding officers during the late 1930s and World War II, were as follows:

Officer	Dates of command	Citations
Lieutenant Colonel William Veale	1 October 1936 to 1 June 1940	
Lieutenant Colonel John Hill	1 June 1940 to 1 June 1942	
Lieutenant Colonel Lindsay Farquhar	1 June 1942 to 22 July 1942	

The 10th/48th Battalion's commanding officers during World War II were as follows:

Officer	Dates of command	Citations
Lieutenant Colonel Kenneth McEwin	11 August 1942 to 9 January 1943	
Lieutenant Colonel Thomas Davies	9 January 1943 to 29 October 1945	

== Battle honours ==
The 10th Battalion received the following battle honours:

- South Africa 1899–1902 (inherited);
- World War I: Somme 1916–18, Pozières, Bullecourt, Ypres, Menin Road, Polygon Wood, Broodseinde, Poelcappelle, Passchendaele, Lys, Hazebrouck, Kemmel, Amiens, Albert 1918, Hindenburg Line, Epehy, France and Flanders 1916–18, ANZAC, Landing at ANZAC, Defence at ANZAC, Suvla, Sari Bair, Gallipoli 1915, Egypt 1915–16.
- World War II: North Africa 1941, Defence of Tobruk, The Salient 1941, South West Pacific 1942–45, Buna–Gona, Cape Endaiadere–Sinemi Creek, Sanananda–Cape Killerton, Milne Bay, Liberation of Australian New Guinea, Shaggy Ridge, Borneo, Balikpapan (inherited).

== See also ==
- List of Australian Victoria Cross recipients
