= Mystery of Celtic Wood =

Apparent disappearance of 71 men in 1917

Coordinates: 50°52′00″N 03°00′00″E

The Mystery of Celtic Wood refers to the apparent disappearance without trace of 71 men of the 10th Battalion of the 1st Australian Division during a diversionary attack on German positions in Celtic Wood, near Passchendaele in West Flanders, during the Battle of Poelcappelle (9 October 1917) in the First World War. Official Army reports of the action state that investigations have failed to account for the fate of 37 men of the 10th Battalion. German records contain no mention of the attack, which led to speculation that the men were massacred and buried in a mass grave. Visitors to the site today are still given this explanation by guides. Rumours persist that the men had simply walked into a mist and disappeared. Some investigators attribute the lack of record of the missing to confusion, mis-reporting and clerical error.

== Background ==
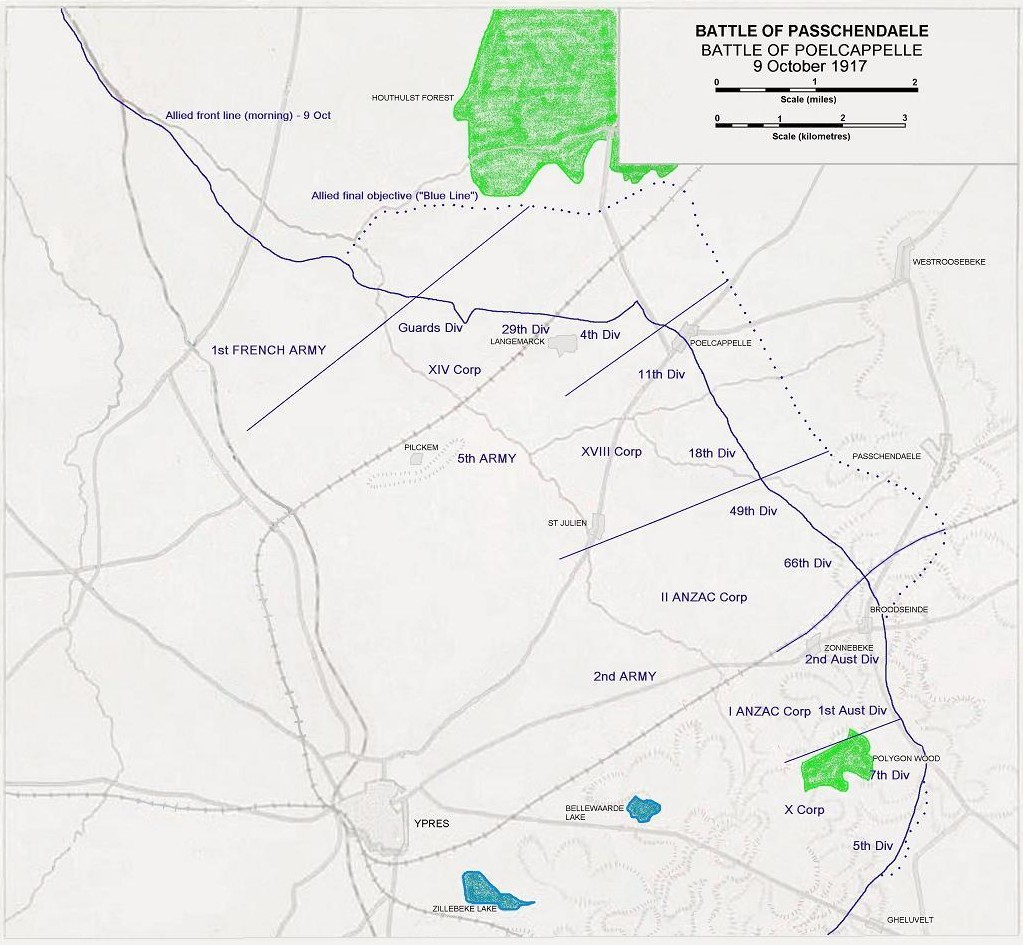
Battle of Poelcappelle, 1917, showing Allied forces, their starting line and their objectives

The 10th Battalion of the 1st Australian Division were known as the "Terrible 10th", a name given for the fighting spirit displayed in the trenches of the Western Front. Two of its members had been awarded the Victoria Cross and during the Gallipoli Campaign, where they led the Australian forces in the initial landing and later defence of ANZAC Cove.

Following the success of the Battle of Broodseinde on 4 October 1917, Field Marshal Sir Douglas Haig, Commander-in-Chief (C-in-C) of the British Expeditionary Force (BEF) on the Western Front, believed that the opposing German 4th Army was close to collapse. He decided on an offensive to capture part of the Passchendaele Ridge (the Battle of Poelcappelle) with a subsequent attack to capture the rest of the Passchendaele Ridge, which was later known as the First Battle of Passchendaele.

The 10th Battalion of the 1st Australian Division had to raid Celtic Wood. The plan was for the 10th to charge the woods, blow up German dugouts and retire on a flare signal. On the northern flank of the 10th Battalion, the 2nd Australian Division would mount a large attack to protect the flank of the main British advance on its northern flank. To mislead Germans that the attack was part of the main advance, instead of the normal night attack, the troops attacked at dawn while the normal "box barrage" used to protect infantry raids was replaced with a creeping barrage used for attacks. At 5:20 a.m. on 9 October, the barrage began and seven officers and 78 men of the 10th Battalion under the command of 22-year-old Lieutenant Frank Scott advanced.

== Raid ==
British war correspondents and Australian newspapers reported the attack on Celtic Wood as a victory. Although the attack failed, the Germans pulled back a week later and the woods became a no man's land.

10th Battalion commander Lieutenant-Colonel Maurice Wilder-Neligan wrote in his report of the action: "...a desperate hand encounter followed, in which heavy casualties were inflicted upon the enemy...I am only able to account for 14 unwounded members of the party". One man said only seven made it back to the Australian lines while another said the number was 14. Official army records list 37 of the 85 involved in the attack as missing:

On this day LT Scott of 10 Bn led 84 men on a raid into enemy lines near Broodseinde. The main party was seen to enter Celtic Wood and were never seen again. Extensive investigations since that time have failed to fully account for the fate of LT Scott's party. A total of 37 soldiers are still not accounted for. This is the greatest mystery for the AIF in WW 1.

— Australian Defence Department, History Unit listing of Celtic Wood action.

== Aftermath ==
=== Analysis ===
The Australian war correspondent Charles Bean wrote "...the operation ended disastrously. The missing were never heard of again. Their names were not in any list of prisoners received during the war. The Graves Commission found no trace of their bodies after it". German military records contained no mention of the attack, leading some historians to speculate that they were massacred by German troops and buried in a secret mass grave. At least six books have been published attempting to explain the mystery. Many professional historians misread Wilder-Neligan's report (and those of survivors) to mean that only 14 soldiers of the 85 were accounted for and the fate of the 71 missing men was widely debated. In fact, the number of "missing" included bodies not recovered but whose deaths were reported by survivors. It is unknown how many returned wounded but the ambiguous official records did imply a total of 48 unwounded, wounded and known killed in action leaving only 37 actually unaccounted for. As well as the speculation regarding the fate of the 37 missing, it was still considered a mystery as to why no remains of those known to have died could be found.

The incident is known as the greatest mystery of Australia's Great War. Perhaps due to the name of the woods and the mystery surrounding the missing men, there has been talk of a supernatural event and the action has been referred to as the nation's wartime equivalent of Picnic at Hanging Rock.

=== Explanation ===
"Raid on Celtic Wood", written by Robert Kearney, refutes the myths of the raid and establishes the fate of each of the 85 men to a definite or at least "most probable explanation".

Rather than the "rolling curtain of death" expected to shield the attack, the barrage was light and scattered when the 10th Battalion advanced across the 180 metres (200 yd) separating Celtic Wood from the Australian trenches. The terrain to be crossed consisted of tree stumps, bomb craters metres wide and, due to heavy rain over the preceding days, mud that in some places was knee-deep. Compounding this, the 10th Battalion had raided Celtic Wood twice the previous week, leading the Germans to reinforce the position and install more machine-guns. Lieutenant Scott ordered a frontal attack on the German trench, while he led a group around the flank to attack from behind. Despite being outnumbered, Scott was successful and the German troops began a retreat as soon as they were fired on from the rear. German reinforcements quickly arrived and engaged the Australians in hand-to-hand combat, pushing them back while at the same time German artillery opened fire, barraging no man's land, making a retreat impossible. Within a short time all the officers were dead or wounded and Sergeant William Cole tried to fire the flare signalling the withdrawal but was killed as he was firing the flare and the survivors were left to find their own way back.

In 2008, researchers Chris Henschke and Robert Kearney claimed to have solved the mystery. By analysing after action reports, wartime diaries and witness statements that could be verified, they believed they had accounted for the fate of the missing men beyond a reasonable doubt, attributing the mystery to the fog of war, clerical errors and misreporting. Study of the remaining records led researchers to believe that a massacre was unlikely as the British had begun an artillery barrage on the position, preventing German troops from pursuing the retreating Australians. At the same time the German artillery barrage continued, preventing the Australians from retreating. Caught in the barrages, the 37 missing soldiers were likely killed by the shelling and along with the bodies of those previously killed in the attack, left no recognisable remains to be recovered.

Henschke stated:

...The raid wasn't a great mystery, but it was simply a raid with a very high proportion of casualties... It is a story of a typical small unit action that went wrong.

— Henschke
