= Oudezeele =

Oudezeele Oudezele
- Commune
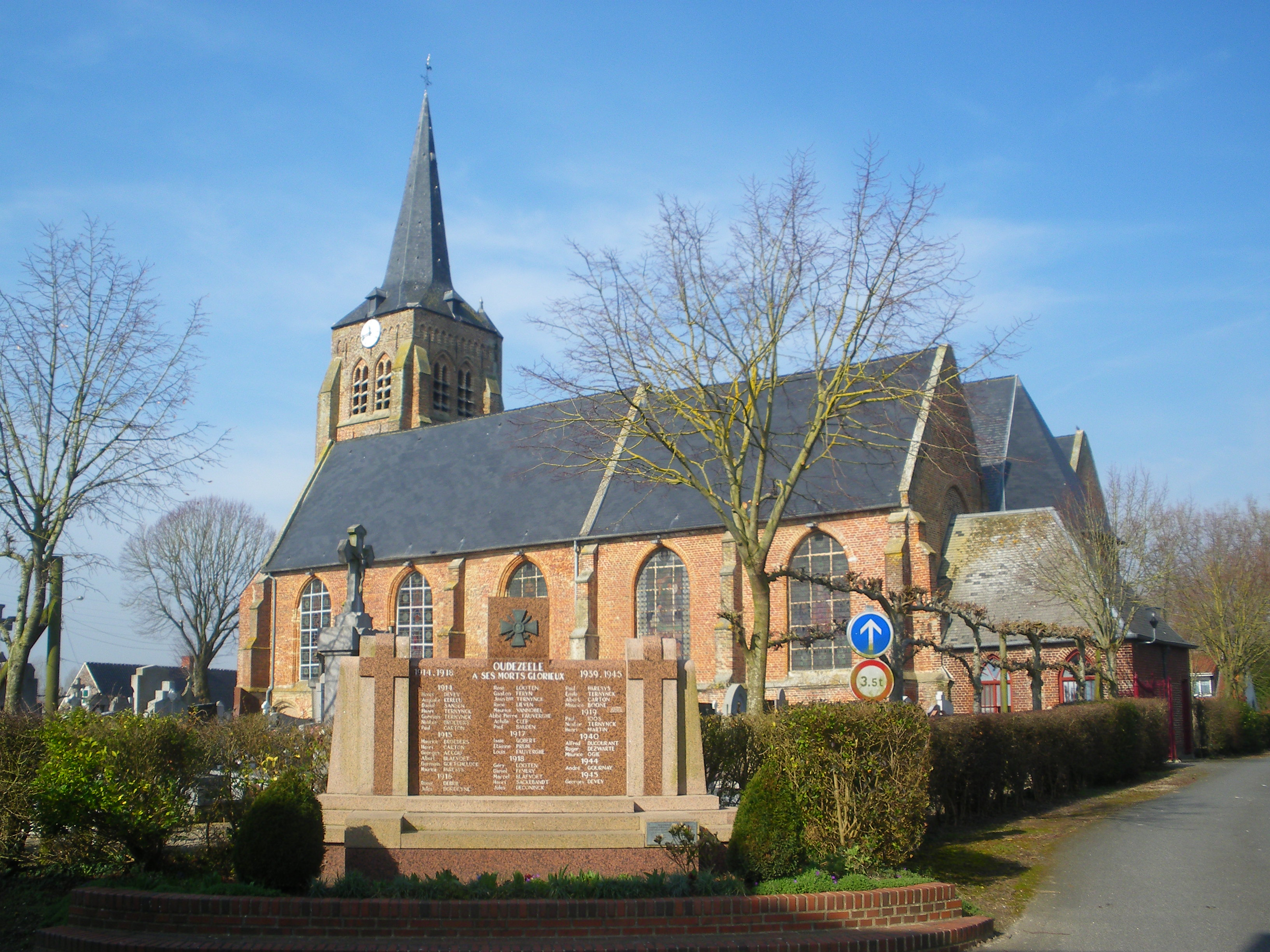
- The church in Oudezeele

- Coat of arms
- Location of Oudezeele
- Location within France Location within Hauts-de-France
- Coordinates: 50°50′20″N 2°30′36″E
- Country: France
- Region: Hauts-de-France
- Department: Nord
- Arrondissement: Dunkerque
- Canton: Wormhout
- Intercommunality: CA Cœur de Flandre

Government
  - Mayor (2020–2026): Jean-Luc Debert
- Area^{1}: 9.36 km^{2} (3.61 sq mi)
- Elevation: 10 m (33 ft)
- Highest elevation: 47 m (154 ft)
- Lowest elevation: 16 m (52 ft)
- Population (2023): 690
  - Density: 74/km^{2} (190/sq mi)
- Demonym: Oudezeelois (es)
- Time zone: UTC+01:00 (CET)
  - Summer (DST): UTC+02:00 (CEST)
- INSEE/Postal code: 59453 /59670
- ^{1} French Land Register data, which excludes lakes, ponds, glaciers > 1 km^{2} (0.386 sq mi or 247 acres) and river estuaries.

Oudezeele (French pronunciation: [udəzɛl]; from Flemish; Oudezele in modern Dutch spelling) is a commune in the Nord department in northern France. It is around 45 km north-west of Lille. The population is 690 (as of 2022).

== Heraldry ==
Arms of Oudezeele	The arms of Oudezeele are blazoned : Argent, 3 horns sable tied gules. (Hardifort, Merris and Oudezeele use the same arms.)

== See also ==
- Communes of the Nord department
