= Stanley Price Weir =

Australian Army officer (1866–1944)

Stanley Price Weir DSO, VD, JP
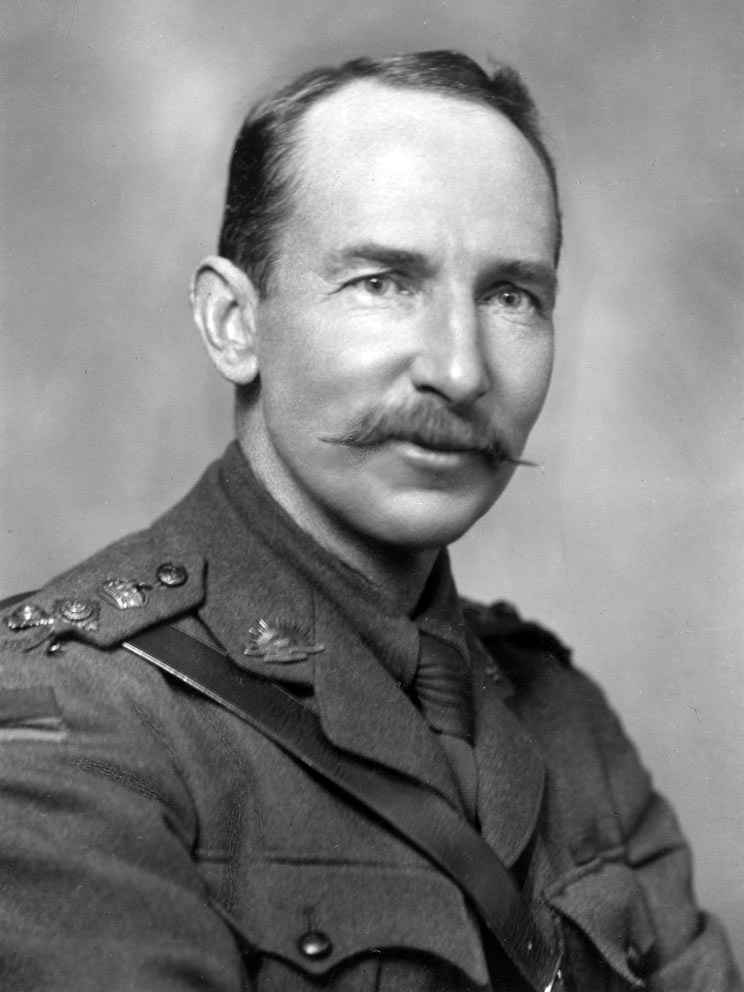
- Weir wearing the rank of colonel
- Born: 23 April 1866; Norwood, Province of South Australia, British Empire
- Died: 14 November 1944 (aged 78); St Peters, South Australia, Australia
- Burial place: West Terrace Cemetery, Adelaide
- Spouses: Rosa Wadham (m. 1890; died 1923) Lydia Maria Schrapel (m. 1926)
- Military career
- Allegiance: Australia
- Branch: Australian Army
- Service years: 1885–1921
- Rank: Brigadier General
- Commands: 10th Infantry Regiment (1908–12); 19th Infantry Brigade (1913–14); 10th Battalion, AIF (1914–16); 20th Infantry Brigade, AMF (1918–21)
- Conflicts: World War I; Gallipoli Campaign; Western Front; Battle of Pozières; Battle of Mouquet Farm
- Awards: Distinguished Service Order; Volunteer Officers' Decoration; Mentioned in Despatches; Order of St. Anne, 2nd Class with Swords (Russia)
- Other work: Public Service Commissioner

Brigadier General Stanley Price Weir, DSO, VD, JP (23 April 1866 – 14 November 1944) was an Australian public servant and Army officer. During World War I, he commanded the 10th Battalion of the Australian Imperial Force (AIF) during the landing at Anzac Cove and the subsequent Gallipoli Campaign, and during the Battles of Pozières and Mouquet Farm in France.

Weir returned to Australia at his own request in late 1916 at the age of 50, and in 1917 he was awarded the Distinguished Service Order and was mentioned in despatches for his performance at Pozières and Mouquet Farm. He went on to become the first South Australian Public Service Commissioner. He was given an honorary promotion to brigadier general on his retirement from the Australian Military Forces in 1921. Weir was retired as public service commissioner in 1931. In retirement he contributed to various benevolent and charitable organisations, and died in 1944.

== Early life ==
Weir was born in Norwood, South Australia, on 23 April 1866, a son of Alfred Weir and Susannah Mary (née Price). His father was a carpenter, who had emigrated to South Australia from Aberdeen, Scotland, in 1839, two years after the colony was founded. Stanley Weir attended Moore's School, the Norwood Public School, and Pulteney Street School. In 1879, at the age of 13, he joined the Surveyor General's Department as an office assistant. He assisted the surveyor who pegged out the land at the rear of Government House, Adelaide, for the Torrens Parade Ground, and was later promoted to clerk. On 14 May 1890, he married Rosa Wadham at the Christian Chapel, Norwood. He rose through the department to be appointed Survey Storekeeper, Custodian of Plans and Custodian of Government Motor Cars, on 1 July 1911. He was appointed a justice of the peace on 10 September 1914.

== Early military service ==
Weir enlisted in the part-time South Australian Volunteer Military Force in March 1885, joining the 1st Battalion, Adelaide Rifles, as a private. By 1890, he had been promoted to colour sergeant. He was commissioned as a lieutenant in the 3rd Battalion, Adelaide Rifles, on 19 March 1890, and was promoted to captain on 25 May 1893. When the South African War broke out he volunteered for service with the South Australian Bushmen's Corps, but mounted officers were preferred, and he was not selected.

On 1 July 1903, the Adelaide Rifles became the 10th Infantry Regiment of the Commonwealth Military Forces, and Weir was appointed adjutant. He was promoted to major on 1 January 1904, and appointed as regimental second-in-command. He was awarded the Long Service and Good Conduct Medal in 1905, and the Volunteer Officers' Decoration in 1908. On 22 June 1908, Weir was promoted to lieutenant colonel and appointed the commanding officer of the 10th Infantry Regiment. On 1 January 1912, he was transferred to the unattached list but this only lasted until 1 July, when the universal training scheme was introduced. He was soon appointed to command the 19th Infantry Brigade, and on 9 September 1913 he was promoted to colonel.

== World War I ==
On 12 August 1914, after the outbreak of the First World War, Weir received a telegram from Colonel Ewen Sinclair-MacLagan, the designated commander of the 3rd Brigade, offering him the command of the 10th Battalion. Weir promptly accepted, and on 17 August was appointed as a lieutenant colonel in the Australian Imperial Force (AIF), making him the first South Australian to be commissioned in the AIF. He retained his rank of colonel in the part-time forces in an honorary capacity.

=== Gallipoli ===
Weir assembled and trained his battalion at the Morphettville Racecourse, then embarked with them on the transport Ascanius on 20 October 1914 as the first convoy of Australian troops departed for overseas service. On arrival in Fremantle, six companies of the 11th Battalion were embarked on the transport, and Weir was appointed Officer Commanding Troops for the voyage. The troops began disembarking at Alexandria on 6 December 1914, and were entrained for Cairo, where they began to set up camp at Mena. The Australian Official War Historian, Charles Bean, described Weir as being "somewhat above average in years" for a battalion commander. Following the Allied decision to land a force on the Gallipoli Peninsula, the 3rd Brigade was selected as the covering force for the landing at Anzac Cove. The 10th Battalion embarked for the Greek island of Lemnos in the northern Aegean Sea on 1 March 1915, and after further training on Lemnos, the battalion was one of the first two battalions ashore on the morning of 25 April 1915.

During the landing, when the boats carrying the lead elements of the battalion were around 40 yards (37 m) from shore, according to Bean, Weir observed to another officer in his boat that everything was silent, but soon after Ottoman troops began firing at the landing force. Weir landed with the scout platoon, and urged both his men and those of the 9th Battalion to immediately begin climbing the cliffs that overlooked the beach. Weir, along with "B" and "C" Companies of the battalion, reached what later became known as "Plugge's Plateau". Heavy fighting followed the initial landing and, within five days, half of Weir's battalion had been killed or wounded. The Australian and New Zealand advance inland from Anzac Cove was subsequently checked by the defending Ottoman forces and was eventually contained in a small beachhead inside a series of ridges that ranged around the cove. Weir was the only commanding officer from the 3rd Brigade to go forward of the first ridge, and a ridge running off the 400 Plateau subsequently became known as "Weir Ridge".

As stalemate set in, Weir continued to command his battalion throughout the early stages of the campaign until 25 August, when he was appointed acting brigadier general and placed in command of the 3rd Brigade. On 11 September, he became ill and was evacuated to Malta, where he was admitted to hospital. He was subsequently evacuated to the United Kingdom, where he convalesced until January 1916, when he was appointed commandant of the Australian reinforcement camp at Weymouth, Dorset.

=== Western Front ===
Weir's health had not completely recovered by the time he embarked for Egypt, and he rejoined his battalion on 4 March 1916. After his departure, the 10th had fought through the remainder of the campaign before being withdrawn along with the rest of the Allied force in December 1915. The battalion was subsequently moved back to Egypt. In mid-1916, the bulk of the AIF was transferred to the Western Front, and Weir led the 10th Battalion through July and August 1916 during the Battles of Pozières and Mouquet Farm. At Pozières, the battalion suffered 350 casualties in four days. By the time of the battle, Weir was the only original battalion commander remaining in the 1st Australian Division, and had turned 50 years of age. On 23 August, immediately after Mouquet Farm, Weir was again appointed acting commander of the 3rd Brigade. Exhausted, on 7 September 1916 he asked to be relieved, and his request was granted. He returned to Australia on 23 September 1916, and his AIF appointment was terminated on 14 December. In the Australian official history of the war, Bean observed that despite his age, Weir "took his battalion into the front line, commanded it there throughout its first battle, and remained longer in the field than almost any of the senior militia officers who had left with the original force".

== Post-war military service ==
After his AIF appointment was terminated, Weir resumed his service in the Citizen Military Forces (CMF). In 1917, he was awarded the Distinguished Service Order and the Russian Empire Order of St. Anne, 2nd Class, with Swords, and was mentioned in despatches for his performance at Pozières and Mouquet Farm. From 1917 to 1920, he was aide-de-camp to the Governor-General of Australia, Sir Ronald Craufurd Munro Ferguson. Weir retired from the CMF as an honorary brigadier general in March 1921, his last appointment being as commander of the 20th Infantry Brigade. He was only the second South Australia-born officer to reach the rank of brigadier general. On 31 March 1921, Weir was appointed Honorary Colonel of the 10th Battalion, a position he held for many years.

== Later life ==
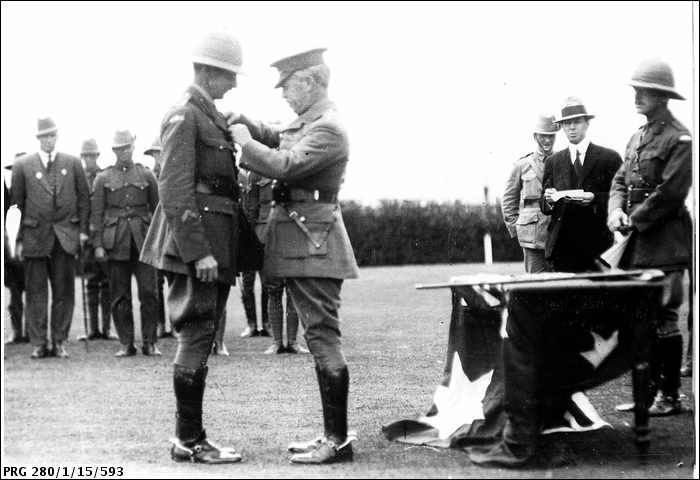
Weir (left foreground) receiving the Distinguished Service Order from the Governor of South Australia, Lieutenant-Colonel Sir Henry Lionel Galway, at Keswick Barracks on 15 January 1919

Weir had two significant advantages in his return to a civilian career. Firstly, he was repatriated well before most servicemen, and secondly, South Australia had implemented a policy of preferment of returned servicemen for government employment. These circumstances helped him gain appointment as the first South Australian Public Service Commissioner in 1916. Weir was not suited to this role, being unable to navigate the competing personal and political agendas of senior public servants and politicians, and was soon sidelined. In 1925, legislative changes made it possible for the government to replace Weir, and this took place in 1930. In the last year-and-a-half before his retirement in 1931, Weir was the chairman of both the Central Board of Health and the Public Relief Board, excelling at the latter.

On 8 June 1923, after many years of poor health, Weir's wife Rosa died. He married Lydia Maria Schrapel in 1926. Weir led an active retirement, contributing to several religious, charitable and welfare organisations and activities. These included the Norwood and Maylands Churches of Christ, Benevolent and Stranger's Friend Society, the Our Boys Institute (OBI), the Masonic Lodge, Cheer-Up Society, and YMCA. At various times he served as President of the Commonwealth Club, the Churches of Christ Union, the St. Peters Sub-Branch of the Returned and Services League, and the Cheer Up Society.

Weir wrote the foreword for the history of the 10th Battalion, titled The Fighting 10th: A South Australian Centenary Souvenir of the 10th Battalion, AIF 1914–1919, which was written by a former member of the battalion, Cecil Lock, and published in 1936. In 1943, Weir was badly injured in a car accident while returning from an OBI camp at Victor Harbor. It was believed that his injuries in the accident contributed to his death on 14 November 1944. Weir was survived by his wife Lydia, and his son Lionel and daughter Beryl from his first marriage. His brother, Harrison Weir, was the State Government Printer. Weir was buried in West Terrace Cemetery.

== Awards ==
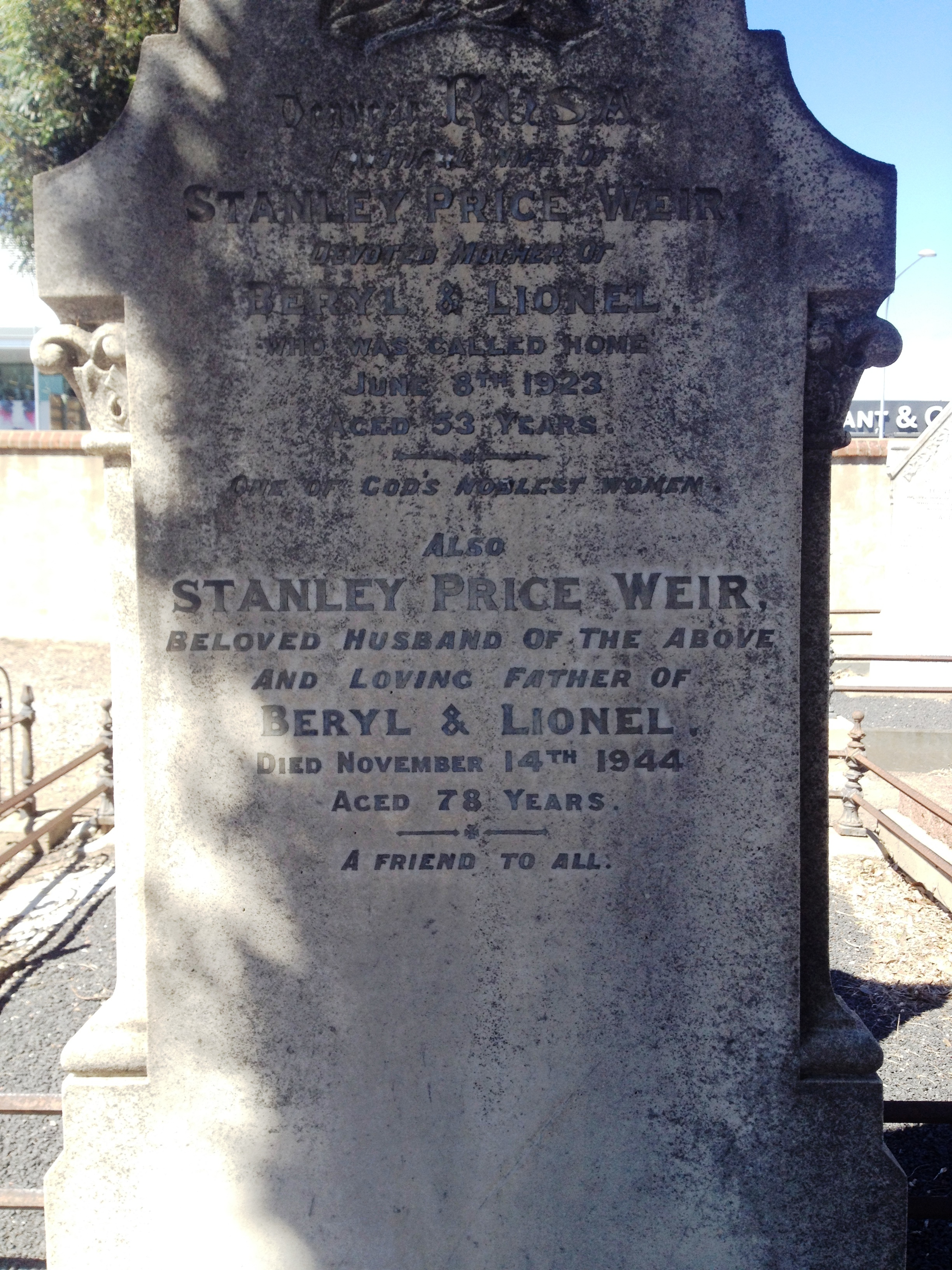
Weir's grave at West Terrace Cemetery, Adelaide, South Australia

Weir received the following honours and awards:

- Long Service and Good Conduct Medal in 1905
- Volunteer Officers' Decoration on 11 April 1908
- Distinguished Service Order on 1 January 1917
- Mentioned in despatches on 4 January 1917
- Order of St. Anne, 2nd Class, with Swords (Russian Empire) on 15 February 1917
- King George V Silver Jubilee Medal on 6 May 1935

== Promotions ==
Weir's military career commenced in March 1885, when he enlisted as a private. He quickly rose to the rank of colour sergeant before being commissioned in 1890. He rose from private to brigadier general over a career spanning 36 years. His officer promotion dates were:

- Lieutenant on 19 March 1890
- Captain on 25 May 1893
- Major on 1 January 1904
- Lieutenant colonel on 22 June 1908
- Colonel on 9 September 1913
- Lieutenant colonel (AIF) on 17 August 1914
- Brigadier general (honorary) on 17 March 1921
