= Hardifort =

Hardifort Hardefoort / Hardenvoorde
- Commune
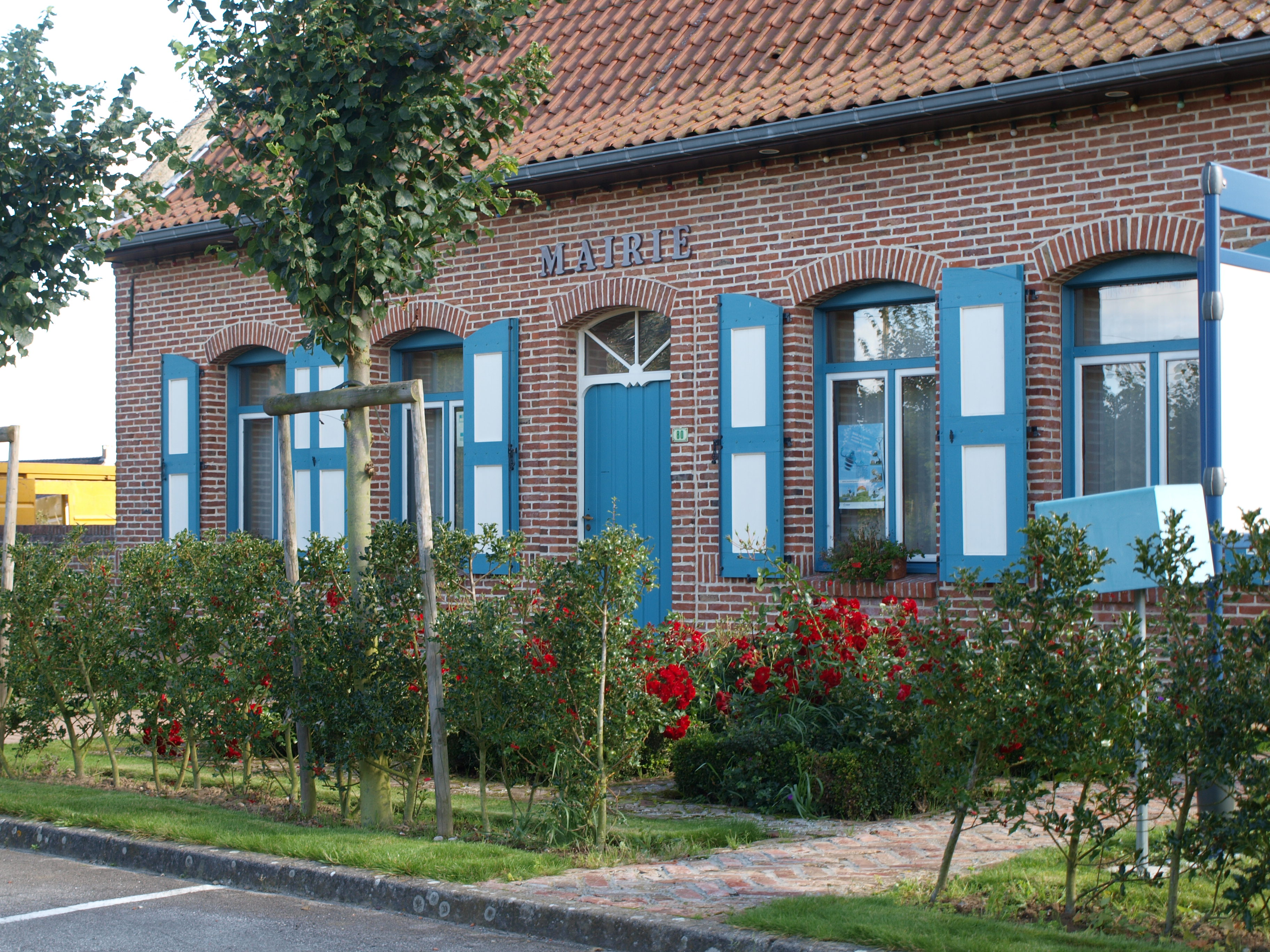
- The town hall in Hardifort

- Coat of arms
- Location of Hardifort
- Location within France Location within Hauts-de-France
- Coordinates: 50°49′14″N 2°29′11″E
- Country: France
- Region: Hauts-de-France
- Department: Nord
- Arrondissement: Dunkerque
- Canton: Wormhout
- Intercommunality: CA Cœur de Flandre

Government
  - Mayor (2020–2026): Caroline Landtsheere
- Area^{1}: 6.14 km^{2} (2.37 sq mi)
- Elevation: 15 m (49 ft)
- Highest elevation: 130 m (430 ft)
- Lowest elevation: 24 m (79 ft)
- Population (2023): 385
  - Density: 62.7/km^{2} (162/sq mi)
- Demonym: Hardifortois (es)
- Time zone: UTC+01:00 (CET)
  - Summer (DST): UTC+02:00 (CEST)
- INSEE/Postal code: 59282 /59670
- ^{1} French Land Register data, which excludes lakes, ponds, glaciers > 1 km^{2} (0.386 sq mi or 247 acres) and river estuaries.

Hardifort (French pronunciation: [aʁdifɔʁ]; Dutch: Hardefoort / Hardenvoorde) is a commune in the Nord department in northern France.

== Heraldry ==
| Arms of Hardifort | The arms of Hardifort are blazoned : Argent, 3 horns sable tied gules. (Hardifort, Merris and Oudezeele use the same arms.) |

== See also ==
- Communes of the Nord department
