= Maurice Wilder-Neligan =

World War I Australian Army officer

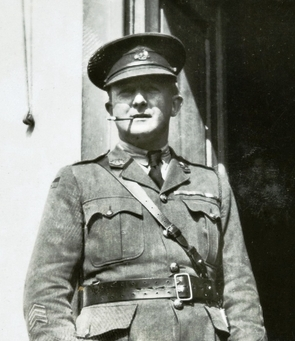
- Wilder-Neligan as a lieutenant colonel, returning to Australia in July 1919
- Born: 4 October 1882; Tavistock, Devon, England
- Died: 10 January 1923 (aged 40); Ekerapi, New Britain, Territory of New Guinea
- Burial place: Garua Island, New Britain
- Military career
- Allegiance: United Kingdom; Australia
- Branch: British Army; Australian Imperial Force; Australian Military Forces; Australian Naval and Military Expeditionary Force
- Service years: 1910–1911; 1914–1921
- Rank: Lieutenant colonel
- Nicknames: Mad Wilder; Mad Neligan; Wily Wilder
- Service number: 974
- Units: Royal Horse Artillery (1910–1911); 9th Battalion (1914–1917)
- Commands: 10th Battalion (1917–1919)
- Conflicts: First World War; Gallipoli campaign; Second Battle of Bullecourt; Battle of the Menin Road Ridge; Battle of Poelcappelle; Battle of the Lys; Hundred Days Offensive
- Awards: Companion of the Order of St Michael and St George; Distinguished Service Order and Bar; Distinguished Conduct Medal; Mentioned in Despatches (5); Croix de guerre (France)

Lieutenant Colonel Maurice Wilder-Neligan, CMG, DSO & Bar, DCM (born Maurice Neligan; 4 October 1882 – 10 January 1923), was an Australian soldier who commanded the South Australian-raised 10th Battalion during the latter stages of World War I. Raised and educated in the United Kingdom, he was briefly a soldier with the Royal Horse Artillery in London, after which he travelled to Australia where he worked in Queensland. He enlisted as a private in the Australian Imperial Force (AIF) on 20 August 1914 at Townsville, under the name Maurice Wilder, giving Auckland, New Zealand, as his place of birth. A sergeant in the 9th Battalion by the time of the Gallipoli landings of April 1915, he was awarded the Distinguished Conduct Medal, the second highest award for acts of gallantry by other ranks. He was quickly commissioned, reaching the rank of temporary captain before the end of the Gallipoli campaign. During his time at Gallipoli he was wounded once, and formally changed his name to Wilder-Neligan.

Arriving on the Western Front with the substantive rank of captain, he led a "most brilliant" raid on German trenches near Fleurbaix, and although severely wounded in the head, stuck to his command until the operation was successfully completed. For his actions he was appointed a Companion of the Distinguished Service Order (DSO), the second highest award for gallantry by officers. When he returned from hospital, he was promoted to major, and was in temporary command of his battalion during the Second Battle of Bullecourt in May 1917. In July, he was promoted to lieutenant colonel and appointed to command the 10th Battalion. He led that unit during the Battle of the Menin Road Ridge in September and was appointed a Companion of the Order of St Michael and St George in June 1918. Perhaps his greatest achievement was the capture of Merris in July, for which he was awarded a bar to his DSO, again for gallantry. He continued to skilfully lead his battalion throughout the Hundred Days Offensive and up to the Armistice of 11 November. During the war, in addition to decorations already mentioned, he was awarded the French Croix de guerre and was mentioned in despatches five times.

After the war, he worked as a district officer in the Australian-administered Territory of New Guinea, where he died at the age of 40, probably of complications from his war wounds. He was buried on Garua Island, New Britain. Considered by many to be rather eccentric, he was also a successful tactician, a skilful organiser, and highly regarded for his treatment of the soldiers under his command.

== Early life ==
Born Maurice Neligan in Tavistock, Devon, England, on 4 October 1882, (Note: According to Lock, his date of birth was 2 October 1882.) he was a son of Canon John West Neligan and his wife Charlotte, née Putland. His elder brother, the Right Reverend Moore Neligan, was the Anglican Bishop of Auckland, New Zealand, from 1903 to 1910. Maurice attended Queen Elizabeth's Grammar School, Ipswich, and Bedford Grammar School.

On 18 February 1905, he was married to a divorcee, Frances Jane Wyatt, in London. In 1908, he was brought before the courts in bankruptcy proceedings, owing some £5,500. During the hearing he stated that he had been at sea during the period 1898–1902, and had not been working since he returned, although he had visited Ceylon late the previous year looking for work. He and his wife had one daughter.

He was enlisted in the Royal Horse Artillery in September 1910, having lowered his age and given Auckland as his place of birth. He served as a soldier for a year before leaving his wife and child at their Park Lane home in London and travelling to Sydney, Australia. In the remaining years before the outbreak of World War I he worked as a clerk at a sugar mill weighbridge in Proserpine, Queensland, and also lived at Kelly's Club Hotel in Brandon, where he formed a close connection to the publican's family.

== World War I ==
Neligan was enlisted in the Australian Imperial Force (AIF) on 20 August 1914 at Townsville, Queensland, under the name Maurice Wilder, again giving Auckland as his place of birth. The AIF was established as Australia's expeditionary force to fight in the war, as the Citizens' Forces were restricted to home defence per the Defence Act (1903). He had first attempted to enlist under his true name and age, and had told the clerk he was married with a child. When told that younger unmarried men were volunteering in great numbers, and that his services would not be required, he merely joined a queue in front of a different clerk, gave the name Wilder and claimed he was a bachelor. With the rank of private he was allotted to the Queensland-raised 9th Battalion of the 3rd Brigade, which was part of the 1st Division, and was given the regimental number 974.

Within three weeks he had been promoted to lance corporal, and by late September was a corporal. The battalion embarked for overseas the following month and sailed via Albany, Western Australia, to Egypt on the Themistocles, arriving in early December. On 1 January 1915, Wilder was promoted to sergeant, and he was posted as the battalion orderly room sergeant.

=== Gallipoli campaign ===
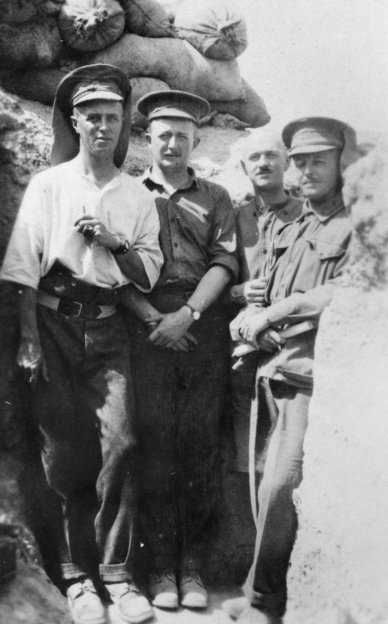
Wilder (second from left) with officers of the 9th Battalion at Gallipoli

After completing training, the 3rd Brigade was designated as the covering force for the landing at Anzac Cove, Gallipoli, on 25 April 1915, and so was the first brigade ashore about 4:30 am. By 9:00 am, Wilder was performing the role of battalion adjutant, assisting the acting commanding officer to organise and direct the unit. The day after the landing, Wilder's actions resulted in the award of the Distinguished Conduct Medal, the second highest award for acts of gallantry by other ranks. The citation read:

For conspicuous gallantry on 26 April 1915, near Gaba Tepe. Assisted by another non-commissioned officer, who was subsequently killed, he carried a wounded man into a place of safety under very heavy fire. Later on he was instrumental in collecting stragglers, who he led back into the firing-line.

Owing to officer casualties, he was commissioned as a second lieutenant three days after the landing. Along with the rest of the 3rd Brigade, the 9th Battalion was closely engaged in establishing and defending the Anzac beachhead during the ensuing months, rotating between the various posts and trenches.

During the heavy Turkish counter-attack of 19 May, Wilder showed "capacity to command at a difficult moment". On the night of 27 May, he commanded a raid by 63 soldiers of the battalion on a Turkish position south of the Anzac perimeter near Gaba Tepe. The destroyer HMS Rattlesnake used its searchlight to pinpoint the trench to be attacked, then pounded it with twenty rounds of high explosive and shrapnel from its guns. Wilder then led his force quickly up the hill towards the Turkish position, and using only the bayonet, they killed six, captured one, and returned to the Australian lines without suffering casualties. According to his biographer, Alec Hill, the success of the raid was ensured by his meticulous planning. He was wounded in early June and evacuated to Egypt, but discharged himself from hospital and returned to his unit by early August, when he was promoted to lieutenant. In the same month, he was mentioned in despatches for the first time.

In mid-September he was formally appointed as unit adjutant, swiftly followed by a temporary promotion to captain. He formally changed his name to Wilder-Neligan in October, and remained at Anzac until November, after which the battalion was evacuated to Egypt. During its time in Egypt, the 9th Battalion was stationed for a period on the front line in the desert near the Suez Canal. On one occasion, an Ottoman patrol was seen, and the adventurous Wilder-Neligan asked to be allowed to take out a patrol on camels to cut them off. With certain restrictions, this was permitted, but no contact with the enemy occurred. In March 1916, he relinquished his post of adjutant, and was substantively promoted to captain before the battalion left Alexandria for France and the Western Front at the end of the month.

=== Western Front ===
==== 9th Battalion ====
Soon after his unit reached the trenches in France, he planned a major raid near Fleurbaix, carefully preparing his men before launching it on the night of 1/2 July. This was a "silent" raid, being undertaken without a preparatory bombardment of the targeted German trenches. Wilder-Neligan split his 148 troops into three groups, and directed them to enter the German trenches about 180 metres (200 yd) apart to avoid German enfilading fire. He trained his raiding party and conducted rehearsals in the days leading up to the operation. On the night of the raid, Wilder-Neligan used machine gun fire to cover the sound of his troops advancing across no man's land. When they were close, he called down a protective barrage behind the German trenches, with machine guns sweeping the enemy flanks. The raiders then rushed forward, entered the enemy trenches and engaging in heavy fighting. During the final rush, Wilder-Neligan came across a German observation post in advance of the enemy trenches. He killed two of the three enemy soldiers occupying it, but the third threw a hand grenade that wounded him severely in the shoulder and in the head, fracturing his skull. Despite his wounds, he continued to direct his men until they had all returned safely. During the raid, the Queenslanders killed 14 Germans, wounded 40, and captured 25 more along with a machine gun, for the loss of seven dead and 26 wounded. The Australian Official War Historian, Charles Bean, described this action as "perhaps the most brilliant raid that Australians undertook" at the time. The success of the operation was recognised by Wilder-Neligan's appointment as a Companion of the Distinguished Service Order, the second highest award for acts of gallantry by officers. The citation read: (Note: The German casualty figure used in this citation is the figure claimed by the Australians on return to their trenches, but German records obtained later gave different figures.)

For conspicuous gallantry when commanding a raid in force. His careful training and fine leading were responsible for the successes attained. Fifty-three of the enemy were killed and prisoners taken, besides a machine gun, many rifles, and much equipment. Though wounded in the head he stuck to his command.

Evacuated to the United Kingdom for treatment, he did not return to his unit until October, when he was promoted to major. In November he was again mentioned in despatches for "distinguished and gallant services and devotion to duty in the field". The 9th Battalion continued to take its turn at the front line through the worst European winter in 40 years. On 24 February, Wilder-Neligan was training his troops for another raid in force, this time on the German position known as "The Maze", south of the village of Le Barque, when it was discovered that the Germans were withdrawing from the front line. Along with the rest of the 3rd Brigade, the 9th Battalion was soon advancing towards the village, striking isolated pockets of resistance. After this, the battalion followed up the Germans as they withdrew towards the multi-layered Hindenburg Line of fortifications. In mid-April, parts of the 9th Battalion were in the thick of the fighting against a major German counter-attack at Lagnicourt.

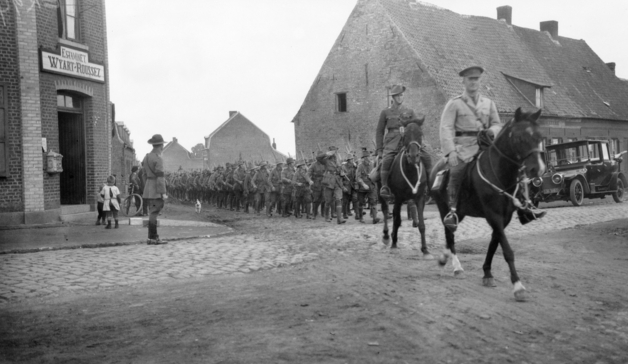
Wilder-Neligan (on horseback in front) leading his battalion through Hazebrouck on 10 August 1917

Wilder-Neligan was in temporary command of his battalion during the Second Battle of Bullecourt in May 1917, part of the Battle of Arras. For the attack on the German trenches known as O.G. 1 and O.G. 2, the 9th Battalion was placed under the command of the 1st Brigade. Before the attack, he arranged for his men to create dumps of barbed wire, stakes, hand grenades and other equipment and tools near to the battalion assembly point for the attack. He ensured that telephone lines were laid as far forward as possible, then briefed his company commanders and supporting units. Fierce bomb fights occurred in both objective trenches as soon as the 9th Battalion attacked, but the Queenslanders gradually pushed the Germans back. A heavy German barrage then fell on the captured trenches. During the battle, the unit suffered 160 casualties, mainly from bombs. For his actions at Bullecourt, Wilder-Neligan was recommended for the Belgian Order of the Crown, although there is no record of an appointment to the order. For other brief periods in the first half of 1917 he was acting commanding officer of the 9th Battalion.

On 23 June 1917, he was temporarily placed in command of his battalion's South Australian-raised sister unit of the 3rd Brigade, the 10th Battalion. After briefly returning to his old unit on 6 July, he took command of the 10th Battalion with the rank of lieutenant colonel on 15 July. This was considered a surprising promotion, as at the time he was junior to forty majors then in the AIF.

==== 10th Battalion ====
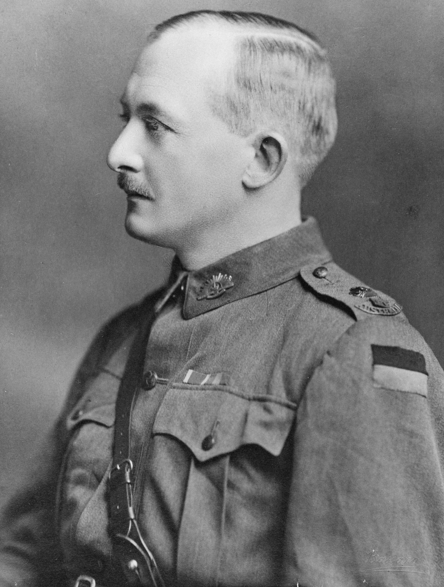
Portrait of Wilder-Neligan while he was commanding the 10th Battalion

Wilder-Neligan's first fight with his new battalion was the Battle of the Menin Road Ridge, which commenced on 20 September as part of the Battle of Passchendaele. In the initial planning for this offensive, the 10th Battalion was committed to the third phase of the attack by the 3rd Brigade. For this attack, Wilder-Neligan had split his command into two. The assault would be carried out by two specially trained "storm" companies, with his other two companies responsible for carrying forward ammunition and equipment and "mopping-up" pockets of resistance. During the move to the start line, the two carrying and "mopping-up" companies of the battalion were caught in a heavy and persistent German barrage, suffered significant casualties and became disorganised. Wilder-Neligan sent back his adjutant to re-organise them, and they came through the German shell fire to their assembly positions.

Although initially intended as the third wave of the brigade attack, the second wave 12th Battalion had moved to the left as a result of the German barrage, and the 10th effectively joined the second wave on its right. The 10th had also moved forward to avoid the heavy barrage, and had become intermingled with the first wave formed by the 11th Battalion. When a machine gun in a pillbox held up the leading troops, Wilder-Neligan sent one of his "storm" platoons to outflank the German position. When the platoon commander was killed, the South Australians "went mad" according to Wilder-Neligan, killing rather than capturing most of the German garrison. When the first objective was reached, Wilder-Neligan had his battalion fill the gap in the line to the right of the 12th Battalion. As soon as the two carrying and "mopping-up" companies reached the second objective, Wilder-Neligan left them there to dig in. During a pause in the battle while his two "storm" companies were waiting to go forward to the third objective, Wilder-Neligan had specially procured copies of the Daily Mirror and Daily Mail newspapers distributed for his men to read. With the help of the heavy creeping barrage, the third objective was quickly taken. During the battle, the unit suffered 207 casualties. On the day following the battle, he was billed by a London newspaper as "The Eccentric Colonel", due to his distribution of newspapers to his waiting troops.

Wilder-Neligan was on leave from 25 September to 8 October. The day after he returned, the battalion conducted a raid in force of German positions in Celtic Wood near Passchendaele, part of the Battle of Poelcappelle. The operation was a disaster, largely due to the poor artillery support provided. Of the 85 troops involved, most were killed or wounded. Wilder-Neligan was mentioned in despatches for the third time in November. The recommendation cited his "clever organisation, untiring energy, zeal and exemplary bravery" between February and September 1917, and highlighted his leadership at Bullecourt. The 10th Battalion rotated through front line, reserve and rest areas throughout the winter of 1917/1918.

Wilder-Neligan sprained his ankle on 11 January, and was away from his unit for a week. He was away for another week in late January. On 11 February he went on leave, but did not return until 20 May, as he was temporarily commanding his old battalion from 30 March until that date. Wilder-Neligan was mentioned in despatches for the fourth time on 7 April. While he was commanding the 9th Battalion, it participated in the 3rd Brigade's abortive attempt to capture Méteren on 24 April. On 30 May, the 10th Battalion conducted a successful operation to capture several German posts forward of the line near Merris, suffering 64 casualties. After achieving its objectives, the battalion fought off two German counter-attacks. An innovation employed by Wilder-Neligan during this operation was a battery of rifle grenadiers formed from cooks and other headquarters staff, who provided close support to the assaulting troops. The battalion was congratulated by the army corps, division and brigade commanders for its work.

In June, Wilder-Neligan was appointed a Companion of the Order of St Michael and St George for his work as commanding officer of the 10th Battalion from September 1917 to February 1918. On 28 June, he was sick with influenza but still on duty when an opportunity for "peaceful penetration" of the German trenches arose. Directed to conduct a demonstration in front of Merris, where the 10th Battalion held the front line, Wilder-Neligan took advantage of the accompanying barrage to encourage his two line companies to capture advanced German posts. He reinforced their initial success by ordering that both companies continue their advance, and simultaneously brought up most of his support and reserve companies to assist. The advance was covered by a smoke barrage laid down by trench mortars and rifle grenades. Wilder-Neligan's close coordination of an artillery barrage behind the German posts helped the battalion push even further forward. By the end of the day, the 10th Battalion had captured 500 yards (460 m) of German line, along with 35 prisoners, six machine guns and two trench mortars, for the loss of about 50 casualties. His job done, Wilder-Neligan then reported sick. This time, the battalion received congratulations from the army and army corps commanders.

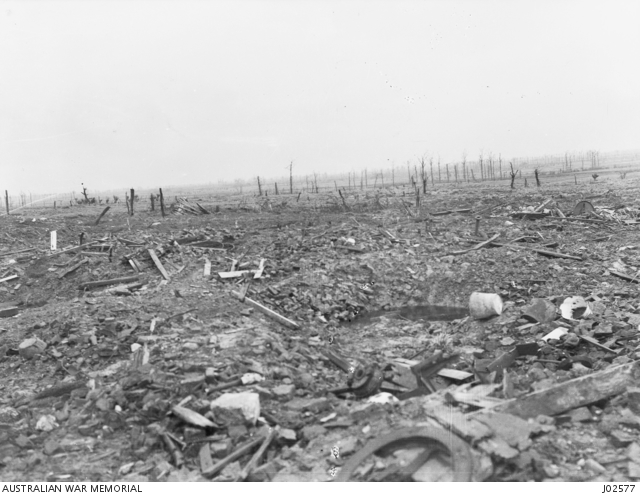
The remains of the village of Merris, captured by the 10th Battalion on the night of 29 July 1918

Wilder-Neligan returned to duty on 7 July. On 22–23 July, the 10th Battalion was back in the line opposite Merris. Characteristically, on his own initiative, Wilder-Neligan pushed strong patrols forward on his flanks in an effort to envelop the village. He had achieved some success, and believed that the capture of the village was imminent when a heavy German barrage descended on the battalion outpost line. The new divisional commander, Major General William Glasgow, now became aware of Wilder-Neligan's operation, and, as Wilder-Neligan could not guarantee communication with his flanking patrols due to the barrage, Glasgow ordered the 10th Battalion to withdraw. In his report on the operation, Wilder-Neligan noted that between 60 and 70 Germans had been killed and four prisoners taken, for the loss of two killed and seven wounded. Regarding this operation, he reported that, "the ultimate withdrawal in obedience to the order of the Divisional Commander in no way mitigated its success".

A week later, he was given the opportunity to prove the wisdom of his plan to capture Merris. On the night of 29 July, under cover of a precisely planned creeping barrage that worked its way through Merris and 1,000 yards (910 m) beyond it, he sent two companies, totalling about 180 men, on converging lines of attack from the northeast and southwest of the village. After an hour of carefully coordinated artillery, machine gun and trench mortar support, he sent his headquarters platoon into the shattered village to "mop-up" any remaining resistance. At its conclusion, the operation had captured the village, surrounding it with a series of strongly held posts, and had captured 188 Germans for the loss of 35 casualties, only four of whom were killed. Hill states that the capture of Merris was "perhaps [Wilder-Neligan's] greatest achievement".

The inspector general of training for the British Expeditionary Force described the capture of Merris as "the best show ever done by a battalion in France". Wilder-Neligan was awarded a bar to his Distinguished Service Order for this "innovative and daring operation". The citation read: (Note: The Australian casualty figures in this citation were superseded by records obtained later.)

For conspicuous gallantry during a night attack on a village. Owing to his skill and courage, the plan of enveloping the village was successfully carried out, resulting in the capture of 200 prisoners and 30 machine guns. The attacking force suffered less than 20 casualties.

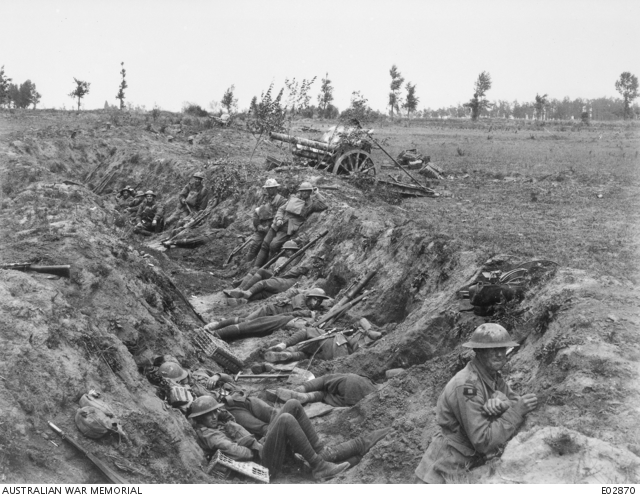
Troops of the 10th Battalion during the capture of Lihons

In August, Wilder-Neligan led his battalion during the early fighting of the Hundred Days Offensive, which began on 8 August 1918 with the Battle of Amiens. During the fighting for Lihons on 10 August, he brought his battalion up into close support using an unconventional method. He moved 250 yards (230 m) forward of his unit, carrying a signalling lamp on his back, using it to transmit orders to his unit to halt or advance. By this method he brought his battalion into a position from which it could support his old unit, the 9th, with only one casualty. From his advanced position, he could see that the flank of the 9th had been held up, and he sent his strongest company to assist in the capture of Crépey Wood.

On the following day, 9 August, Wilder-Neligan was placed in command of a force consisting of his own battalion and the 12th Battalion for the capture of Lihons itself. Despite heavy mist, he showed his clear grasp of the tactical situation when he realised that German counter-attacks were taking advantage of a gap between the forward troops, and quickly cleared it using supporting troops. During 10–14 August, the 10th Battalion suffered 123 casualties.

The 10th Battalion was back in action on 22–23 August as the Allied advance continued north of Proyart. The 10th Battalion was in a supporting role protecting the flank of the 1st Brigade. Wilder-Neligan visited the neighbouring battalion, and upon learning of some difficulties due to German positions in a wood, immediately deployed two companies to clear the area, and due to his initiative the advance was able to continue. The 10th Battalion continued in the advance towards the Hindenburg outpost line over the next few days before being relieved for a short period of training and rest. On 18 September, the battalion saw its last fighting of the war during the capture of the Hindenburg outpost line south of the village of Villeret. In heavy fighting, the unit captured the second and third objectives, and were then relieved and went into a period of training and rest. By this point, the battalion had been reduced to a strength of 517 men. On 10 October, Wilder-Neligan was awarded the French Croix de guerre. He was mentioned in despatches for the fifth and final time on 8 November. After the Armistice of 11 November, Wilder-Neligan remained with his battalion until 1 January 1919. He returned to Australia in July, arriving in Brisbane in September. For his service during the war, in addition to the decorations already mentioned, Wilder-Neligan was awarded the 1914–15 Star, British War Medal and Victory Medal.

Wilder-Neligan's clear tactical acumen was accompanied by relentless striving to ensure the needs of his men were met. According to Hill, "above all he was an organiser, some said the best in the AIF". Bean noted that he was "a restless and adventurous spirit", "an impetuous, daredevil officer, but free of the carelessness with which those qualities are often associated", "a gay, wild young Englishman, clever soldier, and inevitably a leader wherever he was", and a "mercurial commander".

He had many eccentric habits, and often embarrassed his officers through his actions. He would supervise battalion drill from horseback, armed with a megaphone, with which he would berate the officers incessantly, causing much confusion. On one occasion he even chased the officers off the parade square to show his displeasure with their efforts. He was known by the nicknames "Mad Wilder", "Wily Wilder", and "Mad Neligan". Nevertheless, he was admired and trusted by his men. He was the most highly decorated officer to command the 10th Battalion during the war.

== New Guinea and death ==
In accordance with normal repatriation procedures, Wilder-Neligan's commission in the AIF was terminated following his return to Australia in October 1919. He was involved in the formation of a soldiers' political party in Queensland, travelling the country and delivering speeches from the back of a truck. On 1 January 1920 he was appointed as a lieutenant colonel in the part-time army, the Citizens' Forces. In late March the following year he transferred to the Australian Naval and Military Expeditionary Force, which was then occupying German New Guinea. This appointment was at the rank of lieutenant. He did not immediately travel to New Guinea, living on the north coast of Queensland for two months, and visiting Brisbane in early May to receive his French Croix de guerre from the former AIF commander Field Marshal Sir William Birdwood during the latter's first visit to Australia. Wilder-Neligan travelled to New Guinea later that year to take up his appointment.

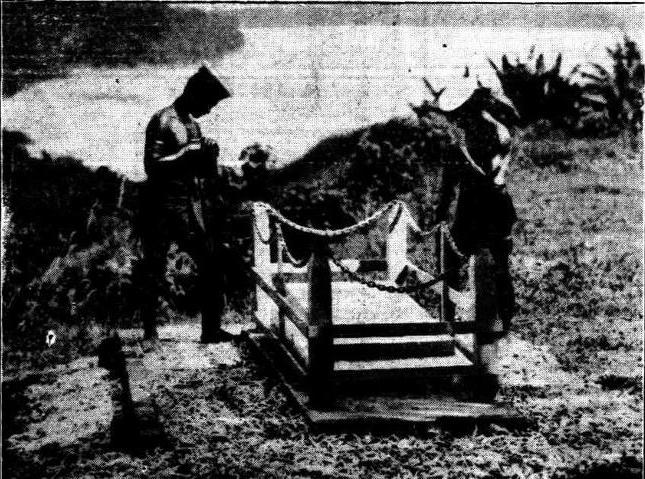
Wilder-Neligan's grave on Garua Island, New Guinea

Wilder-Neligan's initial role was as a deputy district officer for the garrison of Rabaul on the island of Neupommern (later renamed New Britain). In May 1921, when the military administration of the former German colony was handed over to an Australian civil one mandated by the League of Nations, he was transferred to the administration of the newly created Territory of New Guinea as district officer for Talasea in west New Britain. Early in January 1923, the Administrator, Evan Wisdom, summoned him to Rabaul to answer allegations of financial malpractice that had been made against him by a former German planter. It appears that he resigned and sailed for Rabaul. Going ashore to rest for a few days at the village of Ekerapi before continuing his journey, he died during the night of 9/10 January. Survived by his wife and daughter, he died intestate and with debts.

A coronial inquiry was conducted by the acting district officer in Talasea, which did not find a cause of death but concluded that there were no suspicious circumstances. It is believed that he died of complications from his war wounds. The men of the 10th Battalion AIF Club contacted his widow to ask that his remains be reinterred in the AIF Cemetery, Adelaide, South Australia, and offered their assistance, but she declined, choosing to have him remain buried on Garua Island in New Guinea. On 23 April 1927, a photograph of Wilder-Neligan's grave was published on the front page of the Adelaide newspaper, The Mail, along with a summary of his exploits during the war.
