= Merris =

- Commune
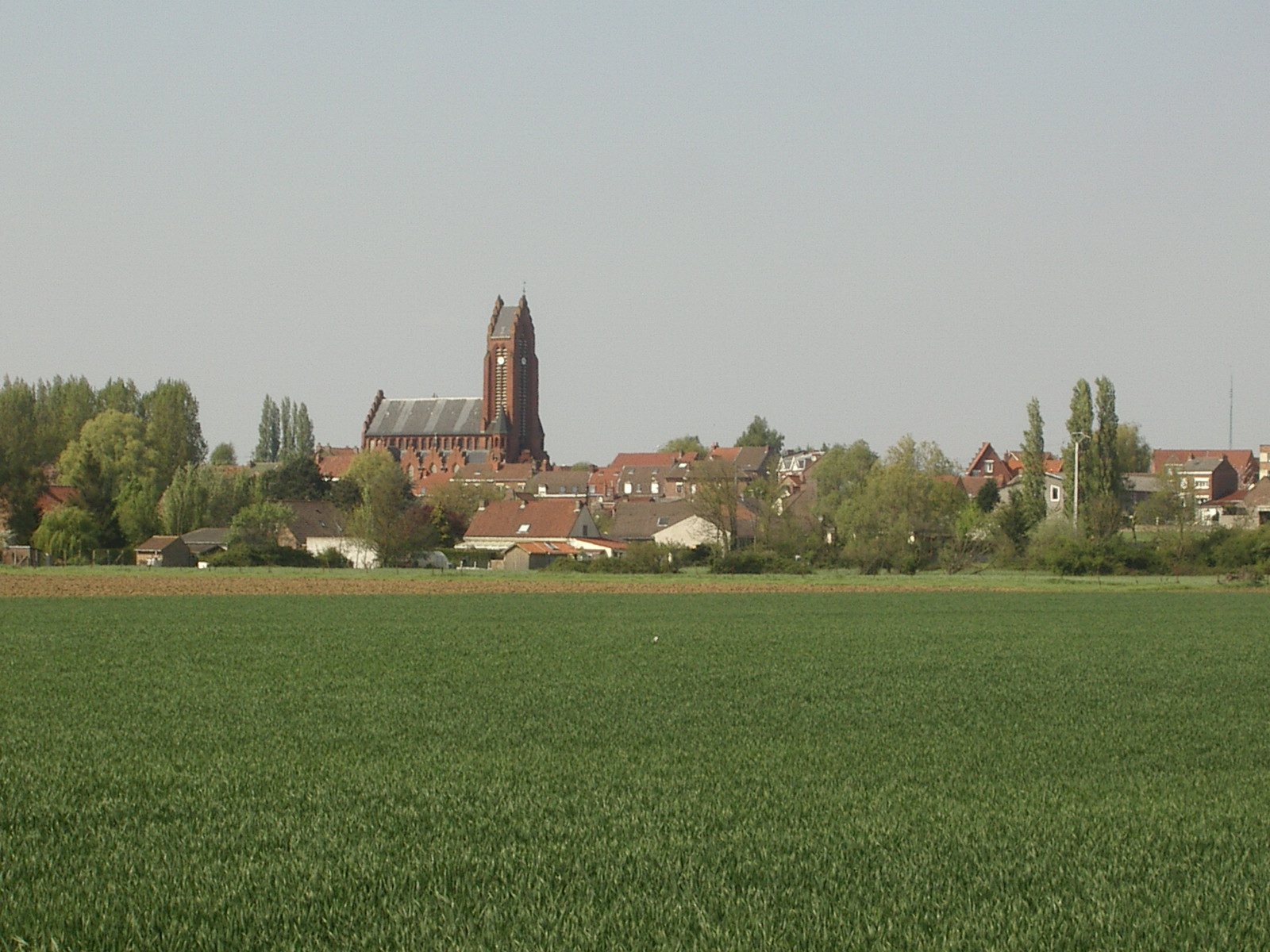
- A general view of Merris

- Coat of arms
- Location of Merris
- Location within France Location within Hauts-de-France
- Coordinates: 50°42′59″N 2°39′40″E
- Country: France
- Region: Hauts-de-France
- Department: Nord
- Arrondissement: Dunkerque
- Canton: Bailleul
- Intercommunality: CA Cœur de Flandre

Government
  - Mayor (2020–2026): Yves Delfolie
- Area^{1}: 10.09 km^{2} (3.90 sq mi)
- Elevation: 23 m (75 ft)
- Highest elevation: 61 m (200 ft)
- Lowest elevation: 18 m (59 ft)
- Population (2023): 1,106
  - Density: 109.6/km^{2} (283.9/sq mi)
- Demonym: Merrisiens(iennes)
- Time zone: UTC+01:00 (CET)
  - Summer (DST): UTC+02:00 (CEST)
- INSEE/Postal code: 59399 /59270
- ^{1} French Land Register data, which excludes lakes, ponds, glaciers > 1 km^{2} (0.386 sq mi or 247 acres) and river estuaries.

Merris (French pronunciation: [mɛʁis]) is a commune in the Nord department in northern France.

It is about 15 km (9.3 mi) west-northwest of Armentières, and about 20 km (12 mi) north of Béthune.

== Heraldry ==
Arms of Merris	The arms of Merris are blazoned : Argent, 3 horns sable tied gules. (Hardifort, Merris and Oudezeele use the same arms.)

== See also ==
- Communes of the Nord department
