= 10th (Service) Battalion, Queen's (Royal West Surrey Regiment) (Battersea) =

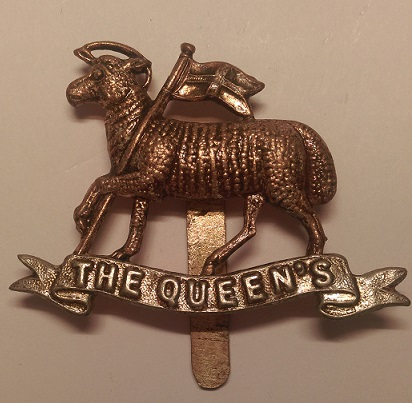
- Cap badge of the Queen's Regiment
- Active: 3 June 1915–6 March 1920
- Allegiance: United Kingdom
- Branch: New Army
- Type: Pals battalion
- Role: Infantry
- Size: One Battalion
- Part of: 41st Division
- Garrison/HQ: Battersea
- Nickname: The Battersea Battalion
- Patron: Mayor and Borough of Battersea
- Engagements: Battle of the Somme; Battle of Messines; Third Battle of Ypres; Italian Front; German spring offensive Hundred Days Offensive; Occupation of the Rhineland

Commanders
- Notable commanders: Lt-Col Roland Gwynne, DSO; Maj Hon Eric Thesiger; Lt-Col Robert Livesay, DSO

The 10th (Service) Battalion, Queens (Royal West Surrey Regiment) (Battersea) (10th Queen's) was an infantry unit recruited as part of 'Kitchener's Army' in World War I. It was raised in the summer of 1915 by the Mayor and Borough of Battersea in the suburbs of South London. It served on the Western Front from May 1916, taking part in the first tank action at Flers-Courcelette, then serving at Messines and Ypres. It was then sent to the Italian Front, before returning to France and defending against the German spring offensive. It next trained troops of the American Expeditionary Forces before taking part in the final advance to victory in Flanders. It served in the postwar Occupation of the Rhineland before being disbanded in 1920.

== Recruitment and training ==
Alfred Leete's recruitment poster for Kitchener's Army.

On 6 August 1914, less than 48 hours after Britain's declaration of war, Parliament sanctioned an increase of 500,000 men for the Regular British Army. The newly appointed Secretary of State for War, Earl Kitchener of Khartoum, issued his famous call to arms: 'Your King and Country Need You', urging the first 100,000 volunteers to come forward. Men flooded into the recruiting offices and the 'first hundred thousand' were enlisted within days. This group of six divisions with supporting arms became known as Kitchener's First New Army, or 'K1'. The K2, K3 and K4 battalions, brigades and divisions followed soon afterwards. But the flood of volunteers overwhelmed the ability of the Army to absorb them, and the K5 units were largely raised by local initiative rather than at regimental depots, often from men from particular localities or backgrounds who wished to serve together: these were known as 'Pals battalions'. The 'Pals' phenomenon quickly spread across the country, as local recruiting committees offered complete units to the War Office (WO). Encouraged by this response, in February 1915 Kitchener approached the 28 Metropolitan Borough Councils in the County of London, and the 'Great Metropolitan Recruiting Campaign' went ahead in April, with each mayor asked to raise a unit of local men.

The Metropolitan Borough of Battersea in South London already hosted the 23rd (County of London) Battalion, London Regiment, a pre-war Territorial Force (TF) unit with its drill hall at St John's Hill. This unit had quickly expanded to two battalions after the outbreak of war and it had just begun recruiting a third battalion, while the employees of a major local employer, Price's Candles, had volunteered to form a company of the 3rd (City of London) Battalion, London Regiment, and the Royal Irish Rifles was advertising in the borough for men of Irish origin. The mayor of Battersea, Councillor T.W. Simmons, considered that it would be difficult to recruit another large unit in the borough, and suggested that it should aim for an artillery battery of 133 men. However, the neighbouring Metropolitan Borough of Wandsworth agreed to support the raising of a full infantry battalion of 1350 men, and consequent newspaper criticism of Battersea's proposal, coupled with local rivalry, led to Battersea revising its plans. The 10th (Service) Battalion, Queens (Royal West Surrey Regiment) (Battersea) was authorised by the WO on 3 June 1915. (The Queen's Regiment was the Regular Army regiment covering South London, the pre-war London Regiment consisting entirely of part-time soldiers of the TF; Wandsworth had chosen to affiliate its battalion to the East Surrey Regiment.)

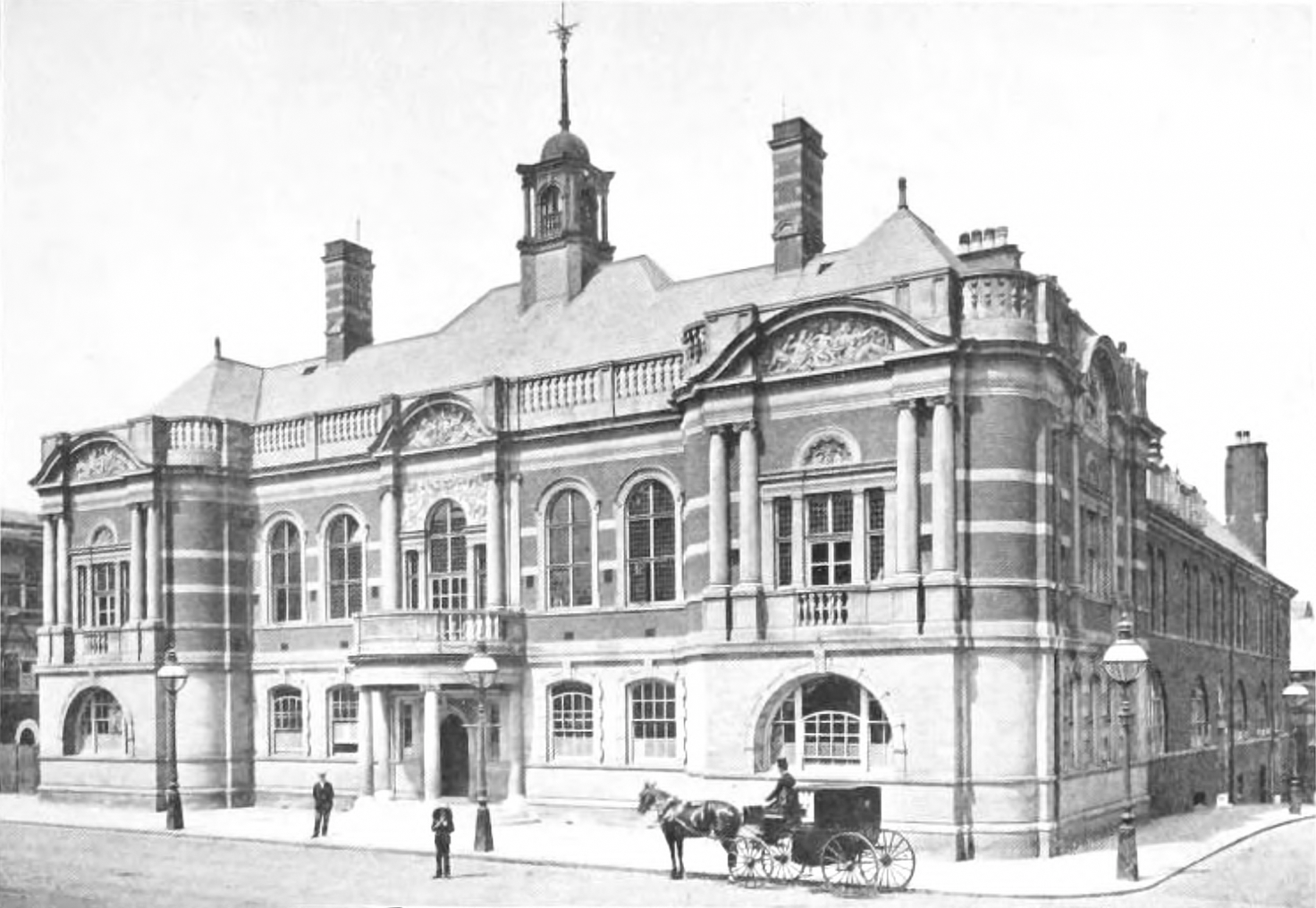
Battersea Town Hall, the battalion's first HQ.

The Lower Hall of Battersea Town Hall was designated as the new unit's battalion headquarters (HQ) and Colonel William Inglis was appointed its commanding officer. Inglis, a retired former officer of the Queen's, had rejoined the army at the outbreak of war and had been Inspector of Recruiting for Eastern Command. Major Talbot Jarvis, a TF Reserve officer, was later appointed as his second-in-command. Three Battersea councillors took up commissions in the battalion, but as the mayor had feared, recruiting was weak: by the end of June only 50 men had volunteered. This was despite a committee of ladies handing out facsimile railway tickets to Berlin (rather than the traditional white feathers of cowardice) to men who were not in uniform. Simmons and Inglis obtained a number of local men who had been commissioned as officers after seeing service on the Western Front or at Gallipoli and others with previous TF experience. Battersea Council provided Latchmere Road Baths as a drill hall, while outdoor drill was carried out in Battersea Park and on Clapham Common. Recruiting continued slow until December, when the government announced the introduction of conscription, and there was a late rush of men wishing to volunteer for a specific unit rather than be drafted.

== Training ==
At New Year 1916 the WO formally took over the battalion from the borough council, and ordered it to Albuhera Barracks, Aldershot, to join 41st Division, the last 'K' division to be formed. It was assigned to 124th Brigade, serving alongside the 26th (Bankers) and 32nd (East Ham) Battalions of the Royal Fusiliers (City of London Regiment) (RF) and the 21st King's Royal Rifle Corps (Yeoman Rifles) (KRRC), recruited from North Country farmers. At Aldershot the battalions were equipped with modern rifles, specialists such as Lewis gunners, signallers and 'bombers' were selected and trained, and route marches were carried out in full marching order. Unfit personnel were withdrawn to second-line units, including Col Inglis who left to command the newly formed 33rd (Labour) Battalion, Royal Fusiliers, at Seaford but died on 30 March 1916, aged 53. He was replaced by Lieutenant-Colonel Richard Oakley, a former Regular officer of the Cameronians (Scottish Rifles). Some other trained replacements came from the 3rd (Reserve) Battalion, Queen's, at Sittingbourne, and 300 from 8th (Reserve) Battalion), Northamptonshire Regiment at Colchester. In February the whole of 41st Division concentrated at Aldershot and began its final battle training.

On 5 May 10th Queen's boarded three trains for Southampton Docks, where the men embarked on the transport Hunscraft and landed at Le Havre in France the following morning. On 7 May the battalion went by train to Steenbecque and then marched to billets at Ebblinghem, later moving to Outtersteene in the division's concentration area west of Bailleul in Second Army's area. Here it resumed training until the end of the month.

=== 12th (Reserve) Battalion ===
The 12th (Reserve) Battalion, Queen's, was formed by Maj S.B. Schlam of the South African Defence Force at Coldharbour Lane, Brixton, in October 1915 from the depot companies of 10th (Battersea) and 11th (Lambeth) Bns Queen's as a Local Reserve battalion to supply reinforcement drafts to the two battalions. It went to Northampton, where Lt-Col W.D. Wynyard (Army Ordnance Corps) assumed command, and it joined 23rd Reserve Brigade. In May 1916 the brigade moved to Aldershot. On 1 September 1916 the Local Reserve battalions were transferred to the Training Reserve (TR) and 12th (R) Bn Queen's became 97th Training Reserve Battalion, though the training staff retained their Queen's cap badges. It was still in 23rd Reserve Brigade. On 4 July 1917 it was redesignated as 209th (Infantry) Battalion, TR, and on 1 November it was transferred to become 51st (Graduated) Battalion, Middlesex Regiment in 193rd Bde of 64th Division at Taverham in Norfolk. It went to Norwich for winter quarters, then in March 1918 to Sheringham, before returning to Taverham. In November 1918 it went back to Norwich. After the Armistice with Germany it was converted into a service battalion on 8 February 1919 and was then sent to join the British Army of the Rhine, where it was absorbed into 7th Bn, Middlesex Regiment, on 8 April.

== Service ==
On 30 May 10th Queen's marched to Steenwerck, and the following day moved into billets in Ploegsteert ('Plugstreet'). Although the battalion was in divisional reserve, it had to supply working parties to improve the trenches near Ploegsteert Wood, and it began to suffer a trickle of casualties from chance shellfire or random machine gun fire. These increased after 4 June when the battalion began its first tour of duty in the Ploegsteert Wood trenches. Towards the end of the month volunteers were called for to undertake a raid on enemy lines. Five officers and about 150 other ranks (ORs) were selected from among the volunteers and sent by motor bus to Bailleul to train over specially prepared ground. The raid was carried out on the night of 27 July and was tolerably successful, but costly: 4 of the officers were wounded, 6 ORs killed or died of wounds, 37 wounded and 7 missing.

=== Flers–Courcelette ===
When 41st Division arrived on the Western Front the British Expeditionary Force was preparing for that summer's 'Big Push', the Battle of the Somme, which began on 1 July. On 23 August 10th Queen's entrained for Pont-Remy in the Somme sector, where it undertook three weeks' special training at Buigny-l'Abbé before being called upon to participate in the offensive, at the Battle of Flers-Courcelette. The training included operating in a wood similar to the notorious Delville Wood on the Somme. On the afternoon of 14 September the brigade was guided to trenches north-east of Delville Wood, where orders were issued for an attack next day. 124th Brigade on the division's right formed up during the night, with 10th Queen's (right) and 21st KRRC (left) in eight waves, the leading waves in No man's land, the others stretching back to 'Brown Trench'. They were supported by 26th and 32nd RF respectively. The division had four objectives and the brigade was intended to take them in succession with the battalions in this formation, until they were beyond the village of Gueudecourt. For this its first attack, 41st Division had support from tanks, also making their first ever appearance on a battlefield. Ten Mark I tanks of D Company, Heavy Section, Machine Gun Corps, were assigned to the division, formed up behind the infantry.

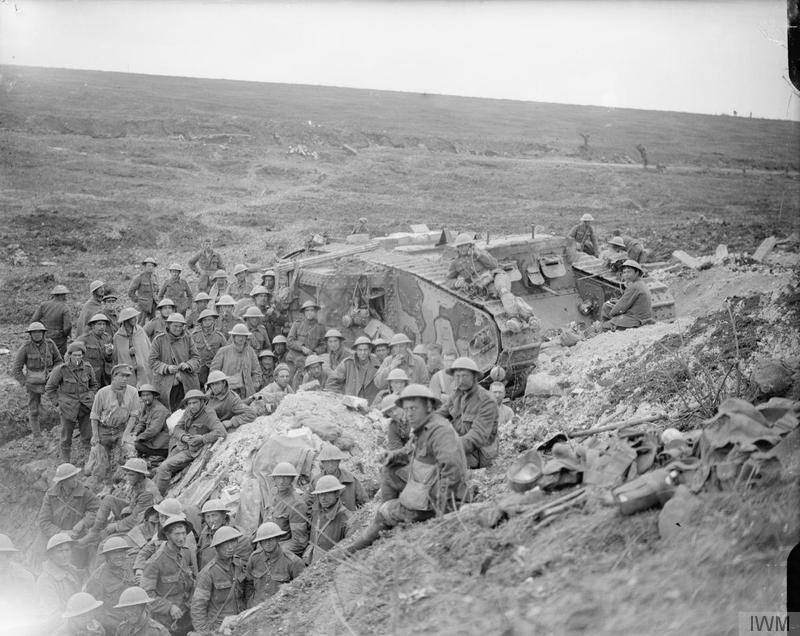
D17, one of the tanks supporting 41st Division, broken down on its return from Flers after the battle (photographed by Ernest Brooks).

The brigade moved forward at 06.20, following a Creeping barrage, the leading wave in extended order, those following in shallow columns. Seven tanks managed to cross the start line, and there was little resistance in the German front trench – 'Tea Support Trench' – which had been shattered by the 3-day British bombardment. Many of the surviving Germans ran from the tanks, though several machine gun teams stuck to their task and caused heavy casualties to the leading waves. By about 06.45 the first objective – 'Switch Trench' – had been captured, the infantry arriving about two minutes after the tanks. Leaving a party to consolidate this line and to construct a strongpoint, 10th Queen's, 21st KRRC and the tanks moved on towards the second objective – 'Flers Trench' – closely followed by the two RF battalions. Uncut barbed wire held them up, but this was crushed by two of the tanks. The second objective was secured by 08.50., but 124th Bde had got ahead of its neighbours, and it became difficult to sustain the advance because of the lack of flank support. The Earl of Feversham, CO of 21st KRRC, and Lt-Col Oakley of 10th Queen's now led parties of their men forward towards the third and fourth objectives, but casualties were heavy, particularly from enemy shellfire. They reached the next objective in front of Gueudecourt village – 'Gird Tench' – and withstood a number of counter-attacks, but Lord Feversham was killed. In the end Lt-Col Oakley led this isolated party of the two battalions back to a line about 400 yards (370 m) in front of the second objective, before he was seriously wounded himself. (Future Prime Minister Anthony Eden, at the time an officer in 21st KRRC, later claimed that this fruitless final attack had been due to Feversham receiving a 'deplorably vague' message from 41st Division.) Between 17.00 and 18.00 the weak groups on this line were able to repulse with rapid fire two German counter-attacks made 'in splendid order but without a covering barrage'.

In this its first general action, 10th Queen's had lost 5 officers (including the adjutant) and 26 ORs killed or died of wounds, 13 officers (including Lt-Col Oakley and the Medical Officer) and 211 ORs wounded, and 66 ORs missing. The second-in-command, Maj Talbot Jarvis, assumed command, and the battalion went back to the support line on 17 September before it was relieved two days later. It went to bivouacs at Dernancourt and resumed training. 10th Queen's received two large drafts of reinforcements, one 100-strong of dismounted yeomen from C Squadron, 1/1st Surrey Yeomanry, which had served at Gallipoli and was now part of III Corps Cavalry Regiment, and another dismounted party from 2/1st Sussex Yeomanry, a reserve cyclist unit in England, led by Maj Roland Gwynne.

=== Transloy Ridges ===
On the night of 3/4 October 41st Division relieved the New Zealand Division, which had launched the Battle of the Transloy Ridges. On 7 October 122nd and 124th Bdes continued the operation. This time the two Royal Fusiliers battalions led 124th Bde's attack, with 21st KRRC in support and 10th Queen's in reserve. A and D Companies of 10th Queen's were in 'Gird Trench', with orders to move up and occupy the positions of 21st KRRC when that battalion went forward. The two RF battalions were held up by unsuppressed machine guns when they were halfway to their objective of 'Bayonet Trench', 21st KRRC reinforced them, and D Company 10th Queen's was ordered up to assist, while B and C Companies moved up from 'Factory Trench' to 'Gird Support Trench'. Communications became difficult, with messages from the front line taking five hours to reach Brigade HQ and orders being equally delayed. D Company was rumoured to have been wiped out, which was not the case, albeit its casualties were very heavy: 1 officer and 9 ORs killed, 3 officers and 71 ORs wounded, and 7 ORs missing. That night the whole brigade in the front line mustered only the equivalent of a single battalion. Major Jarvis had been wounded at about 14.00, and the adjutant, Lt Leslie Andrews, assumed command until Maj Clarke of the Royal Fusiliers arrived on the morning of 8 October to take over and lead the battalion back to Bécordel, east of Albert. According to Eden, Jarvis gained an 'almost legendary reputation for courage during the Somme battles'. He had been standing at the top of the steps at 'Factory Corner' when a shell burst overhead and he was hit over the heart by a piece of shrapnel. Helped to his feet, he found the shrapnel embedded in a sheaf of papers in his tunic pocket, which saved him from a fatal wound. He allowed himself to be evacuated that evening, but returned to the battalion later in the month and was promoted to Lt-Col to take permanent command.

On 13 October 10th Queen's began a series of moves as 41st Division went north to a quiet sector on the southern edge of the Ypres Salient under Second Army once more. Here it established a routine of alternating with 32nd RF: six days in the line, six in support at Ridge Wood, six more in the line, and then six in the muddy 'Murrumbridge Camp' at La Clytte, where it trained and provided working parties. The area was so waterlogged that only shallow trenches could be used, with built-up parapets that required constant maintenance during the harsh winter. On 28 January 1917 Lt-Col Talbot Jarvis left take command of 21st KRRC, and Lt-Col Oakley returned to command 10th Queen's on 3 February, having recovered from his wound. Other wounded returned to the battalion, which also received another 70-strong draft from the Sussex Yeomanry. Another replacement was 2nd Lt James Parkes, who had been commissioned from the Artists Rifles. There was intermittent shelling – Battalion HQ was hit on 5 January, with 6 killed and 14 wounded – and raiding by both sides. In February the battalion took part in a large daylight raid on the Hollandscheschuur Salient. It involved the battalion's entire fighting strength of 17 officers and 525 ORs under the second-in-command, Maj Gwynne, along with a section of Royal Engineers (REs) and a party from an RE Tunnelling Company. The objective was to take prisoners, inflict casualties, and destroy dugouts and defences. Training for the operation in reserve positions had begun on 17 February. It was launched in the late afternoon of 24 February and within half an hour had penetrated to the German support line, where the engineers set about destroying the dugouts. Four concrete machine guns posts were dealt with, with one of the guns brought back. At 18.30 the German retaliatory artillery fire became intense but was suppressed by the British artillery. After 90 minutes the raiders came back with 1 German officer and 54 ORs as prisoners. The battalion was congratulated on a highly successful operation, but the casualties had been high: 2 officers and 26 ORs killed or died of wounds, two officers and 91 ORs wounded, and 11 missing. Among other awards to the raiders Maj Gwynne received the Distinguished Service Order (DSO). The battalion returned to the routine of trench holding and training.

=== Messines ===
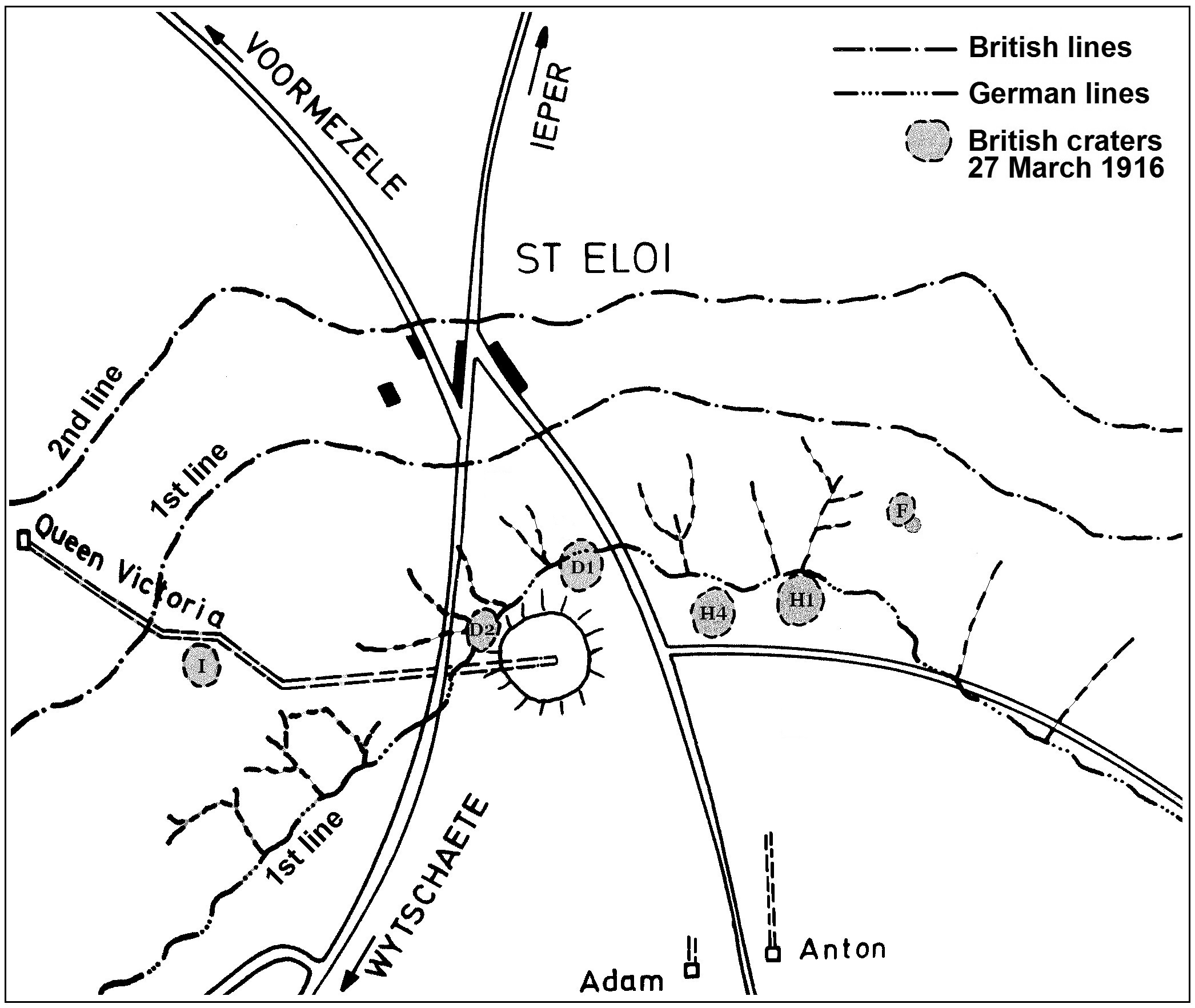
The St Eloi mine of 7 June 1917.

In early 1917 Second Army was preparing for the Battle of Messines. The object of this attack was to capture the Wytschaete–Messines Ridge with its fine observation positions over the British line. In the weeks before the battle units were withdrawn for careful rehearsals behind the lines, and leaders down to platoon level were taken to see a large model of the ridge constructed at Scherpenberg. 10th Queen's went by train to Bayenghem near St Omer on 17 May for this training, returning to camp on 30 May. Meanwhile, working parties dug six lines of assembly trenches extending into No man's land, some as close as 150 yards (140 m) to the German sentry posts. A mass of heavy, medium and field artillery began systematic destruction of enemy strongpoints and batteries on 21 May and the bombardment became intense from 31 May. The area to be attacked was obvious to the enemy; however the surprise element was the line of 19 great mines dug under the ridge. 124th Brigade's role was to carry out a converging attack on the St Eloi salient after the mine under the head of the salient was fired. 10th Queen's formed up on the right of the brigade during the night of 6/7 June. Lieutenant-Col Oakley arranged to have gaps cut in the parapet of the front trench so that his men could go over the top without being silhouetted against the skyline.

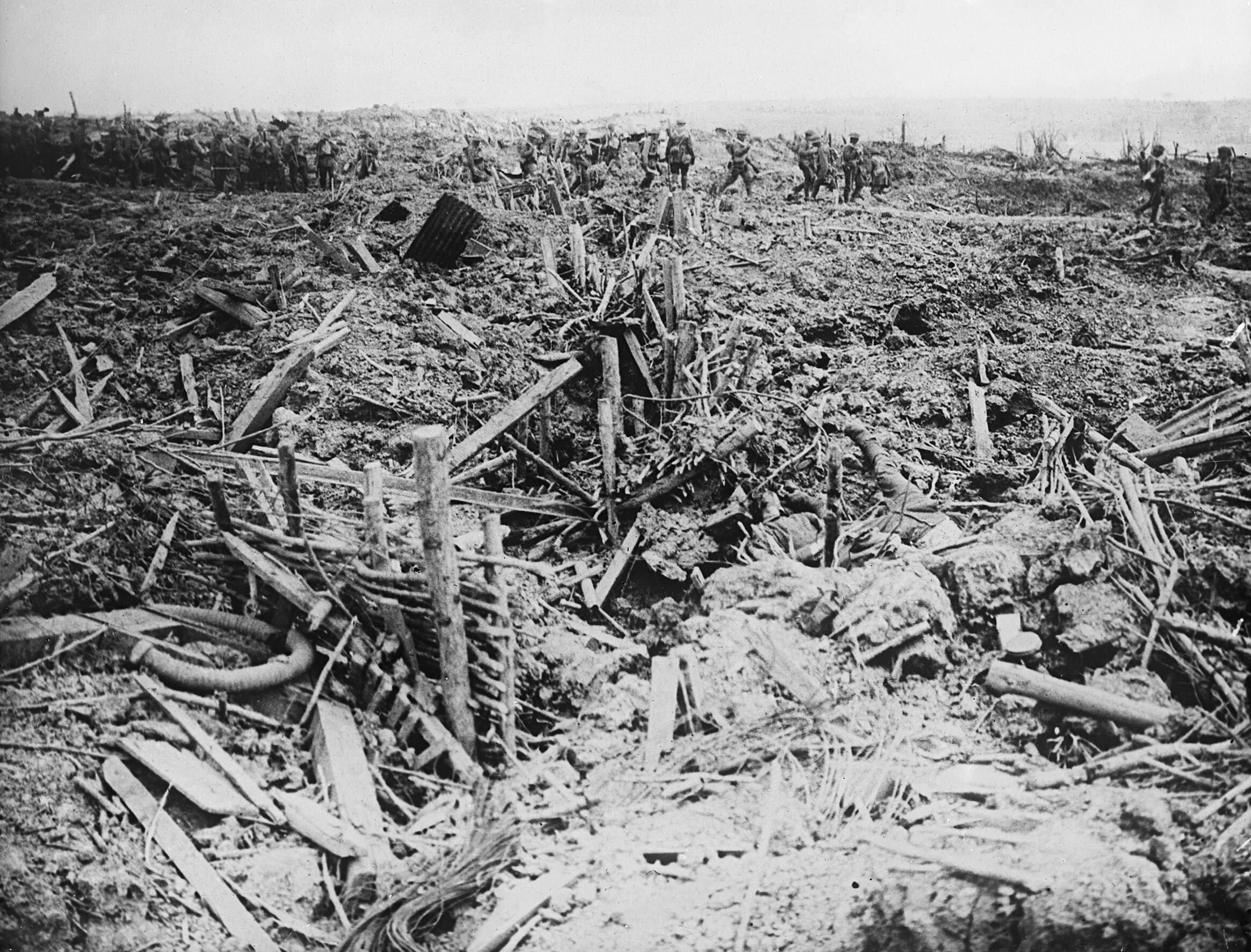
A smashed German trench on Messines Ridge, June 1917.

The mines were fired at 03.10 on 7 June. With 95,600 pounds (43,400 kg) of ammonal, the St Eloi mine was the largest fired that day and the resulting crater, some 17 feet (5.2 m) deep and 176 feet (54 m) wide, dwarfed all those from former tunnel warfare in the area and left the surroundings strewn with concrete blocks from shattered dugouts. After the mines exploded and the barrage came down the battalions advanced under bright moonlight, although the visibility became bad because of the smoke and dust from the mine explosions and barrage. 10th Queen's moved up the slope, following the creeping barrage of smoke and shrapnel shells that advanced at a rate of 100 feet (30 m) every two minutes. The German counter-barrage was weak, so many of their batteries having been knocked out over preceding days, and late, falling on the assembly trenches after the battalions had gone over the top. The German forward defences (the Red Line objective) were so shattered or stunned by the mine explosion that the first wave of riflemen had no difficulty rushing or outflanking the strongpoints and machine-gun nests; many defenders cowered in their dugouts and were dealt with by the 'moppers-up' of succeeding waves. 10th Queen's was soon in its Red Line objective of `Oaten Wood. After a two-hour halt for reorganisation and further bombardment, the battalions advanced rapidly to the final Black Line objective and opened fire on German infantry and artillery retreating down the other side of the ridge. The brigade's work for the day was over by 08.10, other than consolidating the positions they had won, against a counter-attack that never materialised. 10th Queen's had gone into action with 626 men and only lost 7 killed, 36 wounded and 14 missing. After the battle, 10th Queens moved to the Méteren training area, where it received 158 reinforcements, and then back to La Clytte. Lieutenant-Col Oakley left to command a brigade, and Maj Gwynne was promoted to succeed him.

=== Ypres ===
On 30 July 41st Division returned to the line for the opening of the Flanders Offensive (the Third Battle of Ypres). This began next day with the Battle of Pilckem Ridge. Second Army had a minor role in covering the right flank of the main offensive by Fifth Army. 41st Division made an attack with limited objectives. 124th Brigade was the divisional reserve, and 10th Queen's was ordered to move up from the 'Bluff Tunnels' following the attackers to the Red Line, then for B and C Companies to 'mop up' between the Red and Blue Lines at 03.10. A and D Companies would then pass through at 04.30 and go on behind a Creeping barrage to capture and hold a spur on the Green Line. Things went wrong for the battalion from the start: no-one from 10th Queen's had been able to reconnoitre the open ground they were to pass over, and the only guide got lost. The head of the battalion only reached the Red Line at 04.30, and the rear was heavily shelled coming up, A Company becoming so disorganised that only 50 men under 2nd Lt Parkes got as far as Battle Wood. Lieutenant-Col Gwynne went forward at 04.40 to reconnoitre, to see if it would be possible to launch the attack on. the Green Line, even though they had missed the barrage. The front was covered by enemy machine guns and Gwynne was hit several times and seriously wounded. By 07.00 the battalion was pinned down, A Company in Battle Wood, C in shell holes and dugouts along the east side of the railway embankment, with B and D on the west side. 10th Queen's remained in these positions until nightfall, when the wounded Lt-Col Gwynne was brought in by stretcher-bearers. Major Leslie Andrews came up from the rear to take over command at 13.30, and brought the battalion out of action when it was relieved by 11th Queen's of 123rd Bde at 23.00. It went back into the line on the night of 3 August, but it was too muddy to dig trenches, the battalion forming an outpost line, covered by rifle and machine gun fire from the railway embankment behind, where a continuous trench could be dug. In driving rain and deepening mud the battalion held on, despite heavy shelling on 4 August and persistent counter-attacks on 5 August. It was finally relieved the following night, having lost 1 officer and 27 ORs killed, 3 officers and 130 ORs wounded, and 5 missing; 2nd Lt Parkes was evacuated having been temporarily blinded by Mustard gas. On 7 August Maj Francis Hayley Bell, who had been wounded at Flers, returned to the battalion and was promoted to acting lieutenant-colonel to take over command. The battalion was put into tents and billets in the Thieushoek area. On the evening of 18 August a German aircraft dropped a single bomb onto the crowded camp, killing or fatally wounding 45 ORs and wounding 1 officer and 62 ORs.

10th Queen's did not return to the line until the middle of September after a period of refitting and training, particularly in techniques for dealing with pillboxes. By then Second Army had taken the lead in Flanders, and the Battle of the Menin Road Ridge on 20 September was to give the offensive renewed impetus. The battalion practised on marked-out trenches before moving up from Ridge Wood Camp on the misty night of 19/20 September to take up its positions undetected on tapes laid out in No man's land. This time the attackers were shielded by several barrages of shells and machine gun fire, and a spell of dry weather had reduced the mud. 124th Brigade's objective was the 'Tower Hamlets' Spur, which meant crossing the difficult Bassevillebeek valley. 10th Queen's on the brigade's right led off at Zero (05.40) followed closely by 32nd RF, both battalions in close order to get clear before the enemy barrage came down. They only got about 50 yards (46 m) before they were caught by two machine guns, while still bunched up. This caused many casualties, particularly among the leading officers: Maj Andrews heading the battalion in the attack was killed. However, some parties worked round behind these machine guns and captured them. Despite its disorganisation 10th Queen's succeeded in reaching both its objectives, but the 32nd RF, also much reduced by casualties, could not continue the advance any further. Brigade HQ sent up Capt J. Wilson Hart to take command of the remnants of 10th Queen's, and he reorganised the battalion and dug in. 41st Division's attack was the only failure in an otherwise successful operation. 123rd Brigade attacked again next day, but even after heavy artillery bombardment a strongpoint on the spur still held out, and the troops had to resist later counter-attacks. The division was withdrawn on 22–24 September before the next attempt on Tower Hamlets.

On 27 September, 10th Queen's was reinforced by the rest of C Sqn 1/1st Surrey Yeomanry, III Corps Cavalry Regiment having been dismounted and retrained to provide infantry reinforcements. Major the Hon Eric Thesiger led the Surrey Yeomanry draft of 6 officers and 121 ORs and became the battalion's second-in-command under Lt-Col Hayley Bell, who had returned. Shortly afterwards Thesiger was transferred to the KRRC and was replaced as second-in-command by Maj R. Bonsor, also from the Surrey Yeomanry. 10th Queen's also received a draft from 2/5th Bn Buffs (East Kent Regiment), which like 2/5th Queens had been a reserve battalion in England; they were being broken up to reinforce the Western Front. By November the make-up of the 10th Queen's was very different from 1915:

- Original battalion – 196 men
- Sussex Yeomanry – 88
- Army Ordnance Corps draft – 42
- Surrey Yeomanry – 129
- 2/5th Bn, Queen's – 155
- 2/5th Bn, Buffs – 105
- Small drafts from 8 different battalions of the Queen's – 216
- Total– 931 men

41st Division was now sent to the Flanders Coast, with 10th Queen's at Ghyvelde. Here it reorganised, did spells in the coast defences, and provided large working parties for an RE tunnelling company and to repair the sandbagged trenches among the sand dunes. On 4 November it moved to Wormhout, where it continued its training.

=== Italy ===
On 7 November 1917 41st Division was informed that it was to be transferred to reinforce the Italian Front, and 10th Queen's entrained at Esquelbecq on 11/12 November. The division completed its concentration in the Mantua area by 18 November. 124th Brigade then undertook a five-day march of 120 miles (190 km) to take up positions between Vicenza and Grisgnano. The gruelling march was conducted in battle order with advanced guards and night outposts. On 1 December the brigade took over a sector of the front line along the River Piave around Nervesa, with 10th Queen's at Volpago del Montello in brigade reserve. It remained there for the rest of the month, under occasional shellfire and bombing. In January 1918 the battalions moved to the Montello sector, manning a steep hillside in very cold weather, where daylight movement was dangerous. In early February they moved to the slopes of Monte Grappa, with 10th Queen's overlooking the Piave, and then went into the front line along the river itself. At the end of the month the battalion went into billets around Limena. While there the division received orders to return to the Western Front. 10th Queen's entrained on 1 March and reached Mondicourt in the Somme sector on the night of 5/6 March, going into billets at Sus-Saint-Léger.

Here the battalion spent the rest of the month training: at the time barely 30 per cent of the specialists had been trained in their work. By the end of the month the battalion had a surplus of trained specialists, and all personnel had been on the rifle range, sometimes practising while wearing a gas mask. The BEF was suffering a manpower crisis in early 1918, and each infantry brigade was reduced from four to three battalions, the surplus units being disbanded and drafted to provide reinforcements. When 41st Division arrived from Italy it conformed to the new organisation, and 32nd RF and 21st KRRC were both disbanded (21st KRRC being replaced in 124th Bde by 20th Durham Light Infantry (Wearside)). 10th Queen's received a draft from 32nd RF on 18 March and Lt-Col W. Clarke of 32nd RF took over command of 10th Queen's again on 20 March, Francis Hayley Bell reverting to Major.

=== Spring offensive ===
On 21 March 10th Queen's boarded trains to go to the Senlis training area, but en route heard that the long-anticipated German spring offensive had begun that morning. The trains were redirected to Achiet-le-Grand where the battalion detrained and marched into Favreuil at 01.30 on 22 March. 41st Division moved up to reinforce Third Army's front, which was under intense pressure. During the night of 22/23 March 124th Bde went to the left sector of IV Corps, where a gap had been opening. It occupied the half-dug rear defences, the 'Green Line', and did much to improve the positions during the night. They were well-sited, mostly on a reverse slope, with a belt of old wire about 80 yards (73 m) in front. About 08.00 the following morning the enemy attacked in two strong waves from the direction of Vaulx-Vraucourt. These were repelled by rifle fire and a field artillery battery galloping up and firing over open sights. A small party of the enemy remained pinned down in the ruins of a cemetery by 10th Queen's Lewis gunners and snipers. At 11.00 the Germans tried again after a light barrage, but were stopped at the wire by rifle fire. After a while they managed to push two machine guns through the wire on D Company's front, and another in front of A Company, and set them up behind mounds about 100 yards (91 m) in front of the battalion. A Company also came under fire from rifle grenades launched from a sunken track. However all activity in front petered out until a final weak attack was made at 18.00 against D Company's barricade, apparently by dismounted cavalry, and this was dealt with by a Vickers gun of the divisional machine gun battalion. Unlike some sectors of the front, 124th Bde had succeeded in maintaining its positions on the Green Line intact all day. 10th Queen's and their neighbours, 20th DLI, made good use of their recent rifle practice, the Official History recording that the two battalions together poured half a million rounds of small arms ammunition into the enemy, and that the enemy dead lay in heaps in front of the wire. However, Lt-Col Clark had been wounded and Maj A.O.N.C. Chichester took over command of 10th Queen's.

The Germans put down a heavy bombardment at 01.30 on 24 March, and after two hours 10th Queen's was attacked on its front and its right, where neighbouring units had fallen back. The platoon on the right also fell back when the Germans were seen working their way round the battalion's flank. B Company then went back to the support line it had been in on 22 March. A Company held on a little longer, then reinforced by D Company it swung back to form a defensive flank. The Germans bombed their way up B Company's abandoned trench, pushing A Company away to the north west. Casualties were heavy, including Maj Chichester and two experienced company commanders wounded, and the adjutant, Capt A.R.I. Mellor, took command. Supported by 26th RF, 10th Queen's then counter-attacked and recovered its original trenches. 124th Brigade held the Green Line until about 19.00, covering the retreat of other brigades. However, by the late afternoon the whole position had deteriorated and 41st Division had withdrawn its right, pivoting on 124th Bde, which was now ordered to withdraw. 10th Queen's was badly depleted and scattered, but it was gathered together and dug in on a new line from Favreuil to Sapignies. However, the brigade was in front of the position intended, and a gap opened up to the next division. 41st Division sent its REs to fill this gap, then a further withdrawal was ordered early next morning (25 March). 10th Queen's took up a fresh line from Bihucourt to Achiet-le-Grand. On the night of 25/26 March 124th Bde was ordered to concentrate at Gommecourt; by 06.00 only 125 men of 10th Queen's had reported. They were given a hot meal and sent to man trenches south of the village. As the scattered men came in, the battalion was reorganised as three companies, each 113 strong. Every available man from the battalion transport lines was given a rifle and sent up to reinforce the battalion, but most were unable to reach it and were instead formed into a small emergency reserve. Apart from being machine-gunned by enemy aircraft, the line was unmolested on 26 March, and early next day the battalion was marched back to Bienvillers-au-Bois for rest. However, fighting continued along the line and 10th Queen's was called back at midday on 28 March to a position north-east of Gommecourt in the 'Purple Line'. In the afternoon of 29 March the enemy opened a bombardment on Gommecourt. 41st Division was ordered to relieve a battalion of 42nd (East Lancashire) Division, but this required virtually all the strength of the depleted 124th Bde. 10th Queen's was now reorganised as two composite companies, A Company attached to 26th RF and B Company to 20th DLI. On 31 March these two companies reverted to 10th Queen's, which took over 400 yards (370 m) of the centre of the brigade front. But the fighting had died down, the German offensive having failed. By now Maj Thesiger had returned to command the battalion. During the month it had lost (almost all in the last 10 days) 1 officer and 26 ORs killed, 11 officers and 145 ORs wounded, and 4 officers and 184 ORs missing. There had also been 93 evacuated sick and a few struck off strength for other reasons, so even with 117 reinforcements received, the battalion's strength at the end of the month was only 5 officers and 374 ORs present.

=== Ypres Salient ===
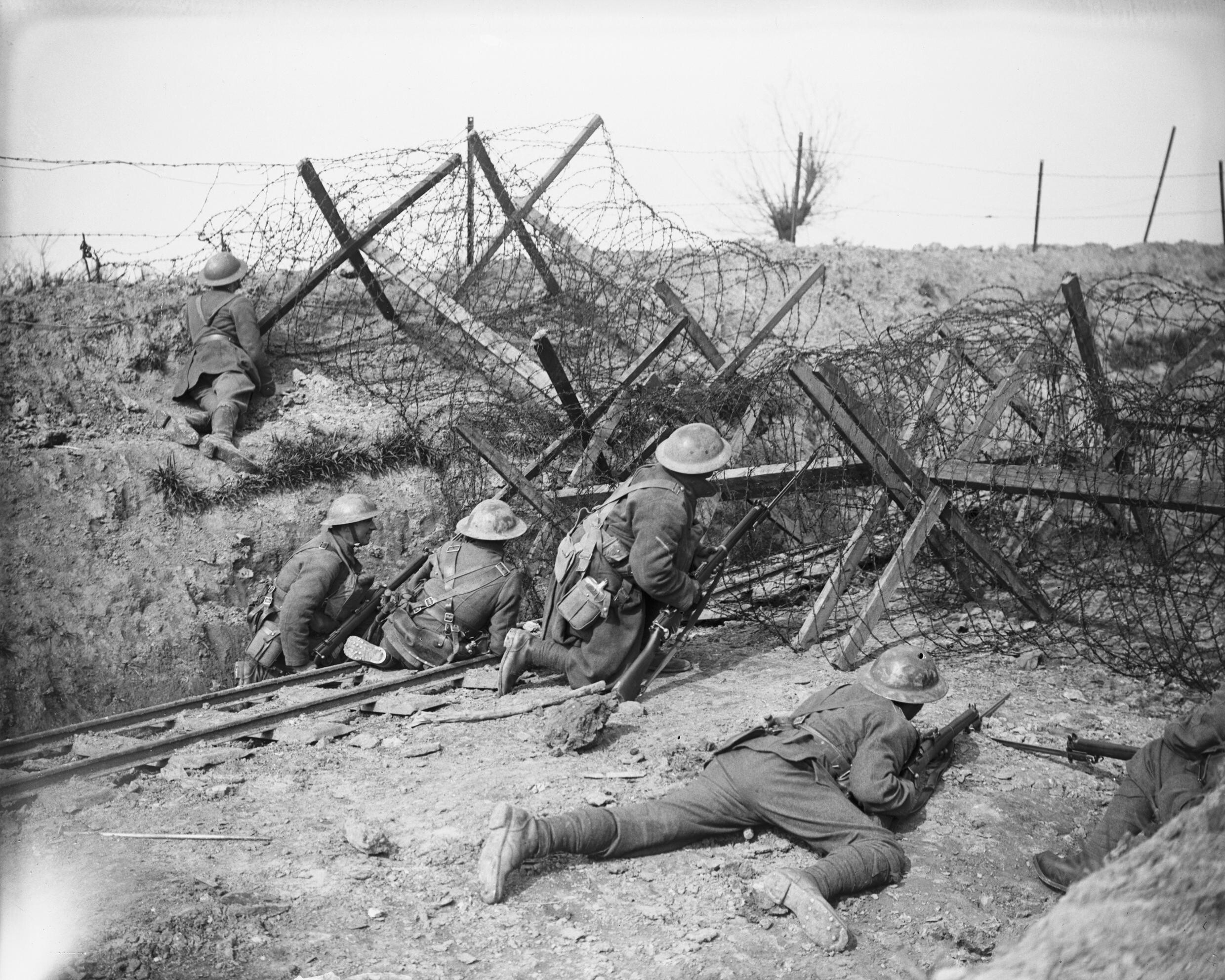
Officer and men of 10th Queen's manning a roadblock on the St Jean road outside Ypres, 29 April 1918 (photographed by John Warwick Brooke).

41st Division was finally relieved on the night of 1/2 April after 10 days' fighting, and was taken by motor bus to a rest area. It then moved north by marching and train to rejoin Second Army at Ypres, which was now considered a quiet area. On the night of 7/8 April 10th Queen's took over a series of outposts on a frontage of 1,200 yards (1,100 m) forming the front line in the Passchendaele sector, at the head of the salient that had been captured during the Third Battle of Ypres. The state of the ground was so bad that patrolling No man's land was almost impossible. Two days later the Germans launched the second phase of their Spring offensive (the Battle of the Lys) just south of Ypres. They made such rapid progress that by 13 April the position in the Passchendaele salient was critical. The defences were thinned out that night, 26th RF being pulled out and 10th Queen's taking over another 1,000 yards (910 m) with a thin line of outposts. Second Army was then ordered to evacuate the Passchendaele salient, and 10th Queen's withdrew at 02.00 on 16 April, the two companies in front each leaving six picked men to continue firing rifles and Verey lights until 03.30. The withdrawal was slow because of the shell holes and waterlogged ground, but the leading companies withdrew past the support company at Mosselmark, which covered the last stages. At 04.30 the Bellevue dugouts, Waterloo strongpoint and the bridge over the Steenbeck stream were demolished, and the battalion retired inside the new British line. The enemy had not discovered the withdrawal and the battalion suffered no casualties. It moved into Middlesex Camp just outside the Ypres ramparts, and took over responsibility for 1,200 yards (1,100 m) of the main line of resistance from the Sally Port to the St Jean road, with an outpost line about 1,000 yards (910 m) in front. The sector remained quiet apart from some shelling, including mustard gas shells, which caused some casualties. During the month 10th Queen's received reinforcements of 20 officers and 577 ORs, and on paper it was at almost full strength.

10th Queen's was relieved from the front line on 2/3 May and moved to Warrington Camp in divisional reserve, where it worked on the 'Brandhoek Line' defences until 11 May. It then began taking its turns manning the front line trenches east of Ypres until the end of the month, when it carried out some training for open warfare, and worked on the Green Line defences. In early June it moved to the Second Army Training Area at Volckerinckhove, where the training included route marches in full battle order, tactical schemes for Lewis gunners, rifle practice, rifle grenades, and open warfare training. On 27 June the battalion moved to Oudezeele, where 41st Division went into reserve for XIV French Corps. Here Lt-Col Edward North of the Royal Fusiliers arrived on 26 June to take command of 10th Queen's. 41st Division relieved a French division in the front line at the Scherpenberg. Following the fighting in April, the positions were no more than shallow rifle pits that were not linked up and were overlooked from Kemmel Hill, the high point of the German advance. German artillery was fairly active against these positions and there were a few casualties. Although the paper strength of the battalion had been 1072 ORs at the beginning of July, 113 who were held at divisional level were sent to the base for transfer to other units, and the strength at the end of the month fell to 38 officers and 924 ORs, with an actual trench strength of only 25 officers and 513 ORs. 27th US Division of the American Expeditionary Forces (AEF) was attached to Second Army for training, and on the night of 31 July/1 August 106th US Infantry Regiment took over part of 124th Bde's line for a tour of duty. 124th Brigade and the American troops undertook a number of raids on the enemy. On 10 August the 3rd Battalion of 106th Regiment and 10th Queen's were temporarily amalgamated and formed into two composite battalions, C and D, forming a small brigade under the command of Lt-Col North of 10th Queen's. That night the two composite battalions relieved 1st Bn 108th and 20th DLI in the front line. After a week the 108th took over the line in its own right and 10th Queen's became its support battalion.

=== Hundred Days offensive ===
The Allies had launched their counter-offensive further south with the Battle of Amiens on 8 August. On the evening of 30 August the Germans were seen to be shelling their own line in front of 41st Division, and 10th Queen's received information that the enemy on the right had withdrawn. It sent forward strong patrols, who found that those in its front had also retired. By early morning on 31 August the patrols had pushed past Kemmel Hill without meeting any resistance, and the whole battalion advanced, with HQ situated at 'Donegal Farm'. Another division then took up the pursuit, and 10th Queen's went to Dickebusch for rest and training.

The Allies launched a coordinated series of offensives on 26–29 September. Second Army's attack (the Fifth Battle of Ypres) began on 28 September. 10th Queen's moved up by bus and train to Brandhoek the day before, and marched up to the line at 06.30 for the attack. After a pause at 'Swan Chateau' it assembled in battle formation at Hill 60, with A and B Companies in front, C and D in reserve. Zero for 124th Bde was at 15.00, 10th Queen's advancing alongside 26th RF. Although there was no artillery support, the battalion met little opposition, and by 19.00 the line ran through Kortewilde to Zandvoorde. At a cost of no more than 16 casualties, the battalion had captured 63 prisoners, a battery of field guns, a howitzer, and a motor bus. The following morning 123rd Bde passed through and continued the advance towards the River Lys, while A and C Companies of 10th Queen's formed a flank guard for 123rd Bde along the Ypres–Comines Canal. 123rd Brigade failed to reach its objective because of a heavy counter-attack, so on 30 September 10th Queen's passed through, followed by 26th RF, and by 10.00 had reached the bank of the Lys between Comines and Wervicq, taking more prisoners and numerous machine guns. 10th Queen's consolidated along the riverbank. It was relieved next day and spent a week in brigade reserve in the Kruiseecke area, suffering from shelling and bad weather.

After a few days in camp at Steenacker, 10th Queen's went by train to 'Clapham Junction' on 13 October and marched off in the evening to act as brigade reserve for the attack next day (the Battle of Courtrai), with two companies attached to each of 26th RF and 20th DLI. Passing Au Rossignol Cabaret the tail of the column was shelled, causing some casualties and disorganisation before it reached the assembly position at 'Rifle Farm'. When the British barrage came down at Zero, the Germans put down a heavy retaliatory bombardment lasting two hours. The morning was misty and combined with the smoke from the barrage, the attacking battalions lost direction. When the fog lifted the three battalions were found to be considerably mixed up and came under close-range fire from an artillery battery and machine guns. Nevertheless, the battery was put out of action by two field guns in close support of 26th RF, and the three battalions reorganised, moved on, and captured and consolidated the objective by 16.00. Next morning 10th Queen's was relieved and went back for rest.

41st Division attacked again on 21 October to close up to the River Scheldt east of the Courtrai-Le Bossuyt Canal. 124th Brigade attacked at 07.30 with 10th Queen's leading on the left, reaching the Laatse Oortie–Hoogstraatje ridge about 11.00. At this point the Queen's were to turn half left and seize the canal crossing, then advance with the canal on their right while 26th RF moved up to take their place and continue the advance to the Scheldt. But a tunnel where the railway crossed the canal had been strongly wired and was held by a machine gun battalion. It could not be passed, while 26th RF were also caught by heavy artillery and machine guns. All further movement was impossible for the rest of the day. Another attempt was made next day (22 October) by 122nd Bde up the other side of the canal, helped by one company of 10th Queen's, which crossed the canal, but this again ran into machine gun fire. 10th Queen's sent an appreciation of the situation to Brigade HQ, and the battalions were ordered to stand fast. In the early afternoon divisional HQ ordered a renewal of the attack by 122nd Bde; these were later rescinded, but the cancellation arrived too late, some of 10th Queen's companies having already begun to advance. They succeeded in clearing the tunnel, capturing prisoners and machine guns. The battalion remained in action over the following days, though no further move was made until 25 October, when there was a general advance towards the Scheldt, covered by a barrage. 10th Queen's was in support of the other two battalions of 124th Bde. When they were held up, 10th Queen's was ordered to advance with two companies on either flank of the leading battalions, The attack on the left, with B and C Companies, was stopped after about 300 yards (270 m) by machine gun fire from the direction of Otteghem (6th Division's objective), while A and D Companies on the right were halted by close range artillery fire as they reached the crest line. However, at dusk patrols found that the enemy had withdrawn and 10th Queen's advanced to the line of the Driesch–Ooteghem road. Next day patrols pushed forwards unopposed as the enemy retired across the Scheldt. The battalion was then withdrawn to Courtrai for rest. In its final offensive operations in October, 10th Queen's had lost 2 officers and 26 ORs killed, 1 officer and 142 ORs wounded, and 1 missing. Although it took part in the final pursuit from 2 November, there was little action and few casualties. 10th Queen's was at Tenbosch, near Nederbrakel, when the Armistice with Germany came into force on 11 November.

During its war service 10th (Service) Battalion, Queen's Regiment (Battersea) had lost 44 officers and 640 ORs killed or missing, and 60 officers and 2200 ORs wounded, representing approximately three times its original strength.

=== Post-Armistice ===
On 18 November 41st Division learned that it had been selected as one of the British divisions to form part of the occupation forces in Germany and was ordered to continue its advance. 10th Queen's made a series of marches and by the end of the month it was at Viane. Here it carried out ceremonial parades and light training, and then resumed its march on 12 December, resting at Waterloo on the way. It spent Christmas and New Year at Wanze, near Liège. By now Maj Hayley Bell was again acting CO of 10th Queen's. On 6 January 1919 the battalion entrained for the last part of its journey, crossing into Germany to Hoffnungsthal Station and then marching into the Cologne bridgehead. Here it was billeted in Lindlar and given responsibility for an outpost line. Demobilisation got under way in January, when the first 55 men left for home. Others signed on for an additional year's service in the British Army of the Rhine.

On 15 March 41st Division was redesignated 'London Division', and 10th Queen's was moved to 123rd Bde, joining 11th Queen's and 2/4th Queen's. As men were progressively demobilised, 51st (Service) Bn, Queen's, previously a training unit, arrived from England and was absorbed into 11th Queen's on 1 April, maintaining the battalion at full strength. (The 51st Bn had originally been 8th (Reserve) Bn Northamptons, which had reinforced 11th Queen's in January 1916.) On 18 April, Lt-Col Robert Livesay, a Regular officer of the Queen's, arrived to take over command of the battalion. London Division was broken up in November 1919, when 10th and 11th Queen's joined 23rd Royal Fusiliers in forming 1st Rhine Brigade. On 31 December 1919, preparations began for the disbandment of 10th Queen's. 1st Rhine Brigade closed down in February 1920, and at the end of the month 10th Queen's moved to Muhlheim Barracks in Cologne, to help with salvage work. On 6 March the remaining men of the battalion moved out to No 1 Concentration Camp at Cologne for dispersal to other units, and the battalion was disbanded.

== Insignia ==
The battalion wore the Queen's Regiment badge (the Paschal Lamb) on cloth service caps. During initial training the ORs wore an embroidered cloth shoulder title with 'BATTERSEA' in dark blue or white on a khaki arc. This was discarded on leaving for active service and the standard 'QUEEN'S' brass shoulder title was used. Between late July and mid-September 1917 the battalion adopted a circle of yellow (the brigade colour) worn on the back directly beneath the collar. Battalion signallers wore a blue stripe under the shoulder title and a blue band on the left cuff, while the runners wore these in red.

41st Division's sign was a white diagonal stripe across a coloured square, which was yellow in the case of 124th Brigade. This was not worn on the uniform but only on vehicles and signboards. Battalion transport vehicles carried a numeral on a background of brigade colour; as the senior battalion in the brigade, 10th Queen's numeral would have been '1'.

== Memorials ==
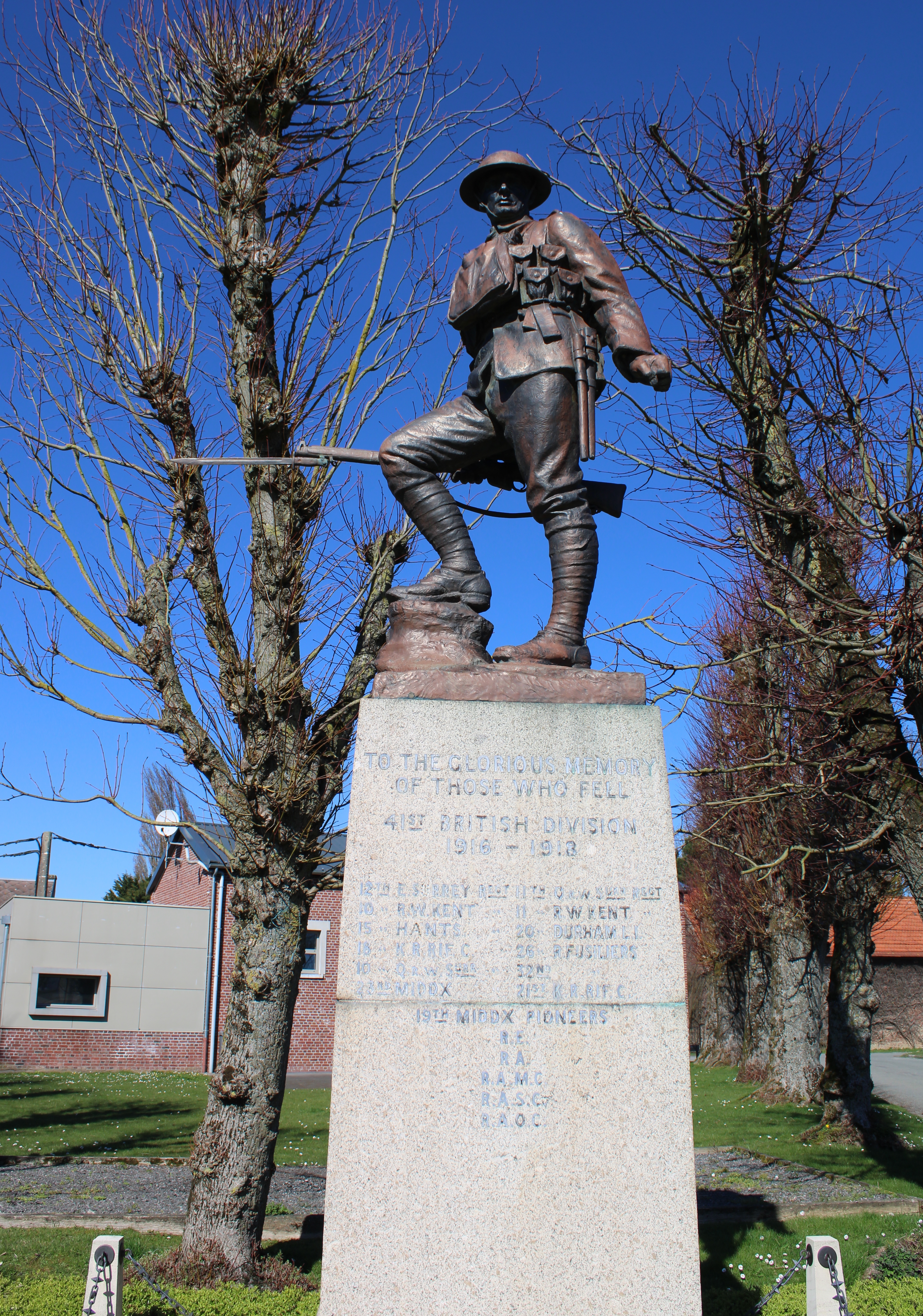
41st Division's memorial at Flers.

The Queen's Regiment's memorials are in Holy Trinity Church, Guildford (the regimental depot town). The monument to the 11,000 men of the regiment who died in World War I and World War II is a large wooden panel with a central niche surmounted by the badge of the Paschal Lamb, designed by Capt Edwin Stanley Hall of 10th Queen's, later president of the Royal Institute of British Architects. Above the panel there is a stained glass window depicting St Catherine of Siena kneeling before Christ, with an inscription reading 'To the Glory of God and in memory of all ranks of the 10th Service Battalion The Queen's who gave their lives 1914–1919'.

War-raised battalions that served overseas were granted a King's Colour at the end of the war, and 10th Queen's received its at a ceremony at Ehreshoven, Germany, in February 1919. In January 1920, shortly before it was disbanded, 10th Queen's escorted its colour to Holy Trinity Church, Guildford, to be laid up. However, there was strong feeling that it should be in Battersea, so on 25 June 1933 it was returned for laying up in St Mary's Church, Battersea. Lieutenant-Cols Oakley and Jarvis led the ceremonies. At a later date the remnants of the colour were taken to the regimental museum.

Lieutenant-Col Jarvis of 10th Queen's was also the chief organiser in raising money for the 41st Division memorial at Flers, which was unveiled in 1932. The bronze figure by Albert Toft is a copy of his Royal Fusiliers War Memorial in London. The pedestal lists all of the division's units, including 10th Queen's.

The battalion is listed on a memorial plaque outside the present Wandsworth Town Hall to the 'Wandsworth Army Units 1914–1945', including those of the former Borough of Battersea.

The 38 men of 10th Queen's (together with 4 from other units) who were killed outright by the bombing raid on the night of 18 August 1917 were buried next day in a single mass grave in a corner of the field where they were camped. It was named 'Royal West Surrey Cemetery' and only one further burial (of a Canadian soldier in 1918) took place there. After the war the bodies were exhumed by the Commonwealth War Graves Commission and re-buried at Bertenacre Military Cemetery at Flêtre, about 460 m to the northwest.
