= Sars-et-Rosières =

- Commune
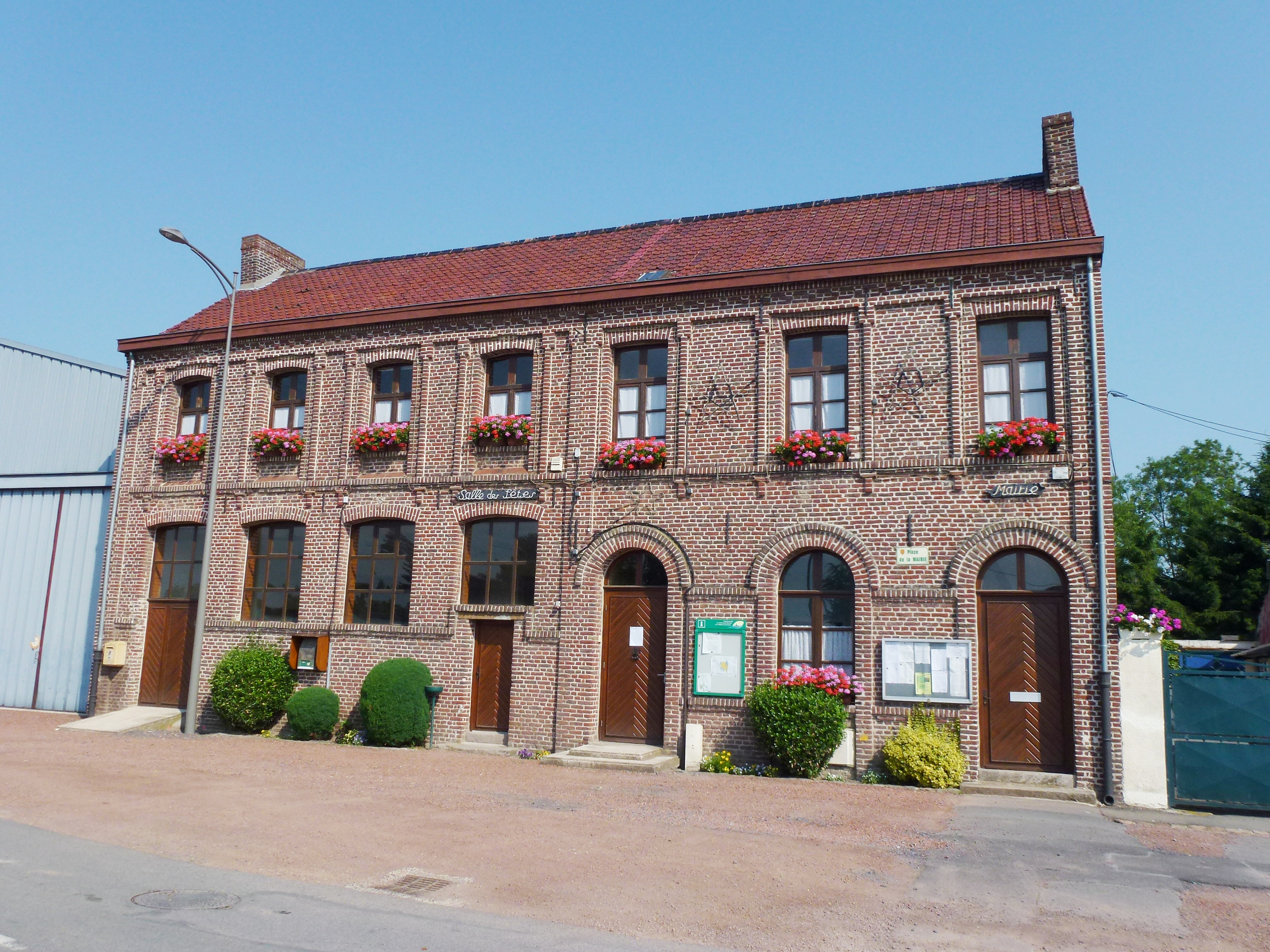
- The town hall in Sars-et-Rosières

- Coat of arms
- Location of Sars-et-Rosières
- Location within France Location within Hauts-de-France
- Coordinates: 50°26′44″N 3°19′57″E
- Country: France
- Region: Hauts-de-France
- Department: Nord
- Arrondissement: Valenciennes
- Canton: Saint-Amand-les-Eaux
- Intercommunality: CA Porte du Hainaut

Government
  - Mayor (2020–2026): Jean-Michel Michalak
- Area^{1}: 2.6 km^{2} (1.0 sq mi)
- Elevation: 19 m (62 ft)
- Highest elevation: 21 m (69 ft)
- Lowest elevation: 16 m (52 ft)
- Population (2023): 620
  - Density: 240/km^{2} (620/sq mi)
- Time zone: UTC+01:00 (CET)
  - Summer (DST): UTC+02:00 (CEST)
- INSEE/Postal code: 59554 /59230
- ^{1} French Land Register data, which excludes lakes, ponds, glaciers > 1 km^{2} (0.386 sq mi or 247 acres) and river estuaries.

Sars-et-Rosières (French pronunciation: [saʁ e ʁozjɛʁ]) is a commune in the Nord department in northern France. It is noted as a castle. The Château du Loir, was constructed in the 15th century. Its ruins are a protected monument.

== Sport ==
The 2025 Paris–Roubaix Femmes passed through Sars et Rosieres on 12 April.

== Heraldry ==
Arms of Sars-et-Rosières	The arms of Sars-et-Rosières are blazoned : Chequy Or and gules. (Oxelaëre, Quesnoy-sur-Deûle and Sars-et-Rosières use the same arms.)

== See also ==
- Communes of the Nord department
