= Quesnoy-sur-Deûle =

Quesnoy-sur-Deûle Kiezenet
- Commune
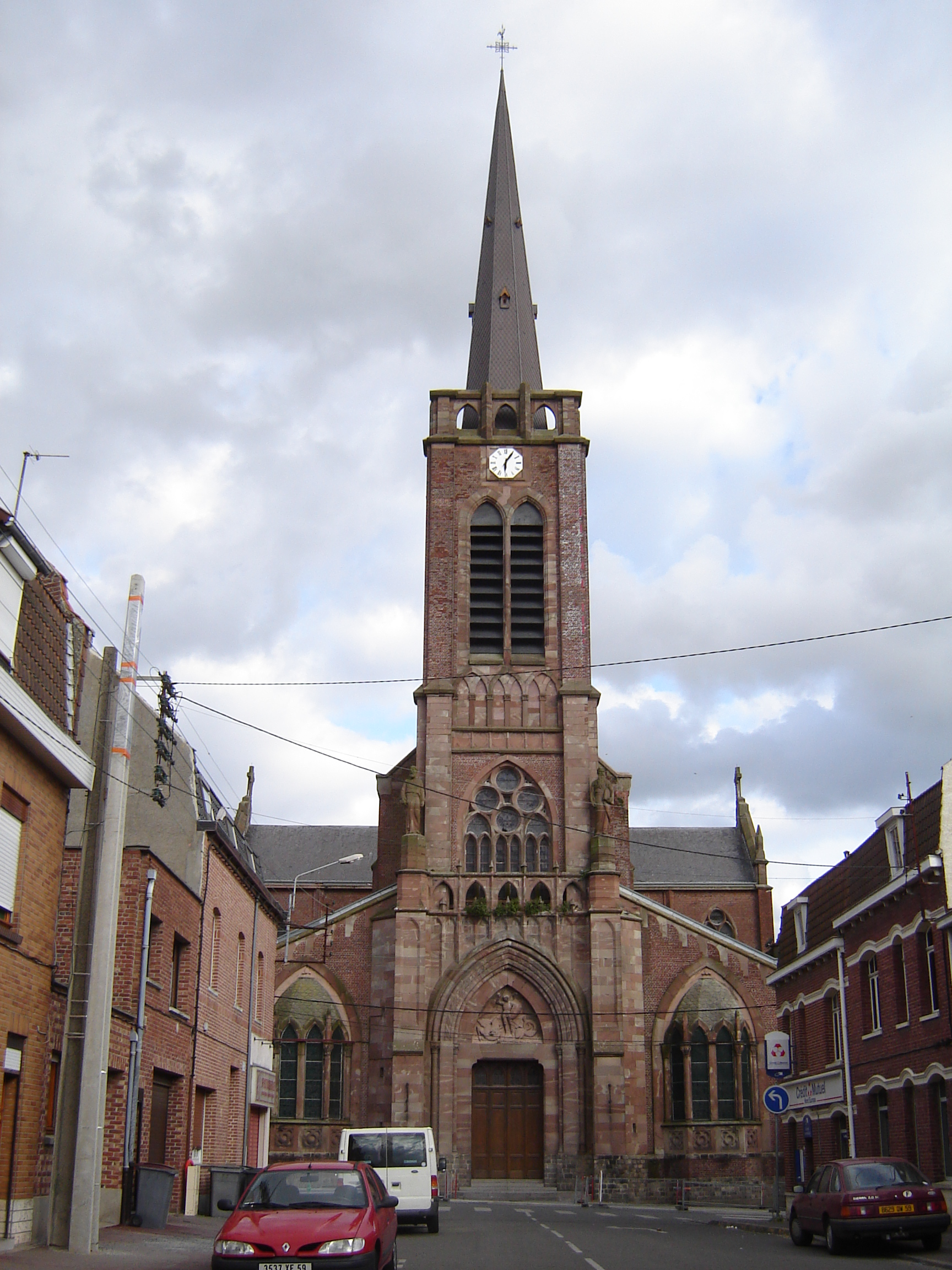
- Church of Saint Michel, Quesnoy-sur-Deûle

- Coat of arms
- Location of Quesnoy-sur-Deûle
- Location within France Location within Hauts-de-France
- Coordinates: 50°42′47″N 3°00′01″E
- Country: France
- Region: Hauts-de-France
- Department: Nord
- Arrondissement: Lille
- Canton: Lambersart
- Intercommunality: Métropole Européenne de Lille

Government
  - Mayor (2020–2026): Rose-Marie Hallynck
- Area^{1}: 14.36 km^{2} (5.54 sq mi)
- Elevation: 23 m (75 ft)
- Highest elevation: 21 m (69 ft)
- Lowest elevation: 12 m (39 ft)
- Population (2023): 6,805
  - Density: 473.9/km^{2} (1,227/sq mi)
- Time zone: UTC+01:00 (CET)
  - Summer (DST): UTC+02:00 (CEST)
- INSEE/Postal code: 59482 /59890
- ^{1} French Land Register data, which excludes lakes, ponds, glaciers > 1 km^{2} (0.386 sq mi or 247 acres) and river estuaries.

Quesnoy-sur-Deûle (French pronunciation: [kenwa syʁ døl], literally Quesnoy on Deûle; West Flemish: Kiezenet) is a commune in the Nord department in northern France. It is part of the Métropole Européenne de Lille.

== Population ==
Historical population
Year	Pop.	±% p.a.
1968	4,588	—
1975	4,810	+0.68%
1982	5,427	+1.74%
1990	5,775	+0.78%
1999	6,380	+1.11%
2007	6,967	+1.11%
2012	6,969	+0.01%
2017	6,758	−0.61%
2023	6,805	+0.12%
Source: INSEE

== Heraldry ==
Arms of Quesnoy-sur-Deûle	The arms of Quesnoy-sur-Deûle are blazoned : Chequy Or and gules. (Oxelaëre, Quesnoy-sur-Deûle and Sars-et-Rosières use the same arms.)

== See also ==
- Communes of the Nord department
