= Le Doulieu =

- Commune
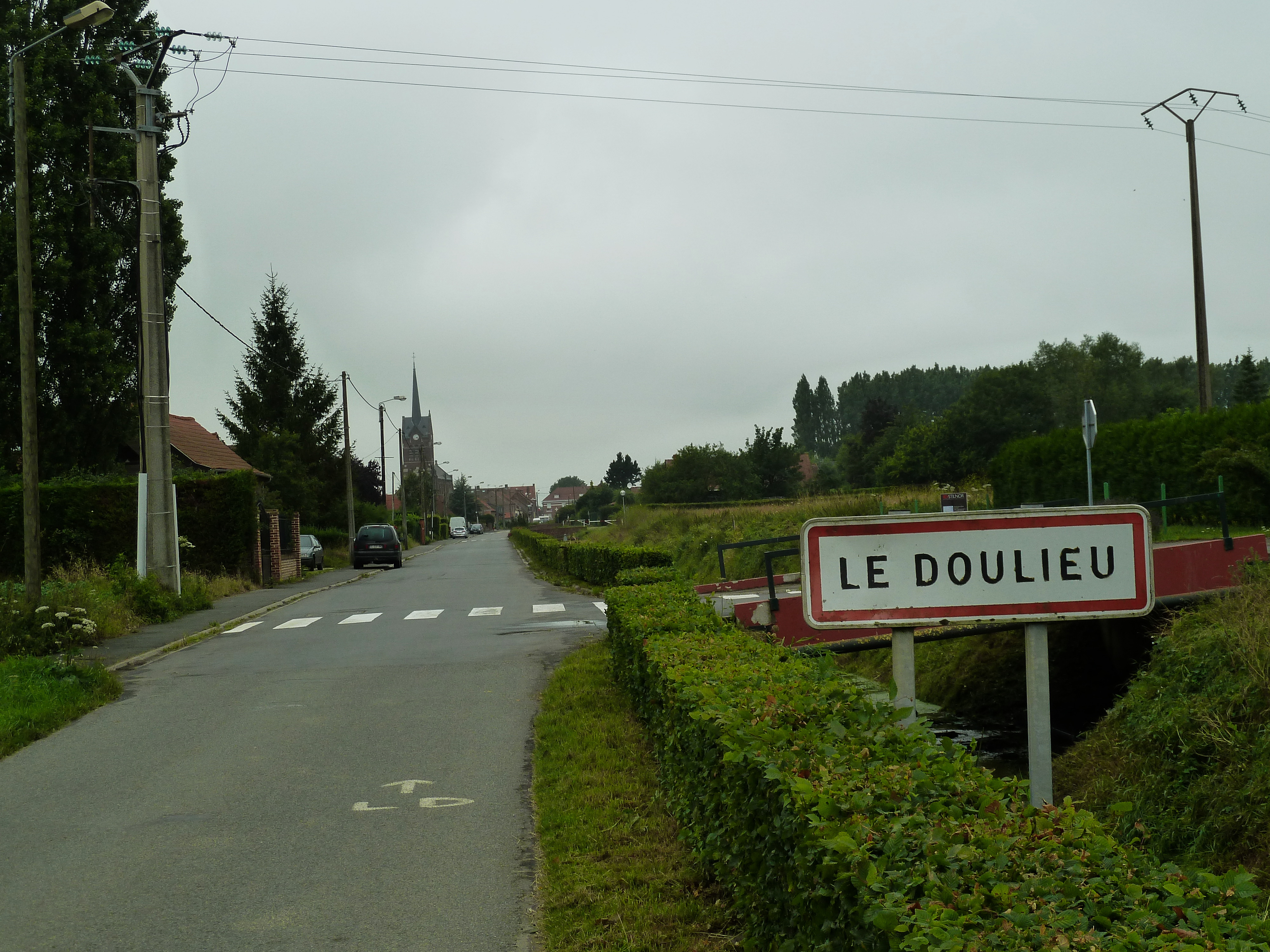
- The road into Le Doulieu

- Coat of arms
- Location of Le Doulieu
- Location within France Location within Hauts-de-France
- Coordinates: 50°40′57″N 2°43′07″E
- Country: France
- Region: Hauts-de-France
- Department: Nord
- Arrondissement: Dunkerque
- Canton: Bailleul
- Intercommunality: CA Cœur de Flandre

Government
  - Mayor (2020–2026): Dominique Walbrou
- Area^{1}: 11.74 km^{2} (4.53 sq mi)
- Elevation: 16 m (52 ft)
- Highest elevation: 19 m (62 ft)
- Lowest elevation: 15 m (49 ft)
- Population (2023): 1,436
  - Density: 122.3/km^{2} (316.8/sq mi)
- Demonym(s): Doulieusiens, Doulieusiennes
- Time zone: UTC+01:00 (CET)
  - Summer (DST): UTC+02:00 (CEST)
- INSEE/Postal code: 59180 /59940
- ^{1} French Land Register data, which excludes lakes, ponds, glaciers > 1 km^{2} (0.386 sq mi or 247 acres) and river estuaries.

Le Doulieu (French pronunciation: [lə duljø]; Dutch: Zoeterstee) is a commune in the Nord department in northern France.

== Heraldry ==
Arms of Le Doulieu	The arms of Le Doulieu are blazoned : Gules, a saltire vair. (Le Doulieu and Eecke use the same arms.)

== See also ==
- Communes of the Nord department
