= Oxelaëre =

Oxelaëre Okselare
- Commune
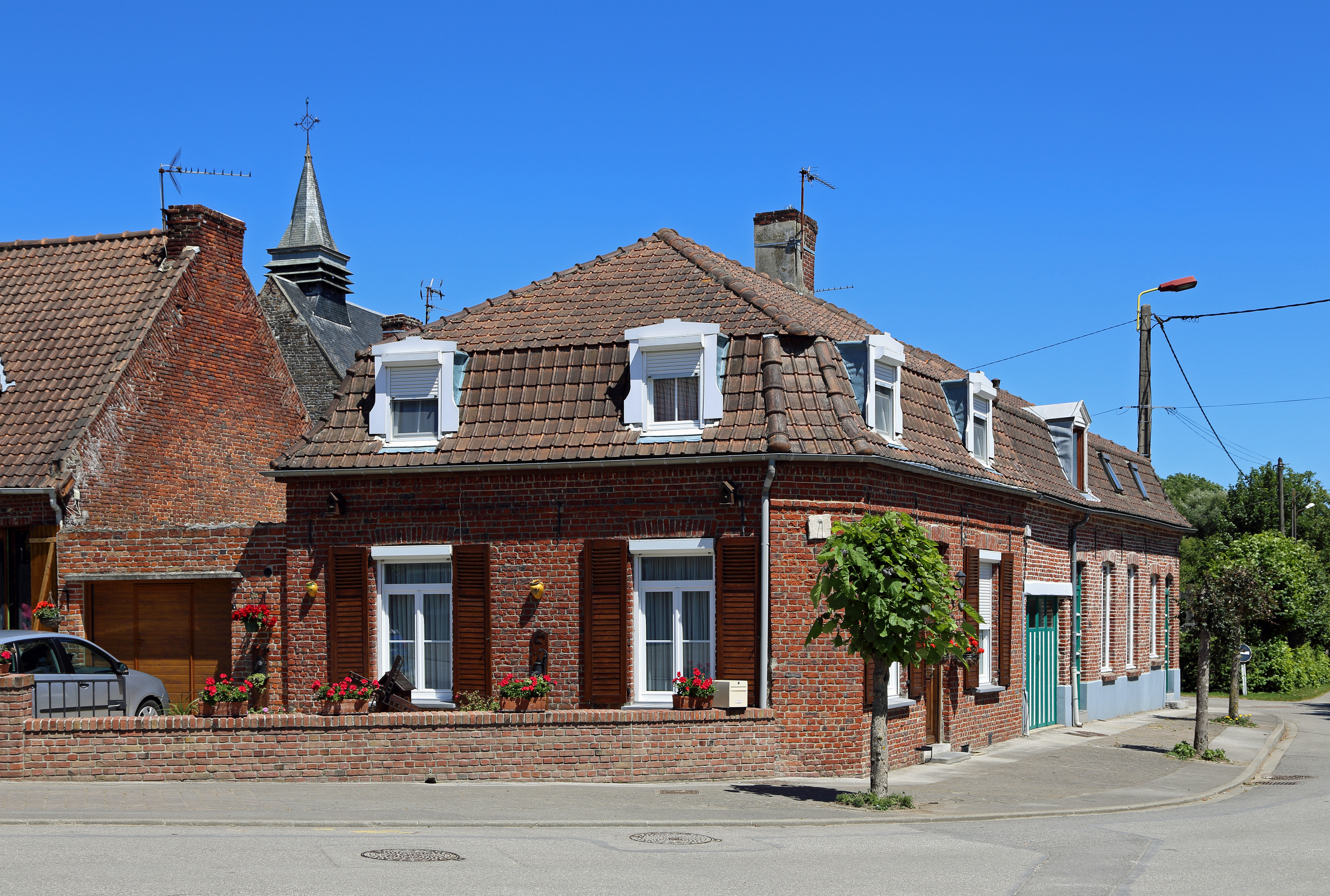
- Houses in the centre of the village

- Coat of arms
- Location of Oxelaëre
- Location within France Location within Hauts-de-France
- Coordinates: 50°47′22″N 2°28′24″E
- Country: France
- Region: Hauts-de-France
- Department: Nord
- Arrondissement: Dunkerque
- Canton: Bailleul
- Intercommunality: CA Cœur de Flandre

Government
  - Mayor (2020–2026): Stéphane Dieusaert
- Area^{1}: 4.72 km^{2} (1.82 sq mi)
- Elevation: 36 m (118 ft)
- Highest elevation: 103 m (338 ft)
- Lowest elevation: 29 m (95 ft)
- Population (2023): 540
  - Density: 110/km^{2} (300/sq mi)
- Demonym: Oxelaërois (es)
- Time zone: UTC+01:00 (CET)
  - Summer (DST): UTC+02:00 (CEST)
- INSEE/Postal code: 59454 /59670
- ^{1} French Land Register data, which excludes lakes, ponds, glaciers > 1 km^{2} (0.386 sq mi or 247 acres) and river estuaries.

Oxelaëre (French pronunciation: [ɔksəlaʁ]; from Flemish; Okselare in modern Dutch spelling) is a commune in the Nord department in northern France.

== Heraldry ==
Arms of Oxelaëre	The arms of Oxelaëre are blazoned : Chequy Or and gules. (Oxelaëre, Quesnoy-sur-Deûle and Sars-et-Rosières use the same arms.)

== See also ==
- Communes of the Nord department
