= Pradelles, Nord =

Pradelles Pradeels
- Commune
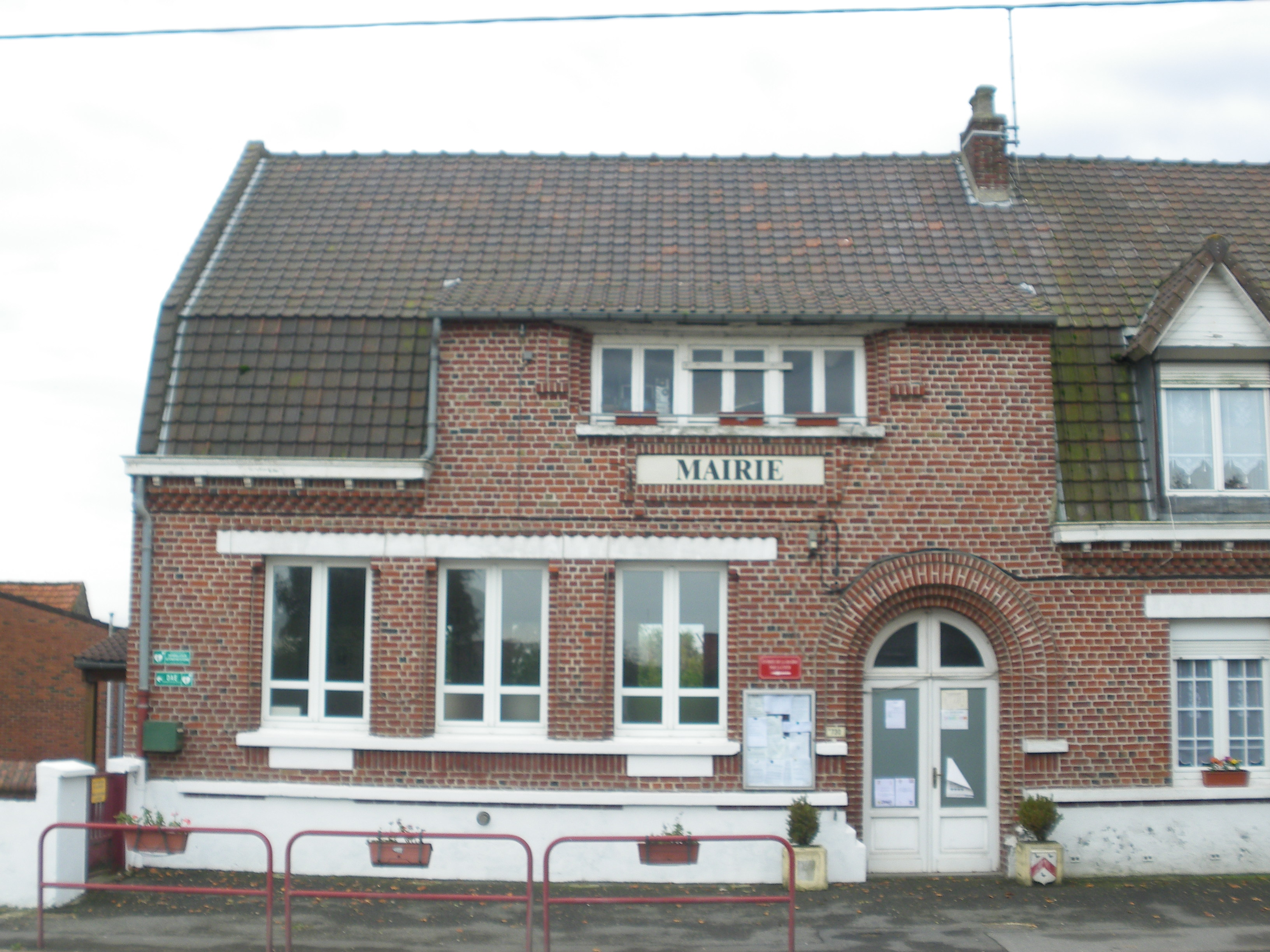
- The town hall in Pradelles

- Coat of arms
- Location of Pradelles
- Location within France Location within Hauts-de-France
- Coordinates: 50°43′58″N 2°36′19″E
- Country: France
- Region: Hauts-de-France
- Department: Nord
- Arrondissement: Dunkerque
- Canton: Bailleul
- Intercommunality: CA Cœur de Flandre

Government
  - Mayor (2020–2026): Christophe Debreu
- Area^{1}: 3.27 km^{2} (1.26 sq mi)
- Elevation: 25 m (82 ft)
- Highest elevation: 62 m (203 ft)
- Lowest elevation: 17 m (56 ft)
- Population (2023): 399
  - Density: 122/km^{2} (316/sq mi)
- Demonym: Pradellois (es)
- Time zone: UTC+01:00 (CET)
  - Summer (DST): UTC+02:00 (CEST)
- INSEE/Postal code: 59469 /59190
- ^{1} French Land Register data, which excludes lakes, ponds, glaciers > 1 km^{2} (0.386 sq mi or 247 acres) and river estuaries.

Pradelles (French pronunciation: [pʁadɛl]; from Flemish; Pradeels in modern Dutch spelling) is a commune in the Nord department in northern France.

== Heraldry ==
Arms of Pradelles	The arms of Pradelles are blazoned : Argent, a chevron gules between 3 martlets sable.

== See also ==
- Communes of the Nord department
