= Canton of Bailleul =

Coordinates: 50.74°N 2.73°E

The canton of Bailleul is an administrative division of the Nord department, northern France. It was created at the French canton reorganisation which came into effect in March 2015. Its seat is in Bailleul.

It consists of the following communes:

1. Bailleul
2. Berthen
3. Boeschepe
4. Borre
5. Caëstre
6. Cassel
7. Le Doulieu
8. Eecke
9. Flêtre
10. Godewaersvelde
11. Hondeghem
12. Merris
13. Méteren
14. Nieppe
15. Oxelaëre
16. Pradelles
17. Sainte-Marie-Cappel
18. Saint-Jans-Cappel
19. Saint-Sylvestre-Cappel
20. Staple
21. Steenwerck
22. Strazeele
23. Vieux-Berquin
