= Strazeele =

Strazeele Strazele
- Commune
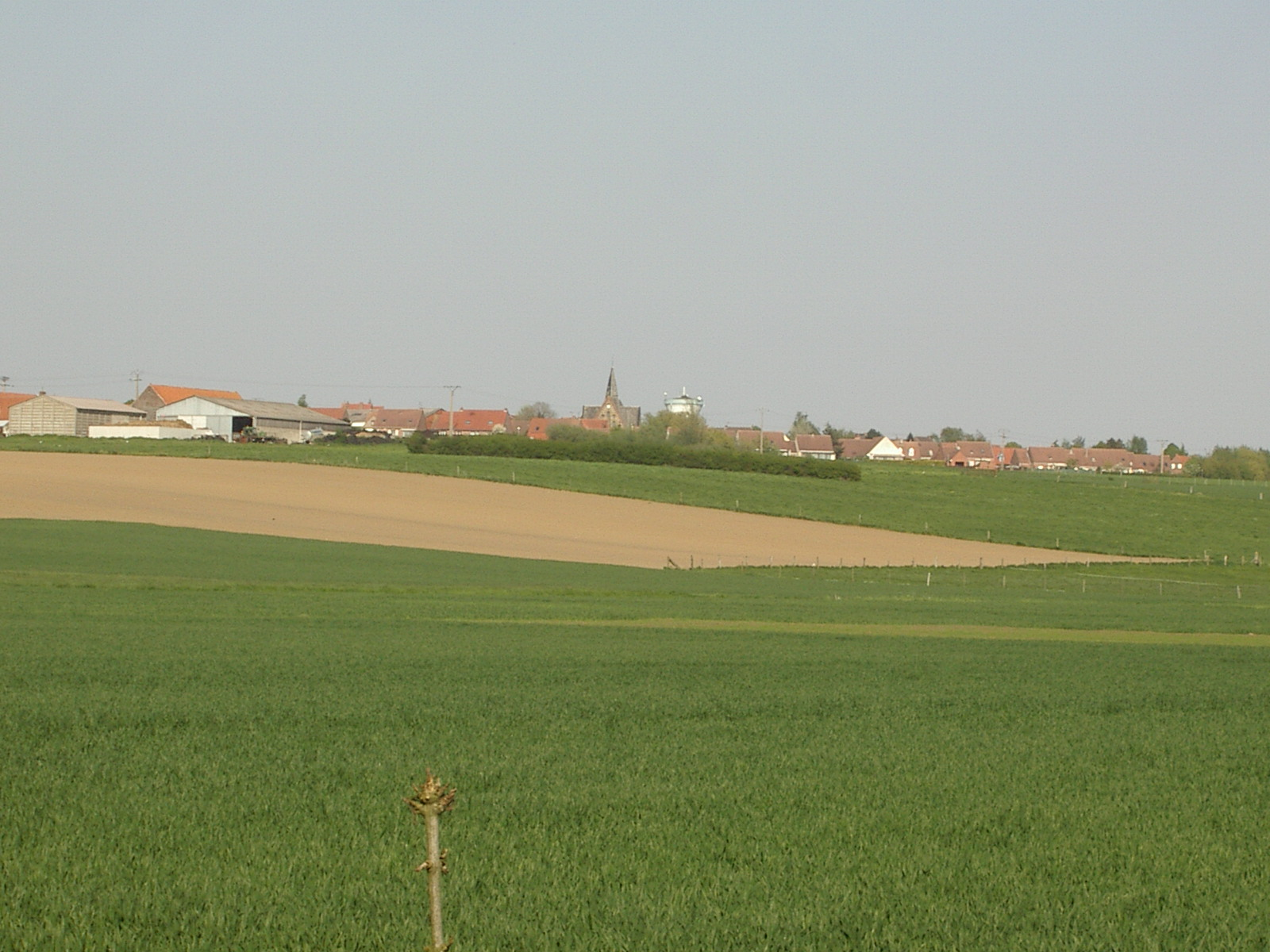
- A general view of Strazeele

- Coat of arms
- Location of Strazeele
- Location within France Location within Hauts-de-France
- Coordinates: 50°43′39″N 2°37′55″E
- Country: France
- Region: Hauts-de-France
- Department: Nord
- Arrondissement: Dunkerque
- Canton: Bailleul
- Intercommunality: CA Cœur de Flandre

Government
  - Mayor (2020–2026): Élisabeth Gressier
- Area^{1}: 4.69 km^{2} (1.81 sq mi)
- Elevation: 51 m (167 ft)
- Highest elevation: 61 m (200 ft)
- Lowest elevation: 17 m (56 ft)
- Population (2023): 942
  - Density: 201/km^{2} (520/sq mi)
- Demonym: Strazeelois(es)
- Time zone: UTC+01:00 (CET)
  - Summer (DST): UTC+02:00 (CEST)
- INSEE/Postal code: 59582 /59270
- ^{1} French Land Register data, which excludes lakes, ponds, glaciers > 1 km^{2} (0.386 sq mi or 247 acres) and river estuaries.

Strazeele (French pronunciation: [stʁazɛl]; from Flemish; Strazele in modern Dutch spelling) is a commune in the Nord department in northern France.

== Heraldry ==
Arms of Strazeele	The arms of Strazeele are blazoned : Gules, a bend, between in orle 6 mullets of six points Or.

== See also ==
- Communes of the Nord department
