= Bertenacre Military Cemetery =

CWGC cemetery in northern France

Coordinates: 50°46′40″N 2°37′50″E

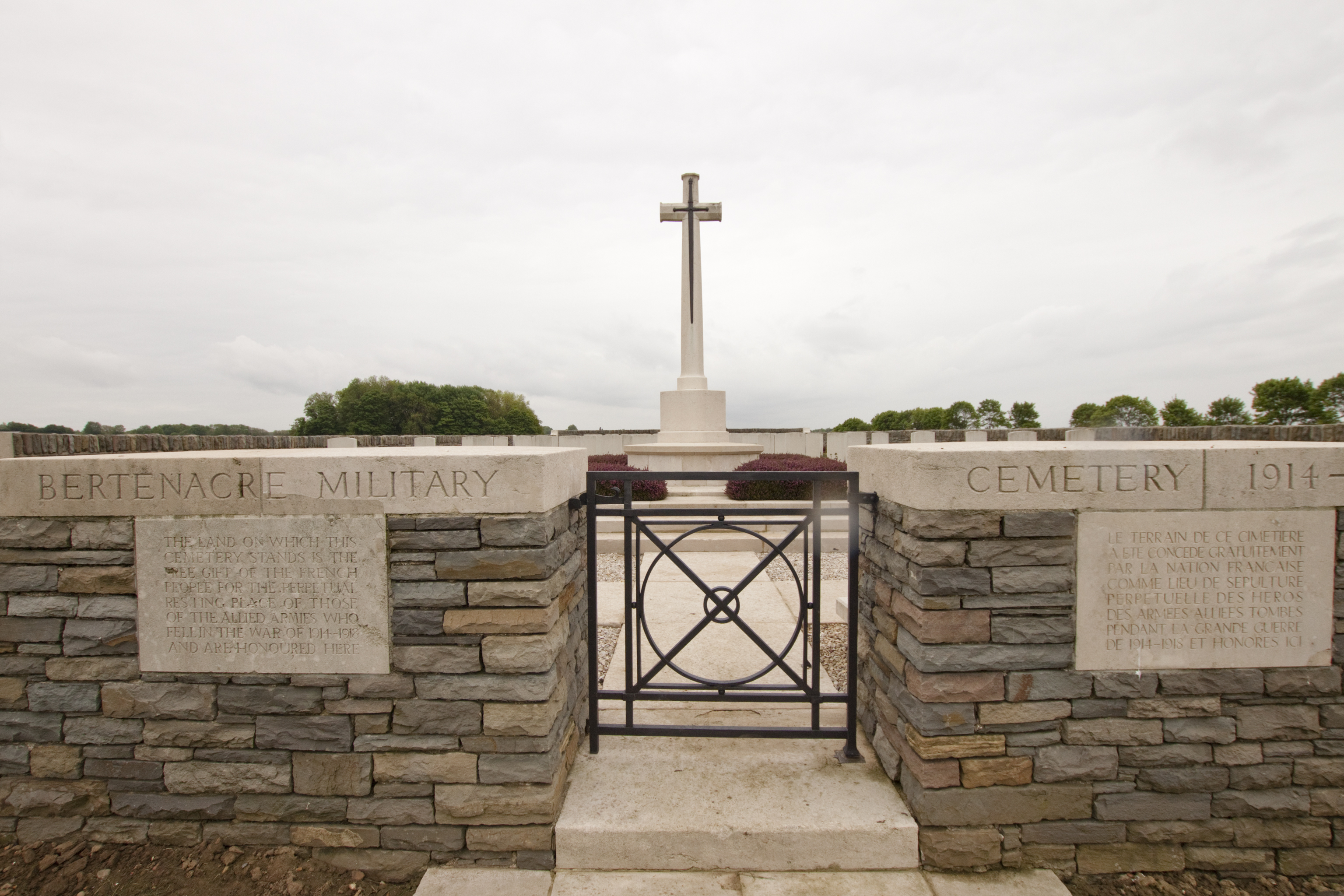
Bertenacre Military Cemetery

Bertenacre Military Cemetery is a British military cemetery with casualties from both world wars, located in the French town of Flêtre in the Nord department in northern France. The cemetery is located about three kilometers north of Flêtre, a few hundred meters south of the road from Eecke to Godewaersvelde, near the hamlet Berthenaere. There are 147 casualties commemorated: 112 from the First World War and 35 from the Second World War. The cemetery is maintained by the Commonwealth War Graves Commission. The site has an area of 716 sqm. A Cross of Sacrifice stands in front.

The cemetery was begun by French units and named "Cimetière du Calvaire de Bertenaere" after a nearby calvary cross. In the summer of 1918 a British division also buried its dead here. After the war, 115 French and two German graves were evacuated and transferred elsewhere. The cemetery was also extended with British graves that were transferred from Royal West Surrey Cemetery in Flêtre.

In the Second World War there were another 35 British burials here.
