= Robert Livesay =

English cricketer and British Army officer

Brigadier-General Robert Livesay CMG DSO
- Born: Robert O'Hara Livesay; 27 June 1876; Gillingham, Kent
- Died: 23 March 1946 (aged 69); Magham Down, Sussex
- Alma mater: Wellington College; Royal Military Academy, Sandhurst
- Military career
- Allegiance: United Kingdom
- Branch: British Army
- Service years: 1896–1921
- Rank: Brigadier-General
- Commands: 24 Infantry Brigade (1918); 10 btn. Royal West Surreys (1919); 1 Infantry Brigade (1919–1921)
- Conflicts: Second Boer War; Relief of Ladysmith; Battle of Colenso; Battle of Spion Kop; Battle of Vaal Krantz; Battle of the Tugela Heights; World War I
- Awards: Distinguished Service Order; Legion of Honour; Distinguished Service Medal; Order of St Michael and St George
- Cricket career

Cricket information
- Batting: Right-handed
- Bowling: Right-arm medium

Domestic team information
- Years: Team
- 1895–1904: Kent

Career statistics
Competition	First-class
Matches	26
Runs scored	986
Batting average	22.93
100s/50s	0/6
Top score	78
Balls bowled	5
Wickets	0
Bowling average	–
5 wickets in innings	–
10 wickets in match	–
Best bowling	–
Catches/stumpings	8/–
- Source: CricketArchive, 17 April 2019

Brigadier-General Robert O'Hara Livesay CMG DSO (27 June 1876 – 23 March 1946) was a British Army officer and English sportsman who played international rugby union for England and first-class cricket. He was awarded the Distinguished Service Order and later appointed a Companion of the Order of St Michael and St George. Attached to the New Zealand Division during many of the major battles of World War I, he was mentioned in despatches three times and received the French Legion of Honour in recognition of that unit's successes.

== Early life ==
Livesay was born at Old Brompton, then part of Gillingham in Kent. His father Robert Livesay was a Colonel in the Royal Engineers based in the town. Livesay was educated at Wellington College, where he played in the rugby XV and the cricket XI, leaving school in 1894 before attending the Royal Military Academy, Sandhurst. He continued to play both sports at Sandhurst.

== Military career ==
After graduating from Sandhurst, Livesay was commissioned as a second-lieutenant in the Queen's (Royal West Surrey) Regiment on 5 September 1896, and promoted to lieutenant on 18 May 1898. He fought in the Second Boer War in South Africa between 1900 and 1902, where he took part in the Relief of Ladysmith, the battles of Colenso, Spion Kop, Vaal Krantz, and the Tugela Heights and Pieter's Hill. In the following months he took part in operations in Natal, including the action at Laing's Nek. He was mentioned in despatches in 1902 and appointed a Companion of the Distinguished Service Order (DSO) in the South Africa Honours list published on 26 June 1902. He was awarded the Queen's South Africa Medal with five clasps and the King's South Africa Medal as a result of his service during the war.

After returning from South Africa, Livesay was promoted to captain in January 1903 and appointed as an instructor at Sandhurst, serving at the academy between 1904 and 1908. He retired from active service in January 1914 and joined the Reserve of Officers.

At the start of the First World War, Livesay was activated from the Reserve, initially serving as a staff officer with the 48th Infantry Division as part of "Central Force", charged with the defence of the United Kingdom. The division was posted to France in 1915 and Livesay was serving near Cassel when he was attached to the New Zealand Division after their service at Armentières. He served with the New Zealanders for 16 months as General Staff Officer 1 (GSO1), the officer responsible to the Divisional Commander Major General Sir Andrew Hamilton Russell for planning and directing training and the conduct of operations. The New Zealand Division's success during the Battle of the Somme was due in part to the outstanding work of Livesay and was recognised by the French with the award of the Chevalier of the Legion of Honour by the French Republic in May 1917.

He was again conspicuous in his service at Messines and Passchendaele, before leaving the New Zealand Division to serve as GSO 1 at the American Staff School until March 1918 when he was appointed as Brevet colonel with the 61st Infantry Division, serving with the division during the German Kaiserschlacht offensive. He was appointed to command 24th Infantry Brigade with the rank of Temporary brigadier general during the last few months of the war.

Livesay served in Germany with the Army of Occupation during 1919, commanding 10th (Service) Battalion, Queen's (Royal West Surrey Regiment) (Battersea) at Lindlar. He was made a Companion of the Order of St Michael and St George (CMG) in the 1919 Birthday Honours, before returning to the UK in July and taking command of 1 Infantry Brigade at Aldershot. He was awarded the American Distinguished Service Medal in recognition of his role training American officers. He retired from the army in September 1921 with the honorary rank of brigadier general.

== Sporting life ==
Livesay played both rugby union and cricket at school. He was a fly-half who played club rugby for Blackheath F.C. He played in two Test matches for the England team, both against Wales. They came in the 1898 Home Nations Championship and 1899 Home Nations Championship. As well as playing regularly for his club, Livesay played for Barbarian F.C. on a number of occasions and for Kent in the Rugby County Championship.

A right handed batsman, Livesay played 26 first-class cricket matches for Kent County Cricket Club, all but one of which came in the County Championship between 1895 and 1904. The other was a fixture against the touring South Africans, at Canterbury in 1904, when he made a career best 78 in the first innings, before being run out.

Livesay, who had been considered a fine batsman at school and scored centuries both for his school and whilst at Sandhurst, made five Championship half-centuries for Kent and was awarded his county cap in 1896. He also scored 69 runs in a match against Yorkshire at Harrogate which was declared void after the umpires ruled that the pitch had been tampered with after the first days play. His Wisden obituary described him as an "attractive bat" and that he "fielded admirably".

He played club cricket occasionally into the 20th century, including for St Lawrence, Blackheath and Hythe. He also played occasionally for Marylebone Cricket Club (MCC), including against Dorset in 1908.

== Family and later life ==
Livesay married Margaret Pretyman at Torquay in 1917, taking leave from the army to get married. He died at Magham Down in Sussex in 1946 aged 69.

== Bibliography ==
- Carlaw, Derek (2020). Kent County Cricketers, A to Z: Part One (1806–1914) (PDF). Cardiff: ACS.
