= Saint-Jans-Cappel =

- Commune
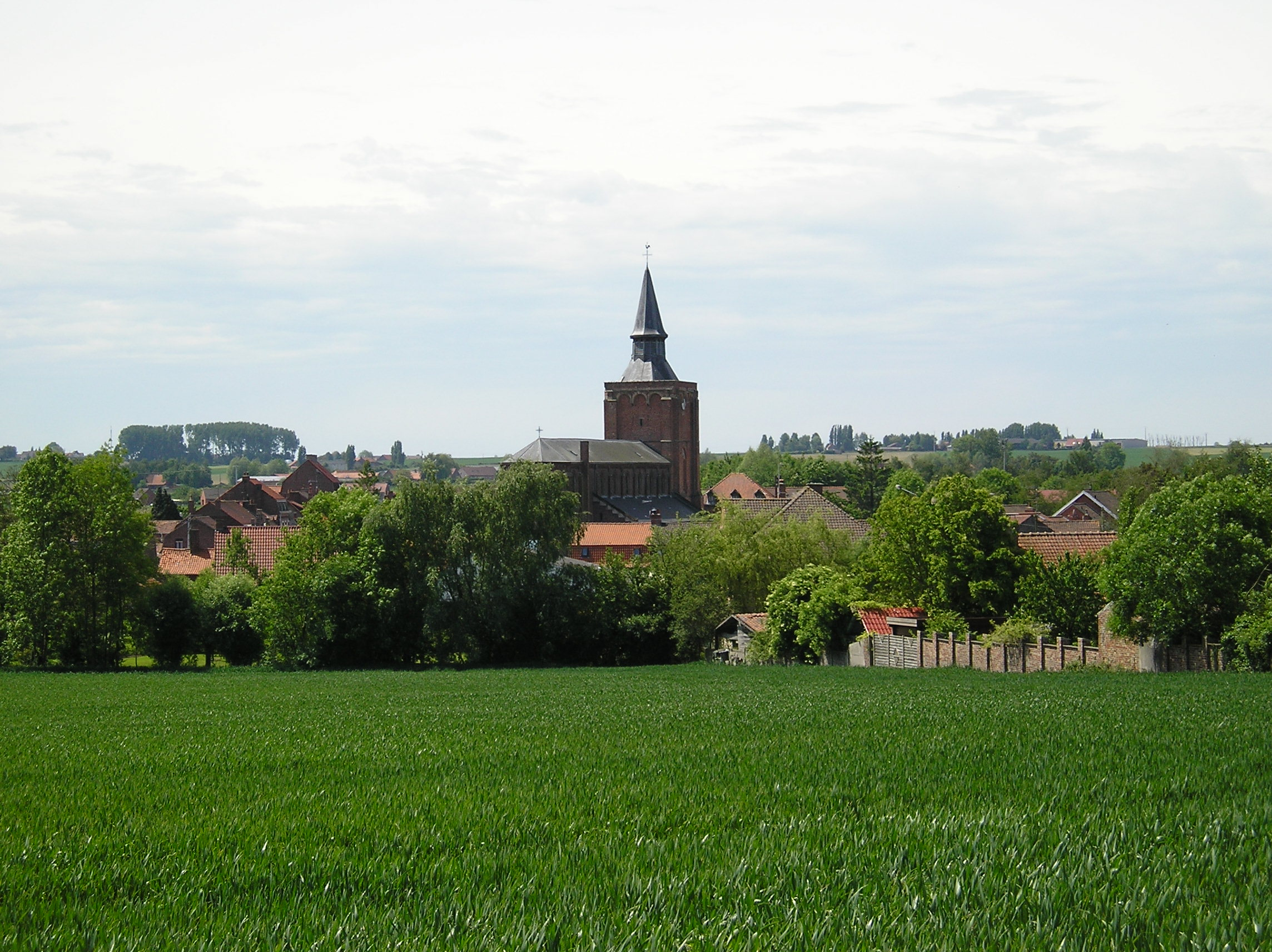
- A general view of Saint-Jans-Cappel

- Coat of arms
- Location of Saint-Jans-Cappel
- Location within France Location within Hauts-de-France
- Coordinates: 50°45′50″N 2°43′21″E
- Country: France
- Region: Hauts-de-France
- Department: Nord
- Arrondissement: Dunkerque
- Canton: Bailleul
- Intercommunality: CA Cœur de Flandre

Government
  - Mayor (2020–2026): César Storet
- Area^{1}: 7.96 km^{2} (3.07 sq mi)
- Elevation: 30 m (98 ft)
- Highest elevation: 152 m (499 ft)
- Lowest elevation: 26 m (85 ft)
- Population (2023): 1,598
  - Density: 201/km^{2} (520/sq mi)
- Time zone: UTC+01:00 (CET)
  - Summer (DST): UTC+02:00 (CEST)
- INSEE/Postal code: 59535 /59270
- ^{1} French Land Register data, which excludes lakes, ponds, glaciers > 1 km^{2} (0.386 sq mi or 247 acres) and river estuaries.

Saint-Jans-Cappel (French pronunciation: [sɛ̃ ʒɑ̃s kapɛl]; Dutch: Sint-Jans Kapel) is a commune in the Nord department in northern France.

== Heraldry ==
| Arms of Saint-Jans-Cappel | The arms of Saint-Jans-Cappel are blazoned : Or a cross vair, the points abutting in the center of the cross, a canton in chief dexter with an Agnus Dei regardant with a flag adorned with a black cross |

== See also ==
- Communes of the Nord department
- French Flanders
