= Méteren =

Méteren Meteren
- Commune
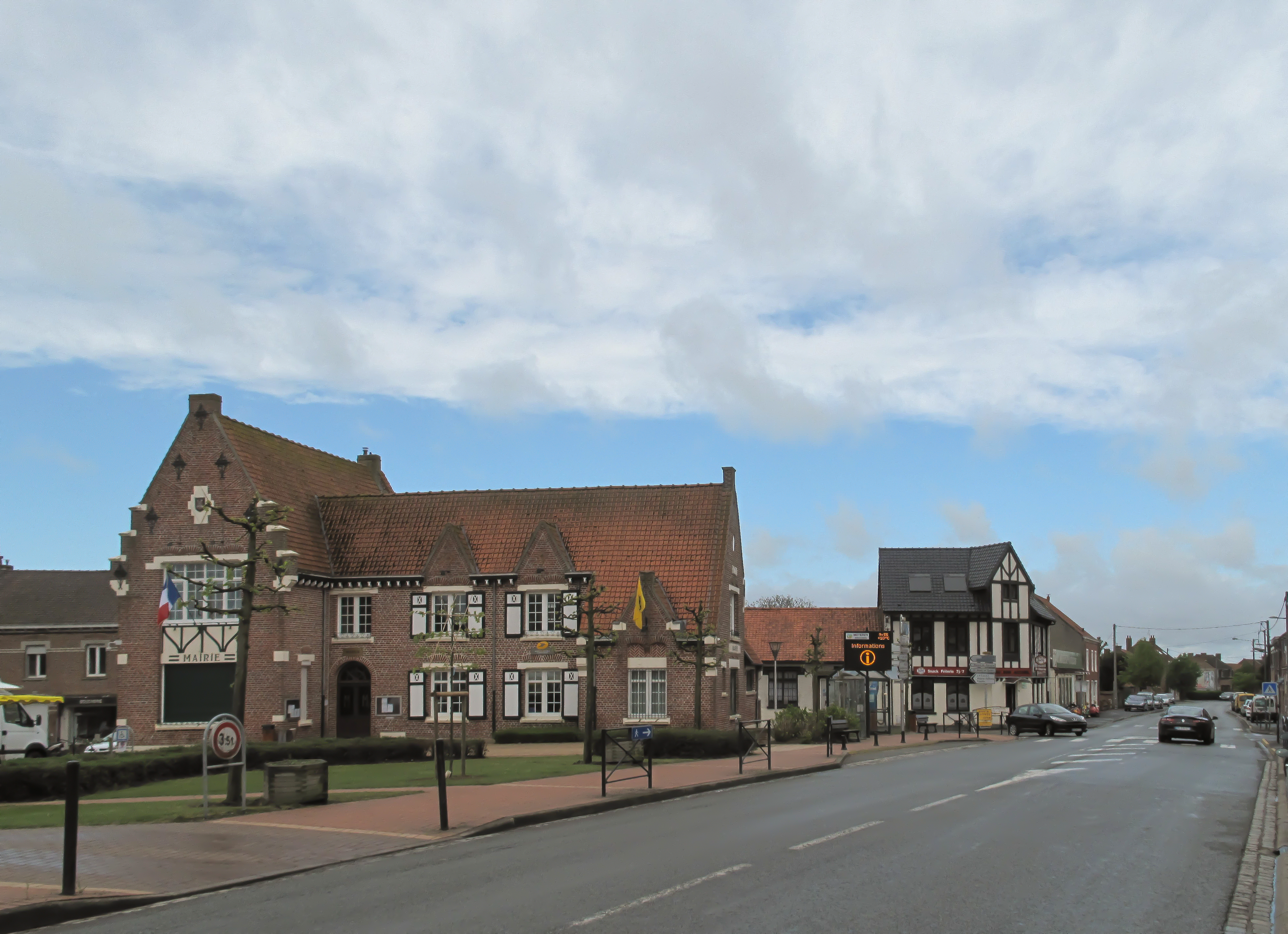
- Méteren, view to a street
- Location of Méteren
- Location within France Location within Hauts-de-France
- Coordinates: 50°44′29″N 2°41′35″E
- Country: France
- Region: Hauts-de-France
- Department: Nord
- Arrondissement: Dunkerque
- Canton: Bailleul
- Intercommunality: CA Cœur de Flandre

Government
  - Mayor (2020–2026): Elizabeth Boulet
- Area^{1}: 18.44 km^{2} (7.12 sq mi)
- Elevation: 44 m (144 ft)
- Highest elevation: 150 m (490 ft)
- Lowest elevation: 20 m (66 ft)
- Population (2023): 2,231
  - Density: 121.0/km^{2} (313.4/sq mi)
- Demonym: Méterennois (es)
- Time zone: UTC+01:00 (CET)
  - Summer (DST): UTC+02:00 (CEST)
- INSEE/Postal code: 59401 /59270
- ^{1} French Land Register data, which excludes lakes, ponds, glaciers > 1 km^{2} (0.386 sq mi or 247 acres) and river estuaries.

Méteren (French pronunciation: [metʁɛn]; from Flemish; Meteren in modern Dutch spelling) is a commune in the Nord department in northern France. In October 1914, the British army passed through Meteren during the Race to the Sea, and the future Field-Marshal Montgomery of Alamein received a DSO at the rank of Lieutenant.

== Population ==
Historical population
Year	Pop.	±% p.a.
1968	1,655	—
1975	1,736	+0.68%
1982	1,979	+1.89%
1990	2,000	+0.13%
1999	2,114	+0.62%
2007	2,159	+0.26%
2012	2,152	−0.06%
2017	2,314	+1.46%
2023	2,231	−0.61%
Source: INSEE

== Heraldry ==
Arms of Méteren	The arms of Méteren are blazoned : Gules, 2 keys in saltire respectant argent, overall on an inescutcheon Or, 3 horns sable, tied gules.

== See also ==
- Communes of the Nord department
