= Flêtre =

Flêtre Vleteren
- Commune
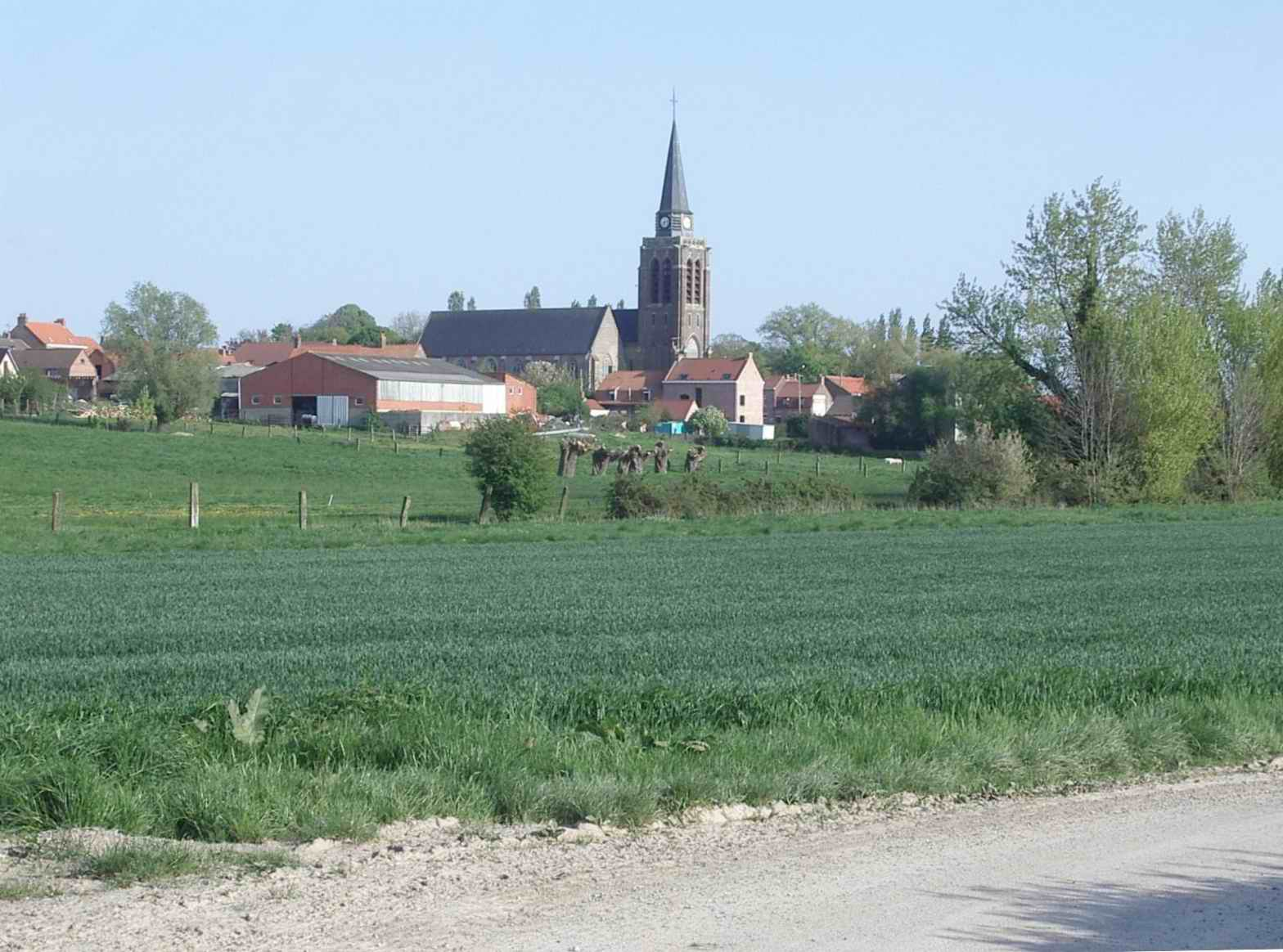
- A general view of Flêtre

- Coat of arms
- Location of Flêtre
- Location within France Location within Hauts-de-France
- Coordinates: 50°45′14″N 2°38′51″E
- Country: France
- Region: Hauts-de-France
- Department: Nord
- Arrondissement: Dunkerque
- Canton: Bailleul
- Intercommunality: CA Cœur de Flandre

Government
  - Mayor (2020–2026): Philippe Masquelier
- Area^{1}: 8.98 km^{2} (3.47 sq mi)
- Elevation: 47 m (154 ft)
- Highest elevation: 88 m (289 ft)
- Lowest elevation: 26 m (85 ft)
- Population (2023): 923
  - Density: 103/km^{2} (266/sq mi)
- Demonym: Flêtrois(es)
- Time zone: UTC+01:00 (CET)
  - Summer (DST): UTC+02:00 (CEST)
- INSEE/Postal code: 59237 /59270
- ^{1} French Land Register data, which excludes lakes, ponds, glaciers > 1 km^{2} (0.386 sq mi or 247 acres) and river estuaries.

Flêtre (French pronunciation: [flɛtʁ]; from Dutch: Vleteren) is a commune in the Nord department in northern France.

Bertenacre Military Cemetery, a British military cemetery with casualties from both world wars, is located three kilometers north of Flêtre.

== Heraldry ==
Arms of Flêtre	The arms of Flêtre are blazoned : Argent, 3 demi-fleurs de lys gules.

== See also ==
- Communes of the Nord department
