= Eecke =

Eecke Eke
- Commune
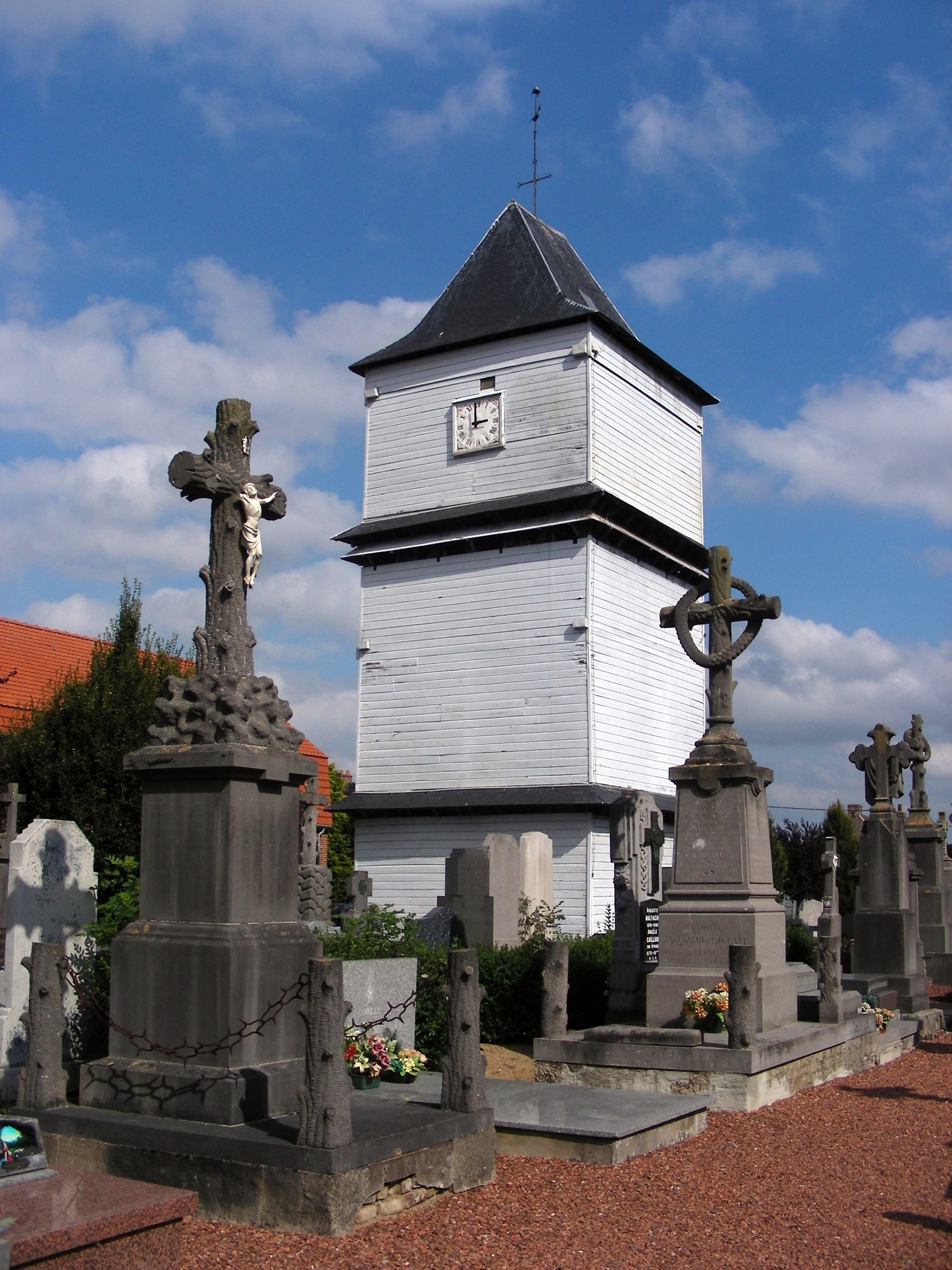
- The clock tower in Eecke

- Coat of arms
- Location of Eecke
- Location within France Location within Hauts-de-France
- Coordinates: 50°46′45″N 2°35′40″E
- Country: France
- Region: Hauts-de-France
- Department: Nord
- Arrondissement: Dunkerque
- Canton: Bailleul
- Intercommunality: CA Cœur de Flandre

Government
  - Mayor (2020–2026): Jacques Nuns
- Area^{1}: 10.29 km^{2} (3.97 sq mi)
- Elevation: 46 m (151 ft)
- Highest elevation: 66 m (217 ft)
- Lowest elevation: 24 m (79 ft)
- Population (2023): 1,213
  - Density: 117.9/km^{2} (305.3/sq mi)
- Demonym(s): Eeckois, Eeckoises
- Time zone: UTC+01:00 (CET)
  - Summer (DST): UTC+02:00 (CEST)
- INSEE/Postal code: 59189 /59114
- ^{1} French Land Register data, which excludes lakes, ponds, glaciers > 1 km^{2} (0.386 sq mi or 247 acres) and river estuaries.

Eecke (French pronunciation: [ɛk]; from Flemish; Eke in modern Dutch spelling) is a commune in the Nord department in northern France.

It is 7 km (4.3 mi) northeast of Hazebrouck.

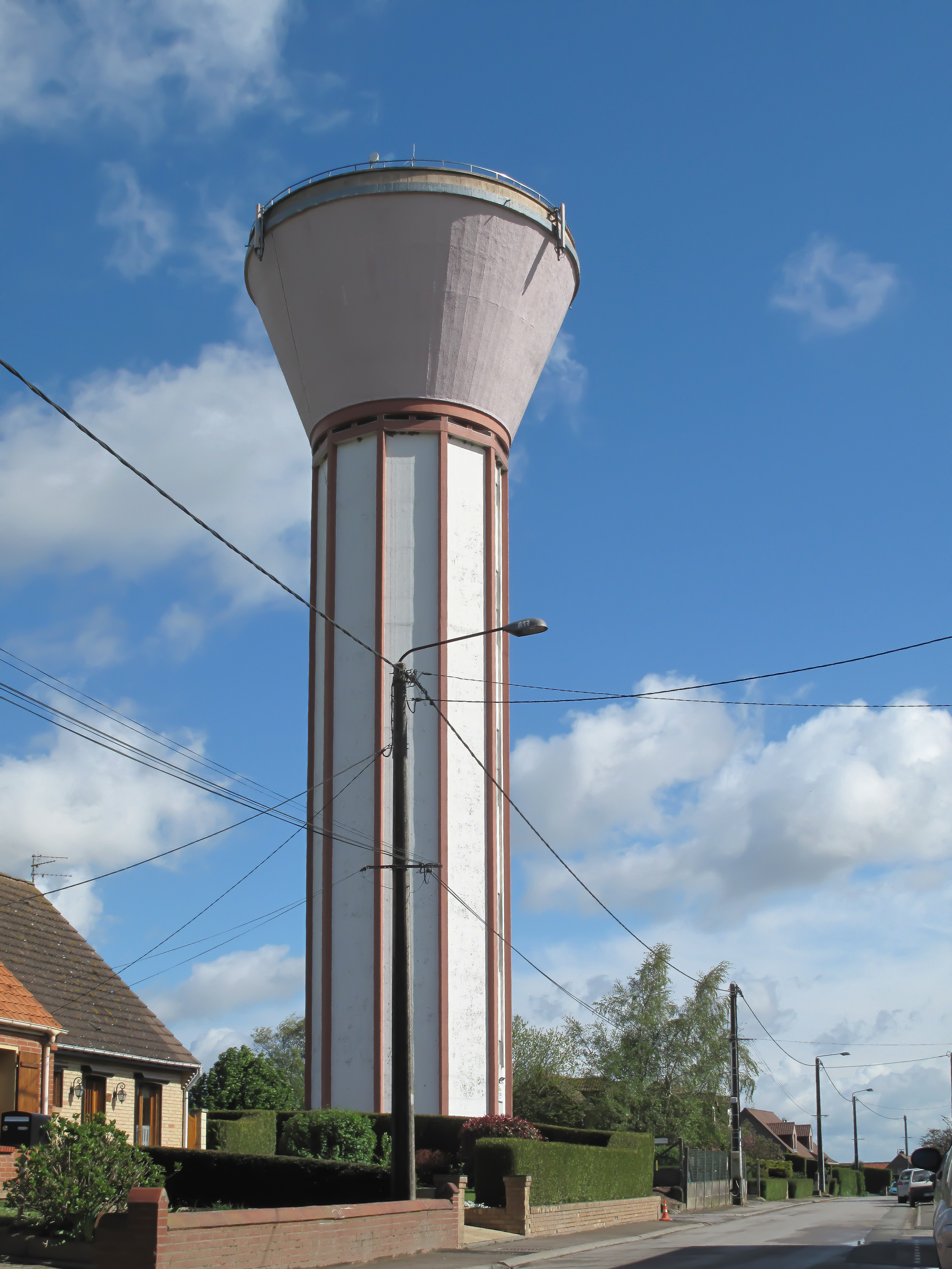
Eecke, watertower

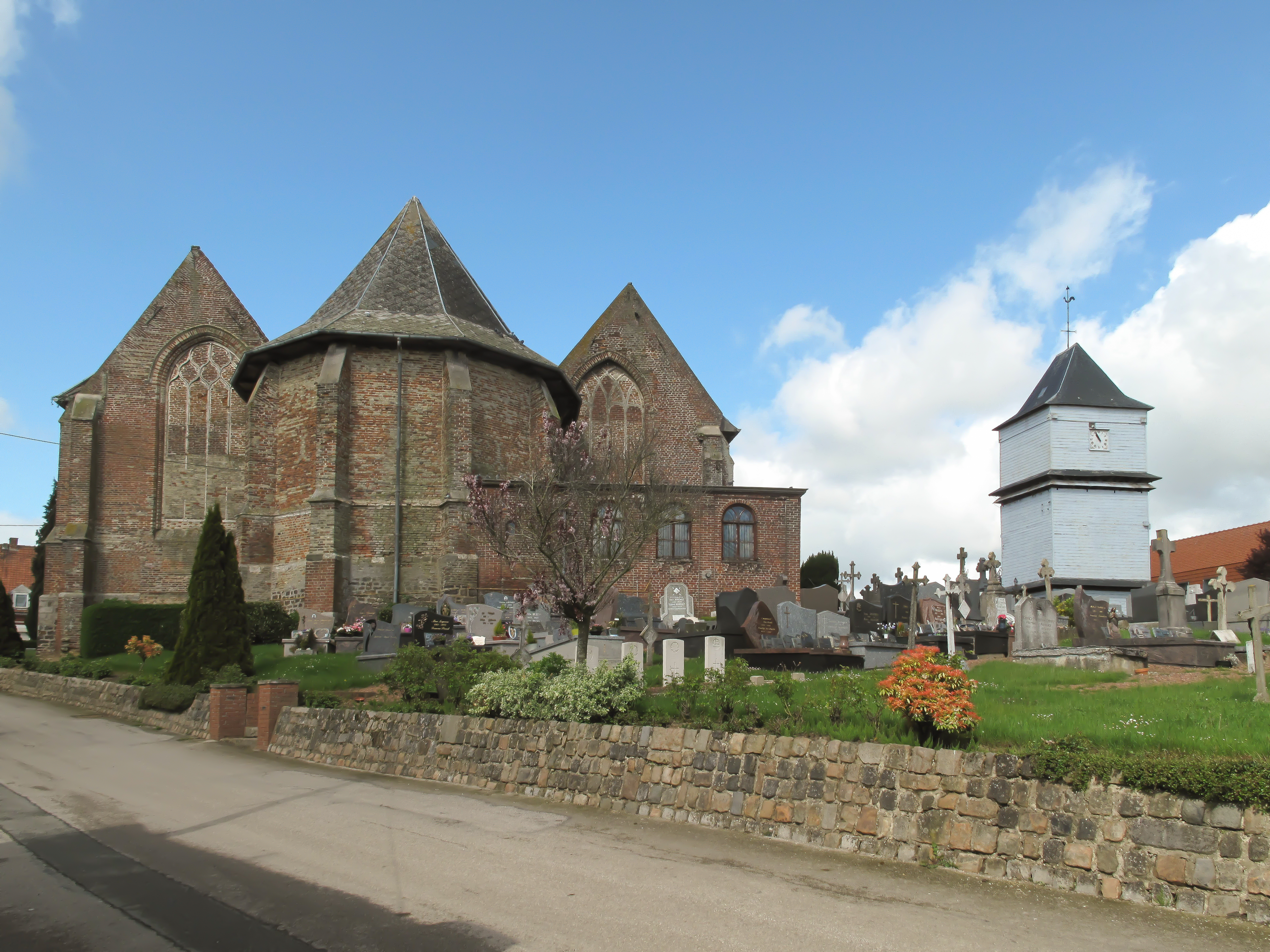
Eecke, church: l'église Saint Wulmar et le Klockhuis

== Heraldry ==
Arms of Eecke	The arms of Eecke are blazoned : Gules, a saltire vair. (Le Doulieu and Eecke use the same arms.)

== See also ==
- Communes of the Nord department
