= Germanic toponymy =

Names given to places by Germanic peoples

Germanic toponyms are the names given to places by Germanic peoples and tribes. Besides areas with current speakers of Germanic languages, many regions with previous Germanic speakers or Germanic influence had or still have Germanic toponymic elements, such as places in France, Wallonia, Poland, Western Russia, Northern Portugal, Spain and Northern Italy.

== Comparative table ==
In round brackets, the contemporary cognate for the toponym in the respective language is given. In the square brackets, the most frequently used name in English is given.

Proto-Germanic (or ancient loan word from Celtic, Greek or Latin)	English and Scots	Dutch and Afrikaans	Low German	(High) German	Continental North Germanic (Danish, Norwegian, Swedish)	Other Germanic languages	Loans or remnants in non-Germanic languages (mainly in Old Northern French)
*baki "creek"	-bach, -beck, -batch, -brook, -brooke, -bech, -beach, -broke, (beck) (1) Harbrook, Emm Brook, Sparkbrook, Walbrook, Marshbrook, Fullabrook, Sandbach, Comberbach, Brinsabach, Eastbach, etc., (2) Fulbeck, (3) Caldbeck, (4) Holbeck, Wansbeck, Starbeck, Welbeck, Skirpenbeck, Boosbeck, Killingbeck, Pinchbeck, Purbeck, Birkbeck, Swaffham Bulbeck, Leigh Beck, Waterbeck, etc., Pulverbatch, Inglesbatch, Oxbatch, Snailbatch, Wagbatch, Radbatch, Wisbech, Holbeach, Holbeck, Holbrook, Addenbrooke, Kidbrooke, Holbech, Bolingbroke, Stradbroke, Begbroke, Kembroke Hall, Hazelbadge, Burbage, Brocton, Brockweir, Brogden, Brookhampton, Brookland, Brooksby etc.	-beek (beek) (5) Boutersem, Bierbeek, Lembeek, Schaarbeek [Schaerbeek], Sint-Jans-Molenbeek, Oosterbeek, Eerbeek, Beek en Donk	-bek, -beck, -brook, -brock, (1) de:Harbrook, de:Billbrook, Hilkenbrook, Wesuwer Brook, de:Marschbrook, de:Hammerbrook, (2) Fuhlbek (Wehrau (river)), Reinbek, Wandsbek, Hasselbeck, Gladbeck, Havixbeck, Fuhlenbrock, Batenbrock, etc.	-bach, -bock de:Sandbach, (6) Wambach, (5) Rohrbach, (3) Kaltenbach, Hasselbach, Bütgenbach (Belgium), de: Schnellbach, Mühlbock [Ołobok], etc.	-beck, -bekk, -bäck, -bæk (2) Fulebæk (DK), (4) Holbæk (DK)		-bec, -becq, -bais, -baix, -bez in Northern French, via Old Norse bekkr, Old Frankish *baki (2) Foulbec, (3) Caudebec, (4) Houlbec, etc., (5) Robecq / Rebecq/ Rebais, etc., (6) Wambez, Roubaix, Bolbec, Bricquebec, etc.; -bok in Polish, via East-Germanic Drybok, Klodobok, Lusobok, Ołobok
*berga- "hill, mountain"	-bergh -berrow -barrow -berry -berge -bear (barrow); Sedbergh, Thrybergh, Caldbergh, Bedbergh, Babergh Hundred, Rubergh Hundred, East Bergholt, Bergh Apton, Berghersh, Inkberrow, Bromsberrow, Sedgeberrow, Whitbarrow, Cruckbarrow, Fellbarrow, Wanbarrow, Brockenbarrow, Inkberrow, Rowberrow, Ingleberry, Skelberry, Solberge, Sadberge, Thurlbear	-berg, -bergen (berg) (2) Bergen [Mons], Geraardsbergen, Grimbergen, Kortenberg, Schaarsbergen	(1) Barg, (2) Bargen	-berg Heidelberg, Kaisersberg [Kaysersberg], Königsberg [Kaliningrad], Nürnberg [Nuremberg], Bamberg, Bromsberg, Bromberg, Kruckenberg, de:Fellberg, Berghain	-berg, -berj (2) Bergen		-bergue(s) in Northern French via Old Low Frankish or Old Saxon; Isbergues, (1) Berck, Barques, Barc, Bierges
*brugjō- "bridge"	-bridge -brigg (bridge); Cambridge, Knightsbridge, Woodbridge, Fordingbridge, Seabridge, Weybridge, Uxbridge, Agbrigg, Felbrigg, Lambrigg, Gillingbrigg, Brigg, Brigroyd	-brugge (brug); Brugge [Bruges], Zeebrugge		-brücken, -brück, -bruck -brig Innsbruck, Osnabrück, Saarbrücken, Brig	-bro, -bru Hobro, Holstebro, Nybro, Örebro		
*burg- "city, fortified town, fort"	-borough, -bury, -burgh, -brough (borough); Canterbury, Tilbury, Aldbury, Grimsbury, Limbury, Cissbury, Kentisbury, Holmbury St Mary, Shoeburyness, Irthlingborough, Peterborough, Knaresborough, Middlesbrough, Hemingbrough, Mickleburgh, Aldeburgh, Rumburgh, Happisburgh, Bamburgh, Edinburgh, Salsburgh, Pedlersburgh, Cunningsburgh, Mayburgh Henge	-burg (burg, burcht); Aardenburg, Limburg, Middelburg, Tilburg	-borg Hamborg [Hamburg]	-burg Burg bei Magdeburg, Regensburg, Neuburg, Salzburg, German: Straßburg, Lower Elsassish/Alsatian-German: Strossburi, Luxembourgish -buerg Lëtzebuerg [Luxembourg]	-borg, -borj Nordborg, Rendsborg, Sønderborg		-bourg in Northern French, via Old Saxon, Old English, Old Norse and German; Cherbourg, Cabourg, Bourbourg, le Neubourg, Luxembourg, Strasbourg (single Bourg, Borgo, Buergo, etc. or with a following element are common everywhere in the Romance speaking world)
*felthuz "plain, open land, field"	-field -fold (field); Huddersfield, Mansfield, Macclesfield, Mirfield, Wakefield, Sheffield, Moorfields, Dogmersfield, Aperfield, Archenfield, Kerfield, Whisterfield, Bentfield Green, Bloomfield, Westerfield, Summerfield, Thunderfield, Bassingfield, Lindfield, Englefield Green, Exfold, Penfold, Chiddingfold	-veld Schinveld, Warnsveld		-feld, -felde, -filde (Feld); Bielefeld, Mansfeld, de:Moorfeld, de:Mirfeld, de:Westerfilde, Sommerfeld, Urfeld, de:Eichsfeld			
*furdi-, *furdu- "low water crossing"	-ford, -forth (ford); Bradford, Guildford, Oxford, Stafford, Watford, Hereford, Sandford, Thetford, Stanford, Arford, Conford, Lemsford, Hannaford, Filford, Wyfordby, Catford, Gosforth, Garforth, Stainforth, Ampleforth, Handforth, Dishforth, Catforth, Shawforth, Birdforth, Yafforth, Hollowforth, Strafforth, Hartforth, Bedford -firth (firth); Burrafirth, Holmfirth, Firth of Forth	-foort, -voort, -voorde (voorde); Amersfoort, Vilvoorde, Eexter-Zandvoort, Zandvoorde, Papenvoort, Westervoort	-ford, -fordt, -vörde, -forde Herford, de:Herzford, Bremervörde, de:Diersfordt, de:Conneforde, Osterforde, Lemförde, Buttforde, Bökenförde -forth de:Steinforth, de:Bruneforth, de:Kaiforth, de:Honigforth, de:Achelforth, de:Stallforth, Braunsforth	-furt Dietfurt, Erfurt, Frankfurt, Ochsenfurt, Steinfurt,	-fjord(en); Oslofjorden, Limfjord		-fort Northern French Houllefort
*hafnō- "harbor, port"	-haven "-avon" (haven); Shellhaven, Sandhaven, Buckhaven, Newhaven, Whitehaven, Greenhaven, Peacehaven, Cockhaven, Middlehaven, Stonehaven, Littlehaven, Fairhaven, Balhaven, Cuckmere Haven, Orwell Haven, Holland Haven, Anton Haven, Cuckhold's Haven, Milford Haven, East Haven, Sun Haven	-haven (haven); Eemshaven, Ketelhaven, Delfshaven	-haven (haven); Bremerhaven, Wilhelmshaven, Cuxhaven	-hafen (Hafen); Friedrichshafen	-hamn, -havn København [Copenhagen], Åkrahamn	Faroese: -havn Tórshavn, Skudeneshavn	French Le Havre, several le Hable
*haima- "homestead, dwelling"	-ham, -om (home); Denham, Dunham, Newham, Nottingham, Rotherham, Tottenham, Ickenham, Twickenham, Sydenham, Dagenham, Alkham, Wokingham, Manningham, Edmondsham, Kirkham, Gotham, Egham, Debenham, Bassingham, Foxham, Great Blakenham, Berkhamsted, Walthamstow, Ebbisham, Epsom, Wilsom, Besom, Hollom, Hysom, Allum Green, Cocum, Hoccum, Cottam, Hannam's Hall, Ednam, Dagnam Park, Buckinghamshire, Bodiam, Northiam, Mitchum	-(g)em, -(h)em, -en, -um -ham (heem, heim); Alphen, Berchem, Nossegem, Wevelgem, Zaventem, Blijham, Kolham, Dongjum (Donningham), Drogeham, Foxham, Blankenham, Den Ham, Schophem, Dalhem	-um, Alkersum, Nordenham, Bochum, Borkum, Wilsum, Walsum, Fulerum, Loccum, Arnum Bolzum, Achtum, Heyersum, Westernam	-(h)am,-heim, -(h)em, -um (Heim); Crailsheim, Kirchham, Hausham, de:Hundham, de:Borkerham, Mannheim, Pforzheim, Schiltigheim, Bassenheim, Hildesheim, Cochem, Waldhambach, Babensham, Egglham	-heim, -hem, -um, Trondheim, Varnhem, Lerum	Unknown East-Germanic language: *Boiohaimum [Bohemia]	-ham, -hem, -ain, -[s]ent in Northern French via Old Low Frankish, Old Norse or Old English; Ouistreham, Étréham, Huppain, Surrain (Surrehain 11th century, then Surreheim 12th century), Inxent (Flemish Enessem)
*hufa- "enclosed area, garden"	-hope, -hop -op -hove Woolhope, Stanhope, Mithope, Bullinghope, Byerhope, Dinchope, Dryhope, Longhope, Mythop, Northop, Middop, Glossop, Worksop, Warsop, Hove	-hof, -hoven, -hove (hof); Wintershoven, Zonhoven, Volckerinckhove, Hove	-hoft, Bockhoft, Ahrenshoft	-hof, -hofen (Hof); Bechhofen, Diedenhofen [Thionville]	-hof, -hoff		(translated into -court in Northern France, compare Bettenhoven, Bettenhoff with Bettencourt, Bethancourt, etc.)
*hulmaz "elevation, hill, island"	-holm, -holme, -hulme (holm); Grassholm, Denholm, Buckholm, Marholm, Bromholm Priory, Killingholme, Hempholme, Skokholm, Nunburnholme, Hubberholme, Skyreholme, Holmsgarth, Holmwrangle, Holmethorpe, Holmbush, Holmwood, Holmsted, Holmegate, Steep Holm, Cobholm, Levenshulme, Kirkmanshulme	-holm (holm); De Holm	-holm (holm); Holm, Holm	-holm (holm); Holm, Holm	-holm (holm); Stockholm, Holm	Faroese: -hólmur (hólmur); Gáshólmur	-homme, le Houlme, le Hom in Old Norman; Robehomme, le Houlme
W.Gmc. *kirika from Greek kyriakon, "Lord's assembly"	-kirk (church); Colkirk, Falkirk, Ormskirk, Chadkirk, Peakirk, Romaldkirk, Halkirk, Woodkirk, Algarkirk, Laithkirk, Whitkirk, Oswaldkirk, Bradkirk Hall, Houndkirk Moor, Kirkcambeck, Kirkcudbright, Kirkwall, Kirkby, kirklees, Whitchurch, Stokenchurch, Baschurch, Dymchurch, Hornchurch, Offchurch, Kenderchurch, Churchover, Churchstoke, Churcham	-kerk, -kerke (kerk); Duinkerke (Dunkirk), Middelkerke, Nijkerk, Ridderkerk, Koudekerk aan den Rijn, Adinkerke, Koolkerke, Kaaskerke, Klemskerke, Grijpskerk, Oldekerk, Niekerk	-kerk, (Kirche); Aldekerk	-kirche, -kirchen (Kirche); Feldkirch, Neunkirchen, Gelsenkirchen, Kirchweyhe, Kirchham	-kirke, -kyrkje, -kjerke Kyrkjebø		-crique, -kerque in Northern French; Yvecrique, Criquetot, Dunkerque (Dunkirk)
*landom "land, ground, soil"	-land (land); England, Ireland, Scotland, Sunderland, Northumberland, Shetland, Lothingland, Bishop Auckland, Holland, Breckland, Upholland, Rutland, Hartland, Kessingland, Westmorland, Heligoland, Leyland, Buckland, Kingsland, Westlands, West Midlands, Fenland, Litherland, Thurgoland, Dormansland, Leesland, Thurland Castle, Backaland, West Heogaland, Swaisland, Wringsland, Sealand, Ecklands, Austerlands, Maylandsea	-land (land); Friesland, Holland, Nederland [Netherlands], Zeeland, Gelderland, Westland, Nuland, Dirksland, Duiveland, Sint Philipsland, Flevoland, Hamaland, Heuvelland, Rilland, Kempenland, Reiderland, Engeland, Nieuwlande, Lageland, Pajottenland	-land (land)	-land (land); Deutschland [Germany], Sudetenland, Moormerland, Wangerland, Blockland, Holtland, Ammerland, Sauerland, Westerland, Saarland, Seeland, Münsterland, Vierlande, Emsland, Burg-Reuland, Rheinland, Carinerland, Muttland, Südbrookmerland, Thurland, Neuholland, Oberneuland, Helgoland, Baselland, Arelerland	-land (land); Jylland [Jutland], Sjælland [Zealand], Nordland, Hjelmeland, Jørpeland, Iveland, Froland, Hogland [Gogland], Oppland		-land, -lan in Northern French château d'Ételan, Heuland, le Tingland, le Vatland, etc.
*rotha "clearing"	-royd, -rode, -rod, -rith, -road, -royde Ackroyd, Murgatroyd, Kebroyd, Hangingroyd, Boothroyd, Oldroyd, Mytholmroyd, Dockroyd, Odd Rode, Bergerode, North Rode, Wivelrod, Blackrod, Heyrod, Gollinrod, Ormerod, Harrod, Walkerith, Huntroyde Hall, Cockroad	-rade, -ray, -rode, -rooi (rode); Asenray, Gijzenrooi, Landsrade, Middelrode, Nieuwrode, Nistelrode, Sint-Genesius-Rode, Stamproy, Kerkrade		-rade, -rath, -rode, -roth -rod -rith Overath, Radebeul, Radevormwald, Roth, Wernigerode, Heyerode, Darlingerode, Ivenrode, Hainrode, Rainrod, Rumrod, Wallmerod, Karith, Herzogenrath	-rud, -rød, -röd, -ryd, -rue -rui Buskerud, Birkerød, Kajerød, Bergeröd, Tolvsrød		Rœulx, Rœux, Ruitz in Northern French Swiss: Cormérod (Kormerat)
*stainaz "stone"	-stan, -stam, -stein, -stone (stone); Stanlow, Stanmore, Stanfree, Stanground, Stambermill, Waterstein, Dangstein, Stamford, Stonehaven, Staines, Stanwick, Stenhousemuir	-steen (steen); Steenokkerzeel, Steenwijk	-steen (steen); Sleswig-Holsteen [Schleswig-Holstein]	-stein (Stein); Schleswig-Holstein, Stein, Steinfurt, Stein-Wingert	-sten, -stein		-stain, -étan in Northern French; Grestain, Roche Gélétan, Étaimpuis, Estaimpuis (Dutch Steenput)
*thurpa- "farm, settlement"	-thorp, -thorpe -throp -trop -thrup -drup -drop Cleethorpes, Scunthorpe, Mablethorpe, Casthorpe, Catthorpe, Boothorpe, Ibthorpe, Cutthorpe, Swanthorpe, Ingmanthorpe, Copmanthorpe, Thorpeness, Burthrop(Eastleach Martin), Heythrop, Winthrop, Colethrop, Casthrope House, Knostrop, Wilstrop, Westrop, Etrop, Upthrup, Pindrup, Staindrop, Newdrop, Souldrop, Burdrop, Huntingdrop, Hilldrop, Throop	-dorp (dorp); Hazerswoude-Dorp, Opdorp	-dorp, -trop (dorp); Dusseldorp [Düsseldorf], Bottrop, Waltrop, Frintrop, Uentrop, Hiltrop, Castrop-Rauxel, Huttrop	-dorf, -torf (Dorf); Dorf	-torp, -arp, -rup Kattarp, Kastrup, Olofstorp	Lorrain -troff Bénestroff (German Bensdorf)	-tourp(s), -tour, Torp in Old Norman; Clitourps, Saussetour, le Torp-Mesnil
Lat vīcus "dwelling place, village" *wīhsą "village, settlement"	-wich Ipswich, Norwich, Harwich, Aldwych, Lower Ledwyche, Lutwyche Hall, Heckmondwike, Warwick, Alnwick, Gatwick, Lerwick, Hawick, Fenwick, Berwick, Gippeswyk Park, Walwick, Glodwick, Hardwicke, Rumboldswyke, Ankerwycke Yew, Lowick, Shopwyke, Casewick, Borthwick, Breiwick, Edgwick, Keckwick, Muggleswick, Osbaldwick, Barnoldswick, Smethwick, Withernwick, Plardiwick, Sesswick, Marwick Hall, Wick, Hamwick Green, Hackney Wick, East wick, Feldwicke Cottage, Marchweeke, Northweek, Highweek,	-wijk (wijk); Ewijk, Waalwijk, Harderwijk, Oisterwijk, Noordwijk, Beverwijk, Noorderwijk, Meeswijk, Wervik, Wijk bij Duurstede, Kootwijk, Rijswijk	-wig, -wich -wick Sleswig-Holsteen [Schleswig-Holstein], Kettwig, Dellwig, Sleswick, Brunswick, de:Suderwich, de:Suderwick, Schüttwich, Oer-Erkenschwick, de:Berwicke, Lowick, de:Harwick, de:Crosewick, de:Ellewick, de:Wennewick, de:Holtwick, de:Kockelwick, de:Marwick, Am Halswick, Feldwicker Weg	-wig, -wiek (Weich); Schleswig-Holstein, Prorer Wiek, Wyk			Craywick, Salperwick, French Flanders
*walhaz "stranger, non-Germanic person"	wal- (Welsh); Cornwall, Wales, Walsall, Walsden	wal- (Waal); Wallonië [Wallonia]		wal- Wallis [Valais] Welschneudorf		Unknown Germanic language: Wallachia	Germanic wal- became: gal- in Gaelic, via Old English Galloway; gaul- in French, via Frankish Gaul
*walþuz "forest"	-wold Easingwold, Hockwold, Southwold	-woud Renswoude, Spaarnwoude	-wold Finsterwolde, Schildwolde	-wald Greifswald, Waldkirch, Schwarzwald [Black Forest]	-voll ("meadow"); Tingvoll		

== East Germanic ==
=== Southern France ===
The Goths left toponymic traces in France, particularly in the south, however towards Savoy and further north of the Alps it was the Burgundians who also spoke an East Germanic language.

- Escatalens, Gascony, from Skatalo + -ing
- Tonneins (Tonnencs 1197; Tonninge 1253), Gascony, from Tunno + -ing

=== Spain ===
Iberia was mostly occupied by the Visigothic Kingdom from the 5th to the 8th century, in which the ruling classes spoke the East Germanic language Gothic. A limited number of Germanic-derived place-names survive in Spain. Examples include:

- Berja, Andalusia, from berg ("mountain").
- Bormujos, Andalusia, from Gothic bormo-ios ("hot waters").
- Broto, Aragon, from Gothic brud ("bud shoots").
- Burgos, Castile and León, from Gothic baurgs ("barricade of wagos").
- Guardo, Castile and León, from wardjon ("watch-point").
- Lobio, Galicia, from Gothic lubja ("vine bower").

== North Germanic ==
=== Denmark ===
Proto-Norse is documented in Denmark as far back as 400 AD. As is general in Scandinavian countries, Denmark's toponymy is characterised by uniformity, as the country did not experience language changes during the period in which the names were given; thus the languages that gave rise to the oldest names, Proto-Germanic and Proto-Nordic, are the direct precursors of the languages Old Norse and Old Danish in which the later names were coined.

=== Norway ===
The vast majority of place-names in Norway were coined in the North Germanic language Norwegian. Several place-name formations occur repeatedly throughout Norway.

- Gullhaug, Akershus
- Gullhaug, Vestfold

From gull ("gold") + haug ("mound").

- Hovden, Agder
- Hovden, Nordland
- Hovden, Vestland

From hovud ("head, steep cliff").

- Stormyra, Akershus
- Stormyra, Bodø
- Stormyra, Troms

From stor ("big, large") + myr ("bog, mire"). Stormyra is most common place-name formation in Norway.

- Tveit (Åmli), Agder
- Tveit (Bygland), Agder

From tveit ("clearing") (cf. thwaite)

=== Republic of Ireland ===
- Leixlip, County Kildare, from Old Norse laxhlaupr ("salmon's leap").
- Wexford, County Wexford, from Old Norse Veisafjǫrðr ("fjord/inlet of the mudlats").

=== Russia ===
- Russia itself, from Medieval Latin Russi ("the people of Russia"), ultimately from Old Norse roðr ("steering oar").
- Suzdal, Vladimir Oblast, possibly derived from (Merya *SōrjoGi ("gravel river") +) Old Norse dalr ("dale, valley").
- Trongzund, Leningrad Oblast (settlement renamed Vysotsk) from trång ("narrow") + sund ("strait) (cf. Trångsund, Sweden).
- Vyborg, Leningrad Oblast, from Old Swedish, Old East Norse véborg ("holy fort") (cf. Viborg, Denmark).

=== Normandy ===
The Duchy of Normandy in modern-day France had its roots in the early 10th century, when the Scandinavian Viking leader Rollo became a vassal of the King of the West Franks, Charles III and, in exchange for homage, acquired territory on the lower Seine. The area was subject to significant Scandinavian settlement. One legacy of such settlement is a body of place-names derived from the North Germanic language Old Norse. Such names include:

- Carquebut, La Manche, from Old Norse kirkju-bȳr ("church farm").
- Clitourps, La Manche, from Old Norse klif-torp ("cliff farm") (cf. Cleethorpes, Lincolnshire)
- Dieppe, Seine-Maritime, from djupr ("deep") + á ("river").
- Dieppedalle, Seine-Maritime
- Saint-Vaast-Dieppedalle, Seine-Maritime

Both from Old Norse djuprdalr ("deep valley") (cf. Deepdale, Yorks, England).

- Ectot, Eure
- Ectot, Seine-Maritime
- Ectot-l'Auber, Seine-Maritime
- Ectot-les-Baons, Seine-Maritime

All from Old Norse eski ("ash tree") + toft ("rural estate").

- Lengronne, La Manche, from Old Norse lyngr ("heath") + grund ("gravely expanse").
- Oudalle, Seine-Maritime, from Old Norse ulfr ("wolf") (or a personal name derived from it) + dalr ("valley") (cf. Uldale, Cumb., England).
- Le Thuit-Anger, Eure
- Thuit-Hébert, Eure
- Le Thuit-Signol, Eure
- Le Thuit-Simer, Eure

All from Old Norse þveit ("clearing") (cf. -thwaite).

- Torp, Calvados
- Le Torpt, Eure
- Le Tourps, Manche

From Old Norse torp ("farm").

- Tostes, Eure
- Tôtes, Siene-Maritime

Both from Old Norse toft ("rural estate, dwelling").

=== United Kingdom ===
==== England ====
In the 9th and 10th centuries, some parts of Northern, Midland and Eastern England formed a part of the Danelaw, an area of England which formed a confederacy under the Kingdom of Denmark and was subject to Scandinavian settlement. As a result, place-names containing North Germanic elements are common in much of the former Danelaw, especially in Lancashire, Yorkshire and the East Midland counties such as Leicestershire and Lincolnshire. North Germanic toponyms are also common in neighbouring parts of Durham, and in other areas of Norse influence, such as Cumberland and the Wirral Peninsula in Cheshire. The commonest Scandinavian place-name element in England is bȳr (-by) meaning "farm", with particular concentrations of the element in northern Yorkshire, Lincolnshire, Leicestershire, the Norfolk Broads and around Liverpool Bay. North Germanic place-names are rare in the West Midlands and most of southern England. Notable examples include:

- Byker, Northumberland, from Old Norse bȳr-kjarr ("farm marsh").
- Derby, Derbyshire, from Old Norse djúr-bȳr ("deer farm").
- Garstang, Lancashire, from Old Norse geirr-stǫng ("spear post").
- Gartree, Northamptonshire, from Old Norse geiri-tré ("tree on a triangual piece of land").
- Kirby Bellars, Leicestershire
- Kirby Cane, Norfolk
- Kirby-le-Soken, Essex
- Monks Kirby, Warwickshire

All from Old Norse kirkju-bȳr ("church farm").

- Kirkby-in-Ashfield, Nottinghamshire
- Kirkby Stephen, Westmorland
- Kirkby Thore, Westmorland

As with the "Kirby" group, all from kirkju-bȳr ("church farm").

- Leagram, Lancashire, from Old Norse leið-gríma ("trail blaze").
- Leake, Nottinghamshire, from Old Norse lœ´kr ("brook").
- Lowestoft, Suffolk, from Old Norse Hlothvers-toft ("Hlothver's plot").
- Sadberge, County Durham, from Old Norse setberg ("flat-topped hill").
- Scarborough, Yorkshire, from Old Norse Skarthiborg ("Skarthi's fort").
- Scole, Norfolk, from Old Norse skáli ("shielings").
- Scunthorpe, Lincolnshire, from Old Norse Skuma-þorp ("Skuma's outlying settlement").
- St Agnes, Cornwall, from hagi-nes ("pasture headland").
- Swinscoe, Staffordshire, from Old Norse svín-skógr ("swine wood").
- Swithland, Leicestershire, from Old Norse sviðinn-lundr ("grove cleared by burning").
- Thingwall, Cheshire, from Old Norse þing-vǫllr ("assembly field").
- Ulleskelf, Yorkshire, from Old Norse Ulfr-skelf ("Ulfr's shelf").
- Wing, Rutland, from Old Norse vengi.
- Witherslack, Westmorland, from Old Norse víðir-slakki ("wither (shallow) valley").
- Wreay, Cumberland, from Old Norse vrá ("nook").

==== Scotland ====
Place-names derived from the North Germanic language Old Norse have been established in Scotland since around the 9th century. There is a plurality of such names in Orkney and Shetland as these remained a part of the Kingdom of Norway until the 15th century, and the Norse daughter language Norn remained in use there until c. 1850. Norse toponyms are also frequent in the Hebrides, the Highlands and south-west Scotland, but are uncommon in most other regions. Norse place-names in Scotland include:

- Canonbie, Dumfriesshire, from Old Norse byr ("farm, village").
- Humbie, East Lothian, from Old Norse Hunda-byr ("Hunda's farm").
- Knoydart, Inverness-shire, from Old Norse Knútafjörðr ("Knut's fjord").
- Laxford, Sutherland, from Old Norse laxafjörðr ("salmon fjord").
- Lynedale, Inverness-shire (Skye), from Old Norse lín-dalr ("flax valley").
- Monkstadt, Inverness-shire (Skye), from Old Norse munkastaðr ("monk place").
- Moorfoot, Midlothian, from Old Norse mór ("moor") + þveit ("clearing").
- Sorbie, Wigtownshire, from saur ("mud") + býr ("farm, village").

==== Wales ====
- Fishguard, Pembrokeshire, from Old Norse fiskr-gardr ("fish yard").
- Milford Haven, Pembrokeshire, from Old Norse melrfjordr ("sand-band fjord/inlet") (+ haven).
- Skokholm, Pembrokeshire, from Old Norse stokkr-holmr ("island of the sound").
- Swansea, Glamorgan, from Old Norse Sveinnsey ("Svienn's island").

== West Germanic ==
=== France ===
France originates with the kingdom Francia of the 5th-9th centuries, which was established by the Germanic Franks. Some place-names in France originate in the Franks' West Germanic language Frankish (and the descendants of that language, Dutch and Flemish), and in other West Germanic languages.

- Achiet, from Germanic askit- ("ash-tree") (cf. Askwith).
- Audresselles, from Germanic sele ("dwelling").
- Bécourt, from Germanic bōku ("beech") + hultą ("wood").
- Broxeele, from broec-sele ("marsh dwelling") (cf. Brussels).
- Guerquesalles, from Germanic sele ("dwelling").
- Houllefort, from Germanic hohlfurt ("hollow ford").
- Rœux, from Germanic ruti ("clearing").
- Volckerinckhove, from Folkharding ("land of Folkhard") + hof ("farm").
- Warhem, from (Germanic personal name +) Frankish heim ("home").
- Warneton, from Germanic Warinas-tuna ("Warin's farm").

There are some place-names with Saxon or Old English etymologies in France (Normandy and Boulonnais), including:

- Vannecrocq, Eure, Old English croft ("piece of land").
- Vicques, Calvados (Wikes 1198; Wiches, undated) similar to Wix (Essex, Wikes in 1191; Wiches 1198) from Saxon or Old English wic "settlement, village" or "dairy farm".
- place-names in -vieu(x) in Bessin, Normandy :
  - Sommervieu (Summerveium) "summer wic"
- place-names in -ham :
  - Ouistreham (Bessin, Ostrehan 1066-1083, Oistreham 1082) similar to Westerham (Kent, Westarham 871 - 889, Oistreham 1086)

=== Galicia, northern Portugal, western Asturias ===
The Suevi spoke a West Germanic language: an Elbe Germanic or a Weser–Rhine Germanic language. They left some toponyms and male personal names included or not in the Romance toponyms.

- Calvos de Randín to Randini, genitive of Randinus
- Gomesende to Gumesindi, genitive of Gumesindus
- Rairiz de Veiga to Ragerici, genitive of Ragericus

=== Germany ===
Most place-names in Germany are derived from the West Germanic language German.

=== Italy ===
Northern Italy was settled in the 6th century AD by the Lombards, whose West Germanic language Lombardic was used in the region until around the 11th century AD. Some places in Italy have names of Lombardic origin, including:

- Bergamo, Lombardy, from Germanic bergheim ("mountain home").
- Valperga, Pietmont, from Lombardic berga ("mountain").

=== United Kingdom ===
==== England ====
The overwhelming majority of place-names in most parts of England are derived, at least in their present form, from the West Germanic language Old English, after that language became established in Britain during the Anglo-Saxon period (410–1066). For common Old English place-naming elements see the generic forms in place names in the British Isles. Some name-formations and simplexes occur repeatedly, and some prominent place-names have common Old English naming suffixes:

- Birmingham, from Old English Beorma-ingahām ("home of Beorma").
- Bradford, Yorkshire, from Old English brad-ford ("broad ford").
- Bristol, from Old English Bryċġ-stōw ("bridge place").
- Brough, Derbyshire
- Brough, East Riding of Yorkshire
- Brough, Westmorland

All from Old English burh ("fortified place") (cf. German burg).

- Bury, Huntingdonshire
- Bury, Lancashire
- Bury St Edmunds, Suffolk

As with the Brough names, from Old English burh ("fortified place").

- Heanor, Derbyshire, from Old English heah-ofer ("high ridge") (cf. Hanover, Germany).
- Preston, Lancashire
- Preston, Rutland
- Preston le Skene, County Durham
- Preston on Stour, Warwickshire
- Preston Patrick, Westmorland

All from Old English preost-tun ("priest farm/settlement").

- Stoke (Hayling Island), Hampshire
- Stoke (St Mary Bourne), Hampshire
- Stoke, Kent
- Stoke on Tern, Shropshire
- Stoke-on-Trent, Staffordshire

All from Old English stoc ("secondary settlement")

- Sunderland, City of Sunderland
- Sunderland, Cumberland
- Sunderland Bridge, County Durham

All from Old English sundor-land ("separate land").

- Warwick, Warwickshire, from Old English Wær-ing-wic ("dwelling of the weir").

==== Scotland ====
Many place-names in parts of Scotland are derived from Old English or its descendant languages such as Scots. This is particularly the case in the south-eastern counties of Scotland such as Berwickshire, East Lothian and Roxburghshire, which were part of the Anglian kingdom of Northumbria at its height in the early 8th century. Prominent examples include:

- Edinburgh, Midlothian, from Old English *Edynburg, with burg ("fort, stronghold"), a calque on the Cumbric name Din Eidyn.
- Gretna, Dumfriesshire, from Old English grēoten-hōh ("gravelly hill").
- Prestwick, Ayrshire, from Old English preostwic ("priest's dwelling").
- Wigtown, Wigtownshire, from Old English wigcton ("Wigca's farm").

Furthermore, there are a few place-names in Scotland derived from continental Germanic languages such as Dutch and German, mainly from the early modern period (16th-19th century):

- Friockheim, Angus, German heim added to an existing place-name.
- John O'Groats, Sutherland, from the Dutch personal name Jan De Groot ("John the large").

==== Wales ====
Place-names in Wales are overwhelmingly derived from the Celtic language Welsh or its predecessors, but a small number are of Old English origin. Examples include:

- Buckley, Flintshire, from Old English buccleah ("wood/clearing of the bucks").
- Haverfordwest, Pembrokeshire, from Old English heahfore-ford ("heifer ford") (+ west added later).
- Prestatyn, Denbighshire, from Old English preost-tūn ("homestead of the priest").

== See also ==
- Germanic names
  - Dutch names
  - German names
- Norman toponymy (includes Old Norse placenames in Normandy)
- German toponymy
- Celtic toponymy
- Placenames in the United Kingdom and Ireland
