= Gullhaug =

Gullhaug may refer to the following places in Norway:

- Gullhaug, Vestfold, in Holmestrand Municipality
- Gullhaug, Akershus, in Bærum Municipality
