= Kingsland =

Kingsland may refer to:

== Places ==
=== United Kingdom ===
==== Wales ====
- Kingsland, Anglesey, Wales

==== England ====
- Kingsland, Herefordshire, England
- Kingsland, London, England
  - Kingsland Basin
  - Kingsland Road
- Kingsland, Shropshire (Shrewsbury)
  - Kingsland Bridge

=== United States ===
- Kingsland, Arkansas
- Kingsland, Georgia
- Kingsland, Indiana
- Kingsland, New Jersey
- Kingsland Homestead New York City, NY
- Kingsland, Texas
- Kingsland (Chimney Corner, Virginia), listed on the National Register of Historic Places in Chesterfield County, Virginia

=== Elsewhere ===
- proposed alternative name for the Northern Territory, Australia, in 1912
- Kingsland, Barbados (in the parish of Christ Church, Barbados)
- Kingsland, Calgary, Alberta, Canada, a neighborhood
- Kingsland, New Zealand, suburb of Auckland
  - Kingsland railway station, New Zealand

== People ==
Kingsland is also a British surname.

- Ambrose Kingsland (1804–1878), mayor of New York City
- Gerald Kingsland (1930–2000), British writer
- Paddy Kingsland (born 1947), British composer

== See also ==
- Kingsland Road (band) (formerly Kingsland), English boy band
