= Bargen, Netherlands =

Bargen
- Hamlet
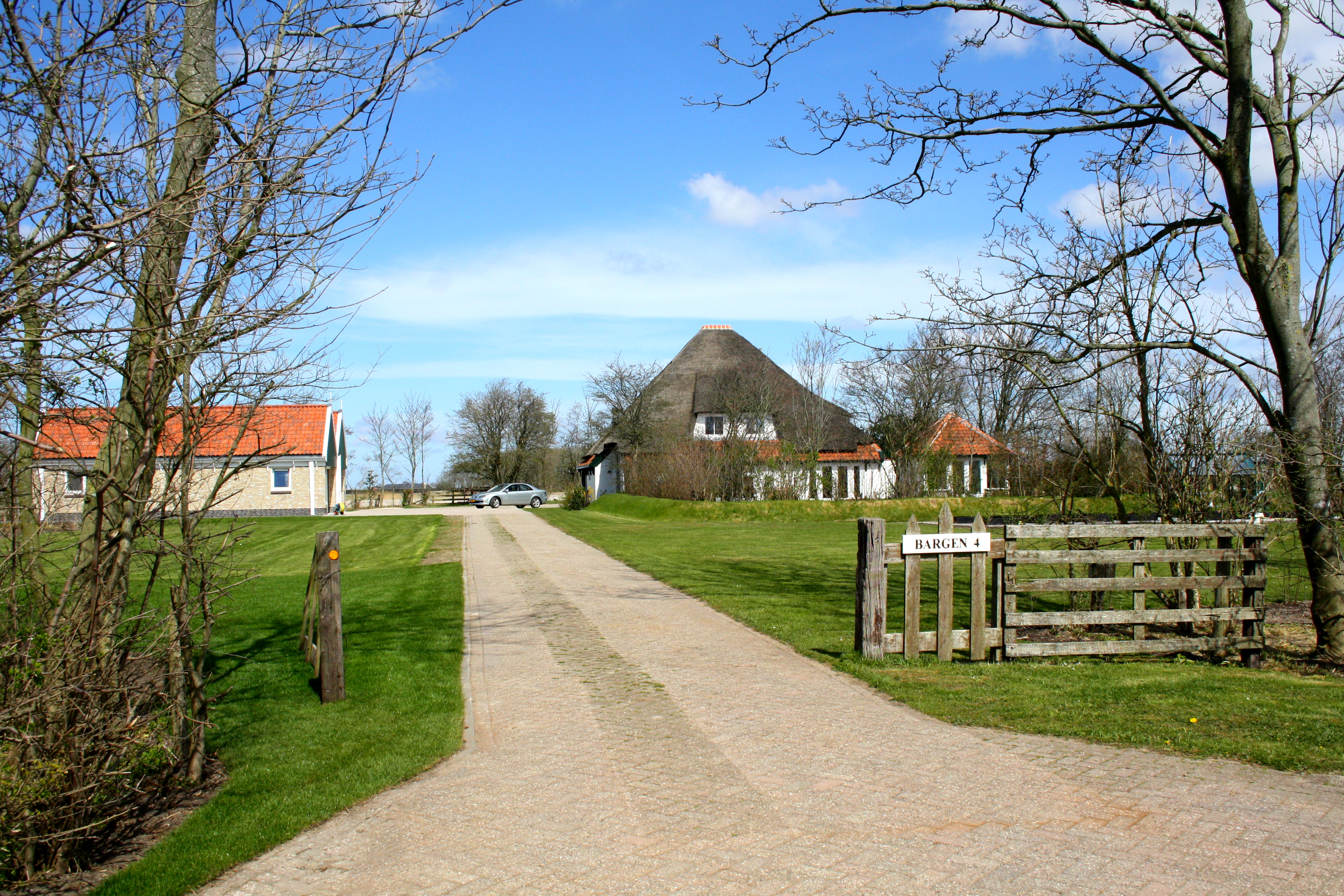
- Farm in Bargen

- Location in the Netherlands Location in the province of North Holland in the Netherlands
- Coordinates: 53°5′3″N 4°50′5″E
- Country: Netherlands
- Province: North Holland
- Municipality: Texel
- Elevation: 0.6 m (2.0 ft)
- Time zone: UTC+1 (CET)
  - Summer (DST): UTC+2 (CEST)
- Postal code: 1793
- Dialing code: 0222

Bargen (Dutch pronunciation: [ˈbɑrɣə(n)]) is a hamlet in the northwest Netherlands, on the island and in the municipality of Texel, North Holland. It is located 4 km northeast of Den Burg.

Bargen is not a statical entity, and the postal authorities have placed it under De Waal. It has no place name signs, and consists of a handful of houses.

In a tax register of 1561, Bargen was mentioned as having almost very poor soil.
