= Bargen =

Bargen may refer to:

== In Germany ==
- Helmstadt-Bargen, in the Rhein-Neckar district, Baden-Württemberg
- Rehm-Flehde-Bargen, in the Dithmarschen district, Schleswig-Holstein
- Bargen, Hegau, in the Konstanz district, Baden-Württemberg
- Bargen, Schleswig, in Erfde, in the Schleswig-Flensburg district, Schleswig-Holstein

== in Switzerland ==
- Bargen, Berne, in the canton of Bern
- Bargen, Schaffhausen, in the canton of Schaffhausen

== in the Netherlands ==
- Bargen, Netherlands, on the island of Texel
