= Niekerk =

Niekerk may refer to:

In Groningen, Netherlands:

- Niekerk, Het Hogeland, a village in the municipality of Het Hogeland
- Niekerk, Westerkwartier, a village in the municipality of Westerkwartier

== People with the surname ==
- Maurits Niekerk (1871–1940), Dutch painter

== See also ==
- Van Niekerk
