= Wambach =

Wambach is a German language name for streams, places and persons.

It may refer to:

== People ==
- Abby Wambach (born 1980), American soccer player
- Nel Wambach (born 1938), Dutch gymnast
- Peter Wambach (born 1946), American politician
- Achim Wambach (born 1968) is a German economist

== Places ==
- Wambach, several tributaries of the Traun (river), Austria
- Wambach, a community of Schlangenbad, Hesse, Germany
- Wambach, name for the upper course of the Frischebach, Rhineland, Germany
- Wambach, left tributary of the Odenbach (Glan), Rhineland, Germany
- Wambach, right tributary of the Prüm, Rhineland, Germany
- Wambach, a small village in Bavaria now part of the municipality of Taufkirchen (Vils)

== See also ==
- Wembach, village in Baden-Württemberg, Germany.
