= Addenbrooke =

Addenbrooke is a surname of English origin. People with this surname include:

- Alice Baltzelle Addenbrooke (1881–1972), American historian
- John Addenbrooke (philanthropist) (1680–1719), English doctor and benefactor of Addenbrooke's hospital
- John Addenbrooke (priest), Dean of Lichfield
- John Addenbrooke (footballer) (1900–61), English footballer
- Jack Addenbrooke (1865–1922), English football player and manager

== See also ==
- Addenbrooke's Hospital, Cambridge, England
- Addenbrooke's Charitable Trust (ACT), charity supporting the hospital
