= Kirkham =

Kirkham may refer to:

== Places ==
- Kirkham, Lancashire, England
- Kirkham, North Yorkshire, England
- Kirkham, New South Wales, Australia
- Kirkham (HM Prison), a prison in Lancashire, England
- Kirkham Priory
- Kirkham House

== Other uses ==
- Kirkham (surname)
- Curtiss 18 T, a World War I triplane also known as 'The Kirkham'.
