= Oldroyd =

Oldroyd is a surname. Notable people with the surname include:

- Brad Oldroyd (born 1973), Australian cricketer
- Darren Oldroyd (born 1966), English former footballer
- David R. Oldroyd (1936–2014), English-Australian historian of science
- Edgar Oldroyd (1888–1964), English cricketer
- Eleanor Oldroyd (born 1962), English sports broadcaster
- George Oldroyd (1887–1956), English organist and composer of Anglican church music
- Giles Oldroyd, professor at the University of Cambridge working on beneficial Legume symbioses
- Harold Oldroyd (1913–1978), British entomologist
- Ida Shepard Oldroyd (1856–1940), American conchologist
- James G. Oldroyd (1921–1982), British mathematician and rheologist
- Jean Oldroyd (born 1942), British former swimmer
- Liddy Oldroyd (1955–2002), English television director
- Mark Oldroyd (1843–1927), British woollen manufacturer and Liberal Party politician
- Rachel Oldroyd, the managing editor at the Bureau of Investigative Journalism

== See also ==
- George Oldroyd Borwick (1879–1964), Conservative Party politician in the United Kingdom
- Mick Rogers (musician) (born Michael Oldroyd; 1946), English musician
- Oldroyd Island, small island northwest of Magnetic Island in the east part of Prydz Bay
- Oldroyd-B model, constitutive model used to describe the flow of viscoelastic fluids
- Oldroydia
