= West Midlands =

West Midlands may refer to:

- West Midlands (region), a region of England
  - West Midlands (county), the metropolitan county in the West Midlands region
  - West Midlands conurbation, the large conurbation in the West Midlands region
- West Midlands (European Parliament constituency), former constituency

== Other uses ==
- BBC West Midlands, a local BBC region
