= Papenvoort =

Papenvoort may refer to:

- Papenvoort (Drenthe), Netherlands
- Papenvoort (North Brabant), Netherlands
