= Bromsberg =

Coordinates: 51°07′11″N 9°40′39″E

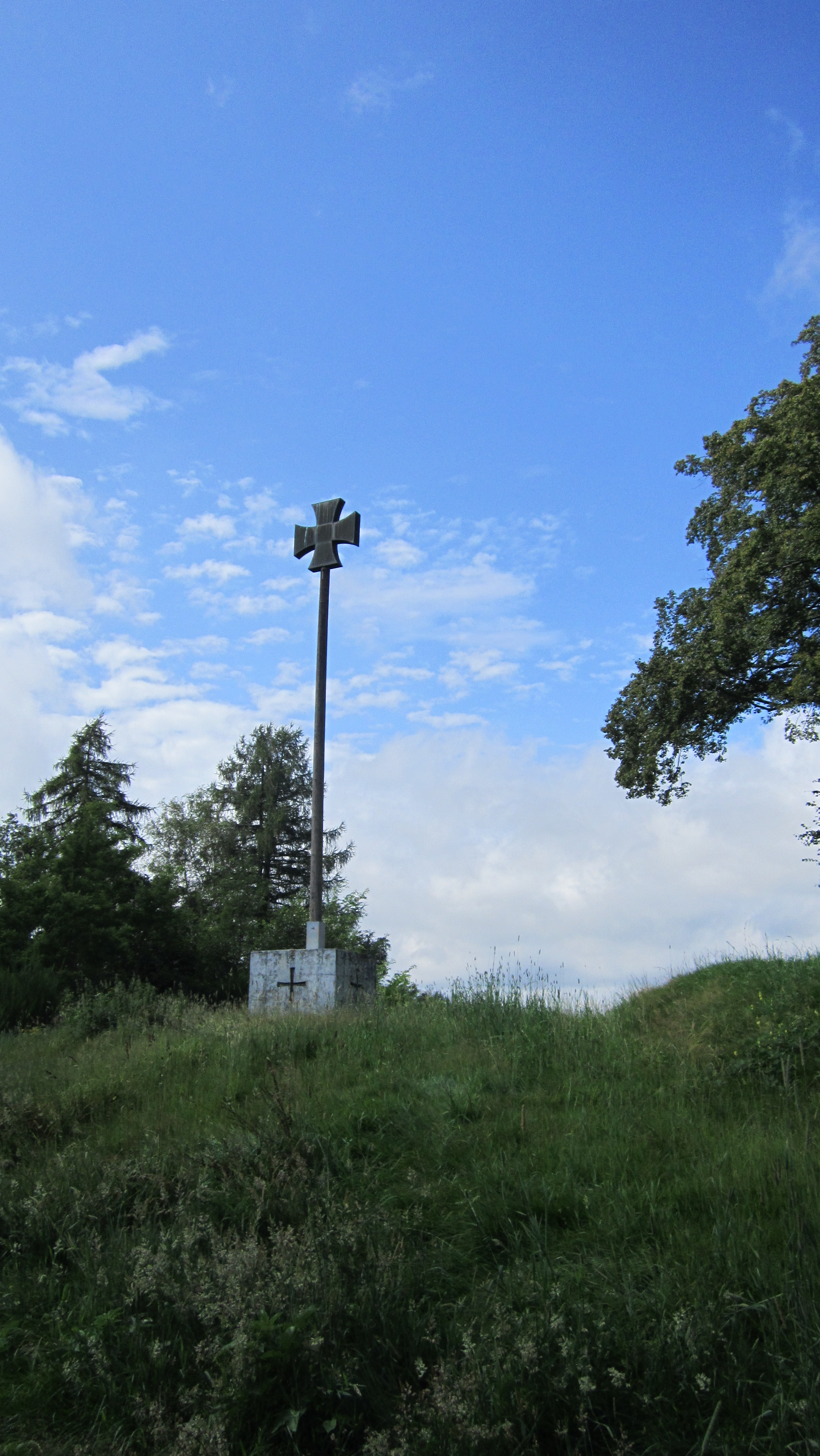
- Summit cross on Bromsberg

Highest point
- Elevation: 427.2 m (1,402 ft)

Geography
- Location: Schwalm-Eder-Kreis, Hesse, Germany

The Bromsberg is a hill in the county of Schwalm-Eder-Kreis, Hesse, Germany.
