= Frischebach =

River in Germany

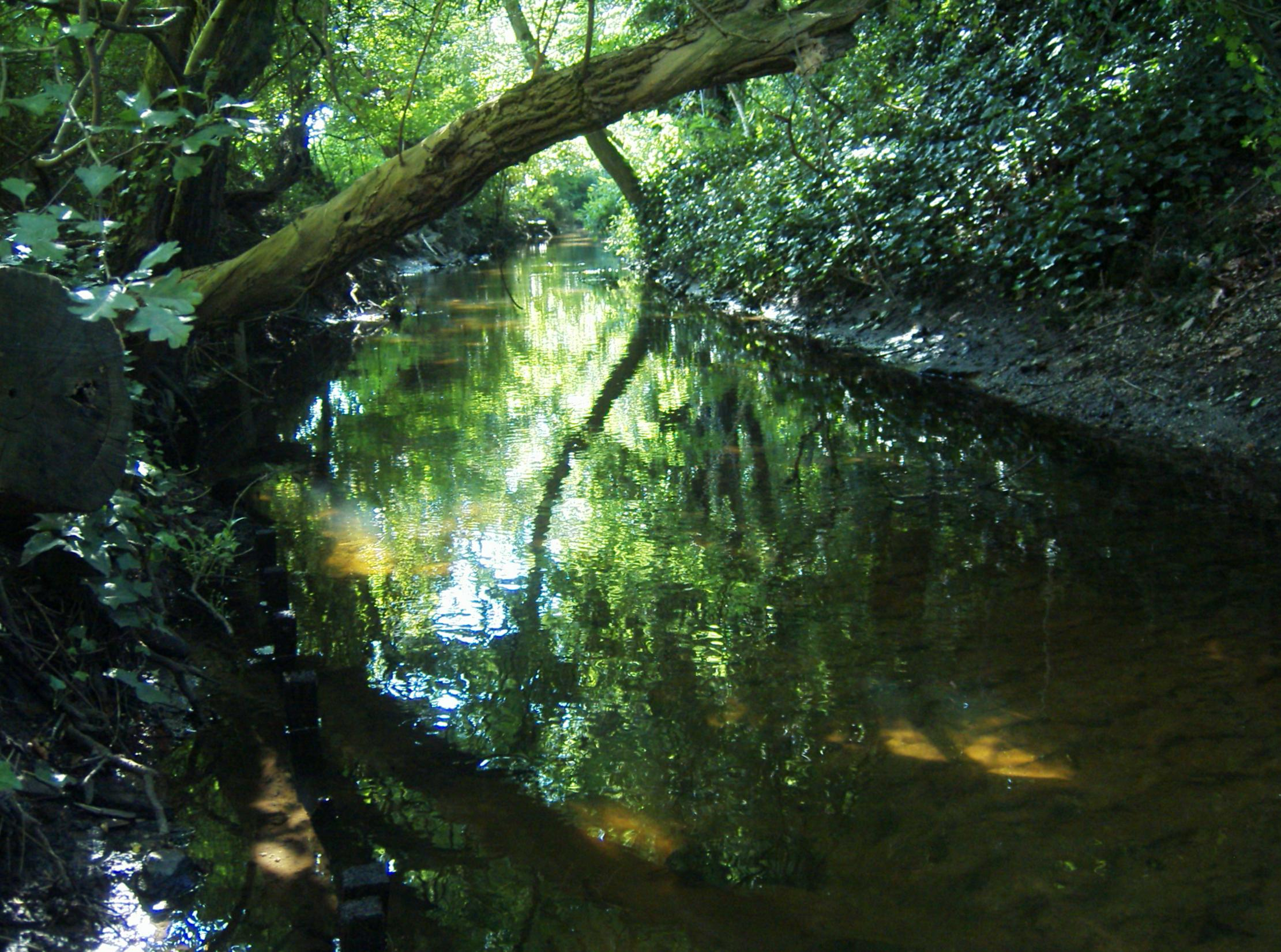

Location
- Country: Germany
- State: North Rhine-Westphalia

Physical characteristics
- Mouth
  - location: Ems
  - coordinates: 52°15′01″N 7°27′55″E

Basin features
- Progression: Ems→ North Sea

Frischebach (in its upper course: Wambach) is a river of North Rhine-Westphalia, Germany. It flows into the Ems near Rheine.

== See also ==
- List of rivers of North Rhine-Westphalia
