= Westerland =

Westerland may refer to:

- Westerland, Germany, a town on the island Sylt, Schleswig-Holstein, Germany
- Westerland, Netherlands, a village in North Holland, Netherlands
- "Westerland" (song), by Die Ärzte
