= Killingholme =

Killingholme may refer to:

- North Killingholme, village and civil parish in Lincolnshire, England
  - Historical references (pre 20th century), to "Killingholme" generally imply North Killingholme the larger of the two villages
  - North Killingholme Haven, a harbour in Lincolnshire
- South Killingholme, village and civil parish in Lincolnshire, England
- RNAS Killingholme, a First World War seaplane base
- RAF North Killingholme, an airfield, used extensively during the Second World War
- Killingholme railway station, Lincolnshire, England
- PS Killingholme, a paddle steamer
