= Hollom =

Hollom is a surname. Notable people with the surname include:

- Philip Hollom (1912–2014), British ornithologist
- Jasper Hollom (1917–2014), chief cashier of the Bank of England
