= Sint Philipsland =

Sint Philipsland may refer to:

- Sint Philipsland (island), a former island in the Dutch province of Zeeland
- Sint Philipsland (village), a village in the Dutch municipality of Tholen
