= Van Niekerk =

Van Niekerk is an Afrikaans surname. Notable people with the surname include:

- Barend van Niekerk (1939–1981), South African lawyer and academic
- Dane van Niekerk (born 1993), South African cricketer
- Dennis van Niekerk (born 1984), South African cyclist
- Dewald van Niekerk (born 1997), South African squash player
- Janro van Niekerk (born 1982), South African rugby union player
- Joe van Niekerk (born 1980), South African rugby union player
- Kraai van Niekerk (born 1938), South African politician
- Lara van Niekerk (born 2003), South African swimmer
- Marlene van Niekerk (born 1954), South African writer
- Martin van Niekerk (born 1989), Namibian cricketer
- Wayde van Niekerk (born 1992), South African sprinter
