= Aldekerk =

Town in western Germany

- Ortschaft of Kerken
- Interactive map of Aldekerk
- Location within Germany Location within North Rhine-Westphalia
- Coordinates: 51°26′20″N 6°24′55″E
- Country: Germany
- State: North Rhine-Westphalia
- Admin. region: Düsseldorf
- District: Kleve
- Municipality: Kerken
- Time zone: UTC+01:00 (CET)
  - Summer (DST): UTC+02:00 (CEST)

Aldekerk is a village and a part of the municipality of Kerken in Kleve (district), which is part of the Düsseldorf administrative region. in the state of North Rhine-Westphalia, Germany. It is located near the border with the Netherlands, approx. 15 km north-east of Venlo. It was an independent municipality until July 1969, when it was merged with Stenden, Eyll, Nieukerk and Vernum to form the new municipality Kerken.

== History ==
A notable resident was Herman op den Graeff, who was born there in 1585 and became a community leader of the Mennonites at Krefeld.

The Gothic church of Saints Peter and Paul was built in the early fifteenth century and modified in the late nineteenth century.

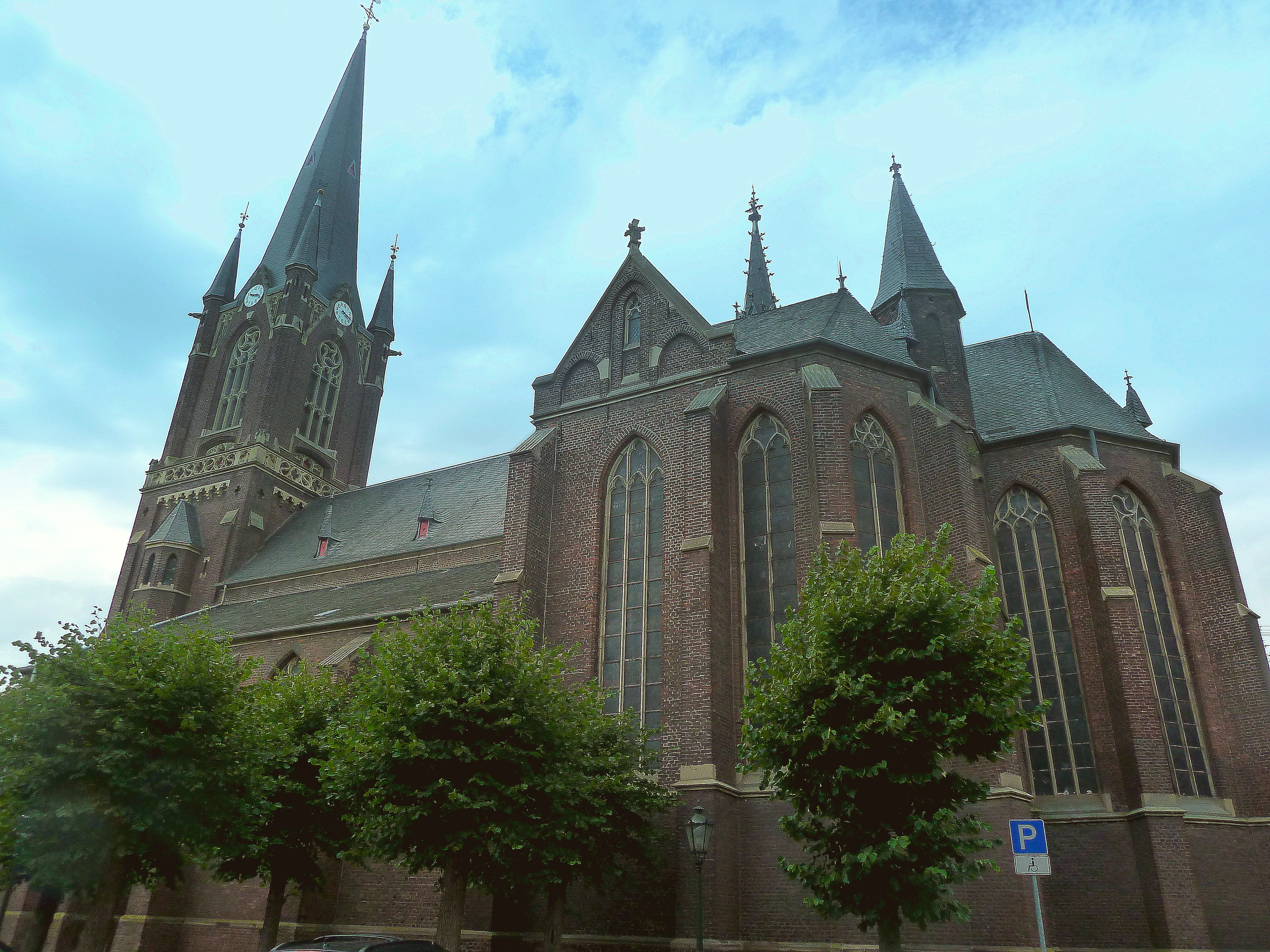

The town saw the final crash of German fighter ace Klaus Mietusch in September 1944 and was captured by the 8th Armored Division (United States) in March 1945.

== Transport ==
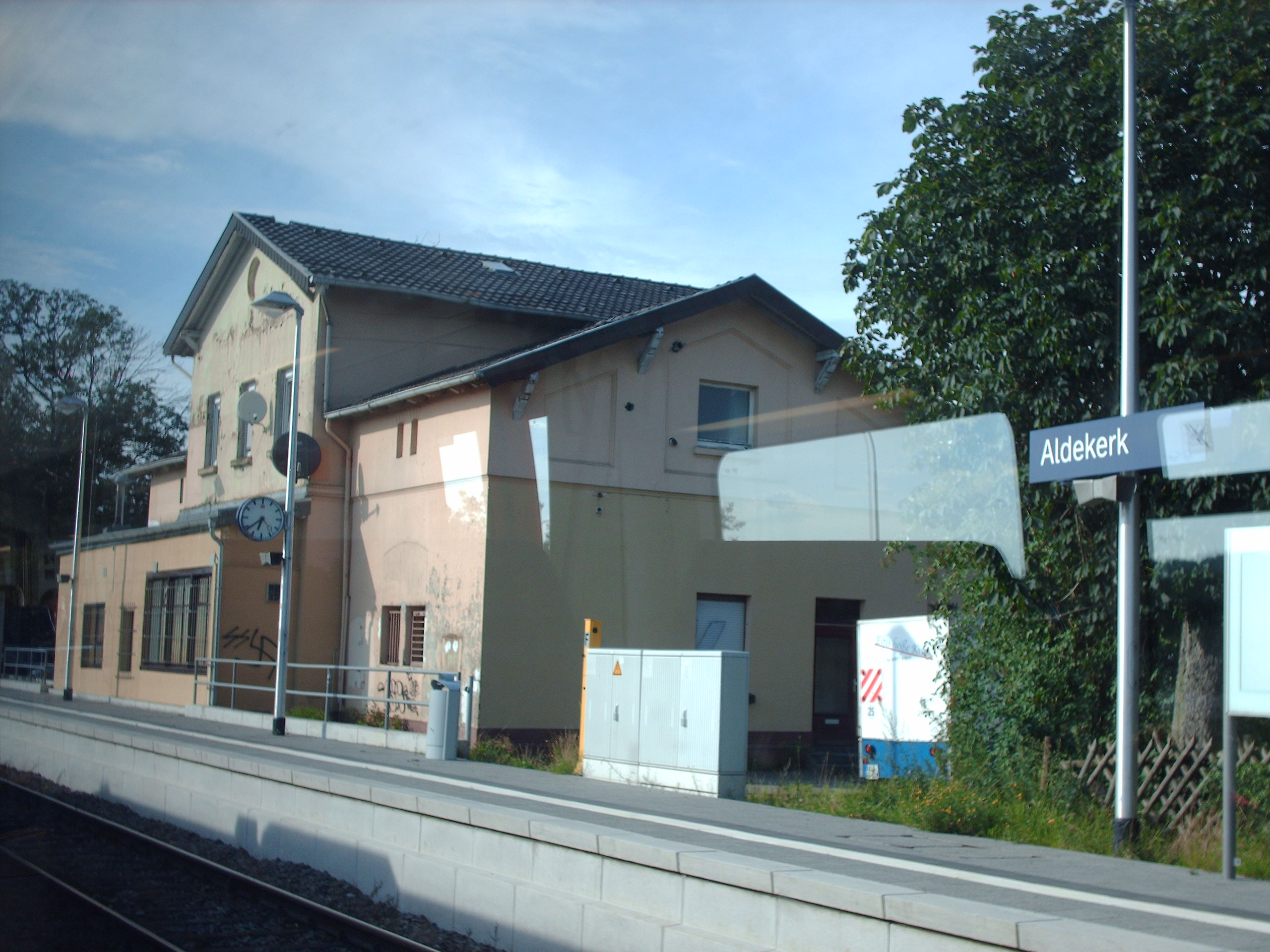
Aldekerk Railway Station

The railway station is 72.7 km from the Köln Hauptbahnhof (Cologne's central station) on the Lower Left Rhine Railway, which extends to Kleve (Cleves) and used to go on to Nijmegen. Passenger trains service it half-hourly on weekdays and hourly on weekends. The average speed on the single track is 66 km/h.

Since August 2024, there has been a direct bus service from Aldekerk to Venlo. The trip takes about 30 minutes.

== Sport ==
Handball coach and former player Henk Groener (born 1960 in the Netherlands) played for TV Aldekerk in 1990-1991.

Olympic medalist Julius Kühn (handballer) (born 1993) played for TV Aldekerk between 1999 and 2008

Alina Grijseels (born 1996) played for TV Aldekerk until 2015.

Luca Witzke (born 1999) played for TV Aldekerk from 2011 till 2014 and has been in the Germany men's national handball team.

The women's handball team TPSG Frisch Auf Göppingen received a transfer in the 2024-2025 season of Netherlander Mariel Stefanie Beugels (CB) from TV Aldekerk.
