= Waldhambach =

Waldhambach may refer to:

- Waldhambach, Bas-Rhin, France
- Waldhambach, Rhineland-Palatinate, Germany
