= Blankenham =

- Village
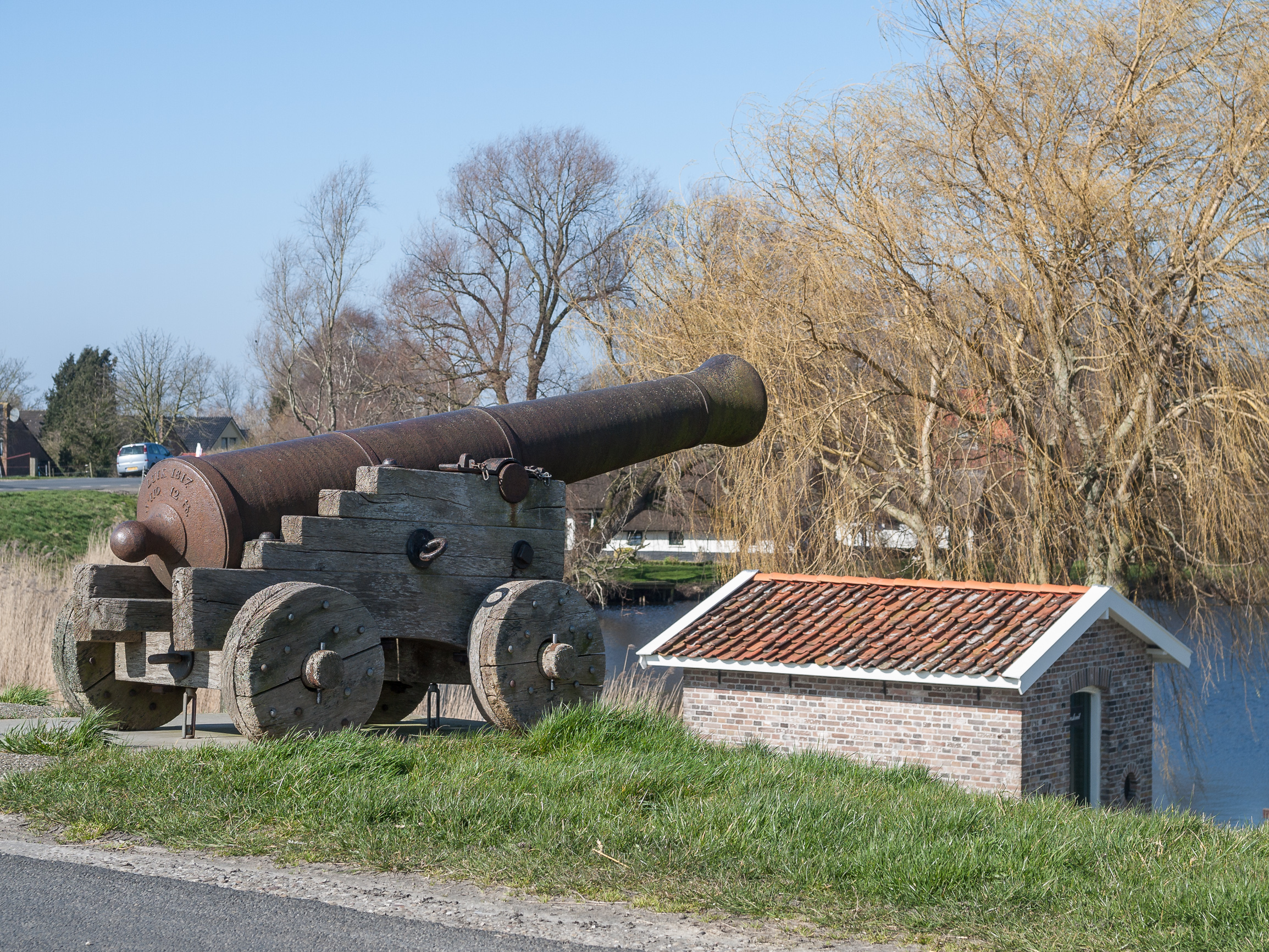
- Canon in Blankenham

- Location in the Netherlands Blankenham (Netherlands)
- Coordinates: 52.7623°N 5.8935°E
- Country: Netherlands
- Province: Overijssel
- Municipality: Steenwijkerland

Area
  - Total: 13.35 km^{2} (5.15 sq mi)
- Elevation: −0.4 m (−1.3 ft)

Population (2021)
  - Total: 220
  - Density: 16/km^{2} (43/sq mi)
- Time zone: UTC+1 (CET)
  - Summer (DST): UTC+2 (CEST)
- Postal code: 8373
- Dialing code: 0527

Blankenham is a village in the Netherlands, in the municipality of Steenwijkerland. Until 1973, it was a separate municipality.

== History ==
Blankenham is situated on the dike along the former Zuiderzee. It was named after Frederick of Blankenheim, the Prince-Bishop of Utrecht who gave the villagers permission to build a church and establish an independent parish. The village was severely effected by floods in 1776 and 1825. In 1840, it was home to 282 people.

The Dutch Reformed Church was finished in 1893, and is near a little pond which is a remnant of the 1825 flood. It replaced an 1816 church which was lost due to a lightning strike. The canon dates from 1817, and was last fired in 1964. There used to be two, but one was donated to the museum in Schokland. On 31 December 1963, the canon was stolen and moved to Luttelgeest. After 18 days, the canon was returned with a stone lion to guard it. The lion was stolen from Emmeloord.

== Gallery ==
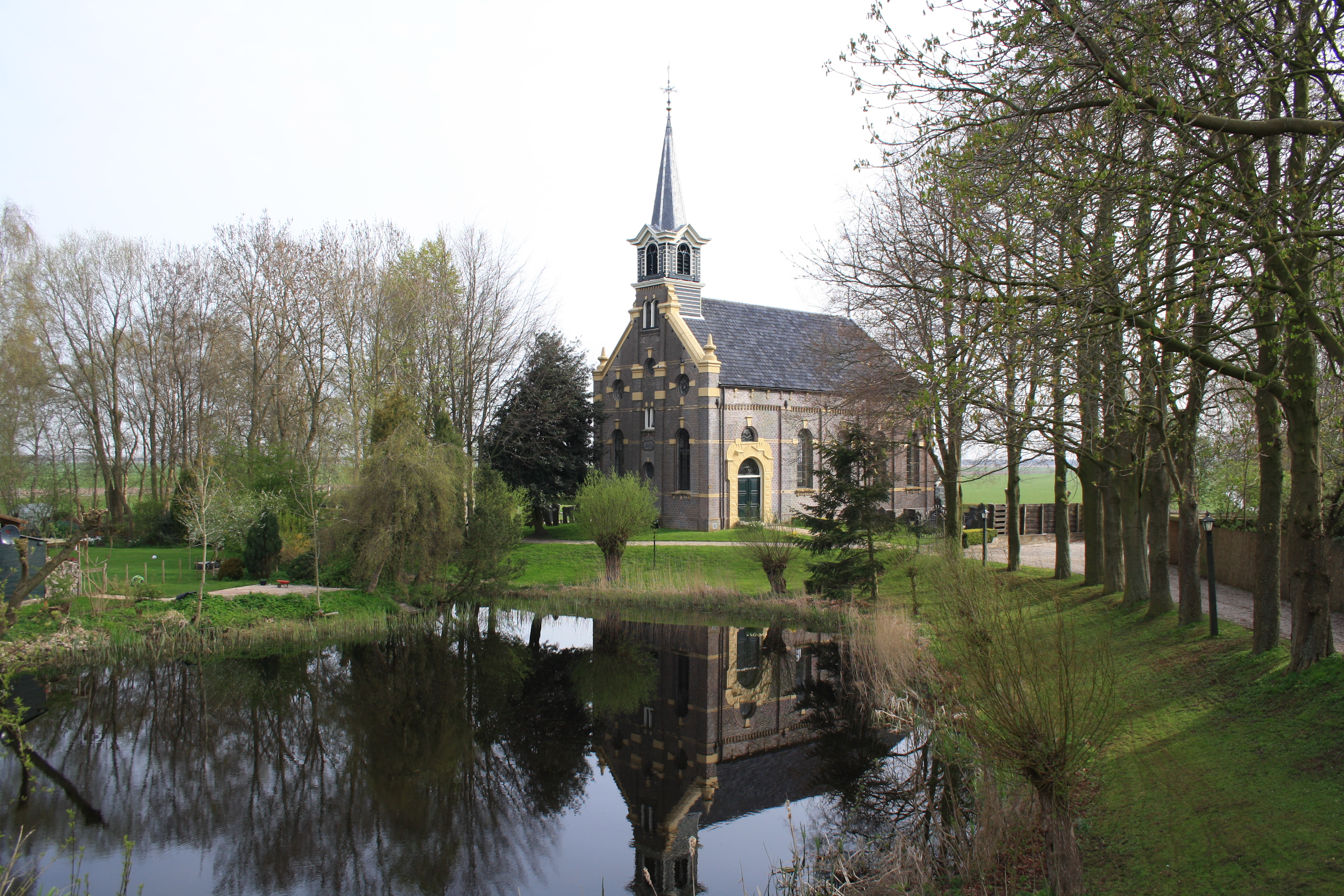
Church of Blankenham

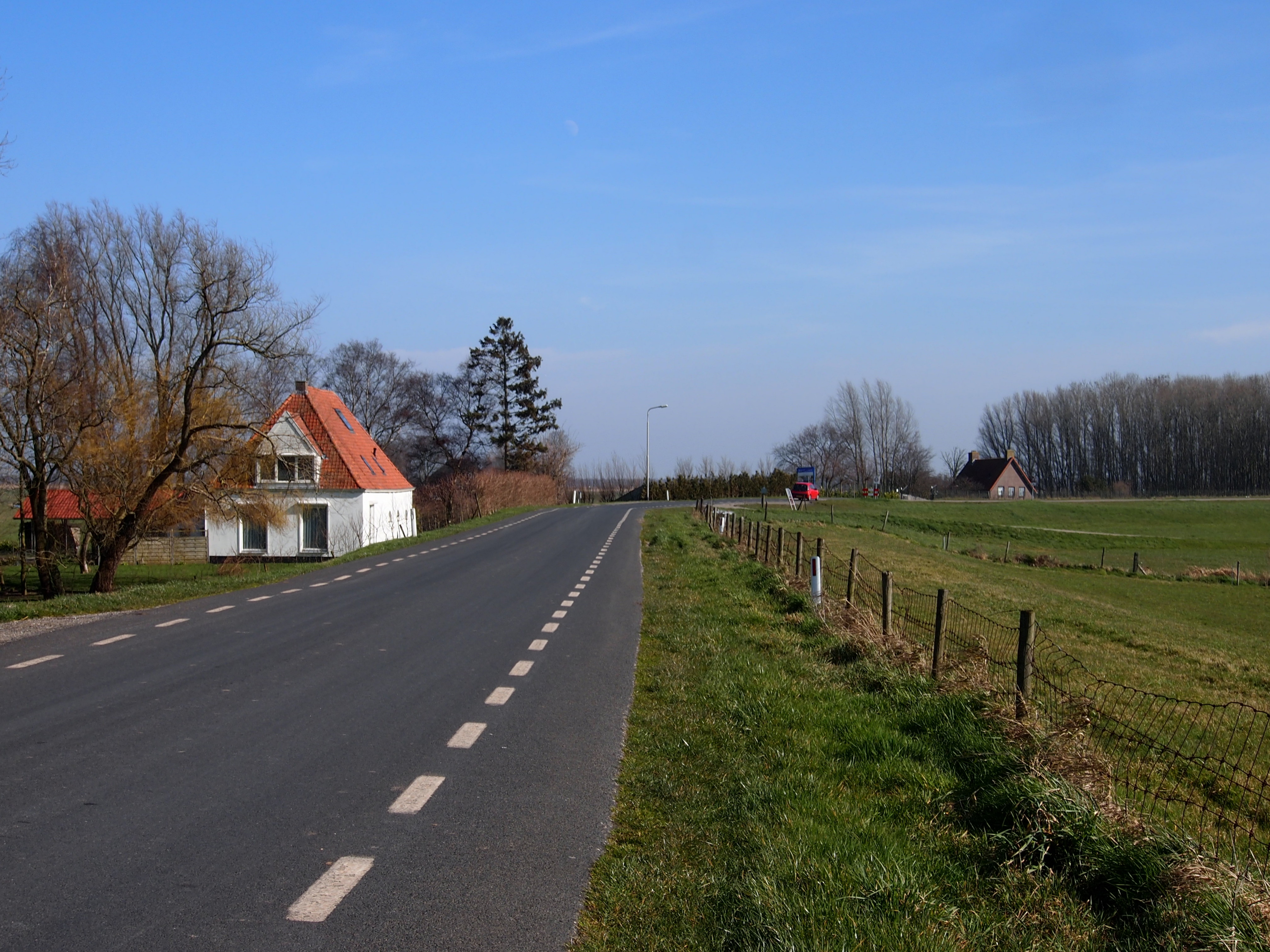
Blokzijler Dike

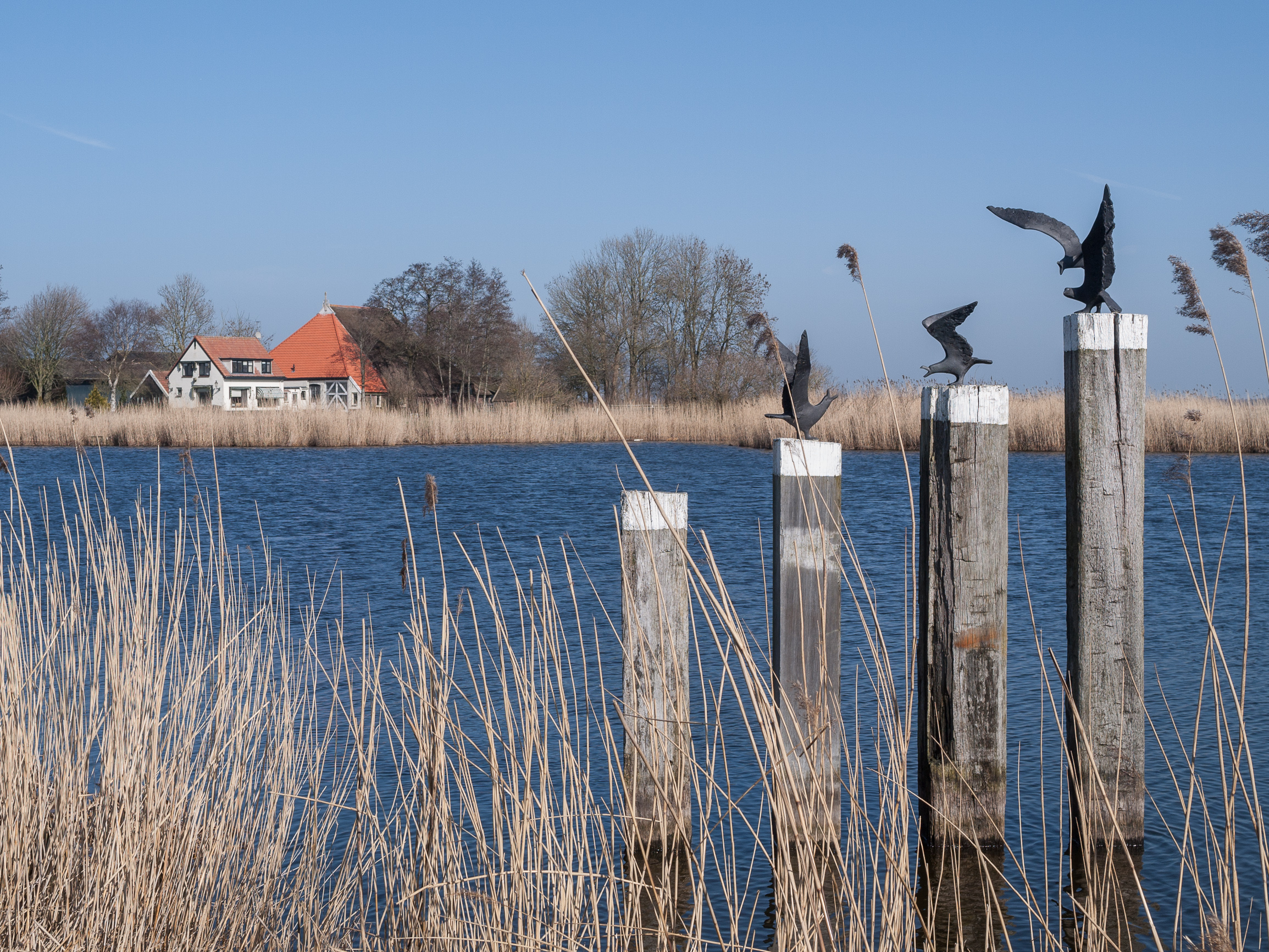
Art on poles

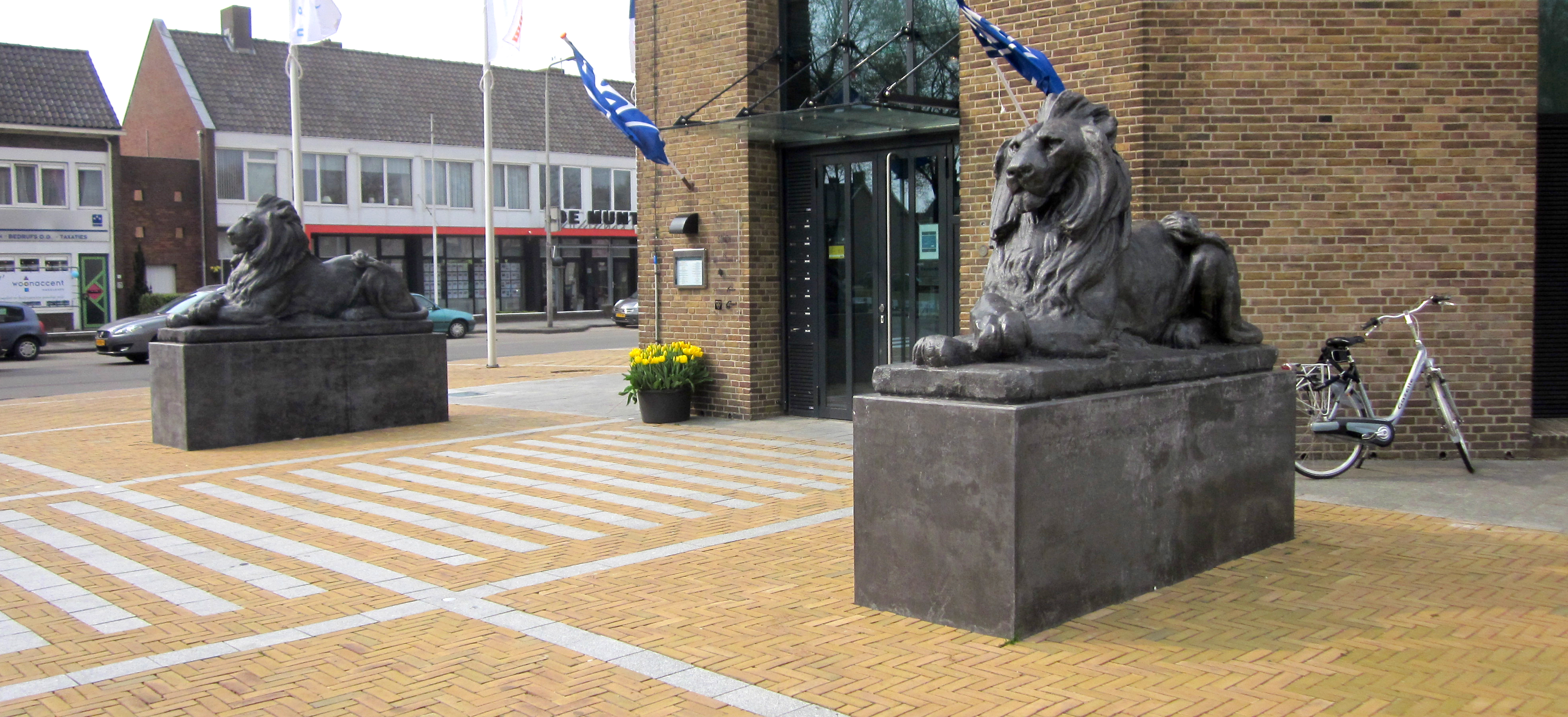
The lions in Emmeloord
