= Holm, Nordfriesland =

Holm
- Municipality
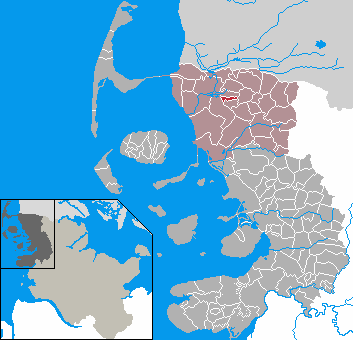
- Location of Holm within Nordfriesland district
- Interactive map of Holm
- Location within Germany Location within Schleswig-Holstein
- Coordinates: 54°49′N 8°52′E
- Country: Germany
- State: Schleswig-Holstein
- District: Nordfriesland
- Municipal assoc.: Südtondern

Government
  - Mayor: Günther Jürgensen

Area
  - Total: 4 km^{2} (1.5 sq mi)
- Elevation: 3 m (9.8 ft)

Population (2025-12-31)
  - Total: 93
  - Density: 23/km^{2} (60/sq mi)
- Time zone: UTC+01:00 (CET)
  - Summer (DST): UTC+02:00 (CEST)
- Postal codes: 25923
- Dialling codes: 04663
- Vehicle registration: NF
- Website: www.amt-suedtondern.de

Holm (German pronunciation: [hɔlm]) is a municipality in the district of Nordfriesland, in Schleswig-Holstein, Germany.
