= Clitourps =

- Commune
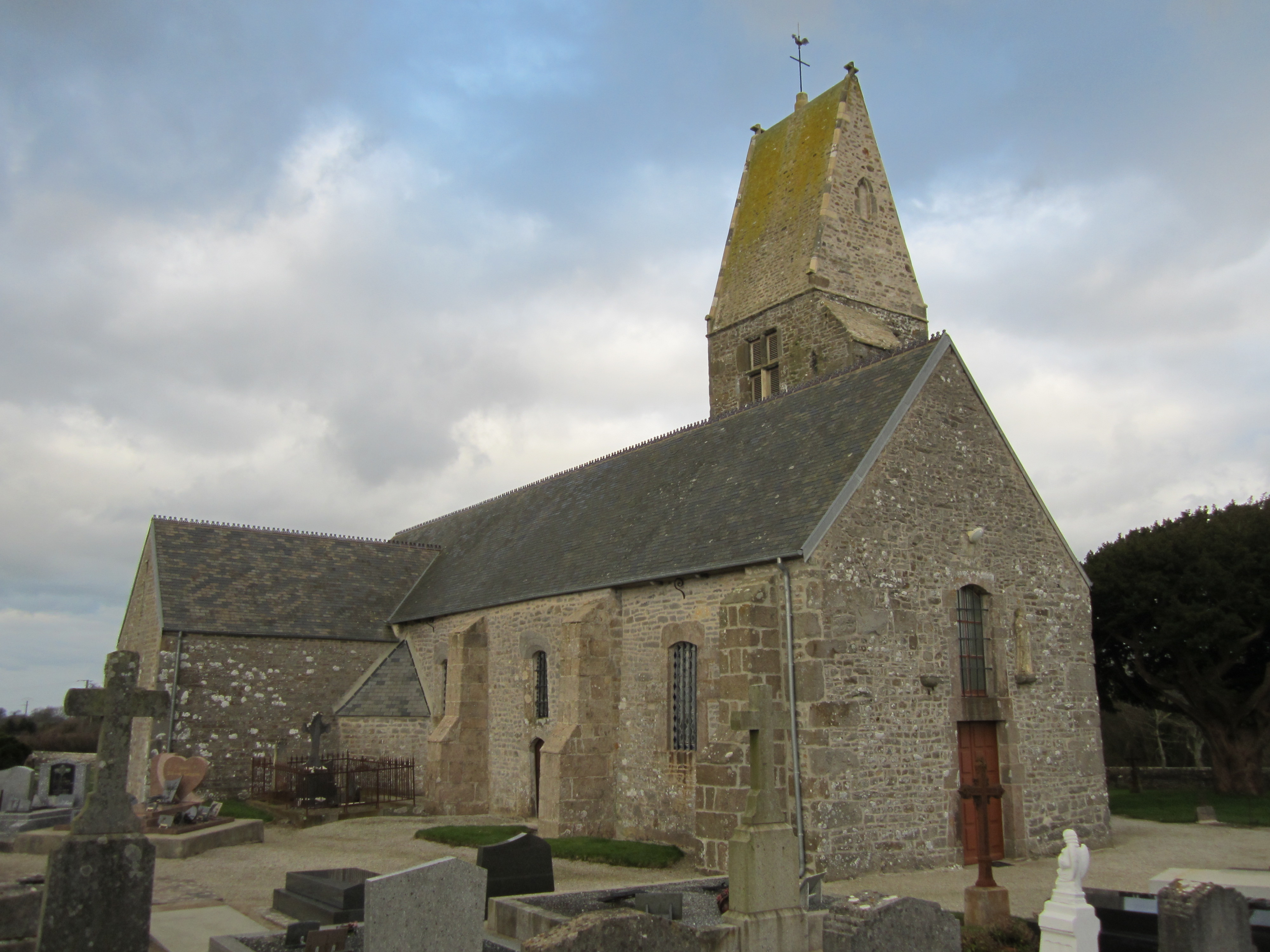
- The church of Notre-Dame
- Location of Clitourps
- Location within France Location within Normandy
- Coordinates: 49°39′24″N 1°22′12″W
- Country: France
- Region: Normandy
- Department: Manche
- Arrondissement: Cherbourg
- Canton: Val-de-Saire
- Intercommunality: CA Cotentin

Government
  - Mayor (2020–2026): Juliette Hurlot
- Area^{1}: 6.30 km^{2} (2.43 sq mi)
- Elevation: 95 m (312 ft)
- Highest elevation: 137 m (449 ft)
- Lowest elevation: 53 m (174 ft)
- Population (2023): 225
  - Density: 35.7/km^{2} (92.5/sq mi)
- Time zone: UTC+01:00 (CET)
  - Summer (DST): UTC+02:00 (CEST)
- INSEE/Postal code: 50135 /50330
- ^{1} French Land Register data, which excludes lakes, ponds, glaciers > 1 km^{2} (0.386 sq mi or 247 acres) and river estuaries.

Clitourps (French pronunciation: [klituʁ]) is a commune in the Manche department in Normandy in north-western France.

== See also ==
- Communes of the Manche department
