= Kruckenberg =

Kruckenberg is a German locational surname, which originally meant a person from the village of Kruckenberg, just east of Regensburg, Germany. Notable individuals with this surname include:

- Carl Kruckenberg (1881–1940), Swedish horse rider
- Franz Kruckenberg (1882–1965), German engineer

== See also ==
- Krukenberg
