= Criquetot =

Criquetot may refer to several communes in the Seine-Maritime department of France:

- Criquetot-l'Esneval
- Criquetot-le-Mauconduit
- Criquetot-sur-Longueville
- Criquetot-sur-Ouville
