= Foxham =

Foxham may refer to the following places:

- Foxham, Groningen, a town near Kolham, Netherlands
- Foxham, Wiltshire, England
