= Sunderland (disambiguation) =

Sunderland is a city in Tyne and Wear, England.

Sunderland may also refer to:

== Places ==
=== Canada ===
- Sunderland, Ontario

=== United Kingdom ===
- City of Sunderland, a metropolitan borough named after Sunderland, Tyne and Wear, comprising the city as well as neighbouring towns, Washington and Houghton-le-Spring
- Sunderland, Cumbria
- Sunderland, Lancashire, a village, also known as Sunderland Point

=== United States ===
- Sunderland, Maryland
- Sunderland, Massachusetts
- Sunderland, Portland, Oregon
- Sunderland, Vermont

== People ==
- Earl of Sunderland, peerage created several times
- Sunderland family of High Sunderland Hall, outside Halifax, West Yorkshire, England; early modern English gentry family
- Abby Sunderland (born 1993), American sailor
- Alan Sunderland (born 1953), former English football player
- Byron Sunderland (1819–1901), American Presbyterian minister
- Eliza Read Sunderland (1839–1910), American writer, educator, lecturer, women's rights advocate
- Eric Sunderland (1930–2010), British anthropologist and academic
- Harry Sunderland (1889–1964), Australian rugby league writer and administrator
- Heni Materoa Sunderland (1916–2008), Māori community leader in New Zealand
- Jabez T. Sunderland (1842-1936), American church minister and activist
- James Sunderland (Silent Hill), protagonist in the video game Silent Hill 2
- James Sunderland, American musician and member of pop duo Frenship
- James Sunderland (politician) (born 1970), English politician
- Kendra Sunderland (born 1995), a US pornography actress and webcam model
- Lawson Sunderland (born 2001), American professional soccer player
- Margot Sunderland, English psychologist and popular book author
- Paul Sunderland (born 1952), American sportscaster and member of the 1984 US Olympic gold medal volleyball team
- Sam Sunderland (born 1989), British professional motorcyclist
- Scott Sunderland (actor) (1883–1956), English actor
- Scott Sunderland (road cyclist) (born 1966), Australian former road racing cyclist and coach
- Scott Sunderland (track cyclist) (born 1988), Australian professional track cyclist
- Will Sunderland (born 1996), American professional football player
- Zac Sunderland (born 1991), American sailor

== Transportation ==
- HMS Sunderland, the name of three ships of the Royal Navy
- MV Sunderland, a coaster in service with Ross Line Ltd, 1958–68
- Short Sunderland, a Second World War flying boat made by Short Brothers

== Other ==
- Sunderland (UK Parliament constituency), from 1832 to 1950
- Sunderland A.F.C., a professional football team
- Sunderland A.F.C. Women, women's football team in the English city
- University of Sunderland, university in the English city
- Sunderland International Airshow, held in the English city
- Sunderland Lustreware ceramic originating from the English city
- ACG Sunderland School and College, a private school in Auckland, New Zealand
