= Walsum =

Walsum may refer to:

- Gerard van Walsum, mayor of Rotterdam
- Peter van Walsum, Dutch diplomat
- Walsum, Duisburg, a district of Duisburg, Germany
- Walsum power plant, in Duisburg, Germany
