= De Waal =

- Village
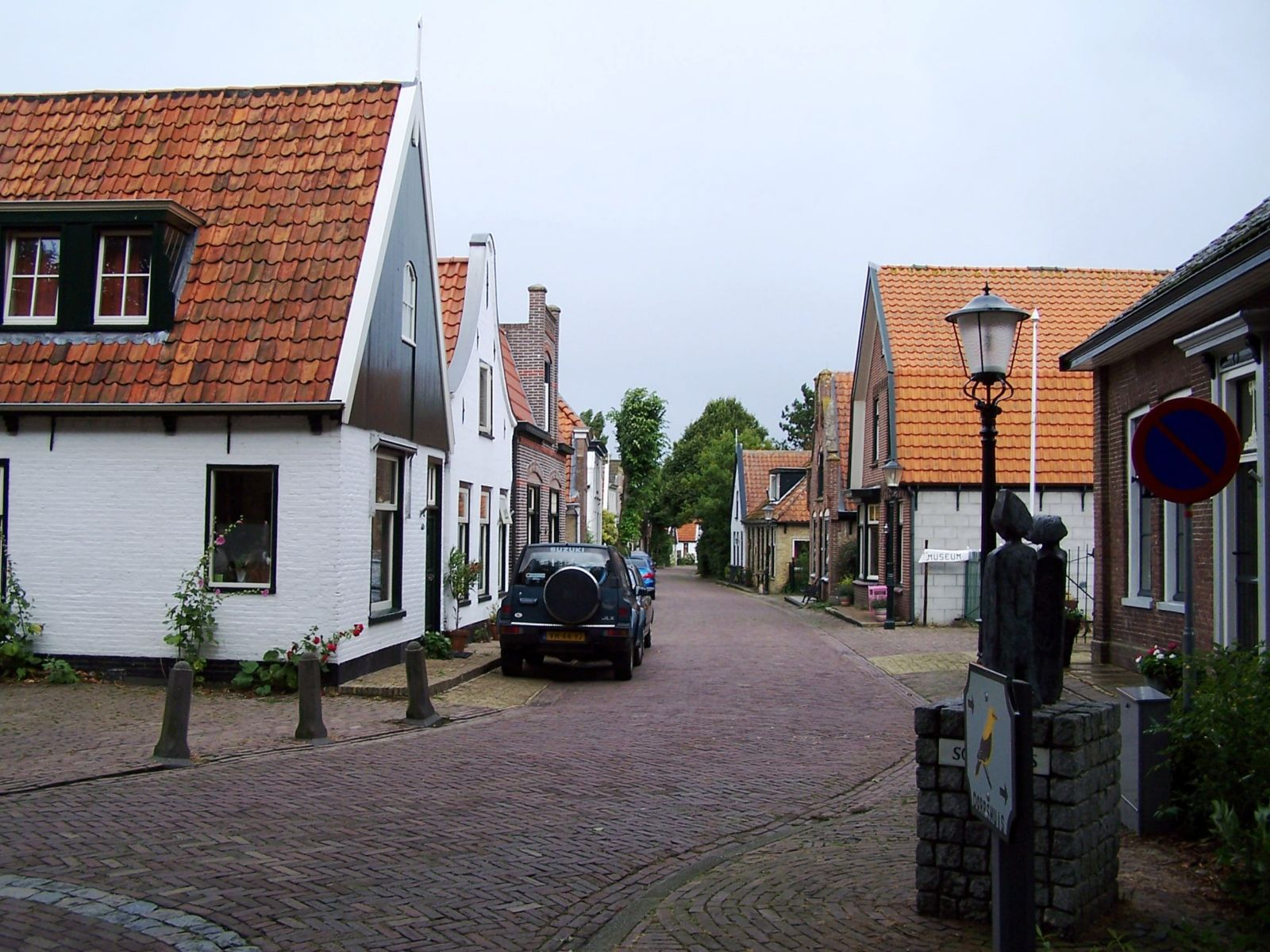
- Street view

- Location in the Netherlands Location in the province of North Holland in the Netherlands
- Coordinates: 53°4′N 4°49′E
- Country: Netherlands
- Province: North Holland
- Municipality: Texel

Area
  - Total: 0.35 km^{2} (0.14 sq mi)
- Elevation: 0.6 m (2.0 ft)

Population (2025)
  - Total: 205
  - Density: 590/km^{2} (1,500/sq mi)
- Time zone: UTC+1 (CET)
  - Summer (DST): UTC+2 (CEST)
- Postal code: 1793
- Dialing code: 0222

De Waal is a village in the Dutch province of North Holland. It is a part of the municipality of Texel, and lies about 15 km north of Den Helder.

The village was first mentioned in 1295 as "sancti Bonifacii in Waelkerken", and means "pond created after a dike breach". De Waal started to developed after the Waalenburg polder was created in 1436. The Dutch Reformed church is built on a terp (artificial hill). It was destroyed in 1945 during the Georgian uprising. A new church was built in 1952 and a tower was added in 1961.

== Gallery ==
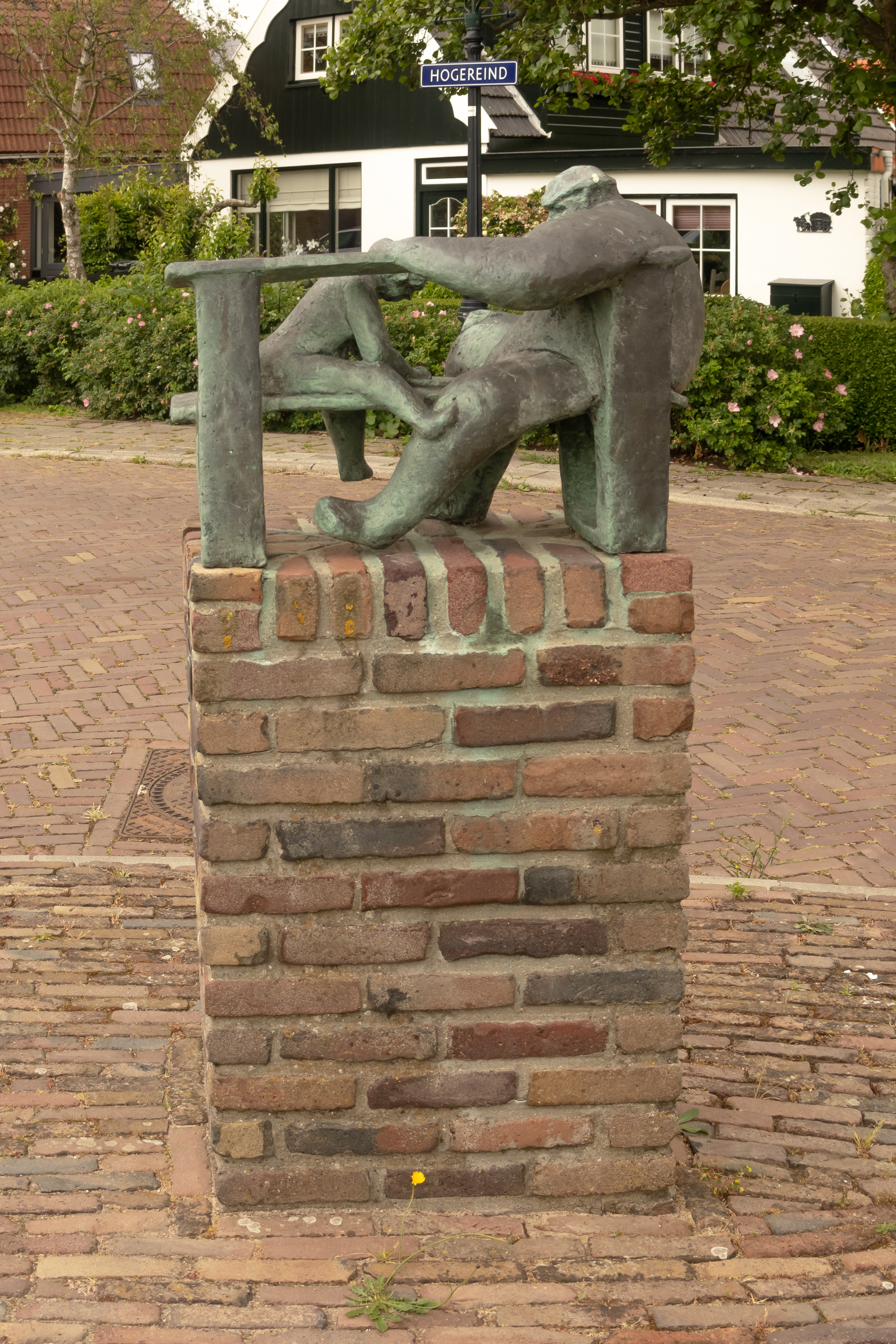
Sculpture 'the Game' designed by Marijn Koenen Gorter

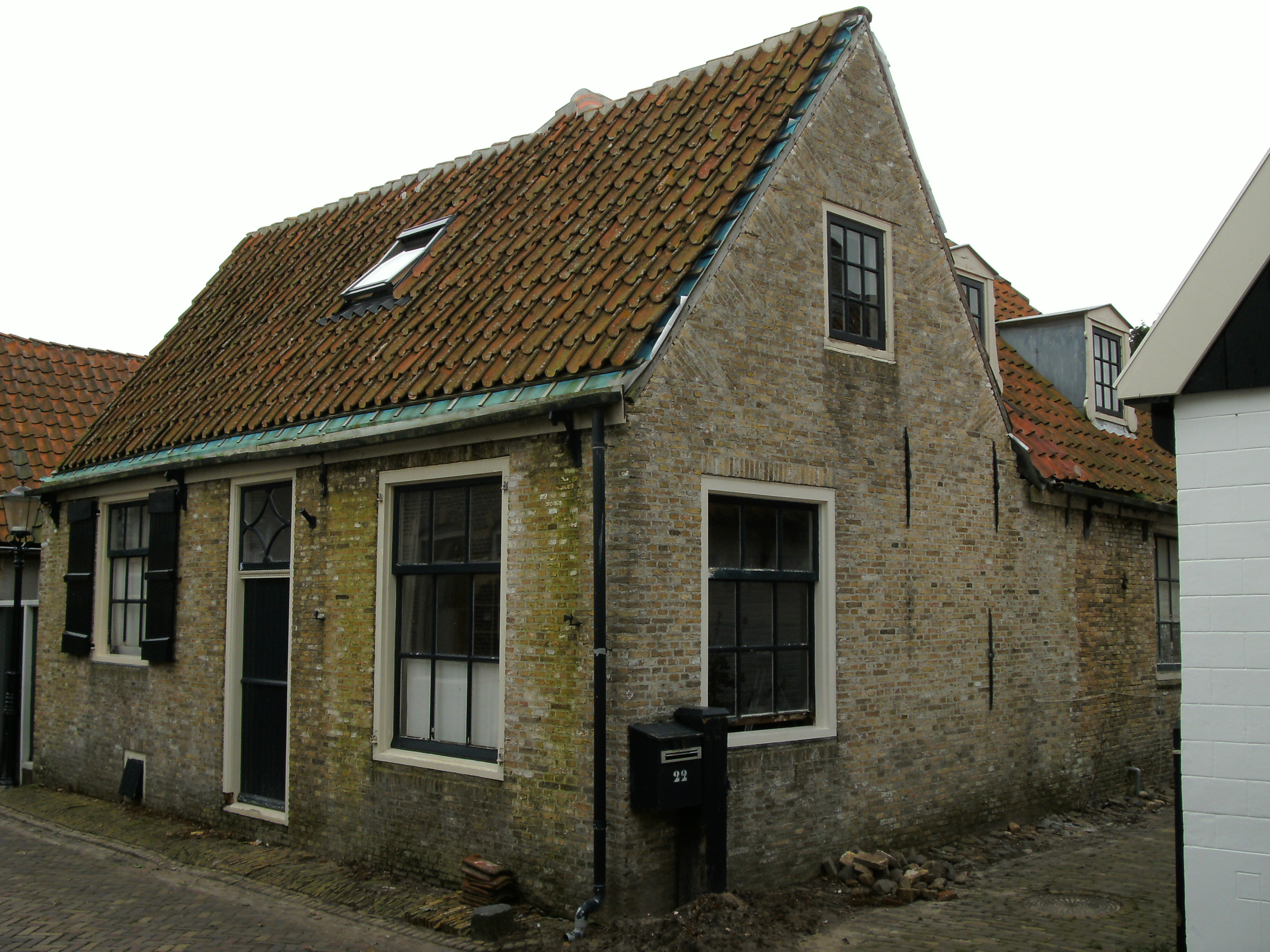
House in De Waal

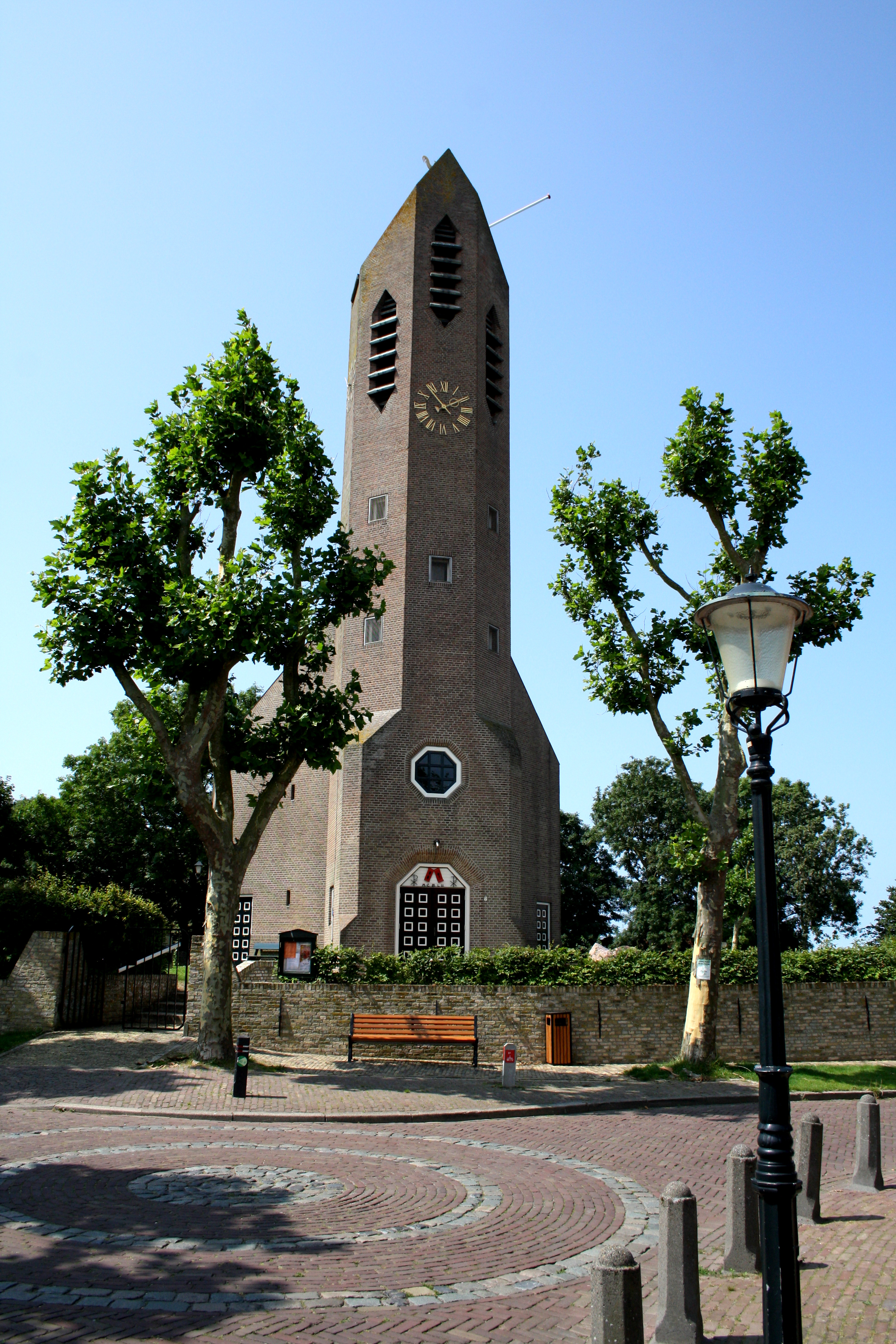
Dutch Reformed church

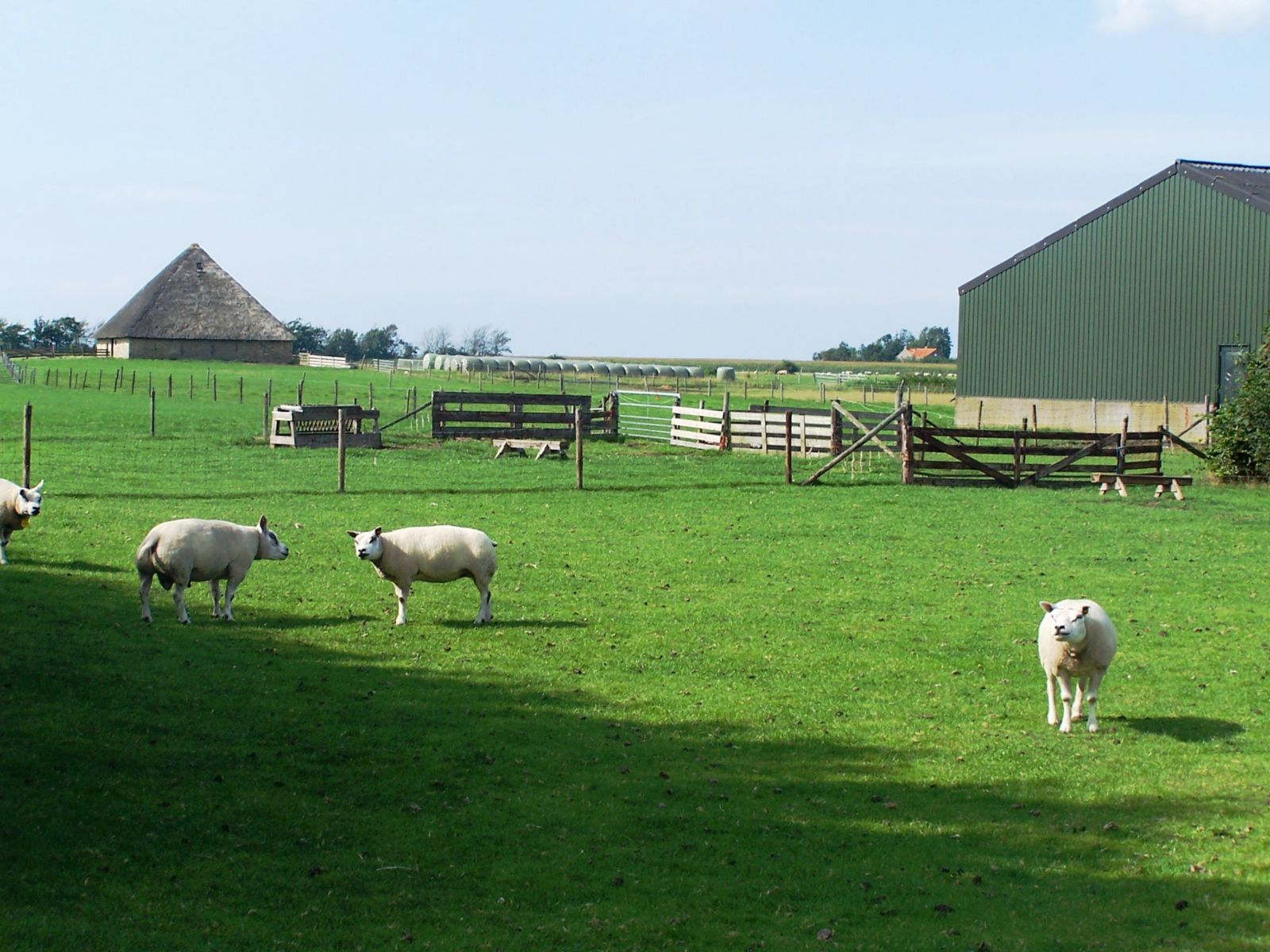
Farmland near De Waal
