= Volckerinckhove =

- Commune
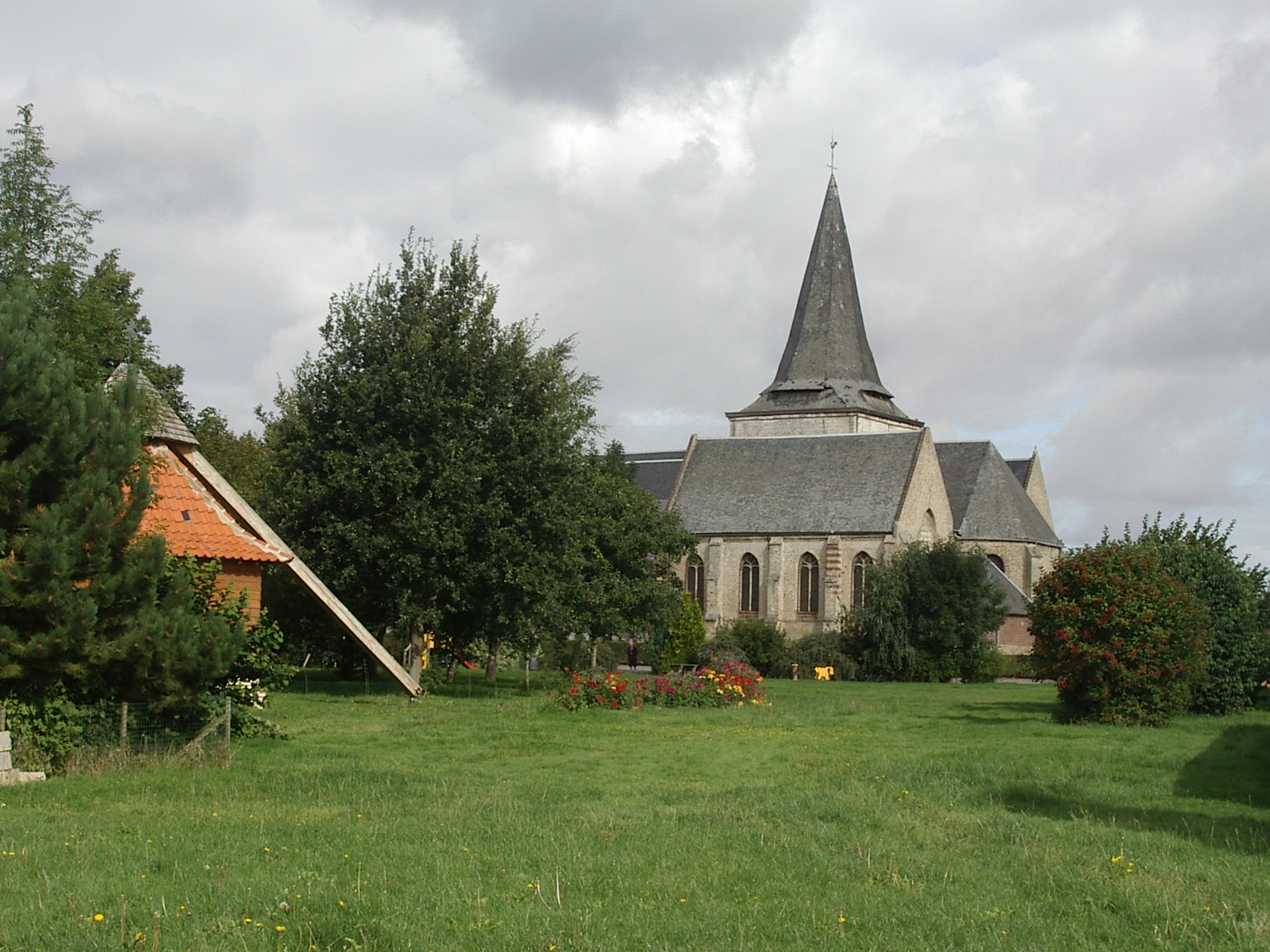
- The church in Volckerinckhove

- Coat of arms
- Location of Volckerinckhove
- Location within France Location within Hauts-de-France
- Coordinates: 50°50′22″N 2°18′23″E
- Country: France
- Region: Hauts-de-France
- Department: Nord
- Arrondissement: Dunkirk
- Canton: Wormhout
- Intercommunality: Hauts de Flandre

Government
  - Mayor (2022–2026): Nathalie Beun
- Area^{1}: 9.88 km^{2} (3.81 sq mi)
- Elevation: 30 m (98 ft)
- Highest elevation: 61 m (200 ft)
- Lowest elevation: 15 m (49 ft)
- Population (2023): 573
  - Density: 58.0/km^{2} (150/sq mi)
- Demonym: Volckerinckhovois
- Time zone: UTC+01:00 (CET)
  - Summer (DST): UTC+02:00 (CEST)
- INSEE/Postal code: 59628 /59470
- ^{1} French Land Register data, which excludes lakes, ponds, glaciers > 1 km^{2} (0.386 sq mi or 247 acres) and river estuaries.

Volckerinckhove (French pronunciation: [vɔlkəʁɛ̃kɔv]; Dutch: Volkerinkhove) is a commune in the Nord department in northern France. It is part of the arrondissement of Dunkirk and the canton of Wormhout.

== Heraldry ==
Arms of Volckerinckhove	The arms of Volckerinckhove are blazoned : Sable, on a chief argent, 2 mullets of 6 points pierced gules.

== See also ==
- Communes of the Nord department
