= Lowick =

Lowick may refer to:

- Lowick, Cumbria
- Lowick, Northamptonshire
- Lowick, Northumberland
- Lowick, Germany, part of Bocholt, Germany
