= Uentrop =

Uentrop may refer to:

- Uentrop (Lenne), a river of North Rhine-Westphalia, Germany, tributary of the Lenne
- Uentrop, a district of the town Hamm, North Rhine-Westphalia, Germany
- Uentrop, a district of the town Arnsberg, North Rhine-Westphalia, Germany
