= Asenray =

- Village
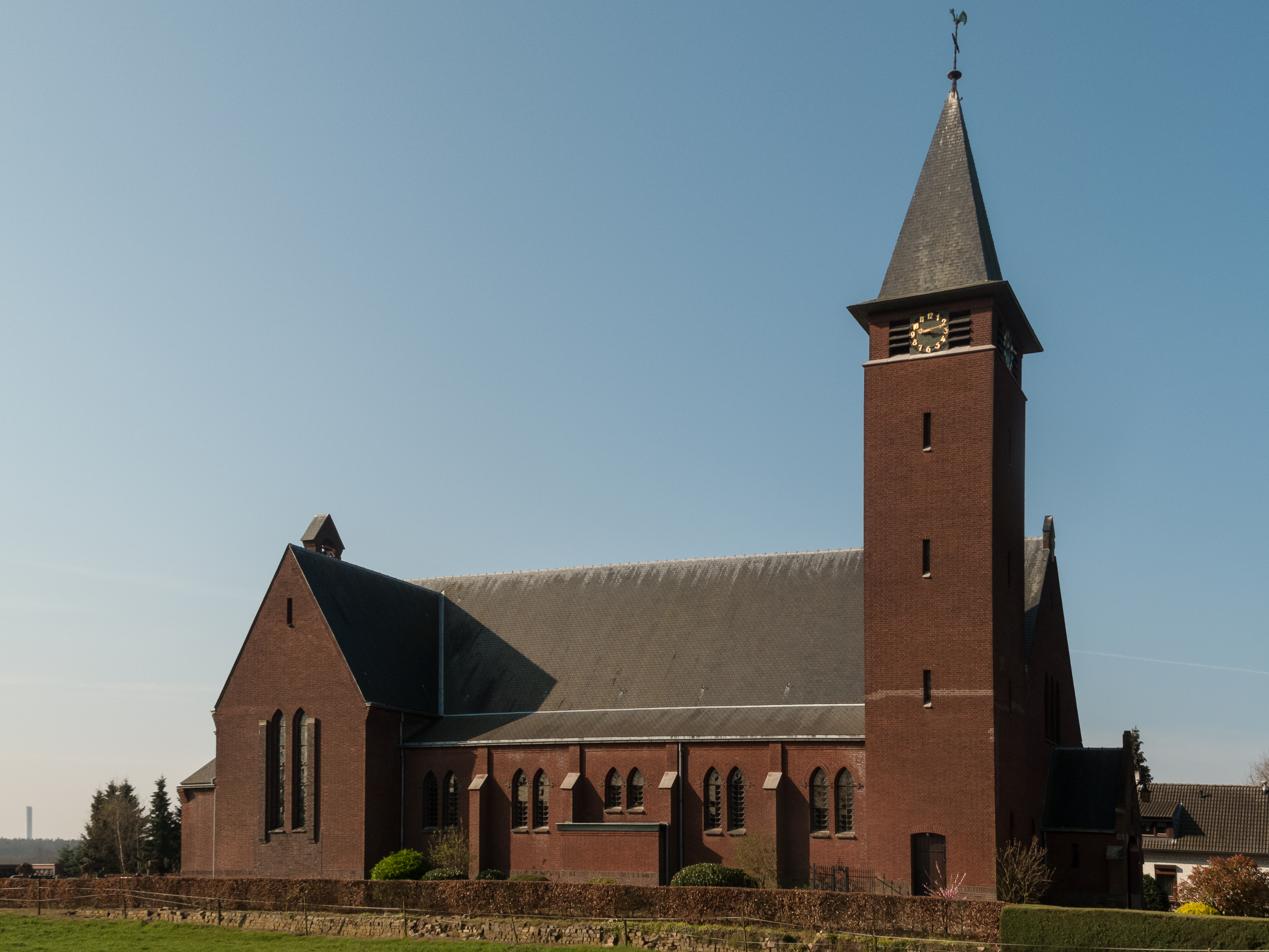
- Onze Lieve Vrouw van Goede Raad en Heilige Jozef

- Location in the Netherlands Location in the province of Limburg in the Netherlands
- Coordinates: 51°12′N 6°3′E
- Country: Netherlands
- Province: Limburg
- Municipality: Roermond

Area
  - Total: 8.59 km^{2} (3.32 sq mi)
- Elevation: 27 m (89 ft)

Population (2021)
  - Total: 1,015
  - Density: 118/km^{2} (306/sq mi)
- Time zone: UTC+1 (CET)
  - Summer (DST): UTC+2 (CEST)
- Postal code: 6042
- Dialing code: 0475

Asenray (Dutch pronunciation: [ˈaːsə(n)raːi]; Limburgish: Azeraoj [ˈaːzəʀɔːj]) is a village in the Dutch province of Limburg. It is a part of the municipality of Roermond, and lies about 3 km east of Roermond.

It was first mentioned in 1267 as "vicum qui dicitur Asenraede", and means "forest cultivation by Aso (person)". Asenray was home to 194 people in 1840. A church was built in 1932. In 1945, just before liberation, it was blown up by the Germans. In 1948, a new church was built.
