= Mickleburgh =

Mickleburgh is a surname. Notable people with the surname include:

- Jaik Mickleburgh (born 1990), English cricketer
- John Mickleburgh (c. 1692–1756), English chemist
