= Alice Baltzelle Addenbrooke =

American historian

- Born: Alice Merriam Baltzelle; October 10, 1881; Kentucky, U.S.
- Died: April 30, 1972 (aged 80); Seal Beach, California, U.S.
- Education: University of Nevada
- Occupations: Historian, writer, clubwoman, activist
- Spouse: Bernard Richard Addenbrooke
- Children: 3

Alice Merriam Baltzelle Addenbrooke (October 10, 1881 – April 30, 1972) was an American historian, clubwoman, and civic activist.

== Biography ==
Addenbrooke was born Alice Merriam Baltzelle on October 10, 1881, in Kentucky. She was a member of a prominent Kentucky family but spent most of her life in Reno, Nevada.

On December 30, 1902, she married Bernard Richard Addenbrooke. She and her husband operated a grocerty store in Reno but later sold it. She had three daughters.

She was a charter member of the Nevada Sagebrush Chapter of the Daughters of the American Revolution. Through her work with the DAR, she began researching the history of Fort Churchill and became an advocate for restoration of the fort. She authored a book on Fort Churchill titled The Enchanted Fort. She served as Honorary State Regent of the Nevada DAR.

She served as president of the Reno Women's Civic Club, as president of the local Parent-Teacher Association, and was a member of the Federated Church. In 1939, she was awarded an honorary life membership into the Oregon Trail Association. In the 1940s, she was appointed as the Washoe County Commission's historian.

Following the death of her husband, she graduated with honors from the University of Nevada.

In 1953, she joined Republican Senator George W. Malone's staff in Washington, D.C. as Head of Research.

She died on April 30, 1972, in Seal Beach, California.
