= Belle-et-Houllefort =

Belle-et-Houllefort Belle-Hollevoorde
- Commune
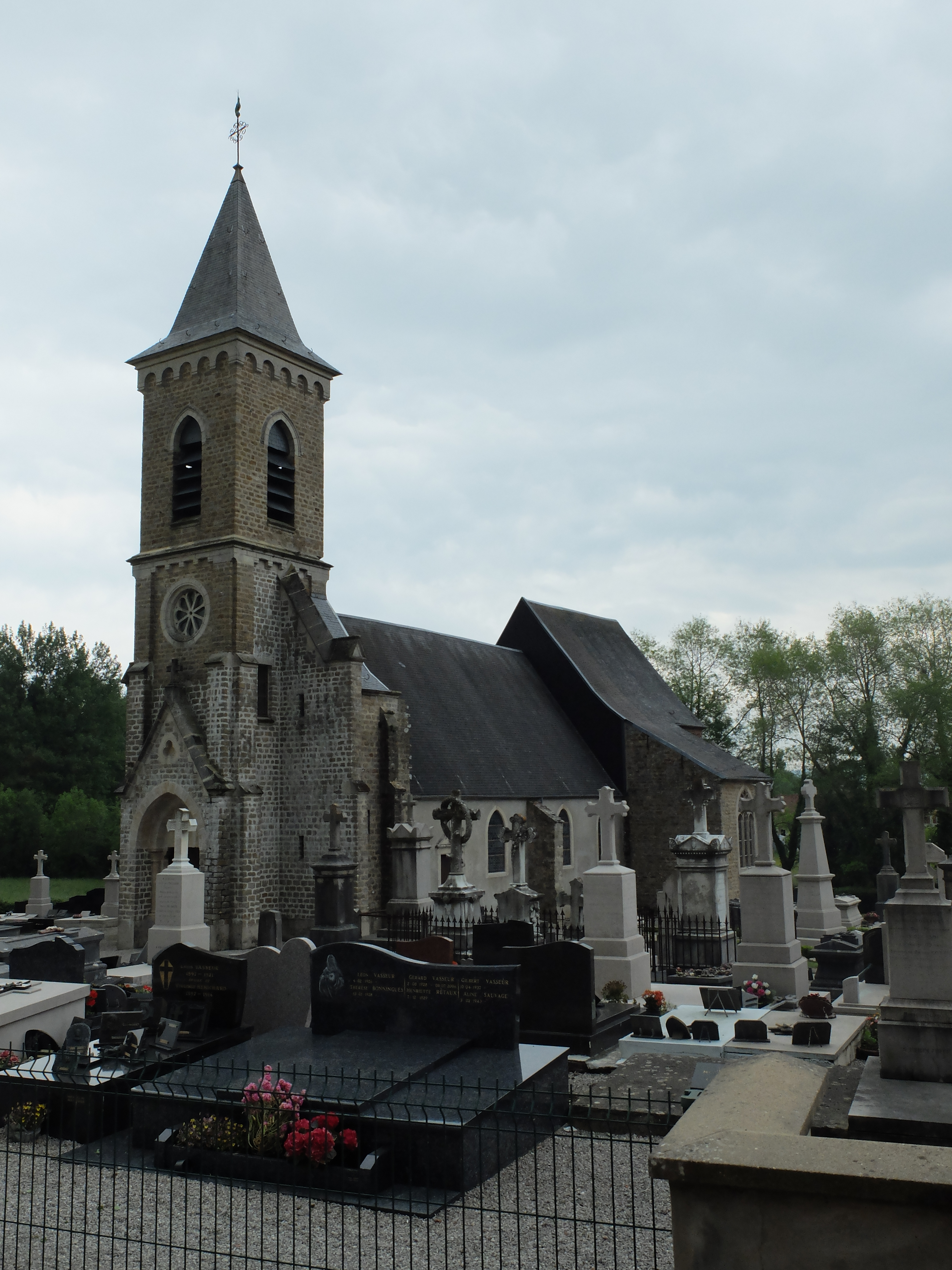
- The church of Belle-et-Houllefort

- Coat of arms
- Location of Belle-et-Houllefort
- Location within France Location within Hauts-de-France
- Coordinates: 50°44′39″N 1°45′34″E
- Country: France
- Region: Hauts-de-France
- Department: Pas-de-Calais
- Arrondissement: Boulogne-sur-Mer
- Canton: Desvres
- Intercommunality: CC Desvres-Samer

Government
  - Mayor (2020–2026): Michel Dufay
- Area^{1}: 9.14 km^{2} (3.53 sq mi)
- Elevation: 40 m (130 ft)
- Highest elevation: 84 m (276 ft)
- Lowest elevation: 26 m (85 ft)
- Population (2023): 503
  - Density: 55.0/km^{2} (143/sq mi)
- Time zone: UTC+01:00 (CET)
  - Summer (DST): UTC+02:00 (CEST)
- INSEE/Postal code: 62105 /62142
- ^{1} French Land Register data, which excludes lakes, ponds, glaciers > 1 km^{2} (0.386 sq mi or 247 acres) and river estuaries.

Belle-et-Houllefort (French pronunciation: [bɛl e ulfɔʁ]; West Flemish: Belle-Hollevoorde) is a commune in the Pas-de-Calais department in the Hauts-de-France region in northern France.

== Geography ==
A farming and quarrying commune, some 8 miles (13 km) northeast of Boulogne, at the junction of the N42, D233 and the D238 roads and by the banks of the river Wimereux.

== Population ==
Historical population
Year	Pop.	±% p.a.
1968	267	—
1975	278	+0.58%
1982	340	+2.92%
1990	405	+2.21%
1999	533	+3.10%
2007	525	−0.19%
2012	543	+0.68%
2017	560	+0.62%
2023	503	−1.77%
Source: INSEE

== Transport ==
The Chemin de fer de Boulogne à Bonningues (CF de BB) opened a station at Belle-et-Houllefort on 22 April 1900. Passenger services were withdrawn on 31 December 1935. They were reinstated in November 1942. The CF de BB closed in 1948.

== Sights ==
- The ruins of a fortified house.
- The church at Belle, dating from the twelfth century.
- The church at Houllefort, dating from the seventeenth century.
- The sixteenth century manorhouse du Major.
- The Hôtel-de-ville, built in 1862.

== See also ==
- Communes of the Pas-de-Calais department
