= Le Torpt =

- Commune
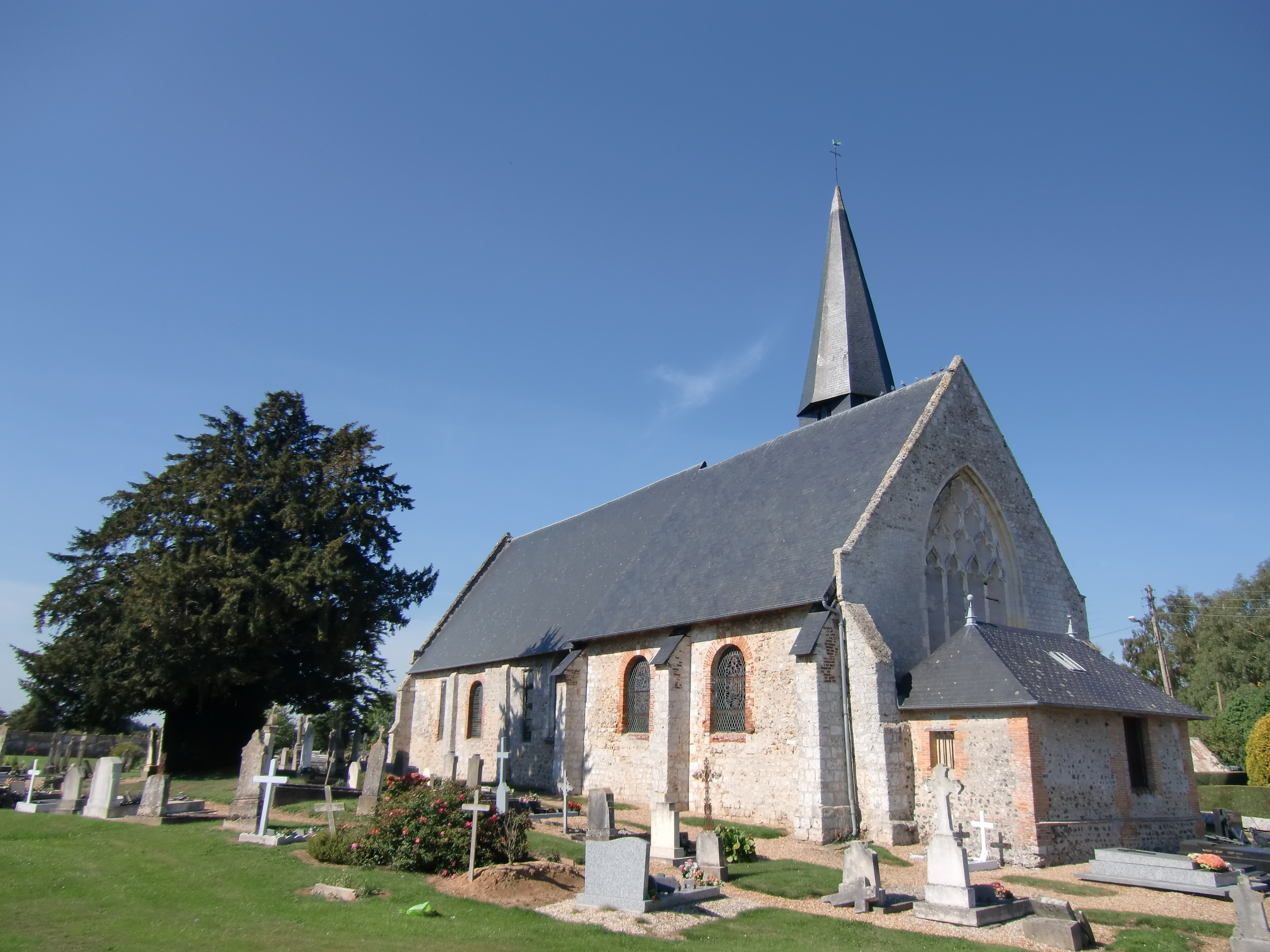
- The church in Le Torpt
- Location of Le Torpt
- Location within France Location within Normandy
- Coordinates: 49°20′01″N 0°22′29″E
- Country: France
- Region: Normandy
- Department: Eure
- Arrondissement: Bernay
- Canton: Beuzeville

Government
  - Mayor (2020–2026): Francis Delabrière
- Area^{1}: 6.59 km^{2} (2.54 sq mi)
- Elevation: 131 m (430 ft)
- Highest elevation: 143 m (469 ft)
- Lowest elevation: 45 m (148 ft)
- Population (2023): 469
  - Density: 71.2/km^{2} (184/sq mi)
- Time zone: UTC+01:00 (CET)
  - Summer (DST): UTC+02:00 (CEST)
- INSEE/Postal code: 27646 /27210
- ^{1} French Land Register data, which excludes lakes, ponds, glaciers > 1 km^{2} (0.386 sq mi or 247 acres) and river estuaries.

Le Torpt is a commune in the Eure department in Normandy in northern France.

== Population ==
Historical population
Year	Pop.	±% p.a.
1968	201	—
1975	194	−0.51%
1982	206	+0.86%
1990	213	+0.42%
1999	267	+2.54%
2007	291	+1.08%
2012	379	+5.43%
2017	443	+3.17%
2023	469	+0.96%
Source: INSEE

== See also ==
- Communes of the Eure department
