= Greenhaven, Georgia =

Proposed city in Georgia, United States

Greenhaven
- Proposed City
- Proposed location of Greenhaven in Metro Atlanta
- Coordinates: 33°44′14″N 84°13′51″W
- Country: United States
- State: Georgia
- County: DeKalb
- Time zone: UTC−5 (Eastern (EST))
  - Summer (DST): UTC−4 (EDT)

Greenhaven is a proposed city in southern DeKalb County, Georgia, outside Atlanta. It would consolidate several areas of DeKalb County south of U.S. Route 78, excluding the city of Stonecrest. Greenhaven would be the second largest city in the state after Atlanta, with a population of 300,000—of which 87 percent are African-American. The proposed city was announced by a city group in 2015 and unsuccessfully brought to the state legislature for approval three times, most recently in 2018.

== History ==
The group Concerned Citizens for Cityhood of South DeKalb was formed in 2014 to explore cityhood for southern DeKalb County. Unincorporated suburban areas of Metro Atlanta region, including northern DeKalb County, had formed new cities in the late 2000s, spurred by the success of Sandy Springs. While the group considered annexing into nearby cities, including Atlanta, it chose to pursue a new city to spur economic development and protest the region's lone participation county's pension plan. The name "Greenhaven" was announced in January 2015, representing sustainability; under the plan, the city would have a population of 295,000 residents and include most of DeKalb County south of U.S. Route 78, excluding the proposed city of Stonecrest.

Two groups, Citizens Against Cityhood in Dekalb and Neighbors Against Greenhaven, were formed to oppose the Greenhaven proposal, citing a potential decrease in property values. Other residents voiced their opposition on the proposed taxes to fund the new city, including those paying for the salaries of city officials.

A bill to grant cityhood to Greenhaven, pending a public referendum, was introduced in the Georgia House of Representatives during the 2015 legislative session, alongside a similar bill for Stonecrest. Both proposals failed to advance past committee consideration and never made it to the House floor. A similar version of the bill was approved by the Georgia State Senate, but failed to reach the House floor after being rejected by the House Governmental Affairs Committee, over public opposition to the cityhood measure. A third attempt was started in 2017 under the Senate's revised two-year process for new cities, which delayed legislative action until 2018. The bill passed the House Governmental Affairs Committee, but failed to receive a House floor vote.

The cityhood proposal was revived in late 2021 as the City of DeKalb, which would cover the same region of the county.

== Description ==
Greenhaven would be located in the southwest corner of DeKalb County, bordered by Atlanta to the west and Stonecrest to the east. The proposed city would have a population of approximately 300,000 people, making it the second largest city in the state, after Atlanta, and 87 percent of its residents would be African-American, a higher percentage than Atlanta's 53 percent. The median income of the area's residents is approximately $41,418, slightly above the rest of the unincorporated county.
