= Kingsland (Chimney Corner, Virginia) =

Historic house in Virginia, United States

- U.S. National Register of Historic Places
- Virginia Landmarks Register
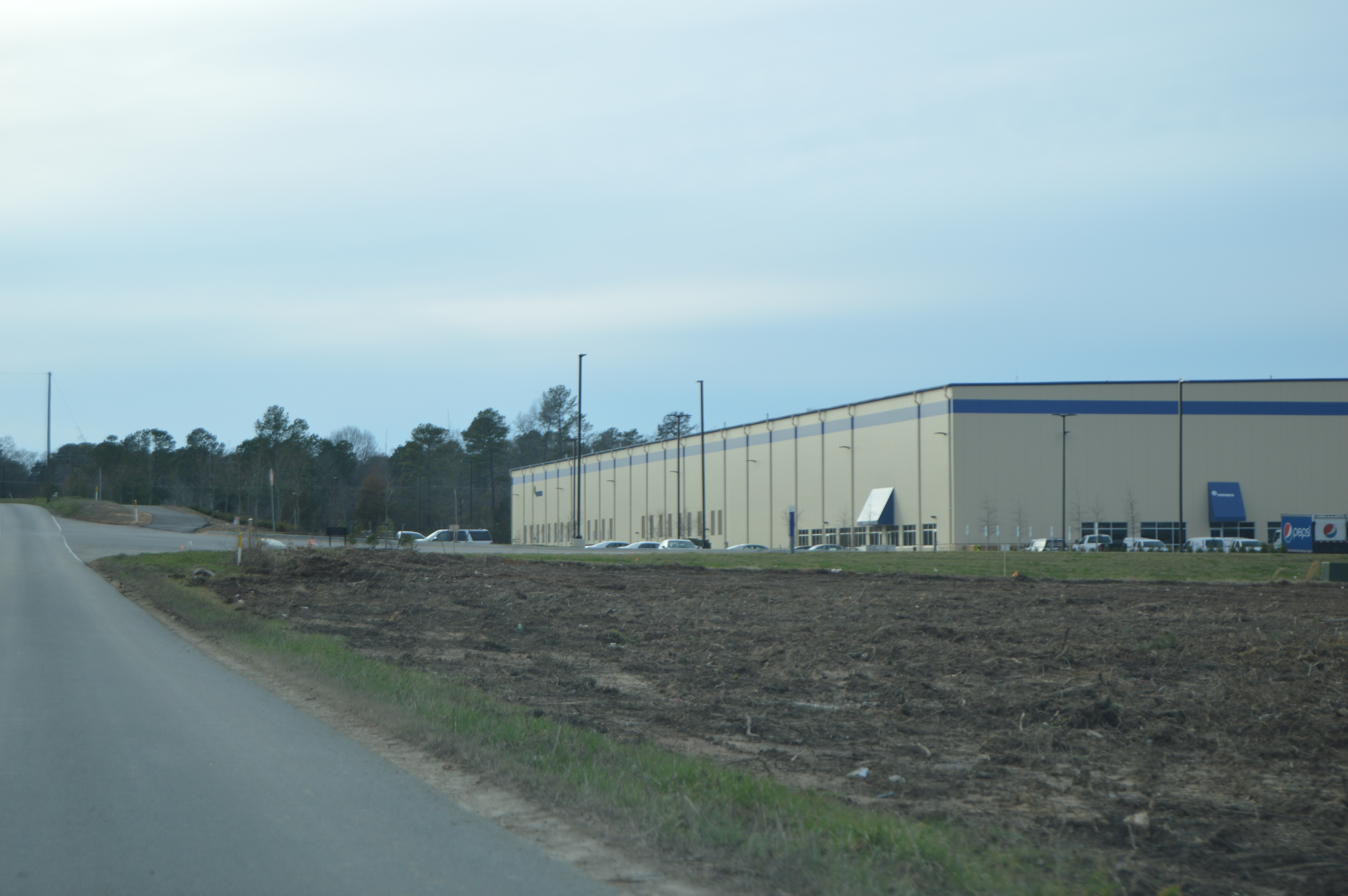
- Site of the plantation

- Location within Virginia Location within the United States
- Location: 1608 Willis Rd., Chimney Corner, Virginia
- Coordinates: 37°24′14″N 77°24′48″W
- Area: 7 acres (2.8 ha)
- Built: c. 1805
- NRHP reference No.: 75002019
- VLR No.: 020-0122

Significant dates
- Added to NRHP: September 18, 1975
- Designated VLR: unknown

Kingsland, also known as Richmond View, was a historic plantation house located at Chimney Corner, Chesterfield County, Virginia. It was built about 1805, and consisted of a 1 1/2-story, frame structure with a rear ell. The main section measured 20 feet by 40 feet and the rear ell extended 55 feet. The house featured a center chimney. Also on the property was a contributing smokehouse. It was moved and reconstructed in 1994.

It was listed on the National Register of Historic Places in 1975.
