= Gullhaug, Akershus =

Akershus
- Village
- Interactive map of Akershus
- Coordinates: 59°56′26″N 10°29′38″E
- Time zone: UTC+01:00 (CET)

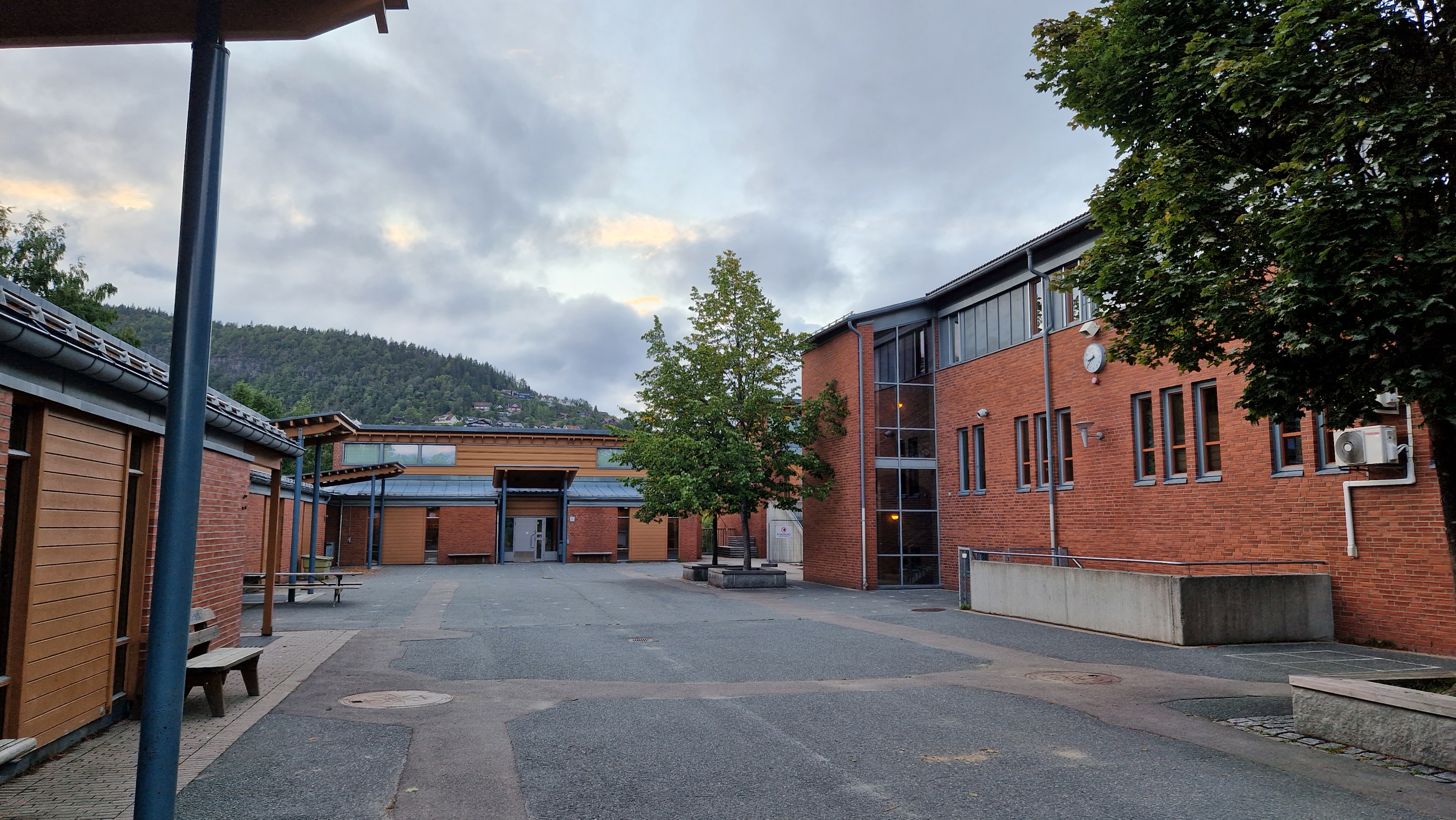
Several buildings located in the district

Gullhaug is a district in the municipality of Bærum, Norway. Its population (2007) is 3,468. The area was developed with housing in the 1980s.
