= Rohrbach =

Rohrbach or Röhrbach may refer to:

== Places ==
=== Municipalities in Switzerland ===
- Rohrbach, Switzerland, in the canton of Bern

=== Municipalities in Germany ===
- Rohrbach, Bavaria, in the district of Pfaffenhofen, Bavaria
- Rohrbach, Birkenfeld, in the district of Birkenfeld, Rhineland-Palatinate
- Rohrbach, Rhein-Hunsrück, in the district of Rhein-Hunsrück, Rhineland-Palatinate
- Rohrbach, Palatinate, in the district Südliche Weinstraße, Rhineland-Palatinate
- Rohrbach, Saalfeld-Rudolstadt, in the district of Saalfeld-Rudolstadt, Thuringia
- Rohrbach, Weimarer Land, in the district Weimarer Land, Thuringia
- Rohrbach am Gießhübel, in the district of Heilbronn in Baden-Württemberg
- Rohrbach, Heidelberg, a district of the city of Heidelberg, Baden-Württemberg

==== Former German-Russian colony ====
- Novosvitlivka, Mykolaiv Oblast, Ukraine (formerly Rohrbach, Beresan District, Odessa, South Russia)

=== Municipalities in France ===
- Rohrbach-lès-Bitche in Moselle
- Rorbach-lès-Dieuze in Moselle
- Saint-Jean-Rohrbach in Moselle

=== Districts and municipalities in Austria ===
- Rohrbach District, in Upper Austria
  - Berg bei Rohrbach, a former township in Rohrbach District, since 2015 part of Rohrbach-Berg
  - Rohrbach-Berg, capital of Rohrbach District
  - Rohrbach in Oberösterreich, former capital of Rohrbach District, since 2015 part of Rohrbach-Berg
- Rohrbach an der Gölsen, in Lower Austria
- Rohrbach an der Lafnitz, in Styria
- Rohrbach bei Mattersburg, in Burgenland
- Rohrbach-Steinberg, former municipality, Styria

=== Municipalities in the Czech Republic ===
- Hrušovany u Brna (Rohrbach was German name), village in South Moravia

=== Village in Luxembourg ===
- Lasauvage, in the commune of Differdange (Rohrbach was German name, now seldom-used)

=== Rivers of Germany ===
- Rohrbach (Fulda), Hesse, tributary of the Fulda
- Rohrbach (Osterbach), Hesse, tributary of the Osterbach
- Rohrbach (Saar), Saarland, tributary of the Saar
- Röhrbach, North Rhine-Westphalia
- Rohrbach (Tauber), Bavaria and Baden-Württemberg, tributary of the Tauber
- Rohrbach (Felchbach), Bavaria, tributary of the Felchbach

== People with the surname ==
- John F. D. Rohrbach (1889–1968), American business executive
- Kelly Rohrbach (born 1990), American model and actress
- Hans Rohrbach (1903–1993), German mathematician and cryptanalyst
- Marcel Rohrbach (1933–2012), French racing cyclist
- Larry Rohrbach, American politician
- Paul Rohrbach (1869–1956), German writer
- Paul Rohrbach (botanist) (1846–1871), German botanist
- Sebastian Rohrbach (born 1975), German actor
- Thomas Rohrbach (born 1949), retired footballer
- Wenno von Rohrbach, first Master (Herrmeister) of the Livonian Brothers of the Sword, leading the Order from 1204 to 1209

== Other ==
- Rohrbach Metall-Flugzeugbau, former aircraft company
- Rohrbach Brewing Company, brewery in Rochester, New York, USA
