= 70th Armor Regiment =

US Army military unit

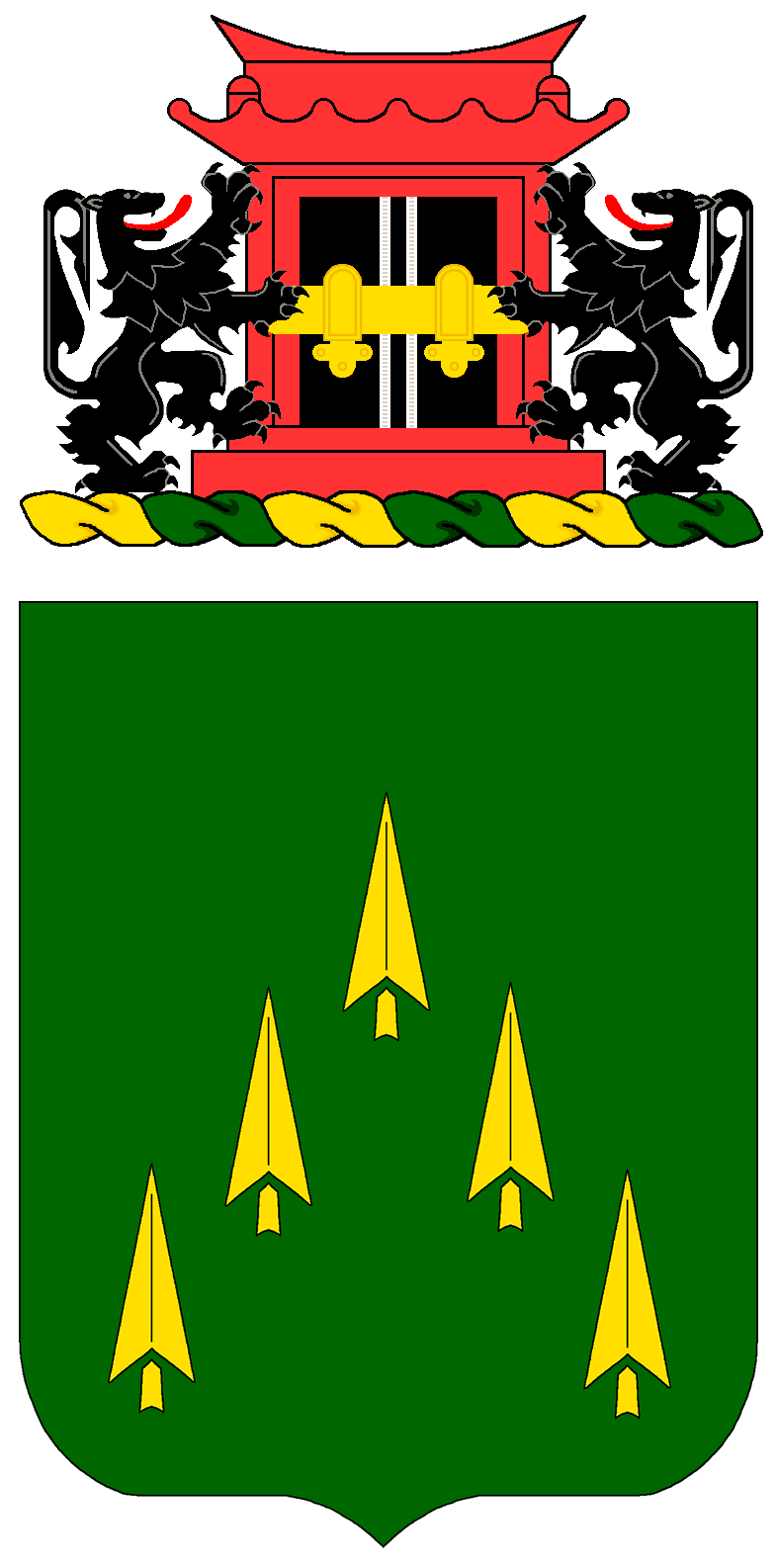
- 70th Armor Regiment coat of arms
- Active: 1940 – present
- Country: United States
- Branch: Army
- Type: Armor
- Part of: 1st Armored Division, 1-1 Armored Brigade Combat Team
- Garrison/HQ: 1st Armored Division, Fort Bliss (El Paso) Texas, 79904
- Nickname: "Thunderbolts"
- Motto: "Strike Swiftly"
- Campaign credit: World War II: Algeria-French Morocco; Sicily (with Arrowhead); Normandy (with Arrowhead); Northern France; Rhineland; Ardennes-Alsace; Central Europe; Korean War: UN Defensive; UN Offensive; CCF Intervention; First UN Counteroffensive; CCF Spring Offensive; UN Summer-Fall Offensive; Second Korean Winter; Gulf War (2nd & 4th Battalions): Defense of Saudi Arabia; Liberation and Defense of Kuwait; Cease-Fire; Operation Enduring Freedom (4th Battalion): Consolidation III; Operation Iraqi Freedom: Liberation of Iraq (2nd Battalion); Transition of Iraq (2nd Battalion); Iraqi Governance (2nd Battalion); Iraqi Sovereignty (4th Battalion)

Insignia
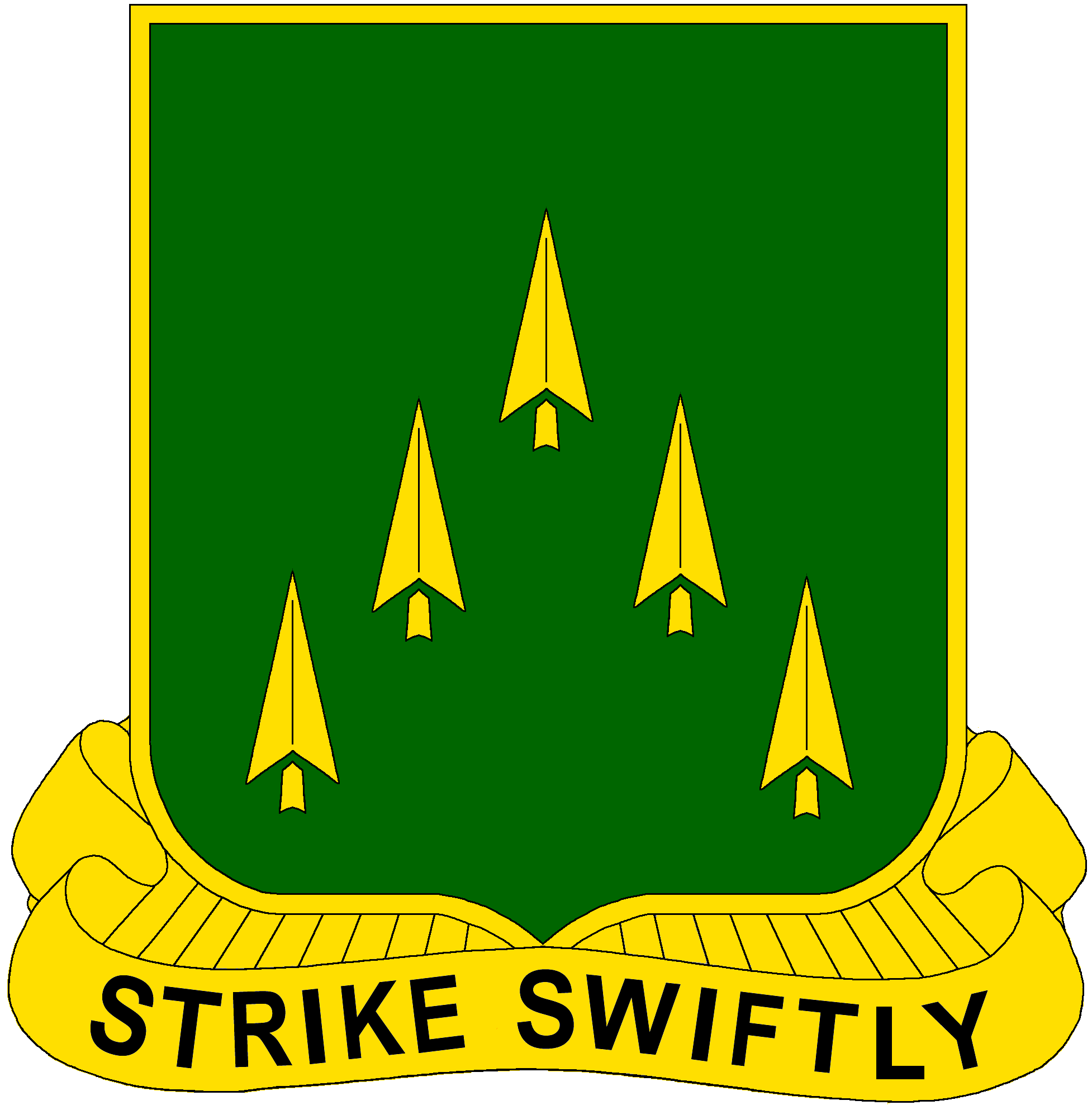
- Distinctive unit insignia

The 70th Armor Regiment is an armored unit of the United States Army. It was constituted as the 70th Tank Battalion in July 1940, an independent tank battalion intended to provide close support to infantry units. In this role, it saw action in the Mediterranean and European Theater of Operations, making assault landings and fighting with the 9th Infantry Division in North Africa, and with the 1st Infantry Division in Sicily. The battalion supported the 4th Infantry Division on Utah Beach during the D-Day landings in France, and fought with the 4th Infantry Division through the remainder of World War II. The 70th Tank Battalion was one of the first three tank battalions to deploy to Korea in the Korean War, where it saw significant action, primarily with the 1st Cavalry Division.

The 70th Armor Regiment was designated a parent organization as part of the Combat Arms Regimental System (CARS) in 1963. When CARS was replaced by the U.S. Army Regimental System (USARS) system in 1981, the 70th Armor Regiment continued to carry the colors and honors of the regiment. Although there is no regimental headquarters, battalions of the 70th Armor Regiment have since served in various theaters and campaigns. Units of the battalion participated in Operation Desert Shield/Desert Storm, and have served in Southwest Asia as part of the Global War on Terrorism.

On 9 October 2012, the last active battalion of the 70th Armor Regiment, the 4th Battalion, 70th Armor Regiment was inactivated along with its parent headquarters, the 170th Infantry Brigade (Separate) in Baumholder, Germany. On 9 October 2014, the 2nd Battalion, 70th Armor regiment was activated and assigned to the 2nd Brigade, 1st Infantry Division, at Fort Riley, Kansas.

With 13 unit awards and 22 campaign streamers, the 70th Armor Regiment is the most decorated armor unit in the United States Army.

== Organization ==
The 70th Tank Battalion, and later the battalions of the 70th Armor Regiment, saw numerous changes to the table of organization and equipment over the years. The battalion was initially formed as a light tank battalion, then converted to a standard tank battalion configuration during World War II. After the war, it was redesignated a heavy tank battalion, in which guise it fought in the Korean War. When reactivated in the early 1960s, the battalions were reorganized again. They saw active service with relatively minor changes until the 1980s when they were reorganized again as modernized tank battalions.

=== Light tank battalion ===
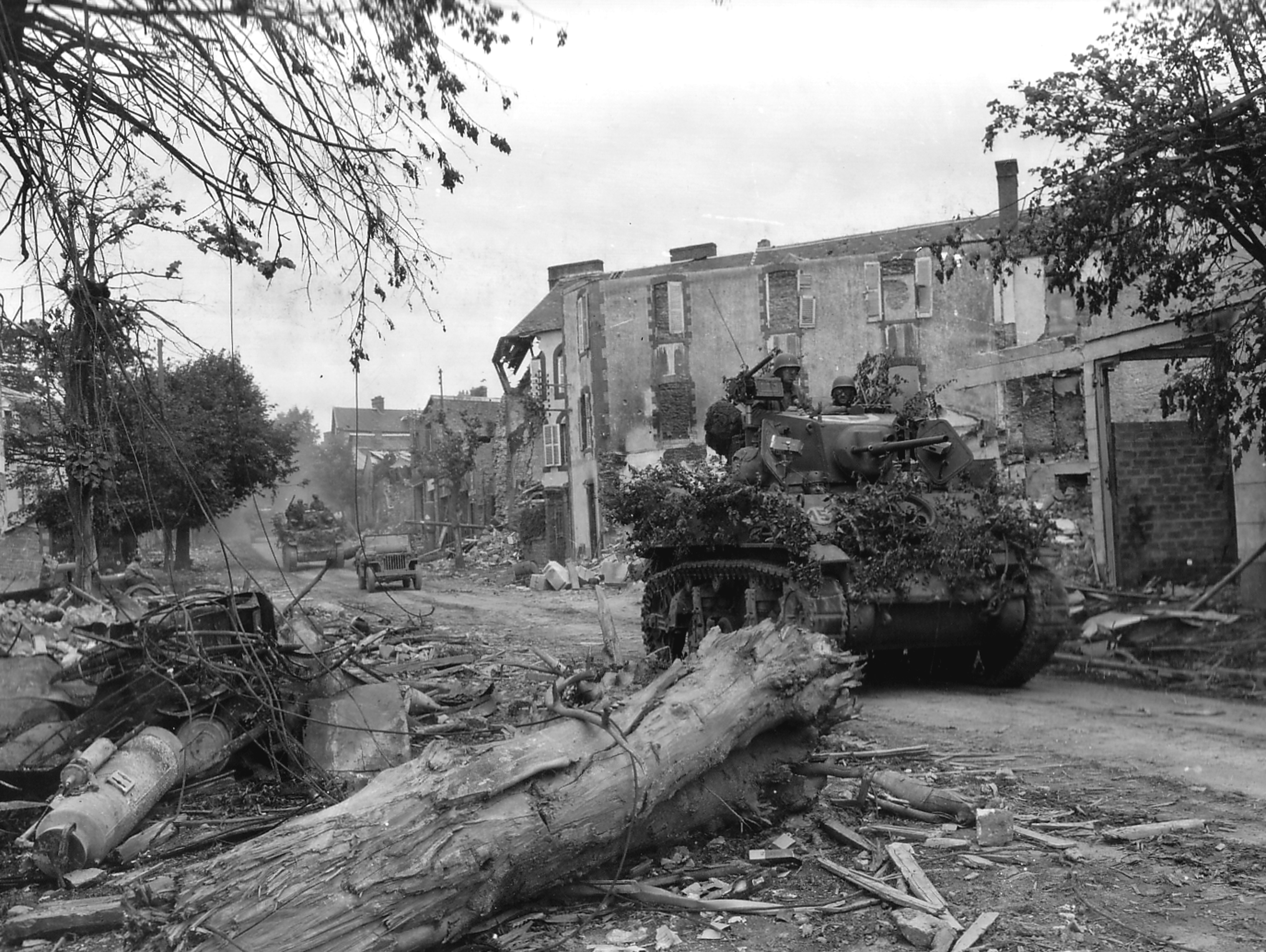
Light Tank M5A1 passes through the wrecked streets of Coutances.

As a light tank battalion, the 70th Tank Battalion was equipped with M5 Stuart tanks, an updated version of the M3 Stuart. The battalion was organized as follows:

Headquarters and Headquarters Company (HHC) –This company included the battalion staff and the battalion command headquarters section, including three M5s. The headquarters company also included a reconnaissance section equipped with "peeps" (jeeps), a mortar platoon equipped with 81 mm mortar half-tracks, and an assault gun platoon equipped with three M8 howitzer motor carriages (M8 HMC), M5 chassis upgunned with short-barreled 75mm howitzers in open topped turrets.

Service Company –This Company consisted primarily of the battalion maintenance platoon and the battalion supply and transportation platoon.

Companies A, B, and C – each lettered company was identically organized with three platoons of five M5 tanks, plus a company headquarters tank section of two additional M5s for a total of 17 tanks per company. Each company also had a maintenance section, which had an additional M5 as a recovery vehicle, as there were no suitable light recovery vehicles based on the M5 chassis.

=== Medium tank battalion ===
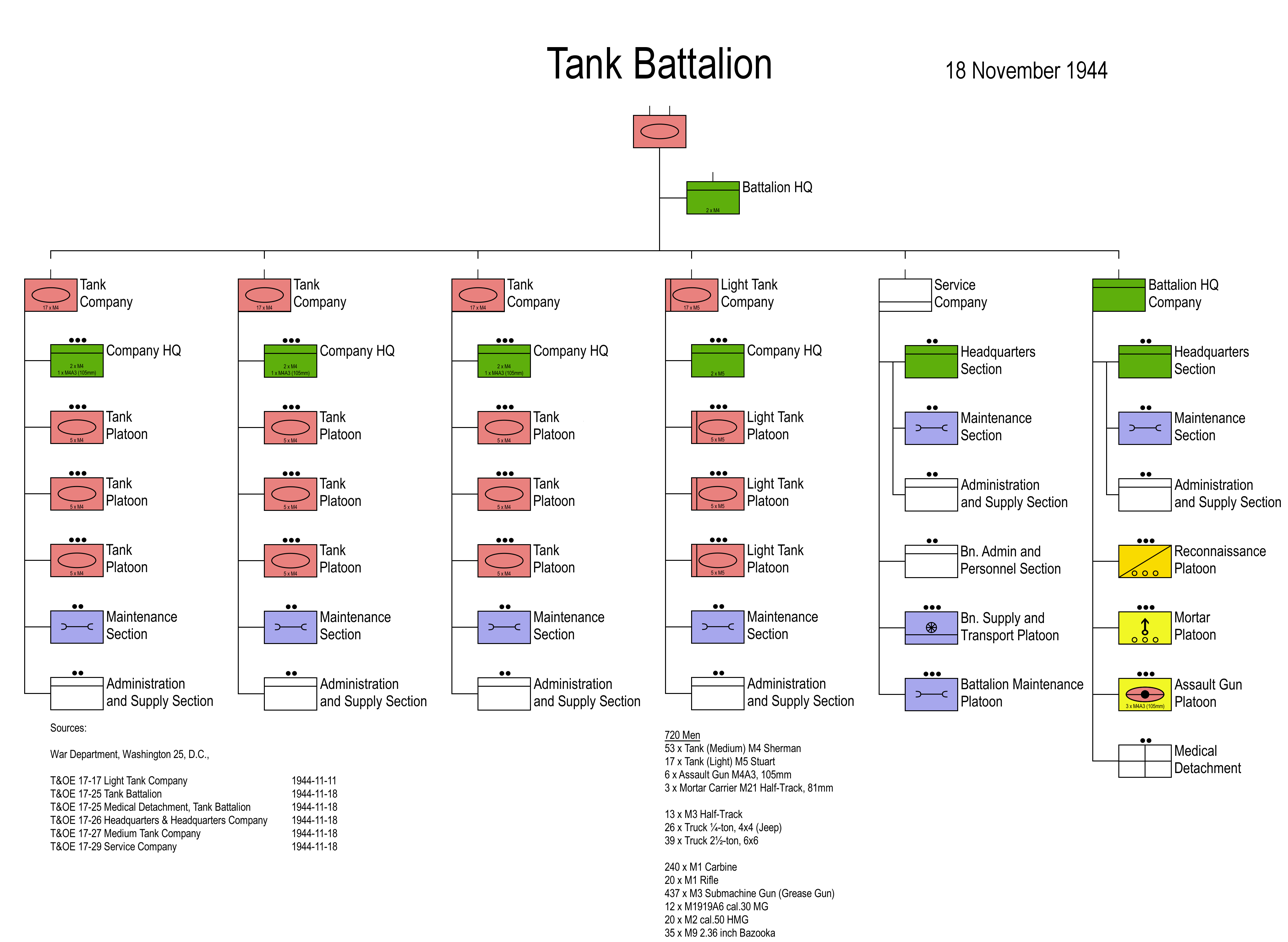
World War II Tank Battalion Structure - November 1944.

The 70th Tank Battalion followed the standard organization of a U.S. medium tank battalion during World War II. It consisted of a Headquarters and Headquarters Company, Service Company, three medium tank companies (Companies A, B, and C) and a light tank company (Company D). The 70th Tank Battalion completely reorganized when it converted from a light tank battalion to the standard medium tank battalion organization. The M5 Stuarts were replaced with M4 Shermans and the new organization was as follows:

Headquarters and Headquarters Company (HHC) –This company included the battalion staff and the battalion command headquarters section, including two M4s. The headquarters company maintained the reconnaissance section and mortar platoon, while the assault gun platoon was re-equipped with M4 tanks armed with 105 mm assault guns in enclosed turrets. The 70th also consolidated the three assault guns assigned to the tank companies into the assault gun platoon.

Service Company – consisted primarily of the battalion maintenance platoon and the battalion supply and transportation platoon. The supply and transportation platoon more than doubled the number of trucks in order to support the increased logistical requirements of the thirstier and heavier-gunned Sherman medium tanks compared to the lighter Stuarts.

Companies A, B, and C – the medium tank companies closely followed the earlier organization of the light tank companies, except they were now equipped with M4 Shermans instead of the M5 Stuarts. Each company was still organized with three platoons of five tanks, plus the company headquarters tank section with two additional tanks for a total of 17 tanks per company. Each tank company maintenance section now had a dedicated M32 Tank Recovery Vehicle, also based on the M4 chassis. Each Company was also supposed to have an assault gun, but, as mentioned above, this was transferred to the battalion's assault gun platoon.

Company D – the new Company D was the medium tank battalion’s light tank company. The light tank company mirrored the organization of the medium tank companies, but still had M5 Stuart tanks. Each company was still organized with three platoons of five tanks, plus the company headquarters tank section with two additional tanks for a total of 17 tanks. The company maintenance section was also equipped with an M32 Tank Recovery Vehicle in case—as sometimes happened—a platoon of medium tanks was attached to the company to provide heavier firepower.

=== Heavy tank battalion ===
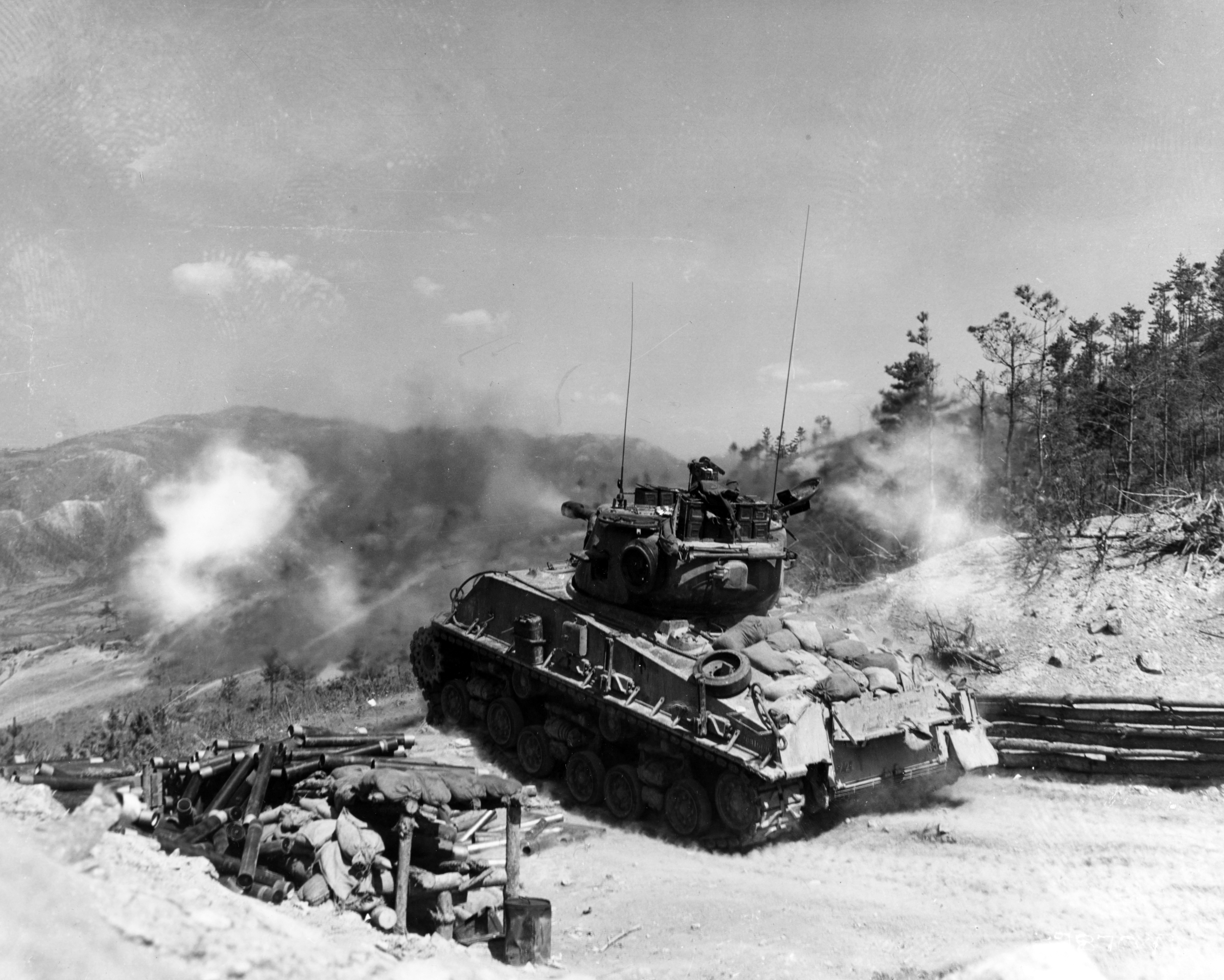
Last type in US service: M4A3(76)W HVSS Sherman used as artillery in firing position during the Korean War

The 70th Tank Battalion once again underwent massive reorganization when it was converted into a heavy tank battalion. The primary changes were in the tank companies, which were reduced to three. The Heavy Tank Battalion organization is as follows:

Headquarters and Headquarters Company (HHC) –This Company included the battalion staff and the battalion command headquarters section, including the two tanks in the headquarters tank section. The headquarters company still had a reconnaissance section and mortar platoon. The assault gun platoon was deleted from the organization.

Service Company –This Company still consisted primarily of the battalion maintenance platoon and the battalion supply and transportation platoon.

Companies A and C –These companies were equipped with M4A3E8 Sherman tanks. This tank was equipped with a high velocity 76 mm gun and a heavier horizontal volute suspension. The heavy tank companies were now organized into four platoons of five tanks, plus the two company headquarters tanks, for a total of 22 tanks in each company. The tank recovery vehicle was now an M74.

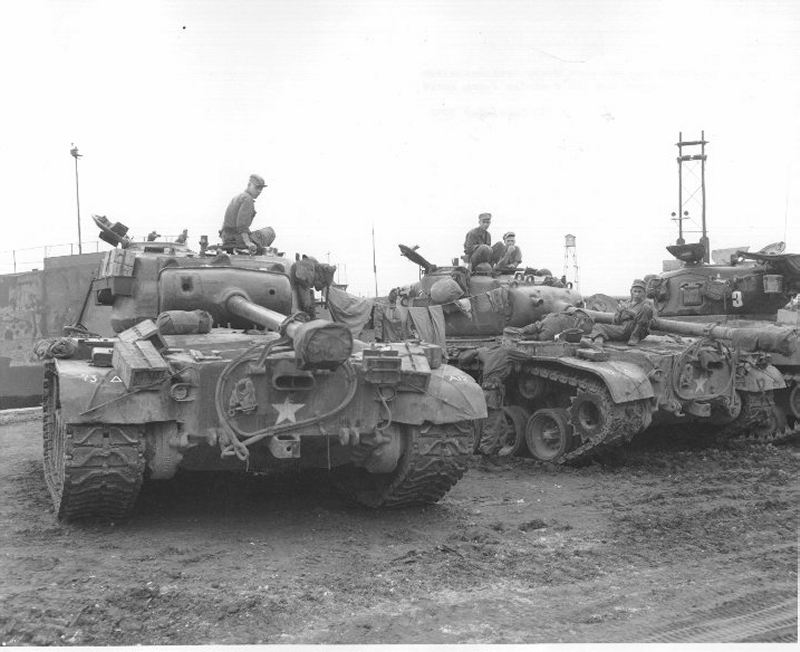
Pershing and Sherman tanks at the Pusan Docks, Korea.

Company B –This Company was equipped with M26 Pershing tanks, equipped with a 90 mm gun. Despite the heavier gun, the Pershing was not well liked as it was unreliable and difficult to maintain. While in Korea, the Pershings were withdrawn and replaced with M4A3E8 Sherman tanks. Otherwise the company organization was identical to Companies A and C.

=== Regimental battalion ===
When the 70th re-emerged in 1963 as part of the Combat Arms Regimental System, it once again had a completely new organization. The battalion still had a headquarters and headquarters company and three tank companies. However, the service company had been replaced by the combat support company, which also took over several of the functions previously contained within the headquarters company. Here is the following companies within the regimental battalion:

Headquarters and Headquarters Company (HHC) –This Company included the battalion staff and the battalion command headquarters section, which now had three tanks in the headquarters tank section. The headquarters company now had the maintenance section and support platoon assigned to it, along with the medical platoon.

Combat Support Company –The Combat support Company consisted primarily of the scout platoon and mortar platoon. These platoons were primarily mounted on M113 variants.

Companies A, B, and C – the line tank companies were equipped with M60 tank variants. The companies were once again organized into three platoons of five tanks, with two tanks in the company headquarters tank section. The company still maintained a maintenance section, now equipped with the M88 Recovery Vehicle.

=== Division 86 battalion ===
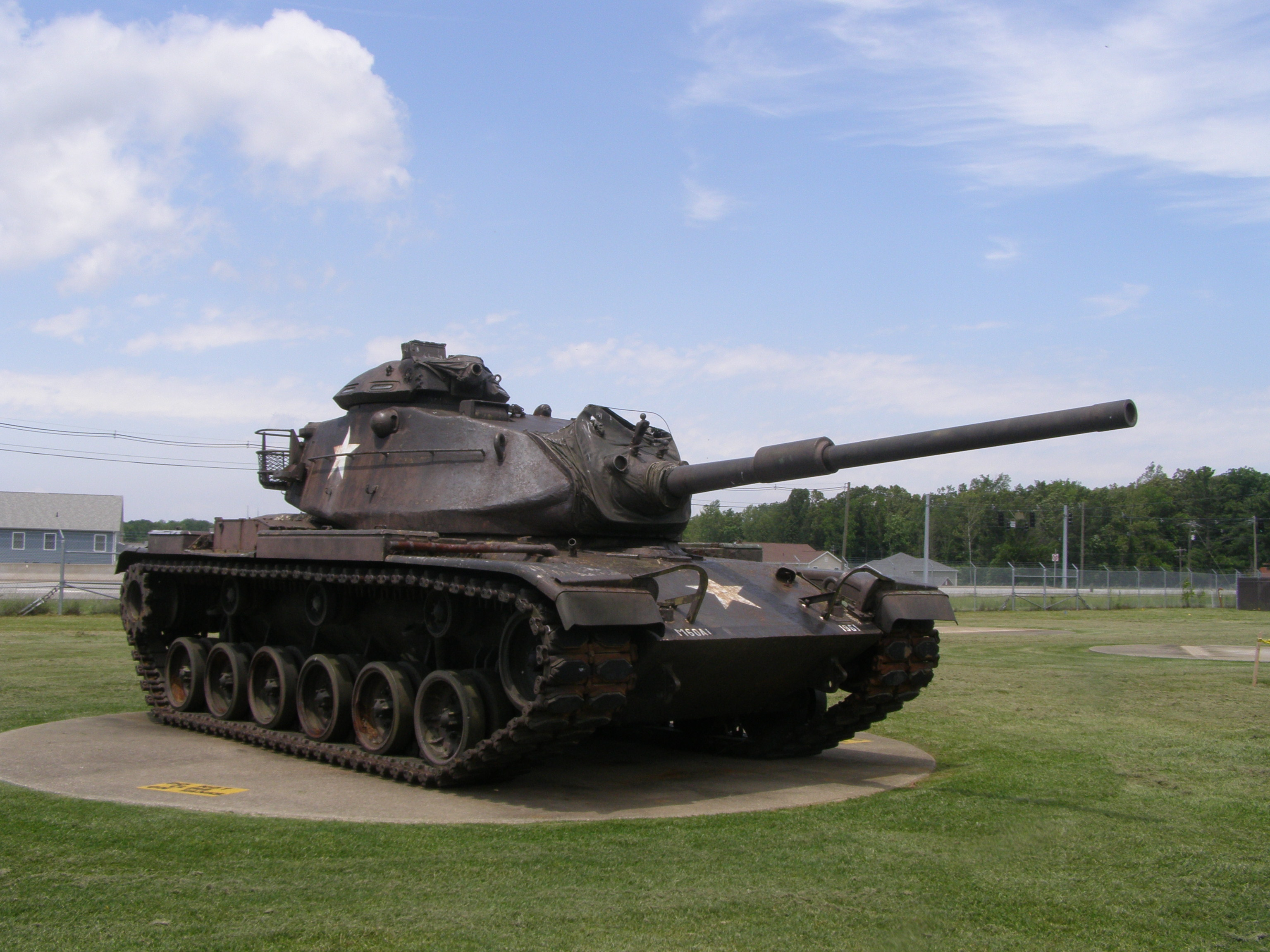
M60A1 tank on display at Fort Knox KY in 2011

When the Army reorganized in the mid-1980s, under what was termed the "Division 86" force structure, the battalions of the 70th Armor Regiment took on a new structure. The combat support company was eliminated, with its functions consolidated into the headquarters company. An additional line tank company was added, bringing the total to four; these companies were made considerably leaner, with all but the most essential company administration and supply functions consolidated into the headquarters company. the organization here is as follows:

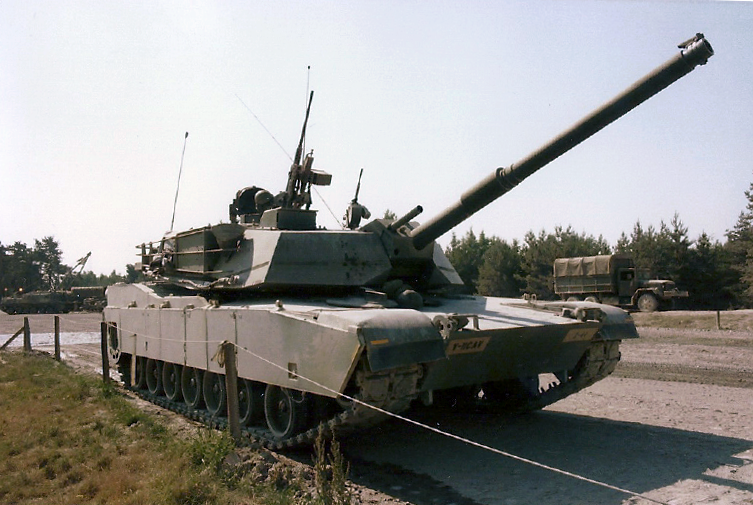
105 mm M1 Abrams tank at Grafenwöhr Training Area in Germany, 1986

Headquarters and Headquarters Company (HHC) –This Company included the battalion staff and the battalion command headquarters section, with the headquarters tank section once again reduced to only two tanks. The headquarters company now held all the maintenance assets of the battalion consolidated into one very large platoon, although each tank company had a maintenance team attached to it for operations in the field. A similar arrangement was made with the medical platoon, which consisted of two aid stations under battalion control and a medical evacuation team attached to each tank company. The scout and mortar platoons were assigned to the company under direct battalion control. The support platoon remained in the headquarters company and all the mess sections were consolidated to operate as a single mess team for the battalion.

Companies A, B, C, and D – each company had three tank platoons which, for the first time, were reduced to four tanks per platoon. The company headquarters section still had two tanks, for a total of 14 tanks per company. Initially, the tanks were M60A1 variants, but were later replaced with M1 Abrams tanks.

== World War II ==
=== Activation and early service ===
The 70th Tank Battalion was formed as an independent medium tank battalion on 15 July 1940 at Fort Meade, Maryland from elements of the 34th Infantry Regiment and the 67th Infantry Regiment (Medium Tanks). This made the 70th Tank Battalion one of the founding units of the new armored force of the U.S. Army, along with the I Armored Corps and 1st and 2nd Armored Divisions, and the first tank battalion not assigned to an armored division. Despite its initial designation as a medium tank battalion, the 70th was organized as a light tank battalion and received only light tanks.

With roots in the Regular Army at a time when the U.S. Army was rapidly expanding with draftees, the battalion was initially able to select junior officers, sergeants, and new soldiers of superior qualities. This included the top graduates of Officer Candidate School and only high school graduate enlisted men (at a time when high school graduates were a small part of the population).

In addition to home station training at Fort Meade, the battalion trained at Indiantown Gap, Pennsylvania and Fort Knox, Kentucky in early 1941. In July and August 1941, the battalion began its association with the 1st Infantry Division with which it would later serve in combat when Company A first practiced amphibious landings with the division at New River, North Carolina along the shoreline of what is now Camp Lejeune as part of the Carolina Maneuvers to evaluate Army tactical doctrine.

Upon the basis of this meager but unique training experience, the 1st Infantry Division and the 70th Tank Battalion were alerted for deployment on 4 January 1942, less than a month after the attack on Pearl Harbor. The sailing generated rumors of conducting an actual landing on the island of Martinique, which was a Caribbean outpost of Vichy France and whose Fort-de-France Bay was one of the best deepwater ports in the Western Hemisphere.

This deployment was in fact a planned amphibious training exercise. The 70th Tank Battalion (minus Company C) sailed from Brooklyn Navy Yard with the 1st Infantry Division on 9 January 1942 and appeared off the coast of Culebra, Puerto Rico before conducting landing operations on the Mid-Atlantic coast. The landings were originally also planned to take place on Sand Island in the Core Banks, North Carolina but were rescheduled and took place on Cape Henry, Virginia. (Note: The rumor of an invasion force to seize Martinique has made its way into authoritative sources, including Hall’s History of the 70th Tank Battalion and Jensen’s Strike Swiftly, which are cited elsewhere in this article and otherwise serve as reliable records of the battalion’s combat history, as well as other references of the early World War II history of the 1st Infantry Division. The threat that Martinique posed as a potential base for Nazi U-Boats nevertheless led the War Department to plan “Operation Bungalow” to occupy the island, using the 1st Infantry Division, the 70th Tank Battalion and the 1st Marine Brigade (later redesignated the 1st Marine Division) as the assault force, although the plan was never executed.)

As the wartime buildup began in earnest in 1942, the battalion underwent considerable turbulence. In February 1942 Company C was detached, redesignated as the 10th Light Tank Company and sent for garrison duty in Iceland, with a new Company C being formed in May. In August, six officers and 135 men were reassigned to form the cadre of the 746th Tank Battalion. And finally as preparations for combat became earnest, Company A was detached on 17 September and sent to Camp Dix, New Jersey. On 26 September, the company sailed from New York. With stops at Belfast, Northern Ireland, Greenock, Scotland, and Inverary, Scotland, the company was preparing to land with the 39th Regimental Combat Team, 9th Infantry Division at Algiers as part of Operation Torch.

=== North Africa ===
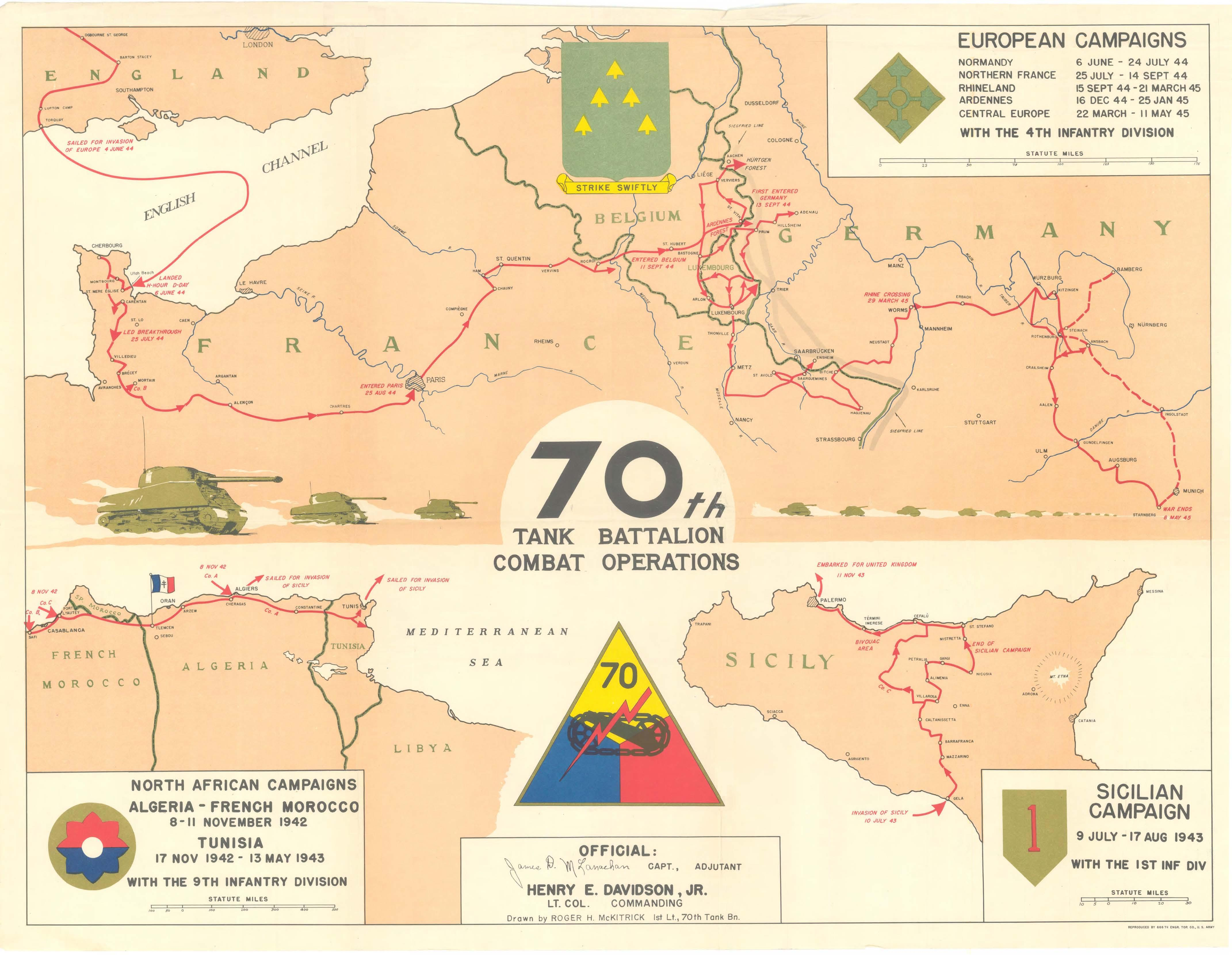
Campaign map showing the route of the 70th Tank Battalion across North Africa, Sicily, and Europe during World War II. U.S. Army

The 70th Tank Battalion landed in North Africa not as a battalion, but as three widely dispersed companies, each attached to a separate assault element and all landing on 8 November 1942. The battalion headquarters and "residue" initially remained in the United States.

Company A landed with the 2nd Battalion, 39th Infantry Regiment, 9th Infantry Division at Algiers, part of the Eastern Task Force of Operation Torch. Initial ground combat was light, but the company faced repeated air raids when it began guarding the Glida airport. Company A had light duties in Algiers until they reported to Col. Edson Raff and the 509th Parachute Infantry Regiment at Fériana, Tunisia. The attachment to the 509th was brief, and Company A soon found itself primarily attached to French combat units, and occasionally British, in the vicinity of the Ousseltia Valley for the remainder of the North African campaign. Along with Company A, 601st Tank Destroyer Battalion, the company was the only American unit in the sector. As Allied units closed on Bizerte and Tunis in the final stages of the campaign, German and Italian troops preferred to surrender to the company of American light tanks rather than the British or French. The estimate of prisoners taken by Company A between 11–13 May 1943 tallied between 17–20,000. Company A had clearly impressed their French allies: 25 men received the Croix de Guerre and the company was selected as the honor guard for the international victory parade in Tunis on 20 May. Finally in June 1942, Company A rejoined the rest of the 70th Tank Battalion at Arzew, Algeria.

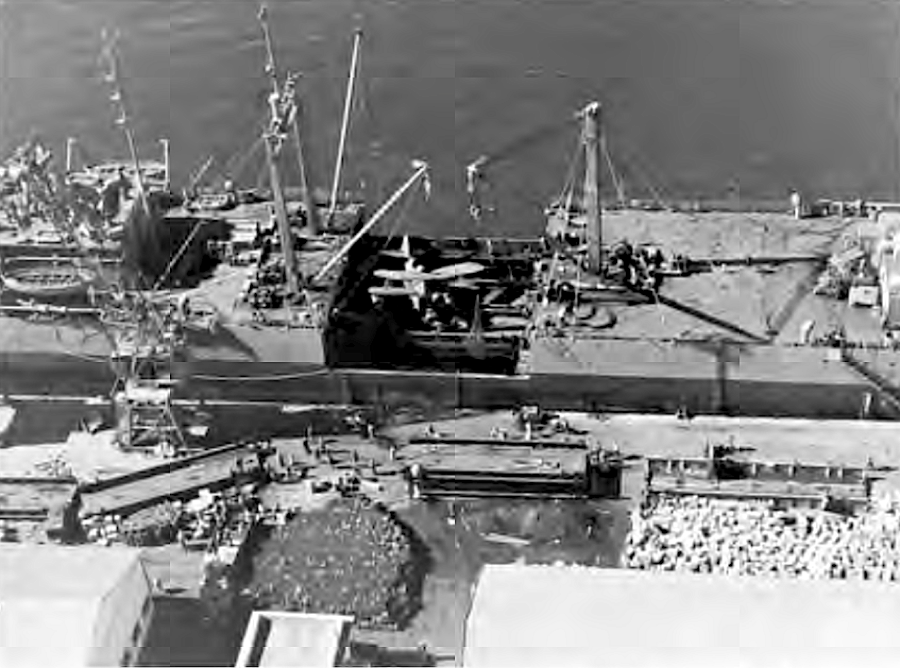
Lakehurst, formerly Seatrain New Jersey, after discharging medium tanks at Safi, French protectorate in Morocco.

Company B landed with the 47th Regimental Combat Team of the 9th Infantry Division at Safi, Morocco in order to secure the port. The port was needed to facilitate unloading the medium tanks of the 2nd Armored Division so they could advance on the primary objective at Casablanca. Meeting only light resistance, the company suffered no casualties and the port was secured by 1530. The company remained in place while a larger force built around the 3rd Infantry Division moved toward Casablanca. Shortly thereafter, Company B moved through Casablanca and rejoined Company C near Port Lyautey.

Company C's objective, the all-weather airport at Port Lyautey, was to have been taken on 8 November. However, the company was put ashore at Mehdya Plage, three miles from the intended landing site. Due to this navigational error and the more spirited response from the French defenders than at the other landing sites, the airfield did not fall until 11 November. With their assault role completed, Company C reverted to routine duties near Port Lyautey. After Company B rejoined them, the two companies remained in the area through January 1943.

When the tank companies deployed for North Africa, the battalion headquarters and other elements remained in Fort Bragg, North Carolina until 1 January 1943. The remainder of the battalion decamped for New York and boarded the SS Santa Rosa at Staten Island on 13 January. The Santa Rosa docked at Casablanca on 29 January 1943.

With most of the battalion (still minus Company A) now reunited, the 70th Tank Battalion moved by rail from Casablanca to Tlemcen, Algeria on 4 February 1943. At Tlemcen, the battalion was made responsible for training Free French soldiers who later formed much of the cadre of the 2nd French Armored Division. It continued in this role until May 1943, when it was ordered to proceed to Arzew, Algeria. There Company A finally caught up with the rest of the battalion, and the unit was all together for the first time since September 1942.

=== Sicily ===
The 70th Tank Battalion was selected to support the 1st Infantry Division in the assault landings in Sicily for Operation Husky in July 1943. The battalion came ashore piecemeal starting on 10 July, with men and equipment offloading separately. Although the first men came ashore in the assault wave, their tanks did not arrive until D+4. They fought for the first time as a battalion and used the lessons learned in North Africa to fight their light tanks effectively against much heavier German armor, on one occasion destroying nine Mark IV tanks without losing a tank.

Company C was detached from 1st Infantry Division on 17 July and attached to the 45th Infantry Division for the remainder of the Sicilian campaign. In exchange, the 1st Infantry Division received a company of M4 Shermans from the 753rd Tank Battalion. Due to the poor terrain for tank operations, the 70th was pulled out of the line on 27 July and Company C rejoined the battalion on 31 July, although the battle for the island lasted until 17 August. The battalion began to receive new tanks to replace ones lost in combat and continued training for the next campaign, and naturally assumed they would be part of the Italian mainland invasion force. However, the battalion loaded aboard the SS Monterey on 11 November 1943, bound for England.

=== Operation Overlord and action in France ===
Based on the impression made on General Omar Bradley, commander of II Corps and future commander of the American landing forces in Normandy, the 70th Tank Battalion was reassigned from the Mediterranean Theater of Operations and transferred to England to participate in the Normandy landings. Brigadier General Theodore Roosevelt Jr., first as regimental commander of the 26th Infantry Regiment, then as assistant division commander of the 1st Infantry Division was also impressed by the performance of the 70th and worked successfully to have them attached for the landings to the 4th Infantry Division, where Roosevelt had been reassigned as assistant division commander.

The SS Monterey docked at Liverpool, England on 28 November 1943 and the personnel of the 70th Tank Battalion were transported to Ogbourne St. George, where the battalion was met by members of the 10th Light Tank Company, which had departed Iceland and arrived in England a week before the 70th Tank Battalion. With this new addition, the first requirement of the battalion was to reorganize and re-equip the battalion as a de facto medium tank battalion. The personnel from the 10th Light Tank Company were partitioned among the companies of the 70th Tank Battalion as well as to the 743rd Tank Battalion. With the addition of these personnel, the battalion was reorganized with Companies A, B, and C as M4 Sherman medium tank companies and D Company as an M5 Stuart light tank company. While at Ogbourne St. George, the battalion became familiar with the operation of the tanks. On 16 February 1944, they departed for Camp Barton Stacey, near Andover. From there, they had access to larger maneuver areas in which to conduct unit tactical training. The new camp also served as the base from which companies deployed to Wales to conduct gunnery training with the heavier 75 mm guns of the Shermans.

By this time it had been decided that Companies A and B would be equipped with amphibious dual drive (DD) tanks for the landings. They therefore began to receive specialized training in March 1944, first to become accustomed to the unique operating environment of the DD tanks, then with the tanks themselves, using British DD Valentine tanks, then later their own new DD Shermans. By April, the battalion moved to the Devonshire coast and began amphibious training with the 4th Infantry Division. In April 1944, the 70th Tank Battalion participated in Operation Tiger, a dress rehearsal for the Utah Beach landing, successfully navigating their DD tanks through the surf for the first time. Although there were heavy casualties during the training, both as a result of friendly fire incidents and a German raid on the convoy, the battalion suffered no casualties. In these final days before the landings, the battalion also received dozer tanks for the landings and a levy of combat engineers to help fill out the crews on the additional tanks. Although the engineers proved invaluable during the landings and subsequent combat in the Normandy hedgerows, the new personnel required a last minute shuffle of tank crews.

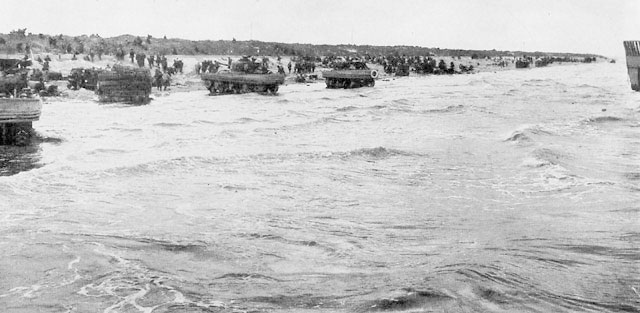
DD tanks of the 70th Battalion waiting to move off Utah Beach, 6 June 1944.

On D-Day the 70th Tank Battalion landed on Utah Beach supporting the 8th Infantry Regiment of the 4th Infantry Division. Unlike the DD tanks on Omaha Beach, most of the 70th's DD tanks made shore. All of Company B's tanks made it to the beach, although four Company A tanks and all but one of their crew were lost when their LCT hit a mine before the tanks could launch. The Company C tanks and dozer tanks were landed directly onshore and went to work clearing obstacles. Although the units landed about 2,000-yard off their designated objectives, they were fortunate that the actual landing sites were less well defended and General Roosevelt had them reoriented as they hit the beach. Company D, landing at H+260 was to link up with the 101st Airborne Division and provide them tank support as the paratroopers secured the causeways leading inland from the beaches.

The following day, the medium tank companies assisted the 8th Infantry Regiment in consolidating the beachhead by clearing the pockets of German resistance in and around Ste. Mère Église and linking up with the 82nd Airborne Division, preparatory to the push toward the port town of Cherbourg. Although the 70th Tank Battalion was one of the most experienced tank battalions in the U.S. Army at this point, the 4th Infantry Division was new to combat and the infantry-tank coordination was at first tenuous. But, within the first few weeks in Normandy the two arms were coordinating their maneuvers much better. Following the consolidation of the initial invasion objectives, the 70th Tank Battalion continued in support of the 4th Infantry Division as they moved northward to take the port city of Cherbourg, which fell on 27 June.

The 4th Infantry Division was recommitted in the main line of advance at the base of the Carentan peninsula, near Sainteny on 6 July. The 70th Tank Battalion moved with the division and engaged in brutal fighting in the hedgerows, made worse by heavy rainfall. After sustaining heavy casualties, the division and the battalion were withdrawn from the line on 15 July to rest and refit preparatory to playing a key role in the breakout from Normandy.

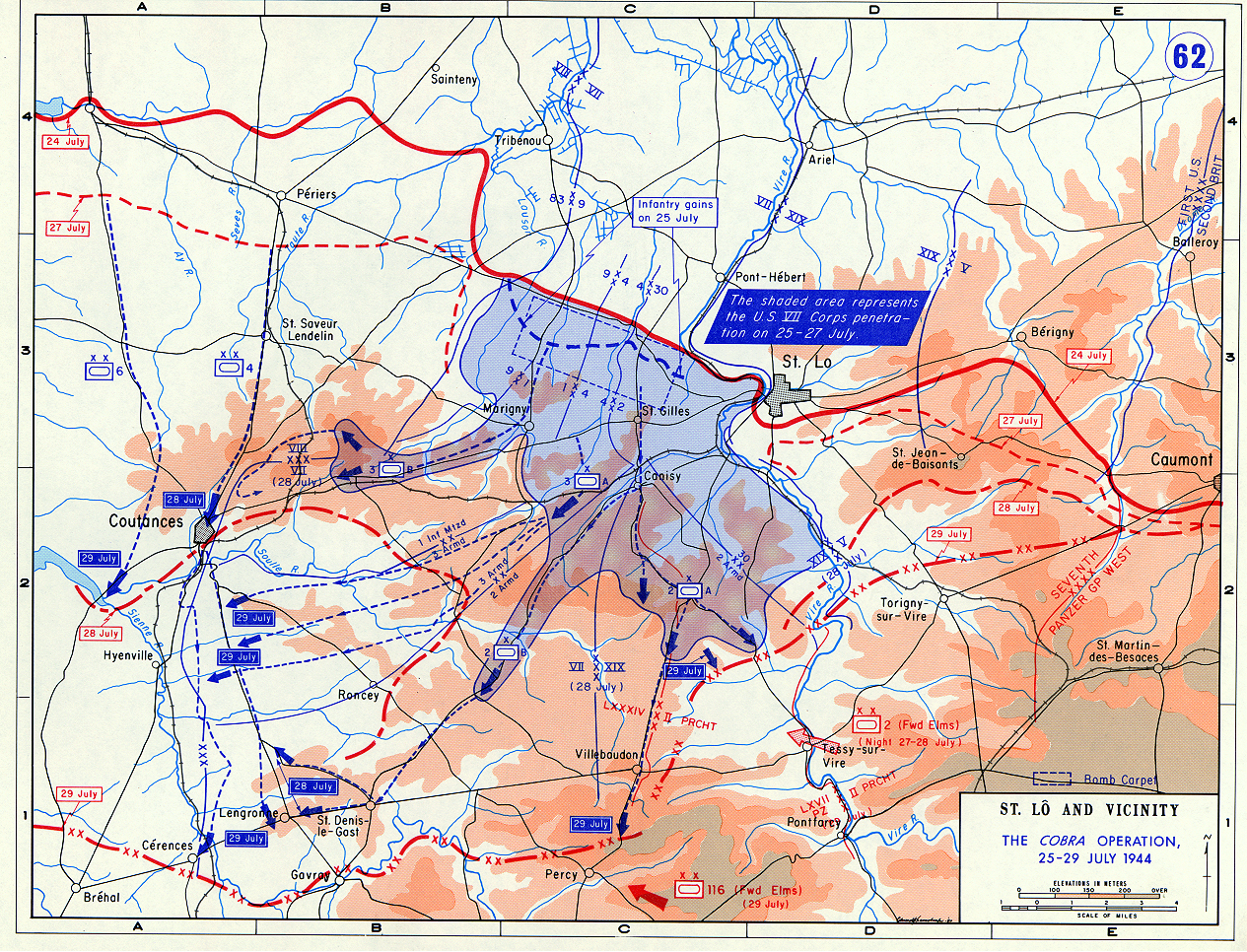
Operation Cobra 25–29 July 1944

The 4th Infantry Division was one of the assault divisions for Operation Cobra, the planned breakout from Normandy. Following the disastrous air bombardments of 24–25 July 1944, in which the 70th Tank Battalion only suffered minor material losses, the 8th Infantry Regiment began the assault across the St. Lô-Périers road. Initial progress was slow, just 2,500 meters on 25 July, and 8,000 meters the next day, but even these gains were quite large compared with the advances in the Norman hedgerows. The VII Corps commander committed the armor units to breakout on 27 July and with that German resistance crumbled.

Once the breakthrough had succeeded, the 70th was taken out of the line in order to perform much needed maintenance on their vehicles, and for the battalion, beginning with Company C, to begin receiving new Shermans mounting high-velocity 76 mm guns. The 70th began the race across France, at times halting only because they had outstripped their supply lines. By 24 August, the battalion was on the outskirts of Paris. Company D moved into Paris the next day, ostensibly to help secure the city, but found instead a tumultuous reception, while the medium tank companies continued the fight in the environs to the northeast of Paris. On 29 August, the battalion attacked en masse in the vicinity of Tremblay-les-Gonesse, a rare occurrence for an independent tank battalion normally parceled out as company and platoon attachments to elements of an infantry division.

The battalion continued the advance into northeastern France through the first half of September. Fuel shortages imposed several days of inactivity during which the battalion was able to catch up on maintenance. The 70th Tank Battalion crossed into Belgium on 11 September, and was also issued four flame-thrower tanks the same day. After a brief orientation on the flame-thrower tanks, the battalion crossed into Germany near Winterscheid on 13 September.

=== Siegfried Line and Hürtgen Forest ===
In crossing the German frontier, the 70th Tank Battalion found themselves immediately in the Siegfried Line. The 4th Infantry Division's sector was very hilly, heavily forested and ill-suited for tanks. Arriving in the sector at the end of summer, the weather quickly became cool and wet, and conditions worsened throughout their stay in this sector. As a result, although the infantry units of the division were initially engaged in penetrating the Siegfried Line, the 70th saw limited action until early November 1944. Tanks were employed in platoon strength and due to the restricted terrain and poor ground and weather conditions, the lighter M5's of Company D were often employed in lieu of the heavier M4 Shermans. The 4th Infantry Division did succeed in penetrating the Siegfried Line, but due to the poor terrain, lack of a road network with which to exploit the penetration, and no reserves to commit, the line was cleaned up and straightened, with little inclination on either side to force a decision. The ongoing limited supply of fuel for the tanks during much of this period did nothing to improve the outlook, though it did help restore the combat strength of the unit-strength which would be needed in their next operation.

The 70th Tank Battalion was alerted for movement on 6 November 1944. Their road march began late on 8 November and the battalion arrived near Heistern on the western edge of the Hürtgen Forest late the next morning. After several days of preparations and reconnaissance, the tanks were committed in support of the infantry regiments. Due to the poor weather and heavy forests, the tanks were limited to the narrow trails through the Hürtgen Forest. These were the object of carefully ranged artillery and repeated mining, as Germans would infiltrate the area at night and lay new mines. Numerous tanks were lost to mines, with the crews targeted by mortars and artillery as they abandoned or worked on their disabled tanks. The battalion suffered 8 killed and 39 wounded in three weeks of combat in the Hürtgen Forest, with 10 tanks lost and another 8 damaged due to enemy fire and mines. It was only when the infantry were able to push through to the eastern and northern reaches of the forest that the tanks could once again maneuver in reasonably open terrain. However, the division and the 70th Tank Battalion were so exhausted and depleted that they were instead withdrawn from the line beginning on 3 December and relocated over the next eight days to the vicinity of Luxembourg.

=== Battle of the Bulge ===
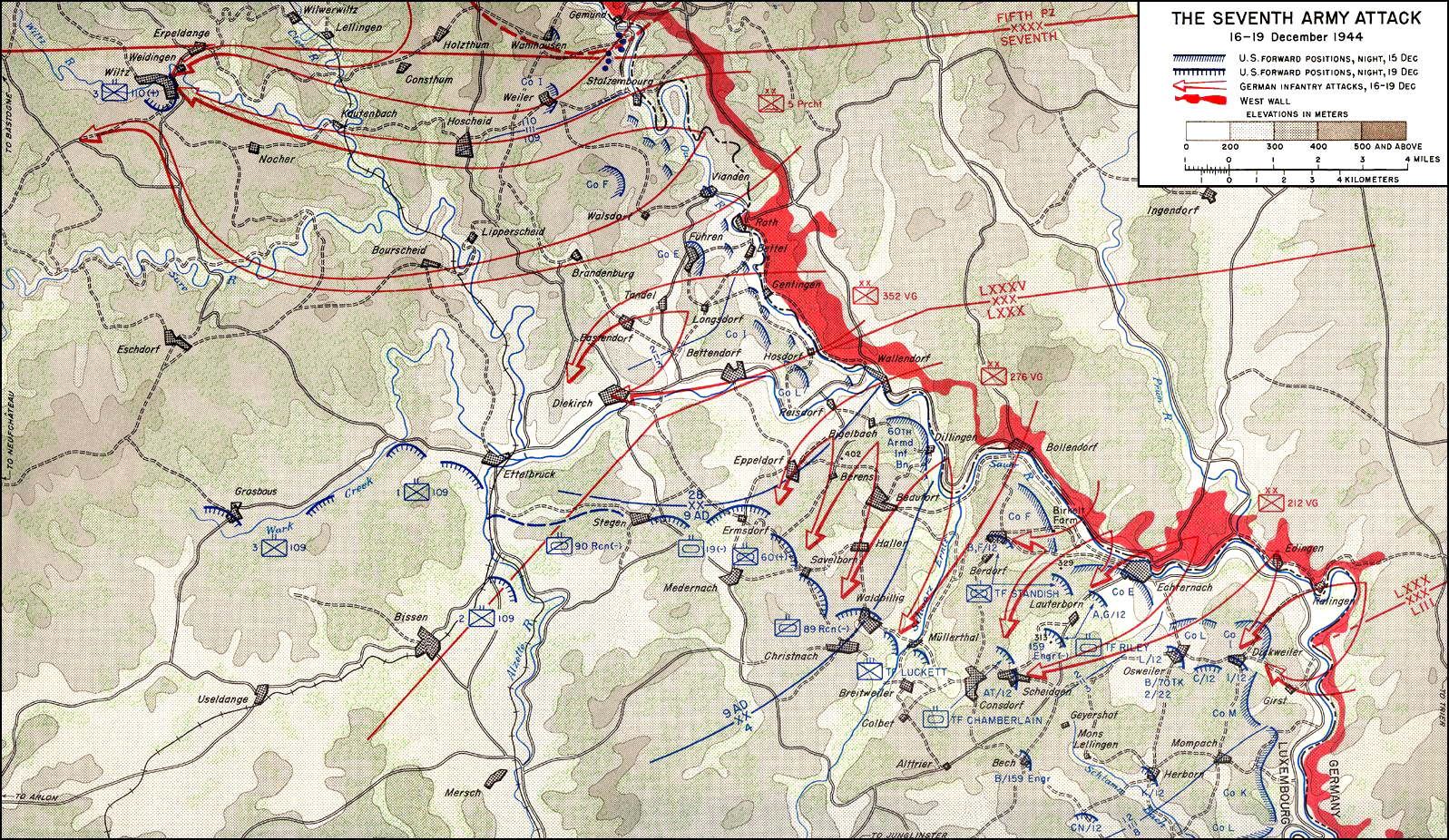
Southern sector of the battle where the 4th Infantry Division was situated.

Luxembourg was not a fortuitous site to relocate. Within a week of the battalion's arrival, the Germans began their last desperate counteroffensive into the Ardennes. The Battle of the Bulge began on 16 December, and the 70th Tank Battalion was located on the southern flank of the German penetration, with only eleven of its 54 medium tanks in operating condition. On 16 December 1944, elements of the battalion were sent forward with infantrymen of the 12th Infantry Regiment mounted on their tanks in order to reach elements of the regiment which had been overrun and isolated near Echternach, Berdorf, Lauterborn, Osweiler, and Dickweiler, in the northeastern part of Luxembourg. Until 24 December, platoon size detachments of tanks, supported by no more than five infantrymen mounted on each tank, operated as mobile strike forces to repel any German thrusts toward Luxembourg city. Thinly as the 70th Tank Battalion's operational tanks were spread, their presence, reinforced by combined arms task forces from the 9th and 10th Armored Divisions is credited with defeating superior numbers of German infantry.

The battalion had lost another 5 men killed, 14 wounded, and 4 missing in just a week in the Ardennes. After the unrelenting combat and movement since coming ashore at Utah Beach, the 70th Tank Battalion had nearly a month from Christmas Day 1944 until 21 January 1945 to rest and refit and bring the battalion back up to strength before it went back on the offensive.

=== End of war in Germany ===
In late January 1945 the 70th Tank Battalion was alerted that they would soon be on the move again. On 4 February, the battalion once again crossed into Germany to the west of Buchet. The battalion made steady progress eastward against sometimes spirited defense supporting the infantry regiments of the 4th Infantry Division to the outskirts of Prüm until ordered to go on the defensive on 12 February. Virtually out of contact with the enemy, the battalion used the time to train new replacements and catch up on administrative actions. On 1 March, the battalion went back on the offensive, supporting the infantry attack on Prüm. The break had given the Germans an opportunity to stiffen their defenses, and the battalion suffered 9 killed and 18 wounded in just two days of action. On 8–9 March, the battalion (minus Company C), participated in a raid as part of Task Force Rhino, and advanced 30 km northeast to the town of Reifferscheid—nearly half of the remaining distance to the Rhine River. Signaling that German defense was on the verge of collapsing, resistance was light, disorganized and dispirited, with over 1,500 prisoners taken by the task force in just over 24 hours.

After this successful deep penetration into German territory, the battalion unexpectedly received orders attaching them to the Seventh Army, far to the south in France, and to prepare for a long road march. The battalion covered 120 km on 12 March, and an additional 175 km on 13 March, closing on the town of St.-Jean-Rohrbach, France. Here, the battalion was attached to the 63rd Infantry Division, with the mission of assisting the division to breach the Siegfried Line—the third time for the 70th Tank Battalion. The battalion advanced as far as Ensheim (Saarbrücken) before they were relieved in place by the 740th Tank Battalion and reattached to the 4th Infantry Division on 18 March.

The battalion then withdrew back into bivouacs in the vicinity of Hochfelden, France, then beginning on 27 March moved in a series of road marches back into Germany, crossing the Rhine at Worms on 29–30 March. The next day the battalion was back in contact with the Germans, though the sporadic and ineffective nature of the combat indicated organized German military resistance had collapsed. The 70th advanced due east to Tauberbischofsheim on 30 March, then from there swung southeast. They took Rothenburg ob der Tauber on 18 April, and proceeded as quickly as possible with elements of the 4th Infantry Division along divergent routes to capture Ansbach and Crailsheim. The battalion suffered its last fatalities of World War II in Neuler on 22 April, but proceeded into Aalen by nightfall. They reached the Danube at Lauingen by 25 April, and proceeded through Wolfratshausen as far as Miesbach, some 15 km from the Austrian border before their combat mission was completed on 3 May. On 7 May 1945 the battalion road-marched to Ingolstadt briefly bivouacking there before moving to Rothenburg ob der Tauber on 18 May to take up occupation duties.

== Post World War II ==
The battalion was inactivated 1 June 1946 while still in Germany. Two months later, on 1 August 1946, the battalion was reactivated at Fort Knox, Kentucky.

The battalion served as part of the training cadre at the Armor Center and School at Fort Knox until it was alerted for combat deployment to Korea in July 1950.

== Korean War ==
=== Deployment, defensive, and offensive ===
At the outbreak of the Korean War in June 1950, the 70th Heavy Tank Battalion was still performing its duties as a support unit for the Armor School at Fort Knox. The 70th was alerted for movement to San Francisco on 8 July and began preparations for deployment to Korea. The unit was severely understrength, both in terms of personnel and equipment. Some 250 men had to be transferred to the unit from other units on Fort Knox, from Fort Campbell, Kentucky and Fort Meade, Maryland. Additionally, the tanks underwent intensive maintenance and refit, receiving new track, replacement parts and, where parts could not be obtained normally, were even removed from display vehicles around the base. Some relatively new M4A3E8 Sherman tanks were supplied from Rock Island Arsenal and eventually delivered to the battalion when they reached Korea. Tactical training was conducted primarily at the platoon level, but still totaled only about 30 days by the time the battalion deployed.

The 70th Tank Battalion embarked by rail on 17 July from Fort Knox, arriving at Camp Stoneman, California on 20 July. The battalion boarded the USNS General A. W. Brewster at Fort Mason, California on 23 July, with their vehicles and equipment loaded on separate cargo transport. With very brief port calls at Yokohama and Sasebo, Japan, the ship arrived at the port of Pusan, Korea on 7 August 1950. Their equipment transport did not arrive until 9 August. The battalion immediately set about unloading the tanks from the transport and reloading them on trains for Taegu. The 70th Heavy Tank Battalion was attached to the 1st Cavalry Division and elements of Company B first went into action near Waegwan, Korea on 15 August. Their appearance, along with the 6th and 72nd Tank Battalions, on the front was welcome by the American units which had had no tanks with which to fight the North Koreans' T-34's.

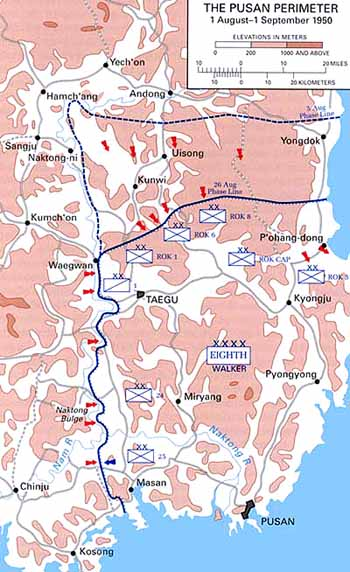
Map of the Pusan Perimeter, August 1950.

The battalion's employment with the 1st Cavalry Division closely mirrored their use during World War II. One tank company was attached to each cavalry (actually infantry) regiment of the 1st Cavalry Division, with platoons further divvied up one per battalion. Initial missions were route reconnaissance in order to become familiar with the terrain in anticipation of follow-on counterattack or withdrawal orders; and also show of force missions to discourage North Korean probes in the 1st Cavalry sector. Nevertheless, the 1st Cavalry Division was hard pressed by the North Koreans and had to withdraw from key terrain near Taegu between 4–9 September. Stabilizing the front over the next few days, the division and other units went on the offensive on 15 September in support of the Inchon Landings near Seoul.

As the American units began to break out of the Pusan Perimeter, they suffered numerous casualties to mines that the Koreans laid in their path of advance. In one incident, as Company A spearheaded the advance on the Taegu-Waegwan road, the unit lost nearly 75% of its tanks to mines in order to clear the road for the follow-on infantry. On 21 September, tanks of the 70th Tank Battalion continued to spearhead the 1st Cavalry's northward advance, at times outpacing both supporting infantry as well as their own supply line. Tanks of Company C led the advance of Task Force Lynch (after Lieutenant Colonel James H. Lynch), consisting of troops of 3rd Battalion 7th Cavalry Regiment and other units, in their drive toward the units breaking out from the Inchon landings. On 26 September, Task Force Lynch drove 106 miles before linking up at Chongji with elements of the 31st Infantry Regiment, 7th Infantry Division, one of the units which had landed at Inchon.

After several days of "mopping up" operations, the battalion moved on 4 October to the vicinity of Wijon-ni to prepare for crossing the Imjin River as American and United Nations troops continued to advance northward. They crossed the river on 7 October, and continued across the Yesong River on 12 October. Continuing to advance northward against sporadic resistance the battalion reached Pyongyang on 20 October. From Pyongyang, Company C and other battalion elements made contact with the 187th Regimental Combat Team, which had made an airborne drop in the vicinity of Sunchon. The 1st Cavalry Division and the 70th Tank Battalion continued to advance northward and reached Unsan, some 30 miles north of Pyongyang by 29 October.

=== Chinese Communist Forces intervention ===
On 31 October, Chinese forces counterattacked the American and UN forces in Korea. The 70th was heavily engaged in providing rear guard for the 1st Cavalry Division as they began to withdraw to the south. Fighting by platoon in support of each infantry battalion, units were frequently cut off, isolated and forced to fight through heavy Chinese forces, suffering heavy casualties in the process. Some platoons, especially those supporting the 8th Cavalry Regiment, were effectively annihilated. Initially, the units' priority was to exfiltrate back through the Chinese forces. By 9 November, the 1st Cavalry and the 70th Tank Battalion had reestablished their front line and defended their positions through 17 November. On 18 November, they conducted combat reconnaissance until the 1st Cavalry Division was placed in Army reserve on 21 November, where they remained until 28 November. On 28 November, the division was committed to the Eighth Army's right flank to prevent encirclement by the Chinese. From these positions along a line from Kunu-ri through Sunchon, the 1st Cavalry Division covered the withdrawal of the western sector of the Eighth Army. The division conducted an orderly withdrawal to near Uijongbu, just north of Seoul, by 12 December 1950. A new defensive line was established here and the 1st Cavalry Division, with its 70th Heavy Tank Battalion attachment, maintained these positions through the end of the year.

In early January 1951, the 70th Tank Battalion began preparations to move out of the line, and on 7 January 1951 moved into assembly areas in the vicinity of Singidong. Over the next two weeks the battalion conducted maintenance and repairs on vehicles and integrated and trained new replacements into the battalion. Anticipating a strong enemy attack in the vicinity of the 6th ROK Division, the 70th Tank Battalion formed the core of Task Force Johnson, which conducted a reconnaissance in force on 22 January to disrupt the communist forces preparations for the looming attack. The battalion supported the regiments of the 1st Cavalry Division in conducting combat reconnaissance missions through the remainder of the month.

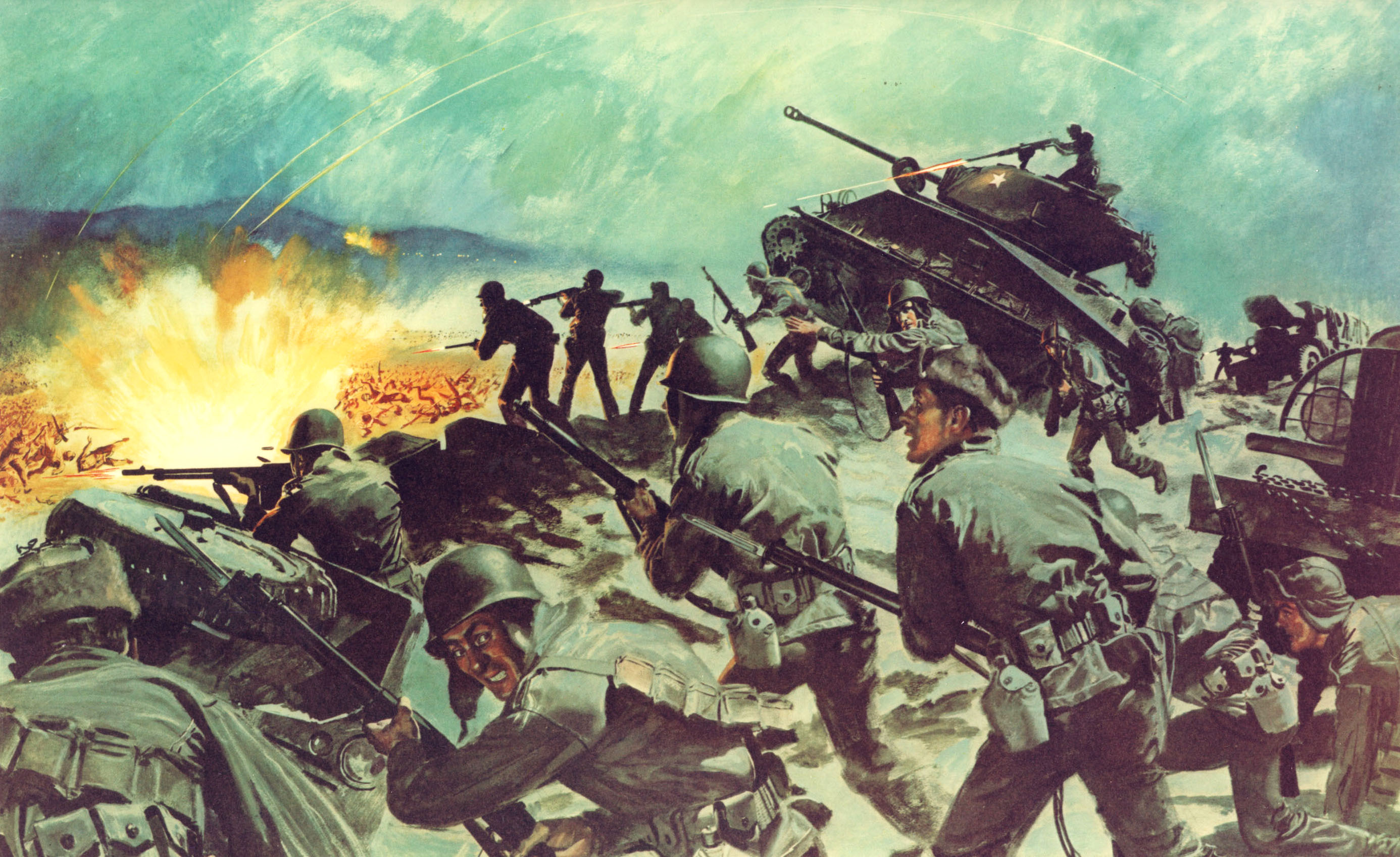
U.S. Army illustration of the Battle of Chipyong-ni.

In February 1951, the battalion supported the 1st Cavalry Division on the left flank of IX Corps in carrying out limited offensive operations northward from Kumyangjang-ni. On 15–16 February, Company A was attached to the 5th Cavalry Regiment to form Task Force Crombez in order to relieve the 23rd Infantry Regiment and a French Infantry Battalion which had been cut off by approximately six regiments of communist forces. In the heavy fighting that ensued, the infantry, who rode on the tanks during the advance, suffered numerous casualties, but the task forces succeeded in reaching the 23rd Infantry. The 2nd Platoon, Company A received the Presidential Unit Citation for their actions in relieving the 23rd Infantry. The battalion resumed aggressive patrolling in the 1st Cavalry Division sector into early April 1951, along with limited offensive objectives reaching Wonchang-ni.

By 11 April, warming weather, which began to thaw the ground, and flooding by the communists of the lowlands below the Hwacheon Reservoir, forced the 70th Heavy Tank Battalion into inactivity, and they were moved out of the line in order to conduct much-needed repairs and maintenance on their vehicles and to take on new replacement personnel. In Eighth Army reserve, the battalion was once again up to strength when communist forces resumed the offensive on 23 April 1951. By 25 April, the 1st Cavalry Division, with the 70th Heavy Tank Battalion still attached, was used to plug a gap in the Eighth Army line just north of Seoul when the 6th ROK Division collapsed, and to relieve the hard-pressed 27th British Commonwealth Brigade. Having thus stabilized the line, the battalion reverted to aggressive patrolling, often deep behind enemy lines. In late May 1951, the mission changed from combat patrols to direct support of the cavalry regiments as they advanced on an axis from Seoul to Uijongbu, thence north to the Imjin River in the vicinity of Cheorwon. Having reached these limited objectives, the emphasis again returned to combat patrols, primarily between Cheorwon and Tosan to the west. When the peace talks began between the communist forces and the United Nations Command, the 2nd Battalion, 7th Cavalry Regiment, and 4th Platoon, Company C, 70th Heavy Tank Battalion were selected to serve as the honor guard for the Peace Camp at Munsan-ni and were placed under direct Eighth Army control. The battalion briefly went into reserve on 29 July, but was back in the 1st Cavalry Division line in early August. The battalion continued combat reconnaissance patrols through September and briefly went on the offensive with the 1st Cavalry Division during Operation Commando in October 1951. Having attained their objectives, but with significant casualties, the division went on the defensive and the 70th Heavy Tank Battalion dug into their positions on the line. For the first time since early after their arrival in Korea, the 70th saw large numbers of communist tanks across their front, though they were consistently beaten off with concentrated tank and artillery fire, sometimes in conjunction also with close air support.

=== Relief from combat ===
On 21 November 1951, the battalion, less Company B (still in the line supporting the 8th Cavalry Regiment in combat), went into reserve and moved to a new assembly area. Upon closing on the assembly area, they learned they, along with the 1st Cavalry Division, were to be relieved by the 45th Infantry Division, and were to redeploy to Hokkaido, Japan. The 70th Heavy Tank Battalion was to be relieved by the 245th Tank Battalion, the organic tank battalion of the 45th Infantry Division. Company B was finally withdrawn from the line on 16 December. The battalion began transferring property to the 245th Tank Battalion on 7 December and the bulk of the battalion departed Korea by ship on 17 December. Company B departed on 28 December 1951. Upon arrival at Camp Chitose 2, in Hokkaido, the battalion began taking over the property of the 245th Tank Battalion.

The 70th Heavy Tank Battalion later moved from Camp Chitose 2 to Camp Fuji and remained in Japan until 15 October 1957, when it was inactivated and relieved of assignment to the 1st Cavalry Division.

== Reorganization and Cold War service ==
When the Army instituted the Combat Arms Regimental System (CARS) in the late 1950s, the 70th Tank Battalion was selected for conversion as the 70th Armor Regiment. The tank companies, where appropriate, supplied the lineage and heritage of the respective battalions of the 70th Armor Regiment. Throughout their individual histories, all the battalions of the 70th Armor Regiment were either stationed in Germany or were based in the United States with contingency plans to reinforce the forces in Germany in case of a crisis or actual conflict with the Soviet Union and its allies in the Warsaw Pact. As the perceived threat level in Europe waxed and waned, so battalions were activated or inactivated to counter the threat. Additionally, one battalion assigned to 24th Infantry Division during the 1980s was part of the Rapid Deployment Force designated for deployment to the Middle East in the event of a crisis there.

Initially, three battalions were activated in January 1963, equipped with M60 tanks, and all were assigned to the 24th Infantry Division in southern Germany. These battalions were:

1st Battalion, 70th Armor Regiment (1–70 Armor) – assigned to the 1st Brigade, 24th Infantry Division, Augsburg, Germany
2nd Battalion, 70th Armor Regiment (2–70 Armor) – assigned to the 2nd Brigade, 24th Infantry Division, Augsburg, Germany
3rd Battalion, 70th Armor Regiment (3–70 Armor) – assigned to the 3rd Brigade, 24th Infantry Division, Munich, Germany

1–70 Armor and 2–70 Armor were withdrawn from Germany along with their respective brigades of the 24th Infantry Division in late 1968 and stationed in Fort Riley, Kansas. However, by the end of 1970 the rest of the division, including 3–70 Armor, had also been withdrawn from Germany and all elements of the 70th Armor Regiment were inactivated at Fort Riley.

1–70 Armor was reactivated in 1975 as an element of the 4th Infantry Division when it activated a 4th Brigade at Fort Carson, Colorado. The brigade was selected to rotate to Germany during Exercise REFORGER in 1976 and dubbed "Brigade 76". Once deployed, the Brigade's assignment to Germany was made permanent and attached to the 8th Infantry Division. 1–70 Armor operated from Wiesbaden Air Base from 1976 until the brigade was inactivated in 1984.

1–70 Armor was reactivated when the 1st Battalion, 40th Armor Regiment (1–40 Armor), was reflagged as 1–70 Armor in 1988. The battalion was assigned to the 1st Brigade, 5th Infantry Division at Fort Polk, Louisiana. Although organized as a modernized "J-Series" battalion with four tank companies, the battalion was initially equipped with M60A1 tanks instead of M1 Abrams tanks. The battalion was inactivated with the rest of the division in November 1992.

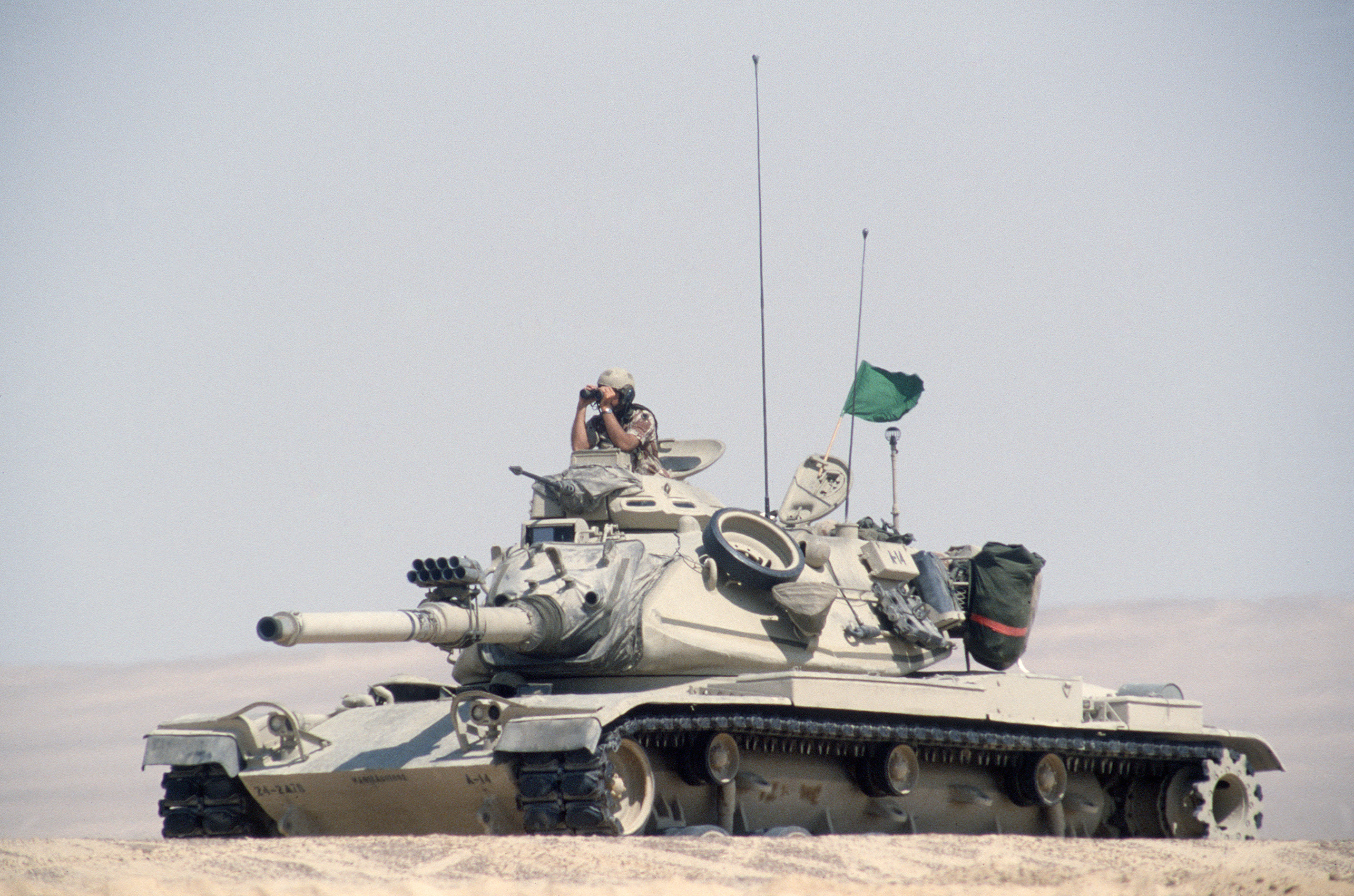
M60A3 Patton main battle tank from Company A, 2nd Battalion, 70th Armor, 24th Infantry Division, conducting gunnery practice during the multinational joint service Exercise BRIGHT STAR '85 in Egypt, August 1985.

2–70 Armor was reactivated and once again assigned to the 2nd Brigade, 24th Infantry Division at Fort Stewart, Georgia, in the summer of 1977 as part of the Army's Rapid Deployment Force (RDF), where it provided a significant portion of the RDF's heavy tank capability. In this role, the unit participated in various Southwest Asia operations and deployments, including to Cyprus and Egypt (Operation Bright Star). In 1986, not long before again being inactivated, 2–70 Armor modernized from M60A3's to M1A1 Abrams tanks under the Division 86 force structure. In order to facilitate unit realignment according to the U.S. Army Regimental System (USARS), on 15 October 1987, 2–70 Armor was inactivated at Fort Stewart. On 16 December 1987, the battalion was again activated and assigned to the 1st Armored Division, Erlangen, West Germany, where it remained until it deployed to Saudi Arabia in 1990.

3–70 Armor was activated in 1975 and assigned to the 2nd Brigade of the reactivated 5th Infantry Division at Fort Polk, Louisiana. The battalion was equipped with M60A1 tanks. They were reorganized as a modernized "J-Series" battalion, with four tank companies instead of three, in 1985, but the M60A1 series tanks were not replaced by M1 Abrams tanks until 1988.

In 1989, the Army reorganized its regimental system under the U.S. Army Regimental System (USARS) and the 70th Armor Regiment again saw units redesignated. Most of the battalions of the 70th Armor retained their prior designations and bases, but the reorganization saw the creation of a fourth battalion (4–70 Armor) for the first time. This expansion reflected the military buildup begun under the Reagan administration. All the battalions of the 70th Armor Regiment remained active until after the disbanding of the Warsaw Pact in February 1991 and the dissolution of the Soviet Union in December 1991. At the time of reorganization, the units were designated as follows:

1–70 Armor – 5th Infantry Division, Fort Polk, Louisiana
2–70 Armor – 1st Armored Division, Ferris Barracks, Erlangen, Germany
3–70 Armor – 5th Infantry Division, Fort Polk, Louisiana
4–70 Armor – formed from 2–81 Armor, Ferris Barracks, Erlangen, Germany, and assigned to 1st Armored Division, Germany.

== Operation Desert Shield/Desert Storm ==
After Saddam Hussein ordered Iraqi forces into Kuwait in August 1990, the 1st Armored Division was alerted for deployment from Germany to Saudi Arabia to participate in Operation Desert Shield. Assigned to the 2nd Brigade, 1st Armored Division, both 2–70 Armor and 4–70 Armor shipped their equipment by sea from Bremerhaven, with most personnel deployed in late December 1990. Collecting their equipment at the port of Dammam, the battalions deployed along the Saudi-Iraq border near Hafar al-Batin by mid-February 1991.

Both battalions crossed the border into Iraq when the ground campaign of Operation Desert Storm began on 24 February 1991 and participated in several sharp engagements. As part of the heaviest brigade in the war, consisting of three armor battalions and a mechanized infantry battalion, the two battalions were in the leading force of the 1st Armored Division. The brigade overran the major logistics center at Al Bussayah, then destroyed a brigade of the Adnan Republican Guards Division near the Ar Rumaylah airport. Finally, at the Battle of Medina Ridge, in what has been described as the largest tank battle of the war, the brigade led the division in attacking the Republican Guards Forces Command.

After Desert Storm, the 2nd Brigade, 1st Armored Division remained in southern Iraq to guard the Kuwaiti border through March 1991. Its battalions redeployed to Erlangen in April and May, with their equipment arriving over the summer.

On 16 August 1991, 2–70 Armor was reassigned to the 3rd Infantry Division, although it remained in Erlangen. As part of the "peace dividend" after the dissolution of the Soviet Union in December 1991, the battalion was inactivated on 15 December 1993 as U.S. forces in Germany were substantially reduced and the 3rd Infantry Division brought back from Germany. 2–70 Armor was later reactivated on 15 February 1996 at Ft. Riley, Kansas and assigned to the 3rd Brigade Combat Team, 1st Armored Division.

The 5th Infantry Division did not deploy to Southwest Asia for Desert Storm, nor did either of the 70th Armor battalions assigned to it. In the event the division was inactivated in November 1992. 3–70 Armor was inactivated with the rest of the division, while 1–70 Armor's colors were briefly transferred to Fort Knox, Kentucky as an element of the 194th Armored Brigade. While there, the battalion served as the vehicle for an Advanced Warfighter Exercise to test new digitized command and control equipment in a realistic operational environment. The battalion deployed to the National Training Center at Fort Irwin, California with the 24th Infantry Division in April 1994 to conduct the exercise, but 1–70 Armor was inactivated within the year when the 194th Armored Brigade was inactivated in 1995.

== Iraq ==
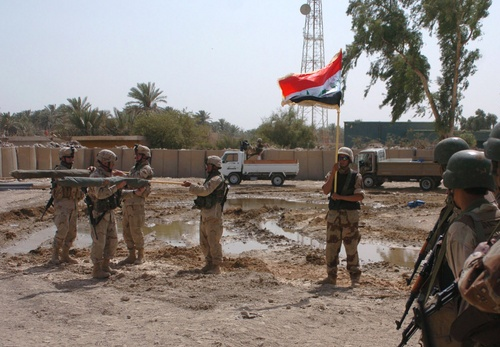
The battalion colors of 2nd Battalion, 70th Armor Regiment and 2nd Battalion, 14th Infantry Regiment, 2nd Brigade Combat Team, 10th Mountain Division, are cased during a transition of authority ceremony in the western Baghdad district of Abu Ghraib on 9 June 2005. Full command and control of the base was handed over to the 3rd Brigade, 6th Iraqi Army Division.

In preparation for U.S. forces invasion of Iraq, 2–70 Armor, having just completed a training deployment to the National Training Center, was alerted for deployment to Kuwait in January 2003. About three weeks later, the battalion deployed from Fort Riley and drew prepositioned equipment from a site located in Kuwait. The battalion was attached to the 3rd Infantry Division and was able to train with them for about a month before combat operations began. On 20 March 2003, 2–70 Armor marched into Iraq as part of Operation Iraqi Freedom, supporting the 3rd Infantry Division and the 101st Airborne Division (Air Assault).

During the invasion, 2–70 Armor was in the van of assaulting forces and cleared the route of march for follow on forces and on 21 March 2003, was the first American unit to seize a bridgehead across the Euphrates River. The battalion combined with 1st Battalion, 41st Infantry Regiment (1-41 Infantry) to attack Al Hillah, Iraq, effectively destroying an infantry battalion of the Nebuchadnezzar Republican Guards Division. After the first week, 2–70 Armor was cut to the 101st Air Assault Division west of Al Kifl, Iraq. With the 101st for the remainder of the maneuver phase of the war, 2–70th Armor continued to clear routes, secure areas and destroy enemy forces in the vicinity of Baghdad, and Karbala. During this phase of combat, the battalion once again learned the lessons of cooperating with dismounted infantry that had been learned in World War II and the Korean War. On 30 March 2003 2-70 Armor along with 1-41 Infantry were attached to 2nd Brigade, 82nd Airborne Division to clear the city of Samawah . At the conclusion of the maneuver phase, 2–70 Armor reverted to 1st Armored Division control and conducting stabilization operations until returning to Fort Riley in February 2004.

2–70 Armor deployed again to Iraq just a year later, in February 2005, with the 3rd Brigade Combat Team of the 1st Armored Division. The brigade was attached to the 3rd Infantry Division and assigned to the sector in and around Taji, north of Baghdad.

== Afghanistan ==
When the 2nd Brigade, 1st Armored Division was redesignated the 170th Infantry Brigade Combat Team, 4–70 Armor was reassigned to the new unit. Although recently returned from a rotation in Iraq, the 170th was selected for rotation to Afghanistan. In February 2011, 4–70 Armor deployed to Afghanistan, leaving their tanks behind. They were detailed to operate as part of Combined Team Urozgan in southern Afghanistan. While in Afghanistan, the unit was assigned the dual missions of continuing patrols in the vicinity of Tarin Kowt and Deh Rawod to disrupt the Taliban insurgency and to train Afghan National Police forces in order to assume responsibility for taking over security of the region. The battalion redeployed with the rest of the 170th Infantry Brigade to home station at Baumholder, Germany at the end of 2011.

In February 2012, the 170th Infantry Brigade was selected for withdrawal from Europe before the end of the year. The brigade headquarters and all the assigned units of the brigade, including 4–70 Armor, were inactivated on 9 October 2012 as part of the drawdown.

On 9 October 2014, the 2nd Battalion, 70th Armor was reactivated and became a Combined Arms Battalion in the 2nd Brigade, 1st Infantry Division at Fort Riley, Kansas.

On 20 June 2019, the 3rd Battalion, 41st Infantry Regiment was reflagged as the 4th Battalion, 70th Armor at a ceremony at Fort Bliss, Texas, becoming part of the 1st Armored Brigade Combat Team, 1st Armored Division.

== Unit awards and decorations ==
- Presidential Unit Citation, 6–28 June 1944, War Department General Order 85–44.
- Company D, Company C – Presidential Unit Citation, 16 November-4 December 1944, War Department General Order 37–46.
- Belgian Fourragère: 7–13 September 1944 and 16–21 December 1944, Department of the Army General Order 43–50.
- Occupation Credit, 2 May-27 December 1945, Germany.
- 2nd Platoon and 3rd Platoon, Company C – Presidential Unit Citation, 21–27 September 1950, Department of the Army General Order 35–50.
- 2nd Platoon, Company A – Presidential Unit Citation, 15 February 1951, Department of the Army General Order 38–52.
- Company C – Presidential Unit Citation, 3–12 October 1951, Department of the Army General Order 74–52.
- Republic of Korea Presidential Unit Citation: 16–26 August 1950, Department of the Army General Order 55–54.
- Bravery Gold Medal of Greece: during period of war, Korea, Department of the Army General Order 2–56.
- 2nd Battalion, 70th Armor – Valorous Unit Award, 26–28 February 1991, Department of the Army General Orders 12–94.
- 4th Battalion, 70th Armor – Valorous Unit Award, 26–28 February 1991, Department of the Army General Orders 27–94.
- 2nd Battalion, 70th Armor – Presidential Unit Citation, 19 March-1 May 2003, Department of the Army General Orders 2010–22.
- 2nd Battalion, 70th Armor – Valorous Unit Award, 1 September-30 November 2003, Department of the Army General Orders 2009–10 and 2009–14.

== Heraldry ==
=== Distinctive unit insignia ===
- Description: A green color metal and enamel device 1-1/8 (2.86 cm) inches in height overall consisting of the shield and motto of the coat of arms.
- Symbolism: The shield is green with five gold spearheads representing a platoon of five tanks entering into combat in a flying wedge formation.

=== Coat of arms ===
- Blazon:
  - Shield: Vert, five spearheads paleways in chevron Or.
  - Crest: On a wreath Or and Vert, supported by two lions rampant sable langued gules a Korean gateway of the last with doors closed of the third secured by a bar with two holders of the first.
  - Motto: Strike Swiftly
- Symbolism:
  - Shield: The shield is green with five gold spearheads representing a platoon of five tanks entering into combat in a flying wedge formation.
  - Crest: The two lions refer to the arms of Normandy and of Belgium, where the unit served with distinction in World War II. The closed and bolted Korean gateway commemorates the organization's action in repulsing the enemy's attempt to pass through the Pusan Perimeter at Taegu in the Korean War.

=== Lineage ===
Constituted 15 July 1940 in the Regular Army as the 70th Tank Battalion and activated at Fort George G. Meade, Maryland

Inactivated 1 June 1946 in Germany

Activated 1 August 1946 at Fort Knox, Kentucky

Reorganized and redesignated 14 June 1948 as the 70th Medium Tank Battalion

Reorganized and redesignated 31 December 1948 as the 70th Heavy Tank Battalion

Reorganized and redesignated 2 May 1950 as the 70th Tank Battalion

Assigned 10 November 1951 to the 1st Cavalry Division

Inactivated 15 October 1957 in Japan and relieved from assignment to the 1st Cavalry Division

Redesignated 25 January 1963 as the 70th Armor, a parent regiment under the Combat Arms Regimental System

Withdrawn 16 June 1989 from the Combat Arms Regimental System and reorganized under the United States Army Regimental System

== See also ==
- List of armored and cavalry regiments of the United States Army

== Notes ==
Footnotes

Citations
