= Jean Baptiste Eblé =

French army commander (1758–1812)

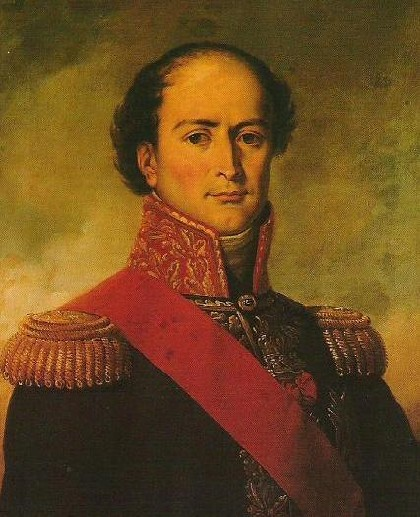
- General Jean Baptiste Eblé, portrait by Jean-Baptiste Paulin Guérin
- Born: 21 December 1758; Saint-Jean-Rohrbach, Moselle
- Died: 31 December 1812 (aged 54); Königsberg, East Prussia
- Military career
- Allegiance: Kingdom of France; Kingdom of France (1791–92); French First Republic; First French Empire
- Rank: Général
- Unit: Grande Armée
- Conflicts: Napoleonic Wars; Battle of Austerlitz; Invasion of Russia

Jean Baptiste Eblé (French pronunciation: [ʒɑ̃ batist ɛble]; 21 December 1758 – 31 December 1812) was a French General, Engineer and Artilleryman during the Napoleonic Wars. He is credited with saving Napoleon's Grand Army from complete destruction in the French Invasion of Russia by defying Napoleon's orders by keeping vital bridge building equipment intact for the river crossing in the Battle of Berezina.

== Biography ==
Eblé was born in Saint-Jean-Rohrbach, Moselle.

He, like his father, started out in the artillery when he joined the army in 1793. He was commissioned as an officer two years later. Rising rapidly through the ranks, he served in northern Germany, and commanded an artillery brigade at Austerlitz in 1805 before becoming governor of Magdeburg in 1806 and Minister of War for Westphalia in 1808.

The following year, he was assigned to Spain serving in the army of Marshal Masséna where he commanded the French artillery at Ciudad Rodrigo and Almeida.

In 1811, Eblé was put in command of the Dutch Pontoon bridge builders (pontonniers) for the Grande Armée which Napoleon was assembling for his invasion of Russia. Eblé discovered he had inherited a rag-tag collection of boatmen, yet in less than a year he had turned them into a disciplined, highly trained and skilled force who would soon prove indispensable. Besides training, Eblé also issued his pontonniers specialized tools and equipment, the most notable of which were the mobile wagon-mounted forges, that could quickly make any needed but unavailable metal parts or items.

During the disastrous retreat from Moscow in 1812, Napoleon ordered Eblé to destroy the pontonniers' mobile forges, so that these valuable pieces of engineering technology would not fall into enemy hands. Eblé argued with Napoleon, that without the forges his men could not perform their duty and the greater danger to the Armée was to be caught between an uncrossable river and a vengeful, pursuing enemy. Napoleon insisted they be destroyed, but Eblé wisely went against his orders and kept the vital equipment intact.

When the Armée arrived at the Berezina River it found itself trapped, with the Russians fast bearing down and no way to cross. Eblé's men worked feverishly in dangerously frigid water to complete the bridges in time for the Armée to escape. With the way across the Berezina opened, most of the surviving remnants successfully crossed.

Yet the campaign had taken a heavy toll on General Eblé's men and his health. He died in Königsberg shortly after returning from Russia, likely of the effects of the exposure of working in the icy Berezina. Napoleon, unaware of his death, had promoted him in 1813.

== References and links ==
- THE BRIDGES THAT ÉBLÉ BUILT: THE 1812 CROSSING OF THE BEREZINA
- Caulaincourt, Armand-Augustin-Louis de, Duc de Vicence, With Napoleon in Russia. Grosset & Dunlap, 1959
- Chandler, David, Dictionary of the Napoleonic Wars. London 1979
- Haythornthwaite, Philip, Who Was Who in the Napoleonic Wars, London, 1998.
- 1812: Napoleon's Fatal March on Moscow, Adam Zamoyski, ISBN 0-00-712375-2
