= Toppmannsbach =

River in Germany

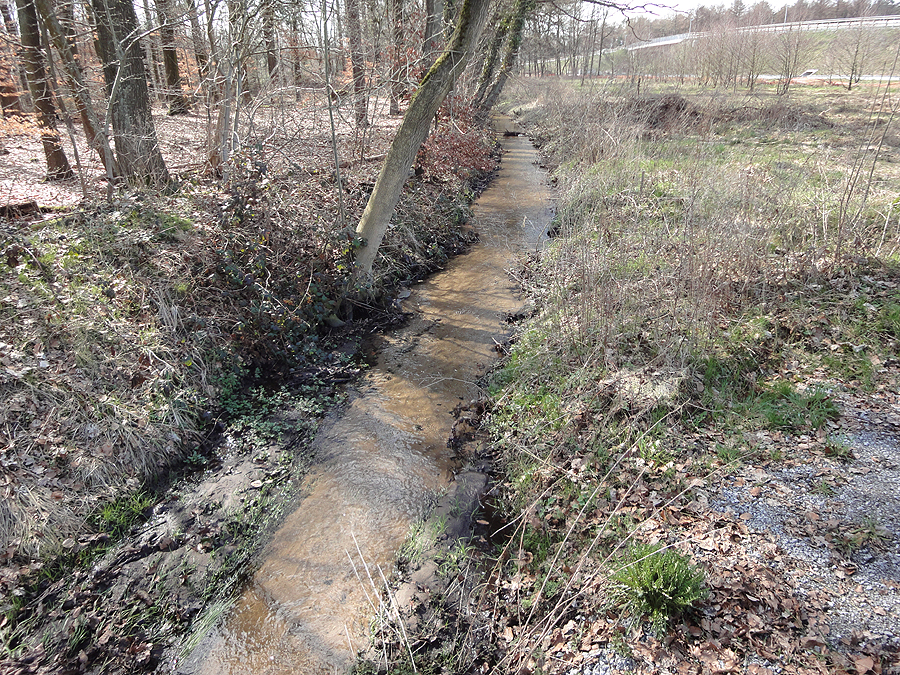

Location
- Country: Germany
- State: North Rhine-Westphalia

Physical characteristics
- Mouth
  - location: Reiherbach
  - coordinates: 51.9528°N 8.5008°E

Basin features
- Progression: Reiherbach→ Lutter→ Ems→ North Sea

Toppmannsbach is a small river of North Rhine-Westphalia, Germany. It flows into the Reiherbach in Bielefeld-Windflöte.

== See also ==
- List of rivers of North Rhine-Westphalia
