= Saint-Georges-de-Bohon =

- Part of Terre-et-Marais
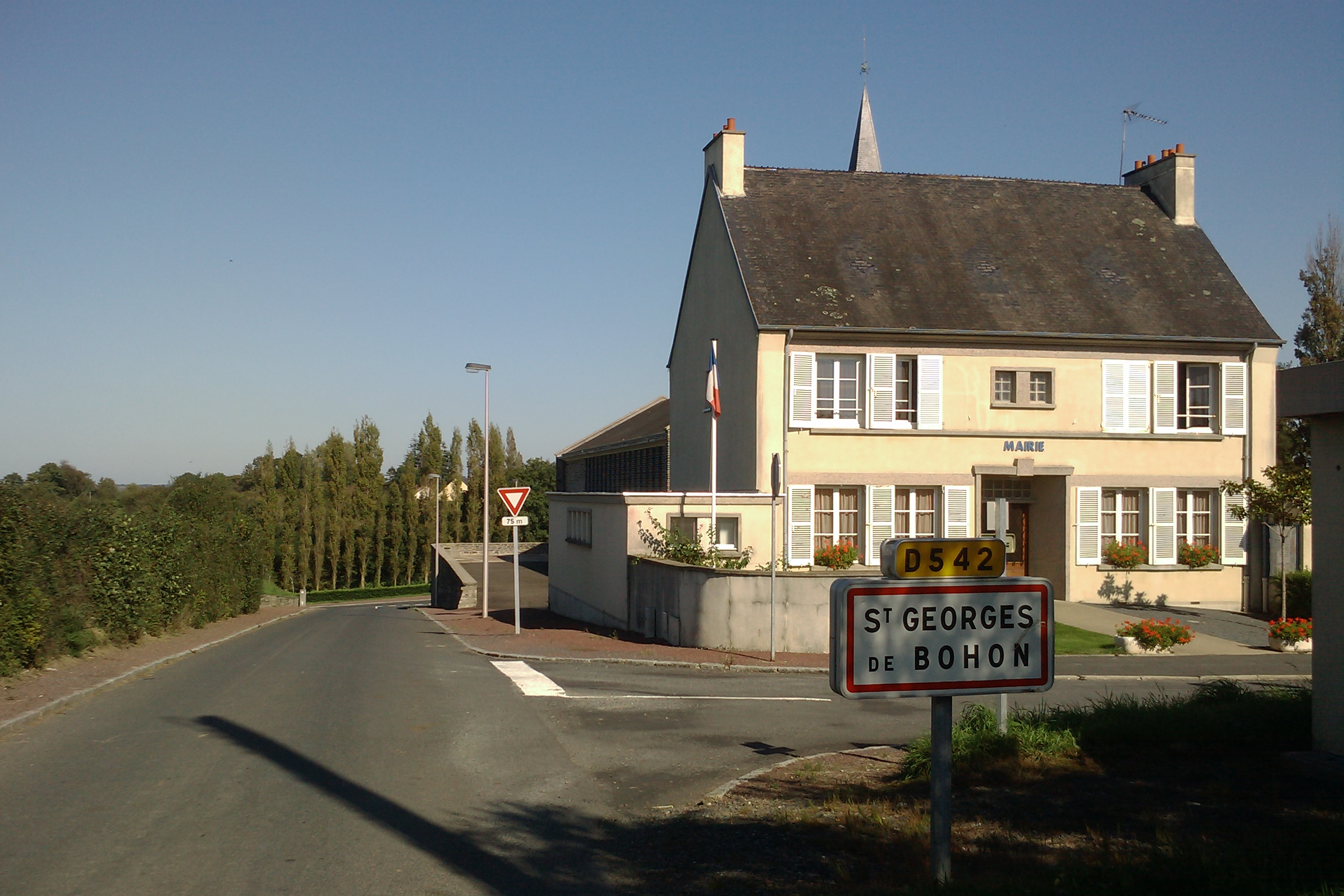
- Town hall
- Location of Saint-Georges-de-Bohon
- Location within France Location within Normandy
- Coordinates: 49°15′05″N 1°16′06″W
- Country: France
- Region: Normandy
- Department: Manche
- Arrondissement: Saint-Lô
- Canton: Carentan
- Commune: Terre-et-Marais
- Area^{1}: 13.96 km^{2} (5.39 sq mi)
- Elevation: 14 m (46 ft)
- Highest elevation: 25 m (82 ft)
- Lowest elevation: 0 m (0 ft)
- Population (2022): 411
  - Density: 29.4/km^{2} (76.3/sq mi)
- Time zone: UTC+01:00 (CET)
  - Summer (DST): UTC+02:00 (CEST)
- Postal code: 50500
- ^{1} French Land Register data, which excludes lakes, ponds, glaciers > 1 km^{2} (0.386 sq mi or 247 acres) and river estuaries.

Saint-Georges-de-Bohon (French pronunciation: [sɛ̃ ʒɔʁʒ də bɔɔ̃]) is a former commune in the Manche department in Normandy in north-western France. On 1 January 2016, it was merged into the new commune of Terre-et-Marais.

== See also ==
- Communes of the Manche department
