= Terre-et-Marais =

- Commune
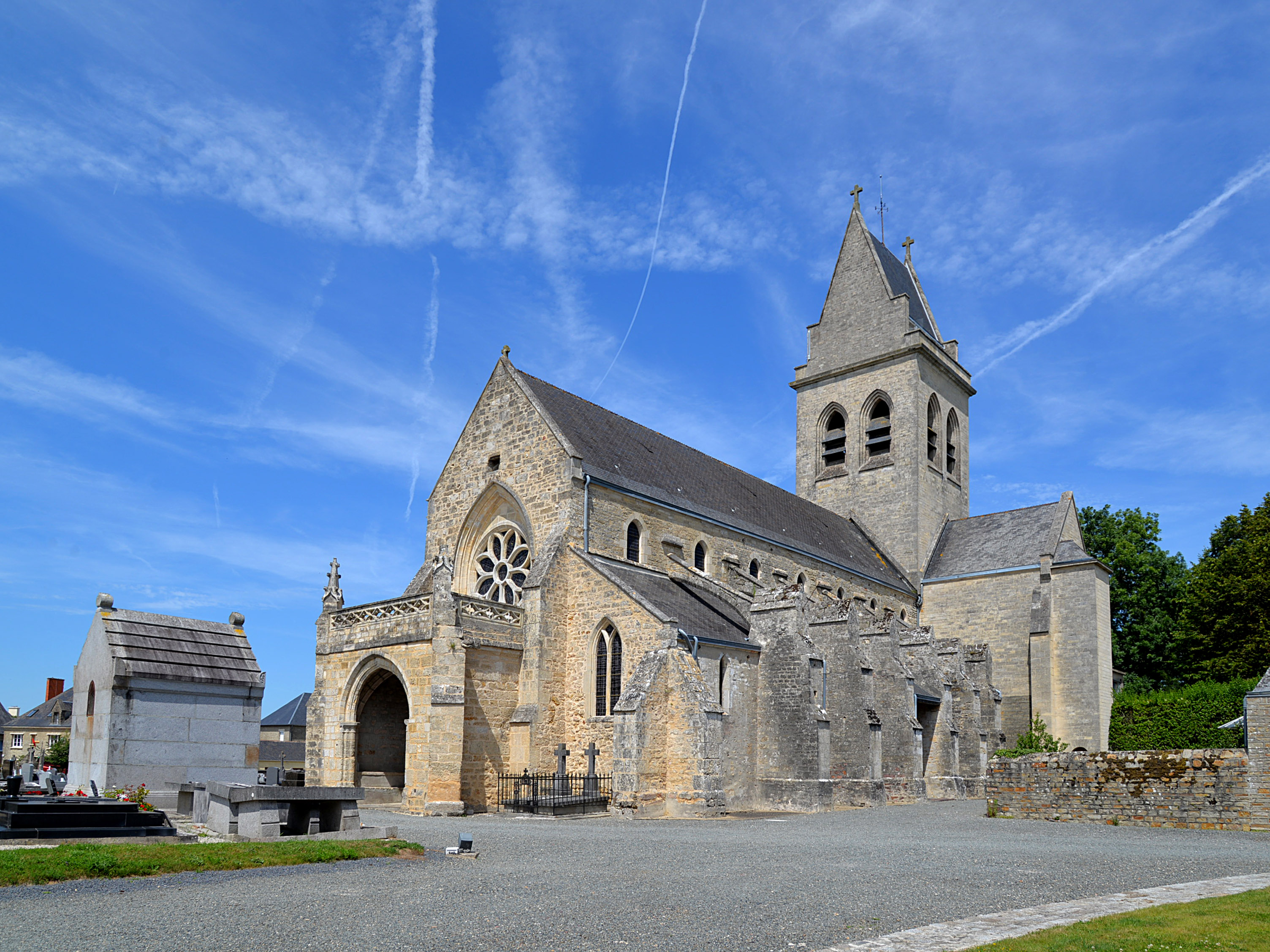
- The church in Sainteny
- Location of Terre-et-Marais
- Location within France Location within Normandy
- Coordinates: 49°14′20″N 1°18′50″W
- Country: France
- Region: Normandy
- Department: Manche
- Arrondissement: Saint-Lô
- Canton: Carentan-les-Marais
- Intercommunality: Baie du Cotentin

Government
  - Mayor (2020–2026): Jean-Pierre Jacquet
- Area^{1}: 35.59 km^{2} (13.74 sq mi)
- Population (2023): 1,271
  - Density: 35.71/km^{2} (92.49/sq mi)
- Time zone: UTC+01:00 (CET)
  - Summer (DST): UTC+02:00 (CEST)
- INSEE/Postal code: 50564 /50500
- ^{1} French Land Register data, which excludes lakes, ponds, glaciers > 1 km^{2} (0.386 sq mi or 247 acres) and river estuaries.

Terre-et-Marais (French pronunciation: [tɛʁ e maʁɛ], literally Land and Marsh) is a commune in the department of Manche, in northwestern France.

== Toponymy ==
The commune's name refers to the marshes of Carentan.

== History ==
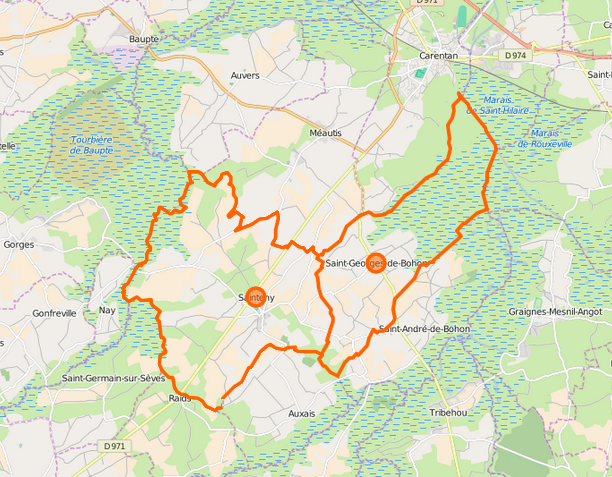
Map of the new municipality and its municipalities

The municipality was established on 1 January 2016, through the merger of the former communes of Sainteny (the seat) and Saint-Georges-de-Bohon. The communes of Saint-Georges-de-Bohon and Sainteny became delegated communes.

== Administration ==
Election	Mayor	Party	Occupation
2016	Alain Langlois	SE	Chief of construction, Delegate mayor of Saint-Georges-de-Bohon

== See also ==
- Communes of the Manche department
