= Röhrbach =

River in Germany

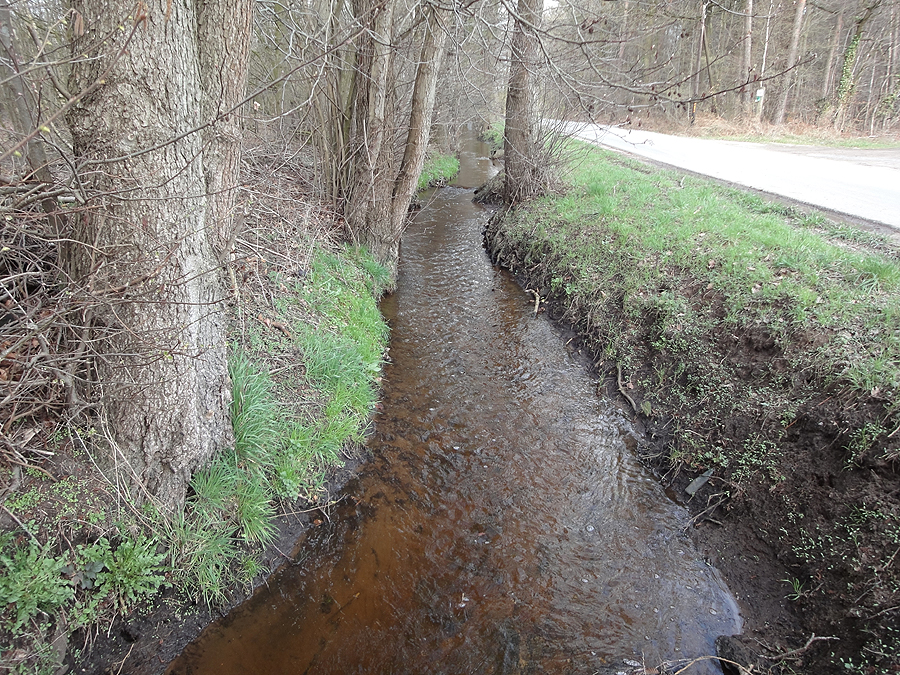

Location
- Country: Germany
- States: North Rhine-Westphalia

Physical characteristics
- Mouth
  - location: Reiherbach
  - coordinates: 51.9450°N 8.4483°E

Basin features
- Progression: Reiherbach→ Lutter→ Ems→ North Sea

Röhrbach is a small river of North Rhine-Westphalia, Germany. It is 5.8 km (3.6 mi) long and flows as a left tributary into the Reiherbach near Avenwedde.

== See also ==
- List of rivers of North Rhine-Westphalia
