= Sainteny =

- Part of Terre-et-Marais
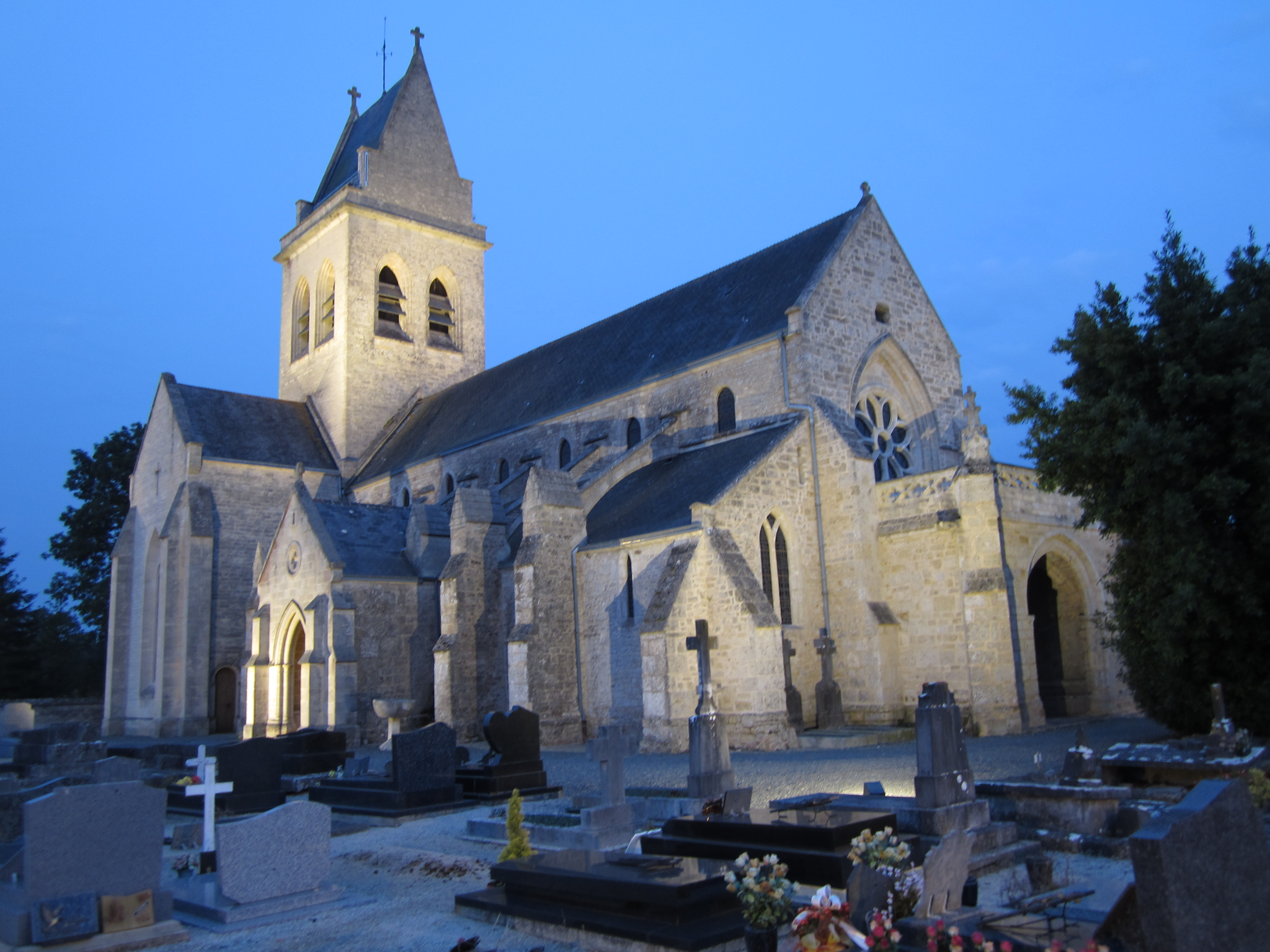
- The church of Saint-Pierre
- Location of Sainteny
- Location within France Location within Normandy
- Coordinates: 49°14′20″N 1°18′46″W
- Country: France
- Region: Normandy
- Department: Manche
- Arrondissement: Saint-Lô
- Canton: Carentan
- Commune: Terre-et-Marais
- Area^{1}: 21.63 km^{2} (8.35 sq mi)
- Elevation: 23 m (75 ft)
- Highest elevation: 26 m (85 ft)
- Lowest elevation: 2 m (6.6 ft)
- Population (2022): 877
  - Density: 40.5/km^{2} (105/sq mi)
- Time zone: UTC+01:00 (CET)
  - Summer (DST): UTC+02:00 (CEST)
- Postal code: 50500
- ^{1} French Land Register data, which excludes lakes, ponds, glaciers > 1 km^{2} (0.386 sq mi or 247 acres) and river estuaries.

Sainteny (French pronunciation: [sɛ̃tni]) is a former commune in the Manche department in Normandy in northwestern France. On 1 January 2016, it was merged into the new commune of Terre-et-Marais.

== See also ==
- Communes of the Manche department
