= Rohrbach-Berg =

Coordinates: 48°34′55″N 13°59′09″E

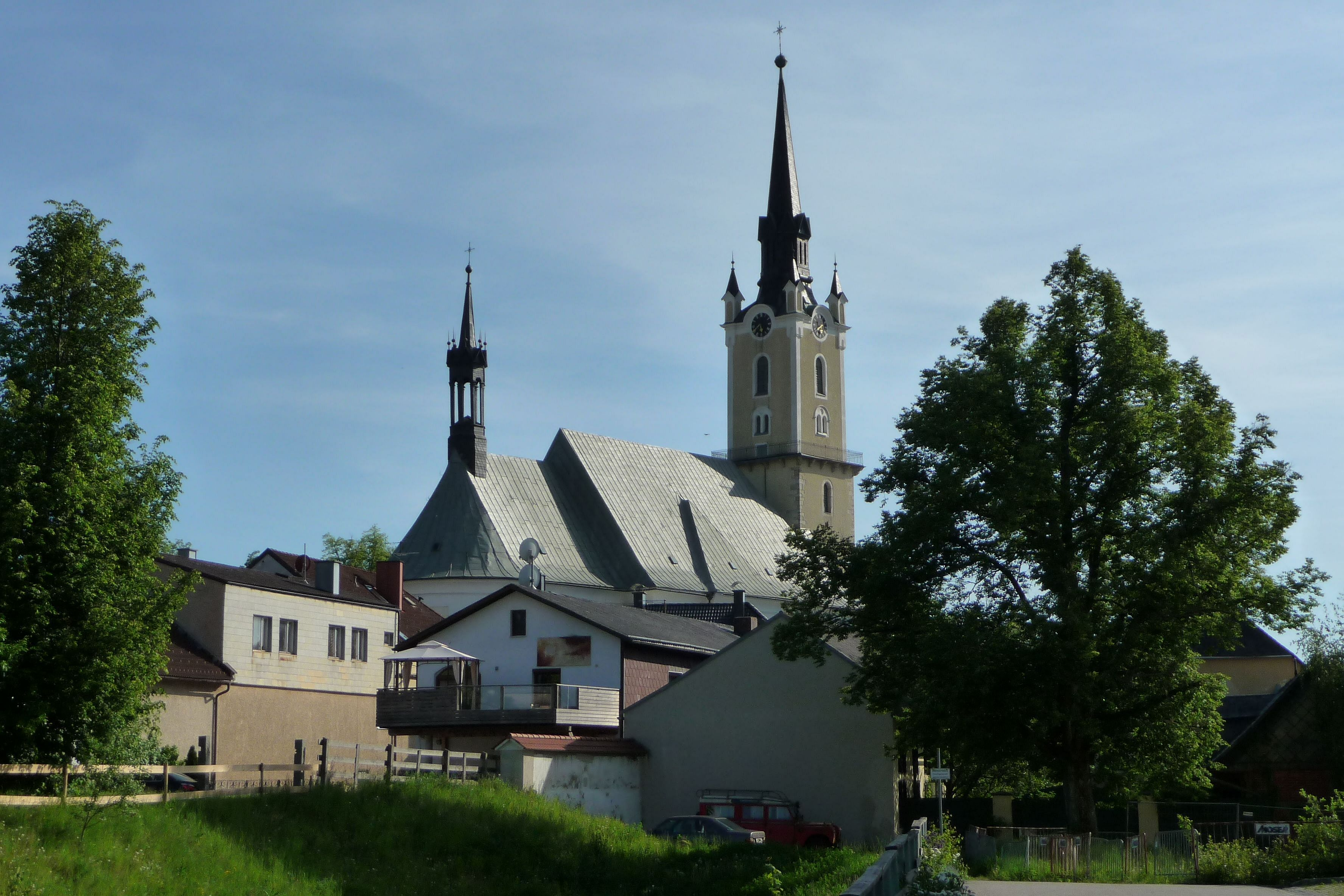
Parish Church in the village of Rohrbach

Rohrbach-Berg is a municipality in the Rohrbach District of Upper Austria. As of 1 January 2019, it had population of 5,183.

The municipality was formed on 1 May 2015 by merging two municipalities, Rohrbach in Oberösterreich and Berg bei Rohrbach. It is the seat of Rohrbach District, having taken it from Berg bei Rohrbach.

== Localities ==
The municipality includes the following populated places (Ortschaften), with population as of 1 January 2019:

- Arbesberg (53)
- Autengrub (14)
- Berg (956)
- Fraundorf (33)
- Frindorf (55)
- Fürling (143)
- Gattergaßling (28)
- Gierling (9)
- Gintersberg (8)
- Gollner (111)
- Grub (29)
- Harrau (34)
- Hauzenberg (20)
- Hehenberg (60)
- Hintring (28)
- Hundbrenning (76)
- Katzing (48)
- Keppling (57)
- Krien (38)
- Lanzerstorf (139)
- Märzing (52)
- Neundling (89)
- Nößlbach (91)
- Perwolfing (58)
- Reith (48)
- Rohrbach (2448)
- Scheiblberg (89)
- Schönberg (22)
- Sexling (206)
- Spielleiten (20)
- Steineck (54)
- Wandschaml (44)
