= Rohrbach in Oberösterreich =

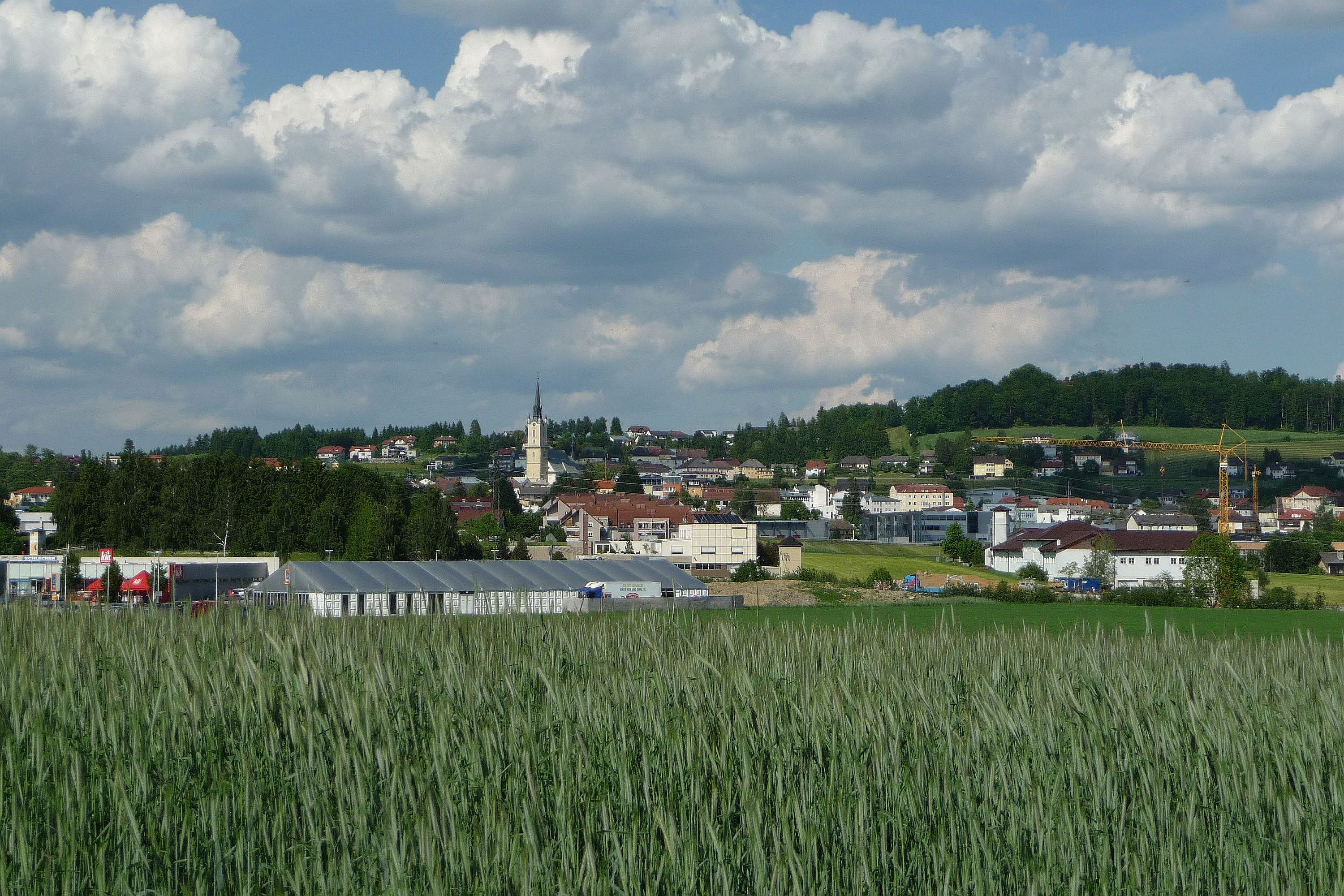

- Coat of arms

- Location within Austria
- Coordinates: 48°34′N 13°59′E
- Country: Austria
- State: Upper Austria
- District: Rohrbach

Area
  - Total: 7 km^{2} (2.7 sq mi)
- Elevation: 605 m (1,985 ft)

Population (14 June 2016)
  - Total: 2,530
  - Density: 360/km^{2} (940/sq mi)
- Time zone: UTC+1 (CET)
  - Summer (DST): UTC+2 (CEST)
- Postal code: 4150
- Website: http://www.rohrbach.at

Rohrbach in Oberösterreich was a town and capital of the district of Rohrbach in the Austrian state of Upper Austria. On May 1, 2015 Rohrbach was merged with neighboring community of Berg bei Rohrbach to the municipality Rohrbach-Berg.

== Population ==
Historical population
Year	Pop.	±%
1869	1,242	—
1880	1,217	−2.0%
1890	1,271	+4.4%
1900	1,416	+11.4%
1910	1,317	−7.0%
1923	1,206	−8.4%
1934	1,276	+5.8%
1939	1,273	−0.2%
1951	1,533	+20.4%
1961	1,667	+8.7%
1971	1,755	+5.3%
1981	1,874	+6.8%
1991	2,132	+13.8%
2001	2,353	+10.4%
2011	2,483	+5.5%
