= Sebastian Rohrbach =

German actor

Sebastian Rohrbach (born February 13, 1975, in Munich as Sebastian Valentin Tobias Johannes Edler von Koch auf Rohrbach) is a German actor. He worked under the name Sebastian von Koch until 2009.

== Filmography ==
- 2003: Kleinigkeiten, Direction: Christoph Englert
- 2005: SOKO 5113, Direction: Jörg Schneider
- 2005: Helen, Fred und Ted, Direction: Sherry Hormann
- 2005: Kurhotel Alpenschloß, Direction: Peter Sämann
- 2005: Die Rosenheim-Cops, Direction: Stefan Klisch
- 2006: Um Himmels Willen, Direction: Ulrich König
- 2007: Ich Chef, du nix, Direction: Yasemin Şamdereli
- 2007: Die Marco Rima Show, Direction: Dietmar Schuch
- 2007–2008: Zack! Comedy nach Maß, Direction: Joris Hermanns / Dietmar Schuch
- 2008: Man liebt sich immer zweimal, Direction: Holger Haase
- 2008: Gute Zeiten, schlechte Zeiten
- 2009: Inga Lindström – Zwei Ärzte und die Liebe, Direction: Peter Weissflog
- 2010: In jeder Beziehung (Pilot), Direction: Tommy Wosch
- 2010: Inga Lindström – Wilde Pferde auf Hillesund, Direction: Martin Gies
- 2011: Herzflimmern – Die Klinik am See, Direction: Renate Gosiewski, David Carreras
- 2012: In jeder Beziehung, Direction: Tommy Wosch
- 2012: Marcel über den Dächern (Cinema), Direction: Sebastian Stolz
