= Berg bei Rohrbach =

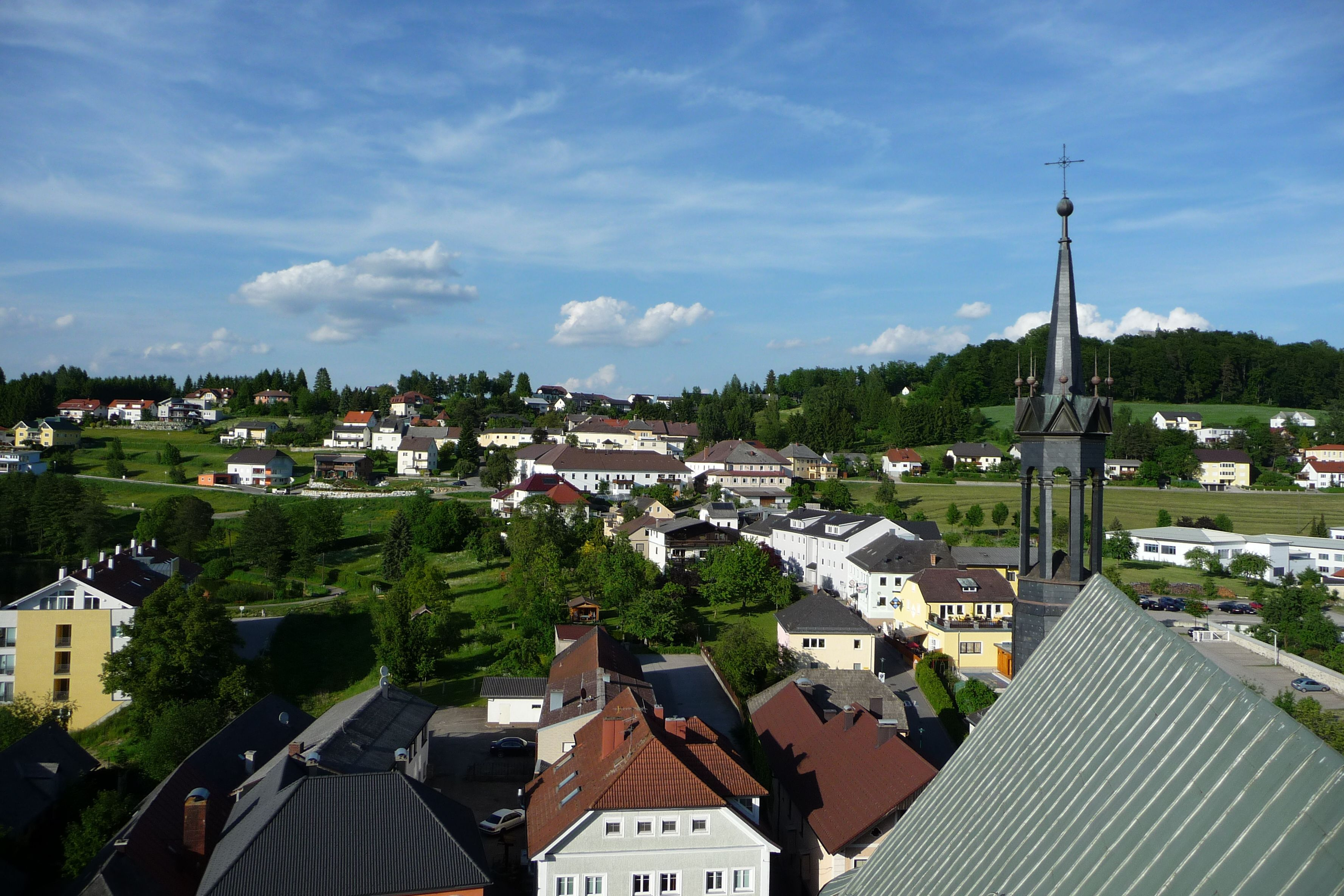

- Coat of arms

- Location within Austria
- Coordinates: 48°34′29″N 14°00′07″E
- Country: Austria
- State: Upper Austria
- District: Rohrbach

Area
  - Total: 31 km^{2} (12 sq mi)
- Elevation: 630 m (2,070 ft)

Population (14 June 2016)
  - Total: 2,518
  - Density: 81/km^{2} (210/sq mi)
- Time zone: UTC+1 (CET)
  - Summer (DST): UTC+2 (CEST)
- Postal code: 4150
- Area code: 07289
- Vehicle registration: RO

Berg bei Rohrbach was a municipality in the district of Rohrbach in the Austrian state of Upper Austria. On May 1, 2015, Berg bei Rohrbach was merged with neighboring communities of Rohrbach in Oberösterreich to the municipality Rohrbach-Berg.

== Geography ==
Berg bei Rohrbach was lying in the upper Mühlviertel. About 31 percent of the municipality is forest, and 62 percent is farmland.
