= Reiherbach (Lutter) =

River in Germany

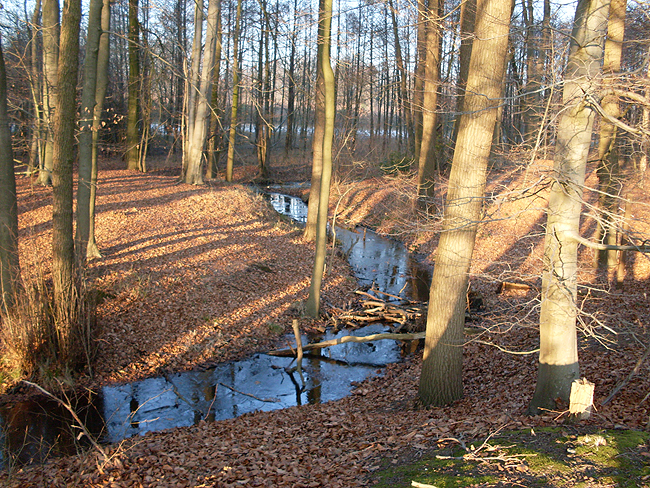

Location
- Country: Germany
- State: North Rhine-Westphalia

Physical characteristics
- Source
  - coordinates: 51°57′38″N 8°32′30″E
- Mouth
  - location: Lutter
  - coordinates: 51.9458°N 8.4149°E
- Length: 10.9 km (6.8 mi)

Basin features
- Progression: Lutter→ Ems→ North Sea

Reiherbach is a river of North Rhine-Westphalia, Germany. It is a left tributary of the Lutter near Gütersloh.

== See also ==
- List of rivers of North Rhine-Westphalia
