= Saint-Jean-Rohrbach =

- Commune
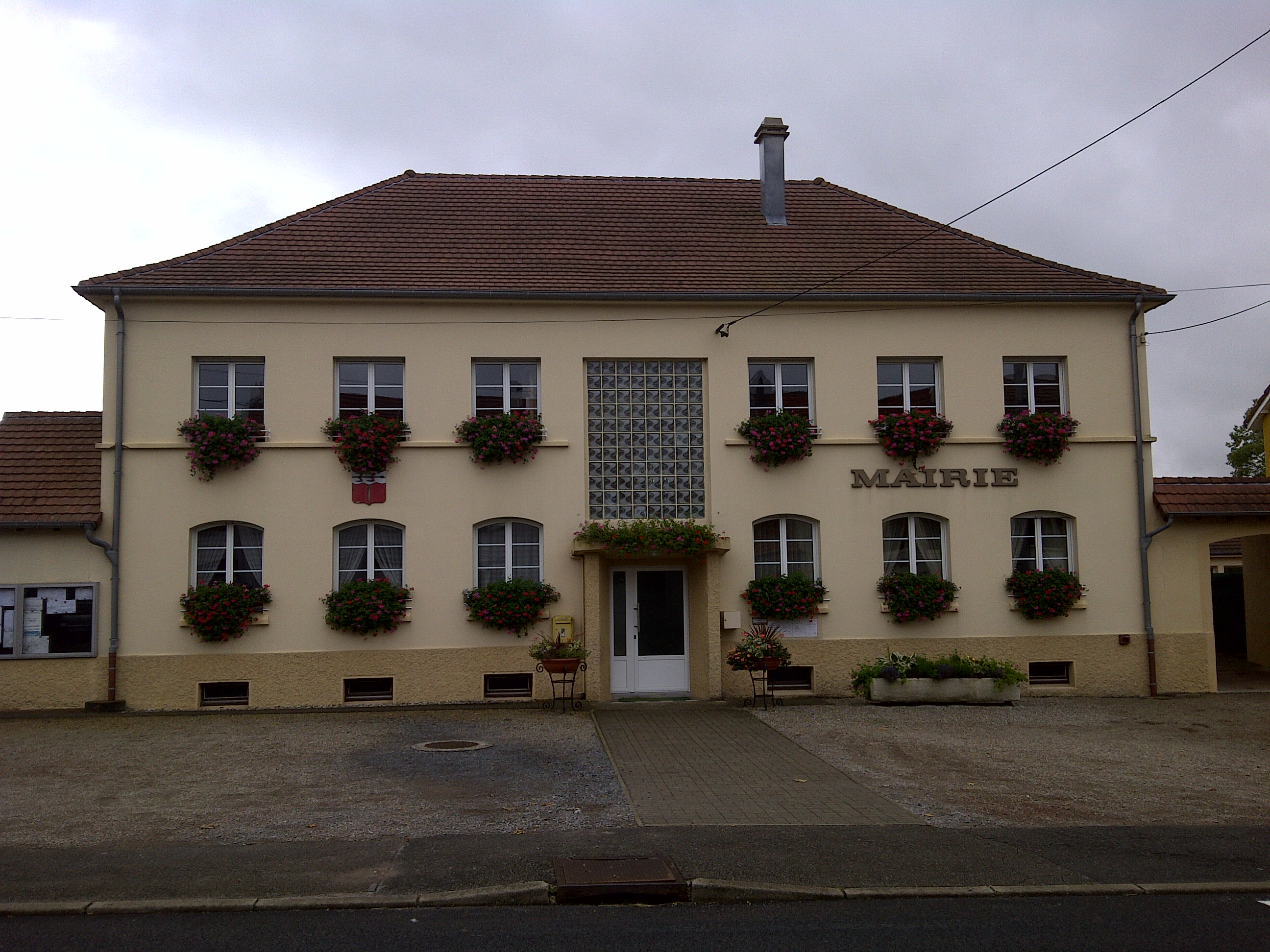
- The town hall in Saint-Jean-Rohrbach

- Coat of arms
- Location of Saint-Jean-Rohrbach
- Location within France Location within Grand Est
- Coordinates: 49°01′33″N 6°53′01″E
- Country: France
- Region: Grand Est
- Department: Moselle
- Arrondissement: Sarreguemines
- Canton: Sarralbe
- Intercommunality: CA Sarreguemines Confluences

Government
  - Mayor (2020–2026): Cyrille Fetique
- Area^{1}: 12.19 km^{2} (4.71 sq mi)
- Elevation: 235 m (771 ft)
- Highest elevation: 271 m (889 ft)
- Lowest elevation: 219 m (719 ft)
- Population (2023): 960
  - Density: 79/km^{2} (200/sq mi)
- Time zone: UTC+01:00 (CET)
  - Summer (DST): UTC+02:00 (CEST)
- INSEE/Postal code: 57615 /57510
- ^{1} French Land Register data, which excludes lakes, ponds, glaciers > 1 km^{2} (0.386 sq mi or 247 acres) and river estuaries.

Saint-Jean-Rohrbach (French pronunciation: [sɛ̃ ʒɑ̃ ʁɔʁbak]; German: Johannsrohrbach) is a commune in the Moselle department in Grand Est in north-eastern France.

== See also ==
- Communes of the Moselle department
