= Birkbeck =

Birkbeck may refer to:

- Birkbeck (surname)
- Birkbeck, University of London, a member institution of the University of London
- Birkbeck Students' Union, a Student Union in London
- Birkbeck station, a railway station and tram stop in south London
- Birkbeck Stratford, the name for a project to expand the provision of part-time Higher Education in east London.
- Birkbeck Court, the oldest and largest student residence at the University of Strathclyde, Scotland.
- Birkbeck, Illinois, an unincorporated community in DeWitt County, Illinois, United States.
