= Birkbeck (surname) =

Birkbeck is a Northern English surname. Notable people with the surname include:

- Edward Birkbeck (1838–1907), Conservative Party politician in the United Kingdom
- Elena Birkbeck (1840–1897), first wife of William Knox D'Arcy, mining entrepreneur
- George Birkbeck (1776–1841), doctor, academic, philanthropist and pioneer in adult education, founder of Birkbeck, University of London
- John Birkbeck (1817–1890), Yorkshireman, banker, alpinist, and pioneer potholer
- Mike Birkbeck (born 1961), former baseball player
- Morris Birkbeck (1764–1825), early 19th century Illinois pioneer and publicist.
- Raynes Birkbeck (1956-), American visual artist
- Captain Robert Alexander Birkbeck, DFC, British World War I flying ace
- Simon Birckbek or Birkbeck (1584–1656), English clergyman and controversialist
- The Birkbeck Twins, collective professional name of artists Daniel (Dan) and Thomas (Tom) Birkbeck, best known for portraits of cue sports figures such as Willie Mosconi and Rudolph "Minnesota Fats" Wanderone
