= Raynes Birkbeck =

American visual artist (born 1956)

- Born: 1956 (age 68–69); The Bronx, New York, U.S.
- Education: Self-taught
- Known for: Painting; sculpture; drawing; poetry

Raynes Birkbeck (born 1956) is an American artist who lives and works in Manhattan. Birkbeck is a self-taught artist who paints, sculpts, draws, and writes poetry.

== Life and work ==
Birkbeck was born in The Bronx, NY.

He has exhibited work at the Bureau of General Services—Queer Division, New York, Situations, New York; and Safe Gallery, Brooklyn.

Willow Glen Films is producing a documentary on Raynes, in conjunction with his exhibition at Nino Mier Gallery, LA.
