= Birkbeck Stratford =

Birkbeck Stratford is the name for a project to expand the provision of part-time Higher Education in east London, made by Birkbeck, University of London in conjunction with the University of East London. The project was part-financed by a £5 million grant from the Higher Education Funding Council for England and the collaboration was formally launched on November 21, 2006.

Initially, space was rented as well as utilising the University of East London Stratford Campus, but the long-term goal of constructing a dedicated facility in Stratford was realised when the new campus officially opened in November 2013.
