= Birkbeck, University of London =

Public university in England

Coordinates: 51°31′19″N 0°07′49″W

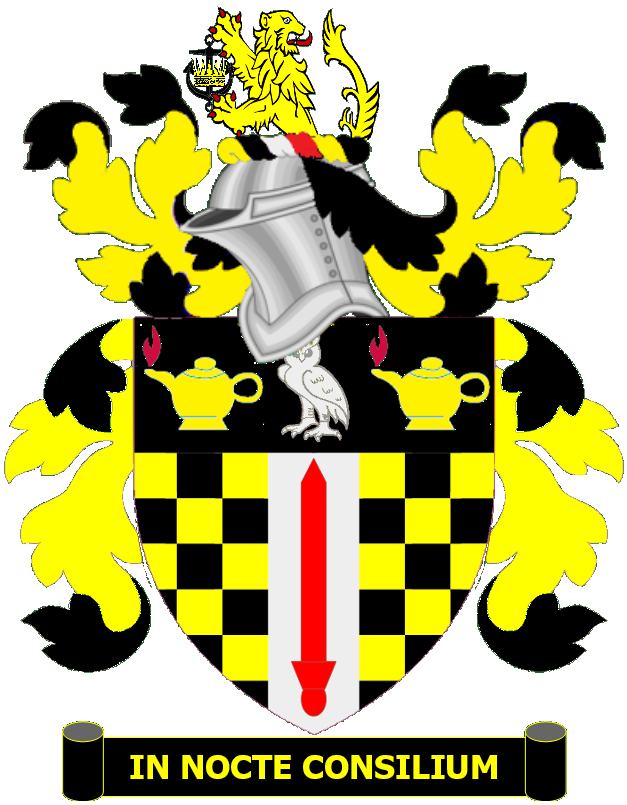
- Coat of arms
- Motto: Latin: In nocte consilium
- Motto in English: Advice comes at night
- Type: Public research university
- Established: 1823; 203 years ago (as London Mechanics' Institute); 1866; 160 years ago (as Birkbeck Literary and Scientific Institution); 1907; 119 years ago (as Birkbeck College)
- Parent institution: University of London
- Affiliations: ACU; European University Association; Royal Academy of Dramatic Art; Universities UK
- Endowment: £10.2 million (2022)
- Budget: £108.2 million (2021–22)
- Chancellor: The Princess Royal (University of London)
- President: Shami Chakrabarti
- Vice-Chancellor: Sally Wheeler
- Students: 7,720 (2024/25)
- Undergraduates: 4,495 (2024/25)
- Postgraduates: 3,225 (2024/25)
- Location: London, England, United Kingdom
Colours
- Website: bbk.ac.uk

Birkbeck College, University of London (officially branded as Birkbeck, University of London) is a public research university located in the Bloomsbury district of London, England. It is a member institution of the University of London. Established in 1823 as the London Mechanics' Institute by its founder Joseph Clinton Robertson and its supporters George Birkbeck, Jeremy Bentham, J. C. Hobhouse and Henry Brougham, Birkbeck is one of the few universities to specialise in evening higher education in the United Kingdom.

Birkbeck's main building is in Bloomsbury, in the London Borough of Camden in Central London. Birkbeck offers more than 200 undergraduate and postgraduate programmes. Birkbeck's academic activities are organised into five constituent faculties, which are subdivided into nineteen departments. The university is a member of academic organisations such as the Association of Commonwealth Universities and the European University Association. The university is also a member of the Screen Studies Group, London. The university's Centre for Brain Function and Development was awarded The Queen's Anniversary Prize for its brain research in 2005.

Birkbeck's alumni and former and current staff include five Nobel laureates, numerous political leaders, members of the Parliament of the United Kingdom and a British prime minister.

== History ==
=== Founding ===
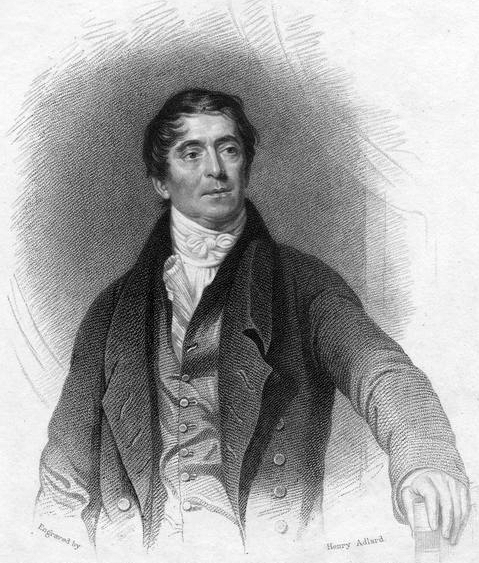
Dr. George Birkbeck, founder of Birkbeck, University of London

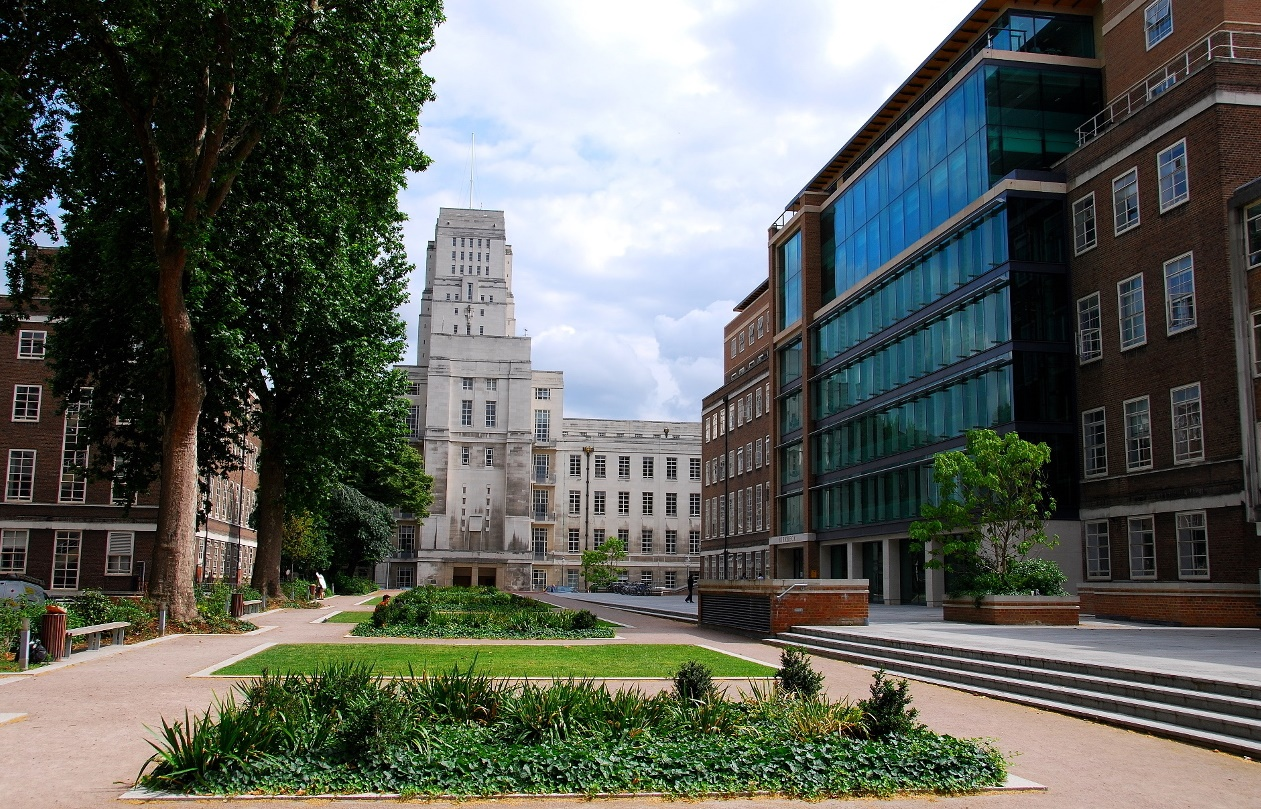
Part of the main Birkbeck campus in Bloomsbury, showing the main entrance (on the right).

In the 11 October 1823 issue of Mechanic's Magazine, a new weekly serial by JC Robertson and Thomas Hodgskin, the editors with influence from Francis Place proposed a London Mechanics' Institute. Their proposal referenced the work of Dr. George Birkbeck, a graduate of the University of Edinburgh and pioneer of adult education. Birkbeck soon became central to the project and, on 11 November 1823, chaired its founding meeting at the Crown and Anchor Tavern in the Strand before a crowd of two thousand people. The Institute was not universally popular, with some accusing Birkbeck of "scattering the seeds of evil", yet Birkbeck fully devoted his efforts to the college as its founder and first president.

The Institute moved into the Southampton Buildings on Chancery Lane in 1825. In 1830, it became one of the earliest colleges to admit female students. Changes to the University of London's structure in 1858 allowed the Institute's students to sit examinations for its degrees. The Institute became the main provider for part-time university education.

In 1866, the Institute changed its name to the Birkbeck Literary and Scientific Institution. In 1885 Birkbeck moved to the Breams Building on Fetter Lane, where it remained for the next 67 years.

=== Birkbeck College ===
In 1907, Birkbeck's name was shortened to Birkbeck College. In 1913 a review of the University of London, which had been restructured in 1900, recommended that Birkbeck become a constituent college of the University, but the outbreak of the First World War delayed this until 1920. The Royal Charter was granted in 1926.

In 1921, the college's first female professor, Dame Helen Gwynne-Vaughan, began teaching botany. Other distinguished faculty in the years between the two world wars included Nikolaus Pevsner, J. D. Bernal and Cyril Joad.

During the Second World War Birkbeck was the only central University of London college not to be relocated outside the capital. In 1941 the college's library suffered a direct hit during The Blitz, but teaching continued. During the war the college organised lunch-time extramural lectures for the public, given by, among others, Joad, Pevsner and Harold Nicolson.

In 1952, the college moved to its present location in Malet Street.

=== Current status ===
In 2002, the college was rebranded Birkbeck, University of London, although Birkbeck College, University of London remains its full legal name. In 2003, following a major redevelopment, its building in Malet Street was reopened by the Chancellor of the University of London, The Princess Royal.

In 2006, Birkbeck announced that it had been granted five million pounds by the Higher Education Funding Council for England to expand its provision into East London, working with the University of East London. The partnership, which was launched on 21 November 2006, is called Birkbeck Stratford.

Birkbeck is the largest college of the University of London not to award its own degrees. Although it has held its own degree-awarding powers since 2012, Birkbeck has chosen to hold these in reserve, preferring to award University of London degrees. It also offers many continuing education courses leading to certificates and diplomas, foundation degrees, and short courses.

In late October 2022, the University and College Union published a press release in which it stated that Birkbeck was planning to significantly reduce its staff because of a multi-million-pound deficit, in a restructuring that could lead to compulsory redundancies. In the same release it was stated that the local UCU branch had passed a motion of no confidence in the senior leadership team. Protests against possible job cuts took place at Birkbeck in November 2022.

In 2022, Birkbeck, a history of the college, was published by Oxford University Press to mark the 200th anniversary of its foundation.

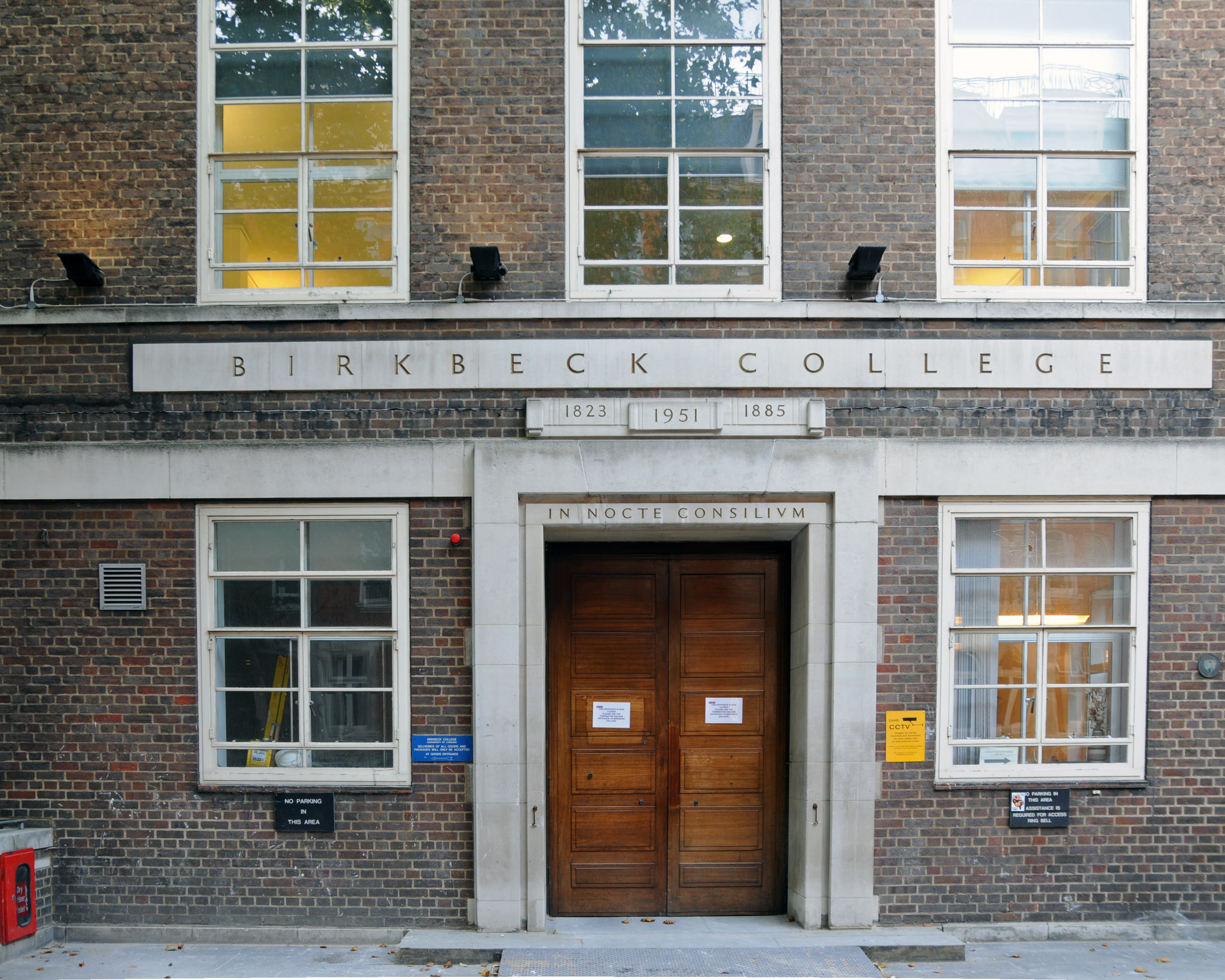
The former main entrance of Birkbeck College; the new entrance is on the other side of this building.

=== The School of Continuing Education ===
In 1876, the London Society for the Extension of University Education was founded with the aim of encouraging working people to undertake higher education. In 1903, it became the Department of Extra-Mural Studies of the University of London, and in 1988, was integrated into Birkbeck, first as the Centre for Extramural Studies and then as the School of Continuing Education. In 2009, the Faculty of Lifelong Learning was incorporated into the main college structure.

== Campus and location ==
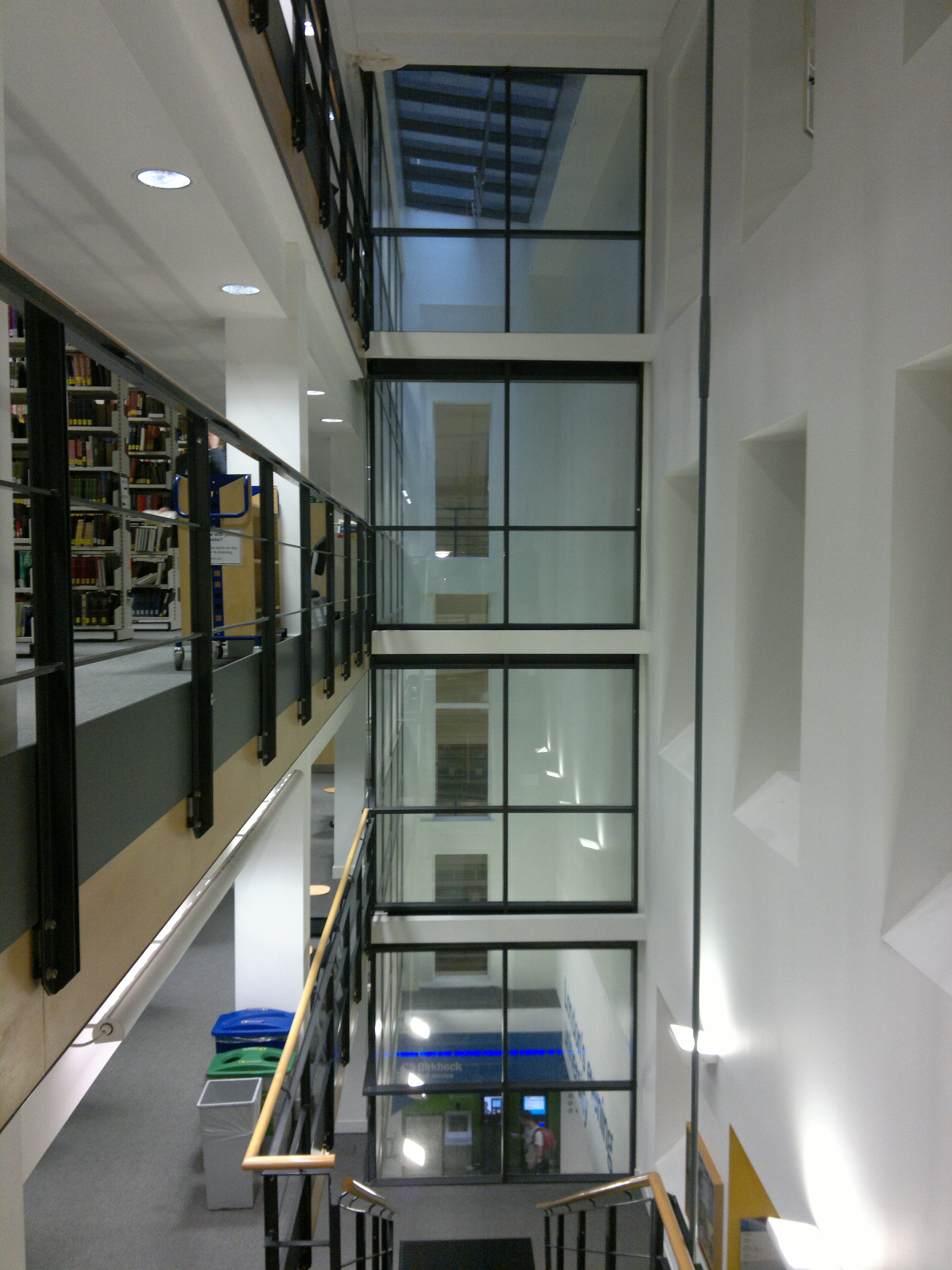
The interior of the new library

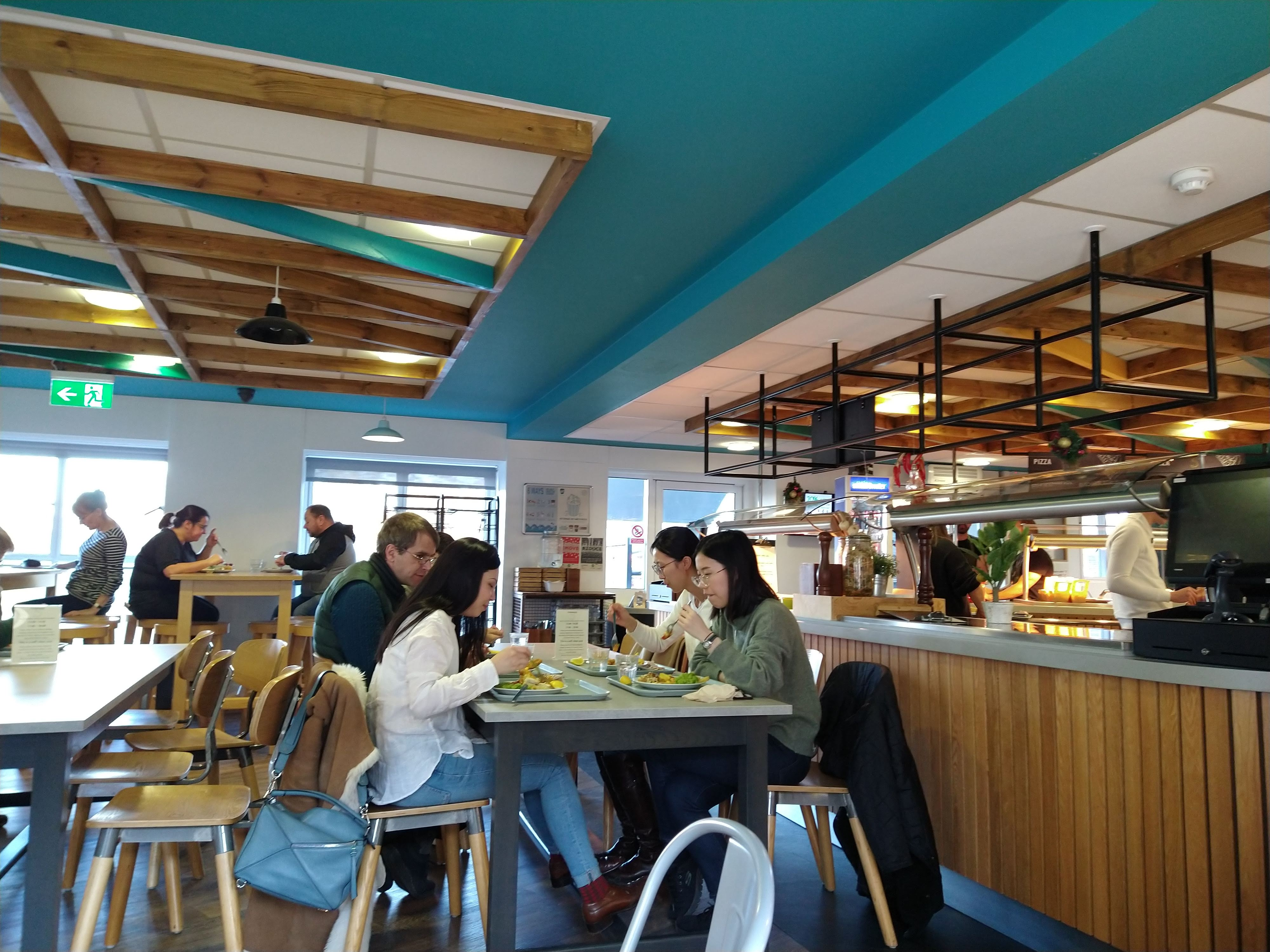
Birkbeck College restaurant

Birkbeck is principally located between Malet Street and Woburn Square in Bloomsbury. The School of Arts, including the Department of English & Humanities, is housed in Virginia Woolf's former residence in Gordon Square, Bloomsbury. (Other notable former residents of the house include John Maynard Keynes, Vanessa Bell and Lydia Lopokova.) The building includes the Birkbeck Cinema. and the Peltz Gallery.

Many Birkbeck classes are taught at other locations around Bloomsbury, not only because Birkbeck is committed to widening participation in higher education, but also because nearly all classes on any one day are taught at the same time, resulting in heavy competition for limited space.

Birkbeck expanded into East London in November 2013. The Stratford campus transferred to the adjacent University of East London in July 2021.

A building on Euston Road was refurbished by Penoyre & Prasad to be used by Birkbeck in 2021.

In 2021 it was announced that Birkbeck would be leasing Student Central. After refurbishment, the building reopened during the 2022-23 academic year.

== Organisation ==
=== Faculties and schools ===
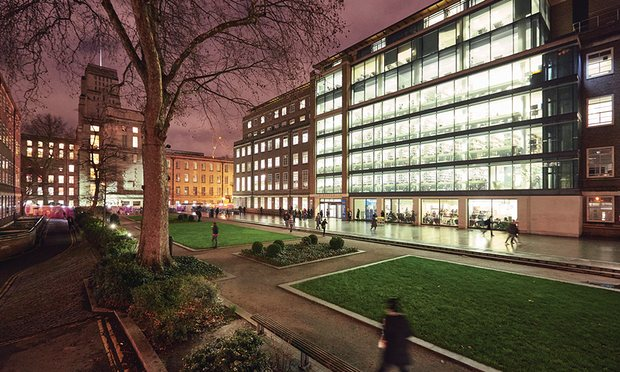
Bloomsbury campus at night

The college was previously organised into five schools comprising 19 departments, but was reorganised into three faculties comprising nine schools in 2023:

- Faculty of Business and Law
  - Birkbeck Business School
  - Birkbeck Law School
- Faculty of Humanities and Social Science
  - School of Creative Arts, Culture and Communication
  - School of Historical Studies
  - School of Social Sciences
  - Birkbeck Centre for Counselling
- Faculty of Science
  - School of Computing and Mathematical Sciences
  - School of Natural Sciences
  - School of Psychological Sciences

== Academic profile ==
=== Research and teaching ===
The Birkbeck Institute for the Humanities (BIH) was established in 2004, with the renowned but controversial Slovenian philosopher Slavoj Žižek appointed as International Director, a position he held until 2025. According to its website, the Institute aims to "engage with important public issues of our time through a series of open debates, lectures, seminars and conferences" and to "foster and promote a climate of interdisciplinary research and collaboration among academics and researchers". The launch of the Institute was not without controversy, provoking an article in The Observer titled "What have intellectuals ever done for the world?" which criticised the ostensible irrelevance and elitism of contemporary public intellectuals. The current director of the institute is Costas Douzinas.

2004 also saw Birkbeck enter into a research and teaching collaboration with the Institute of Education, jointly founding the London Knowledge Lab. This interdisciplinary research institute brings together social scientists and computer scientists to address research questions about technology and learning.

Meanwhile, the London Consortium, a graduate school that represents a collaboration between Birkbeck, the Tate Galleries, the Institute of Contemporary Arts, the Architectural Association, and, until 1999, the British Film Institute, has been running since the mid-1990s, offering master's and doctoral degrees in interdisciplinary humanities and cultural studies. Its permanent and adjunct faculty has included Tom McCarthy, Colin MacCabe, Laura Mulvey, Steven Connor, Marina Warner, Juliet Mitchell, Stuart Hall, the late Roger Scruton, Salman Rushdie, Tilda Swinton as well as Slavoj Žižek. Its current chair is Anthony Julius.

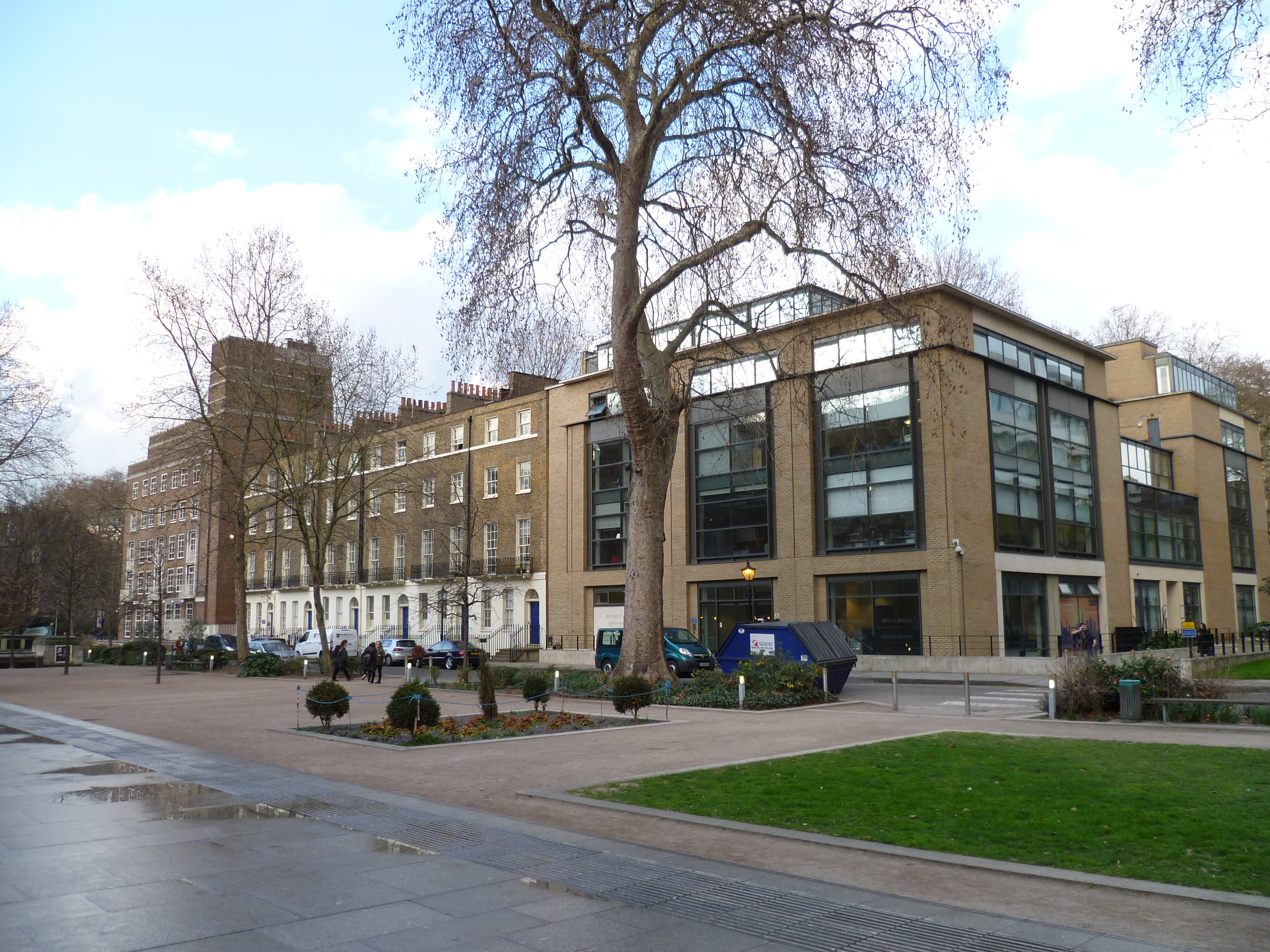
Torrington Square and Birkbeck's Clore Management Centre (right)

David Latchman, who became Master of the Birkbeck in 2003, forged closer relations between Birkbeck and University College London (UCL). Joint research centres include the UCL/Birkbeck Institute for Earth and Planetary Sciences, UCL/Birkbeck/IoE Centre for Educational Neuroscience, the UCL/Birkbeck Institute of Structural and Molecular Biology, and the Birkbeck-UCL Centre for Neuroimaging.

Science research at Birkbeck has a notable tradition. David Bohm, who made notable contributions to the theory of quantum mechanics, was Professor of Theoretical Physics from 1961 to 1987, and other distinguished Birkbeck scientists include Aaron Klug in the Department of crystallography, Derek Barton in the Department of Chemistry, and Roger Penrose and David Bohm in the Department of Physics. Kathleen Booth wrote the first computer assembly language. Birkbeck is part of the Institute of Structural Molecular Biology, which includes the Bloomsbury Centre for Structural biology, established in 1998. This is a collaborative venture between Birkbeck and UCL, and is a leading academic centre for translating gene sequences and determining protein structure and function. It also includes the Bloomsbury Centre for Bioinformatics, a collaborative venture also between Birkbeck College and University College London for research into Bioinformatics, Genomics, Systems Biology, Grid computing and Text mining.

Birkbeck was ranked 13th in The Guardian's 2001 Research Assessment Exercise and 26th in the Times Higher Education's equivalent table. In the 2008 RAE results, Birkbeck ranked in the top 25% of UK multi-faculty Higher Education Institutions. The RAE rated the quality of research in a range of subjects at 159 Higher Education Institutions in the UK. Birkbeck submissions from Earth Sciences, Psychology, History, Classics and Archaeology and History of Art, Film and Visual Media were rated in the top five nationally. In REF2014, half of Birkbeck's submissions were rated in the top 20 nationally, and eight submissions received 100% ranking for Research Environment. 73% of Birkbeck's research was rated "world-leading" (4*) or "internationally excellent" (3*). In the 2021 REF exercise, Birkbeck performed very well throughout, with notable success in English Language & Literature, where Birkbeck was second nationally, and Art and Design, where Birkbeck was fourth nationally.

=== Rankings ===
Rankings
National rankings
- Complete (2027): 40th
- Guardian (2027): 39th
- Times / Sunday Times (2027): 41st

Global rankings
- ARWU (2026): 801–900
- QS (2027): 354=
- THE (2026): 301–350

Birkbeck's Centre for Brain Function and Development was awarded The Queen's Anniversary Prize for its brain research in 2005. In 2010, Birkbeck was shortlisted for the Times Higher Education University of the Year Award.

In 2021 the Times Higher Education World University Rankings ranked Birkbeck 95th in the world for Psychology. The university is consistently ranked in the top 100 in the world by QS World University Rankings for English Language & Literature and Philosophy. Internationally, Birkbeck was ranked within the top 400 universities in the world by the Times Higher Education World University Rankings 2020 and QS World University Rankings 2020.

In 2018 Birkbeck announced that it would withdraw from UK university rankings because their methodologies unfairly penalise it, since "despite having highly rated teaching and research, other factors caused by its unique teaching model and unrelated to its performance push it significantly down the ratings".

== Students' Union ==
The Birkbeck Students' Union (BBKSU) was founded in 1904 and was one of the founding members of the National Union of Students.

Initially governed by a Council, elected from and responsible to the students, today it is governed jointly by a Student Council, Executive Committee and Board of Trustees.

Students initially paid an annual membership fee to join, but students are now automatically registered as members when they enrol onto a course at the college.

Birkbeck Students' Union offers a number of student groups for students, as well as a various sports clubs that compete in the LUSL. It also provides student representation, support and advice services, as well as volunteer and employment opportunities.

== Notable people ==
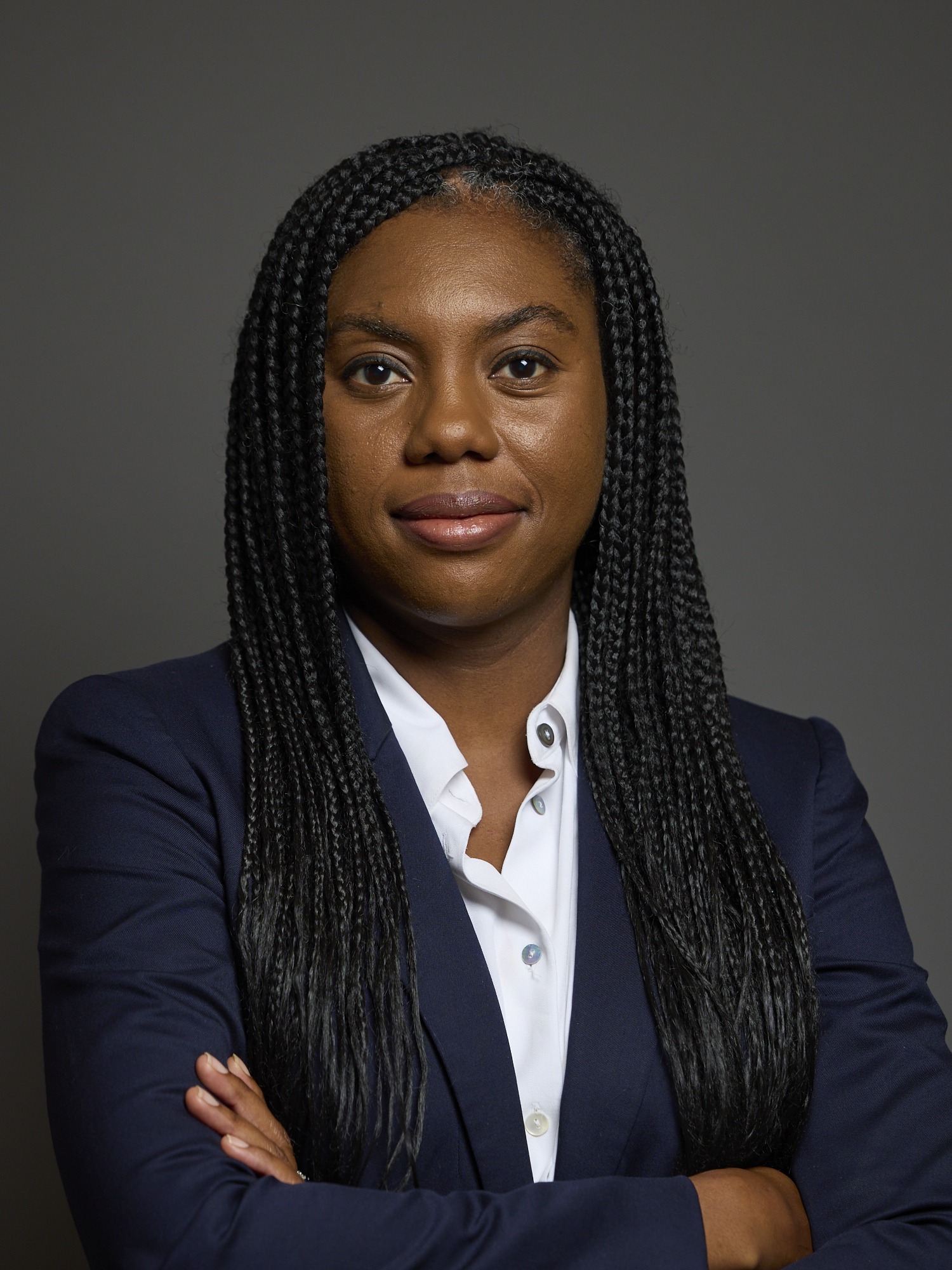
Kemi Badenoch, Member of Parliament (MP) for North West Essex and Leader of the Conservative Party

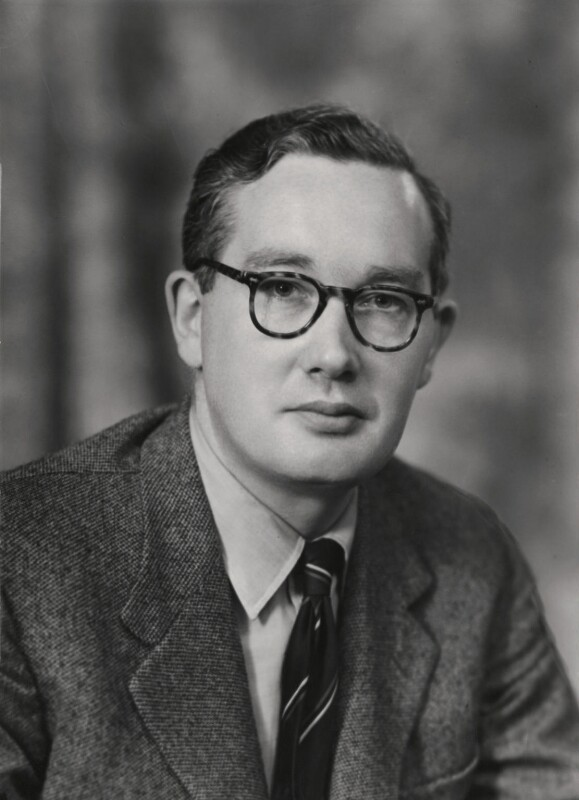
Derek Barton, Organic Chemist and Nobel Prize winner for Chemistry, 1969

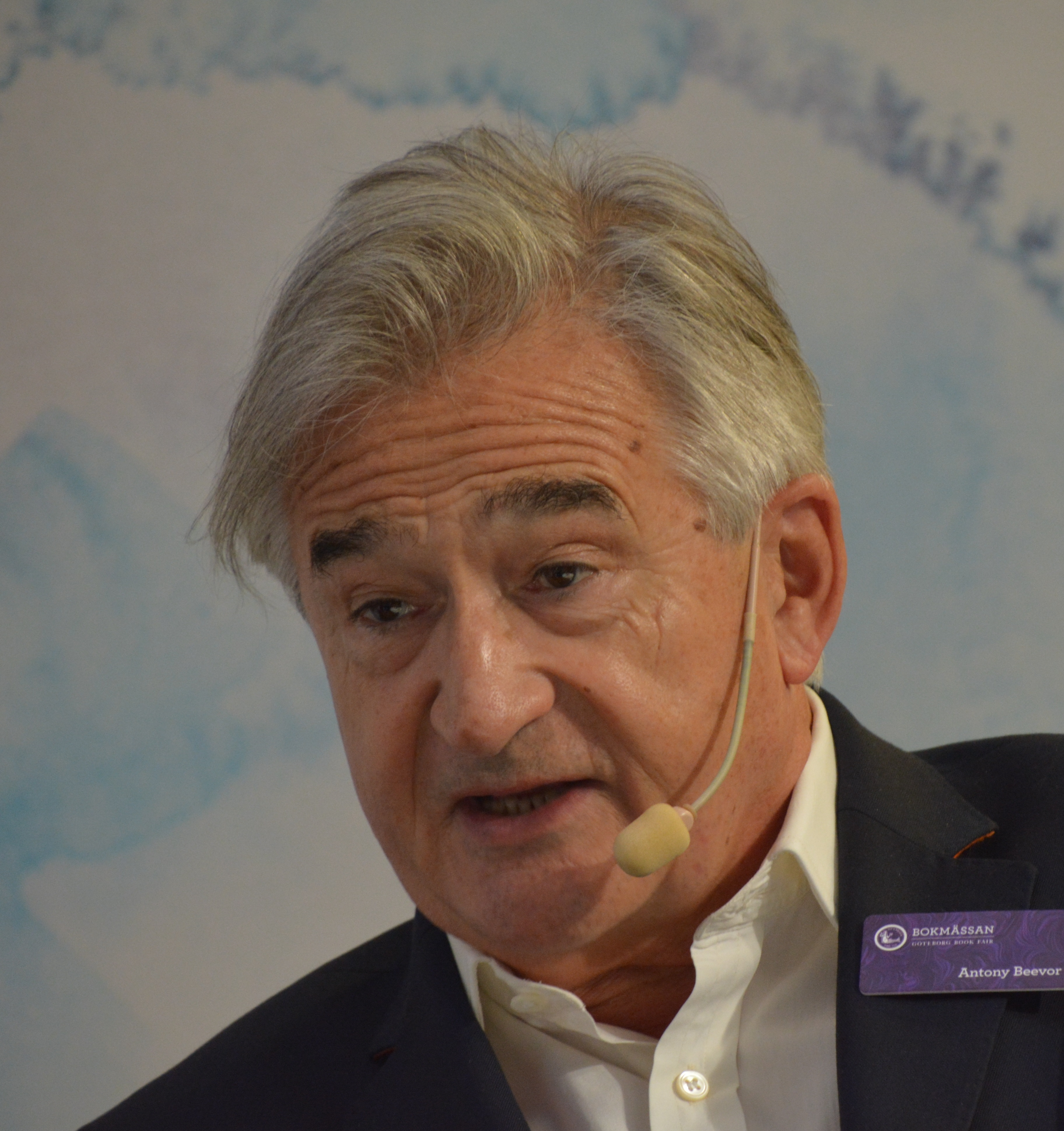
Antony Beevor, Military Historian

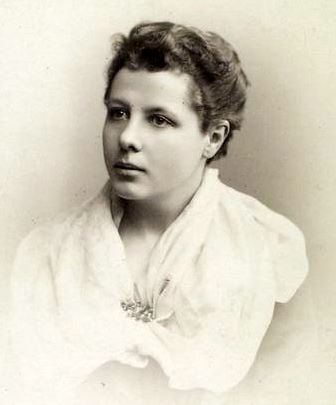
Annie Besant, British socialist, theosophist, women's rights activist, writer and philanthropist.

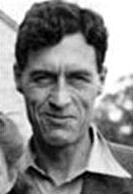
Patrick Blackett, professor of physics and Nobel prize winner in Physics 1948

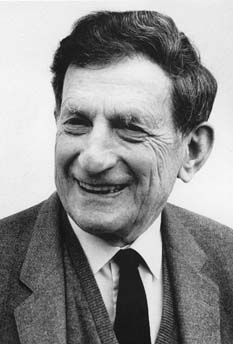
David Bohm, physicist and author

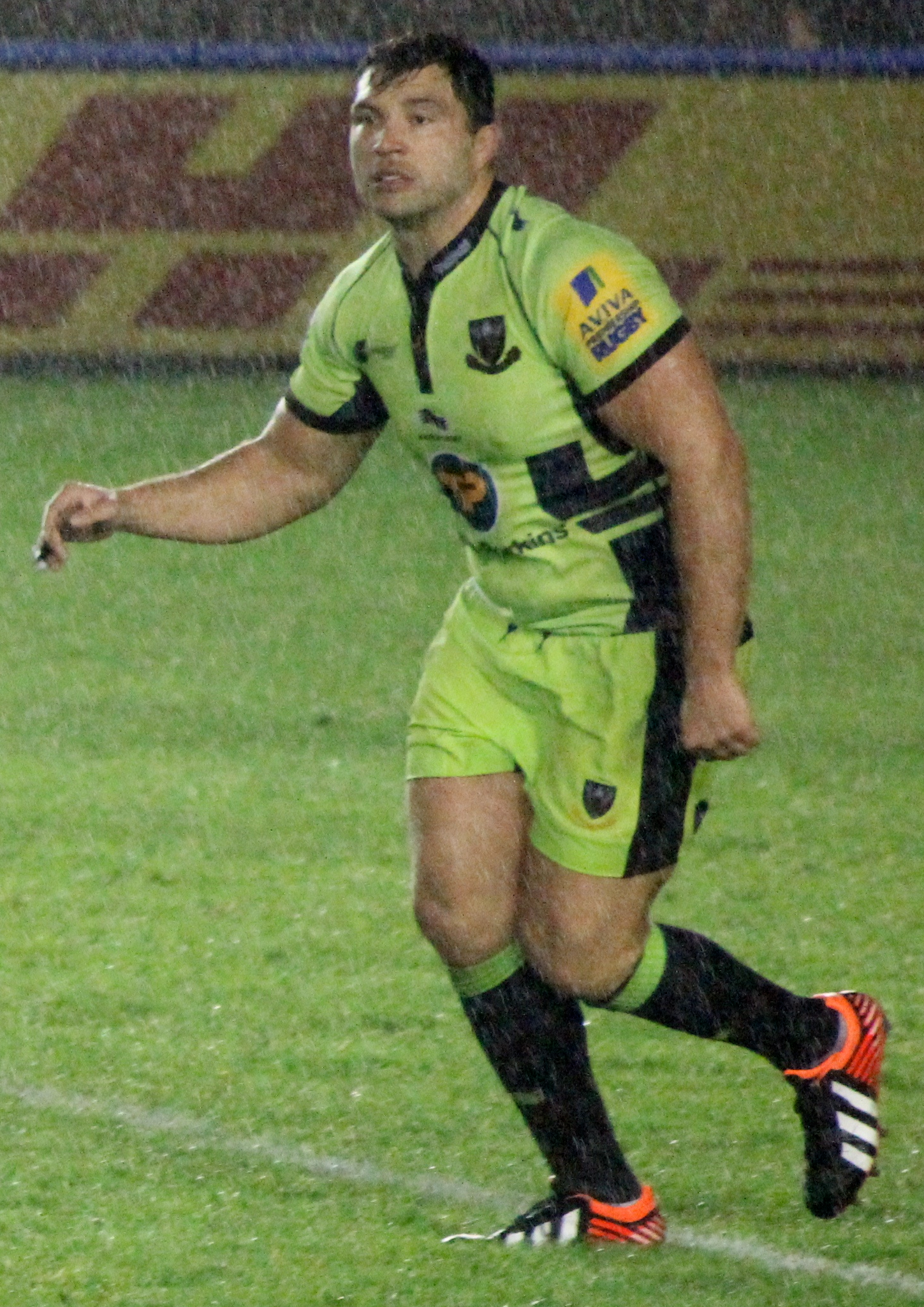
Alex Corbisiero, Rugby union player

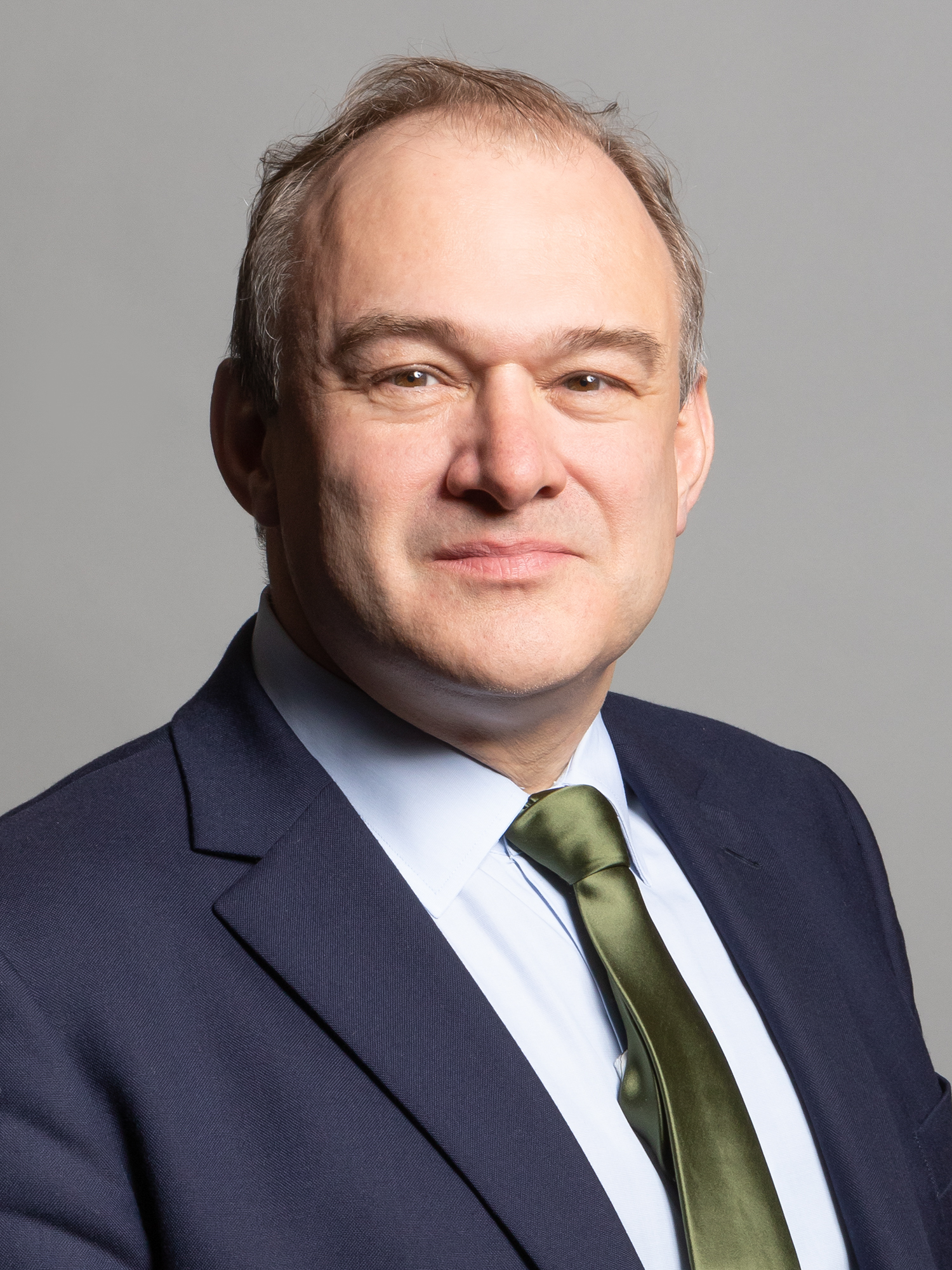
Ed Davey, Leader of the Liberal Democrat Party and former Secretary of State for Energy and Climate Change

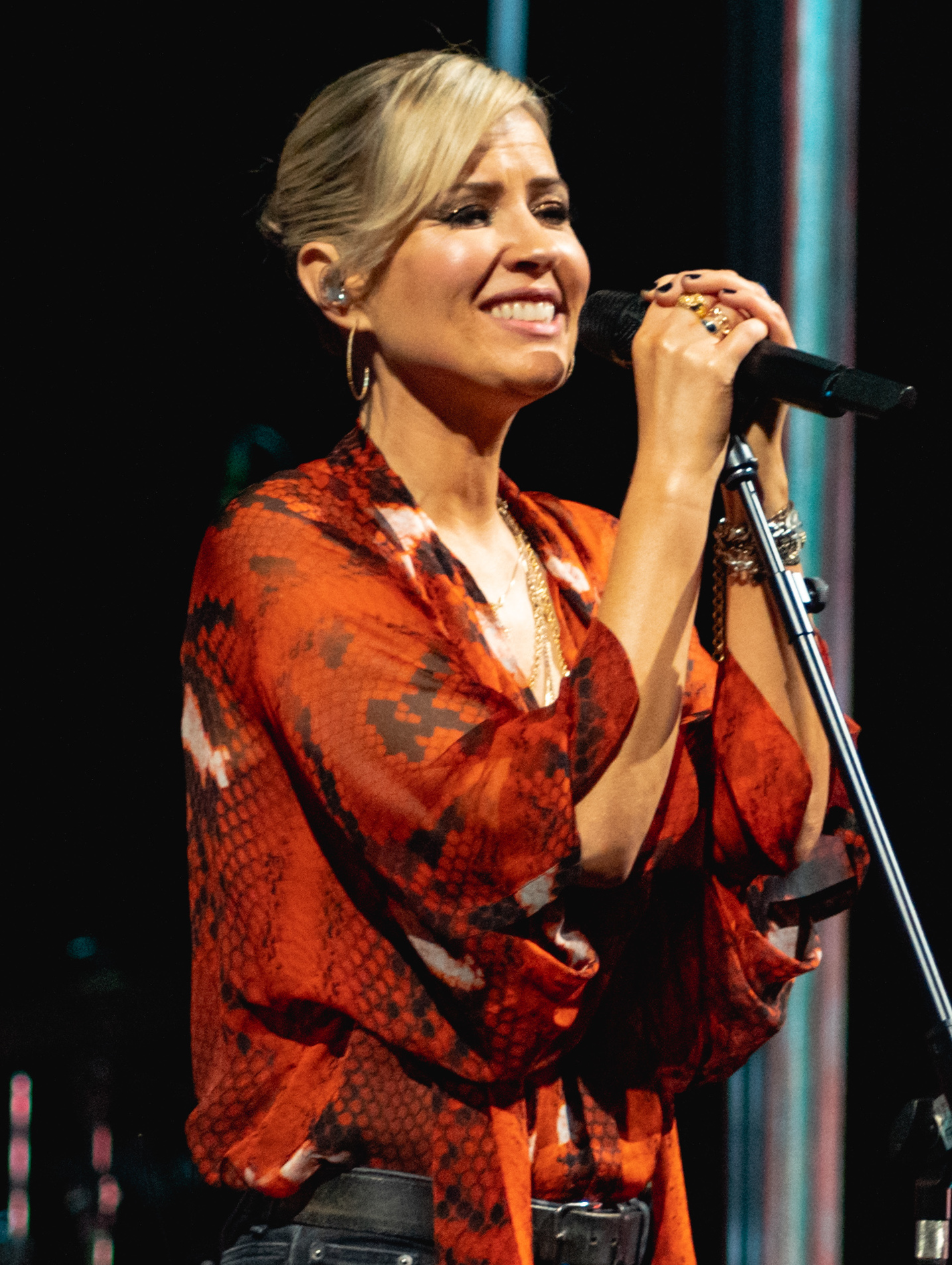
Dido (singer), Multi award-winning Singer/Songwriter and recording artist

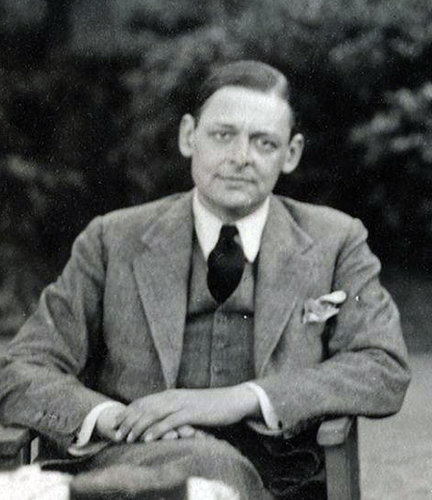
T. S. Eliot, lecturer in English and Nobel prize winner in Literature 1948

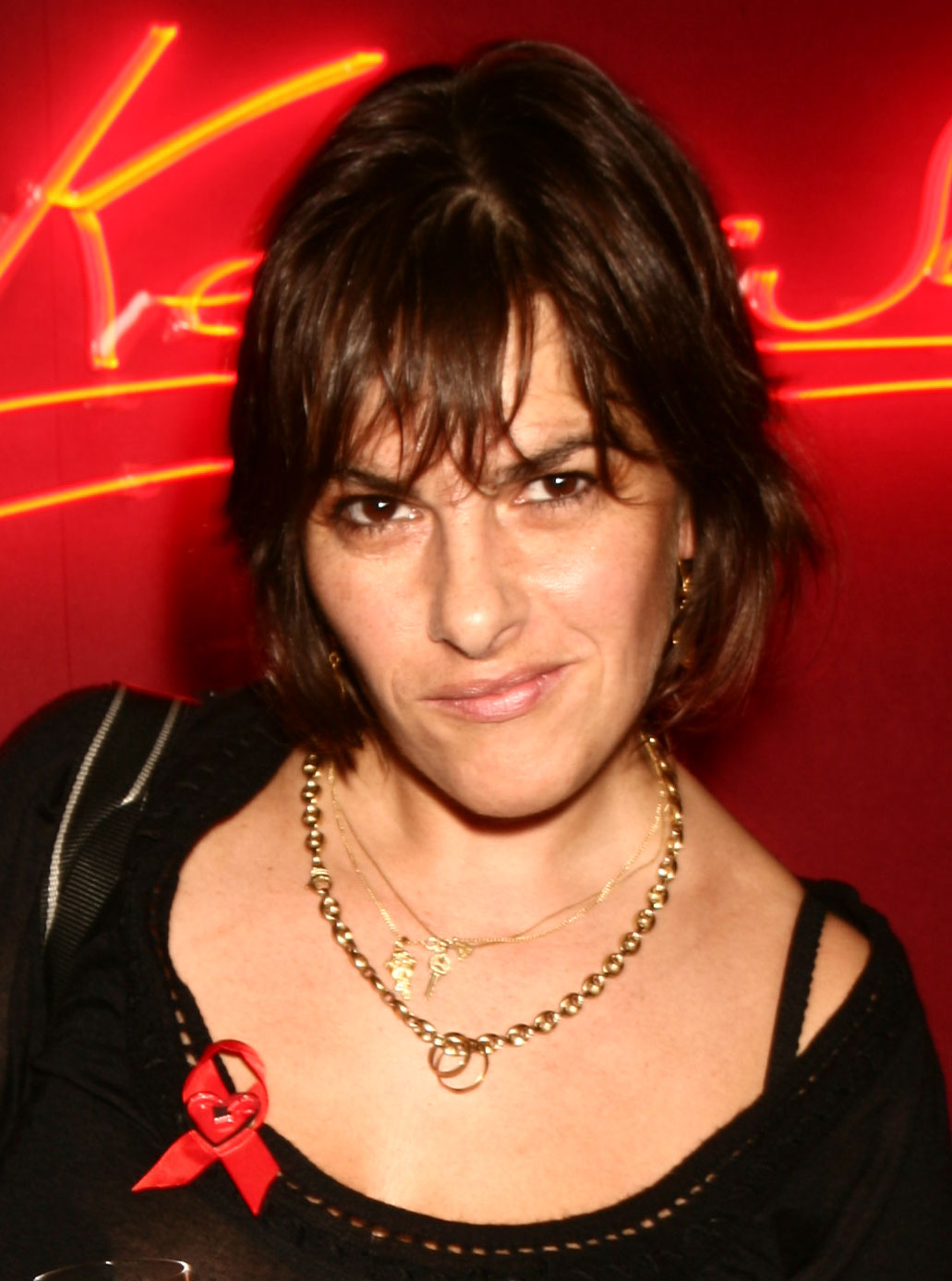
Tracey Emin, British artist

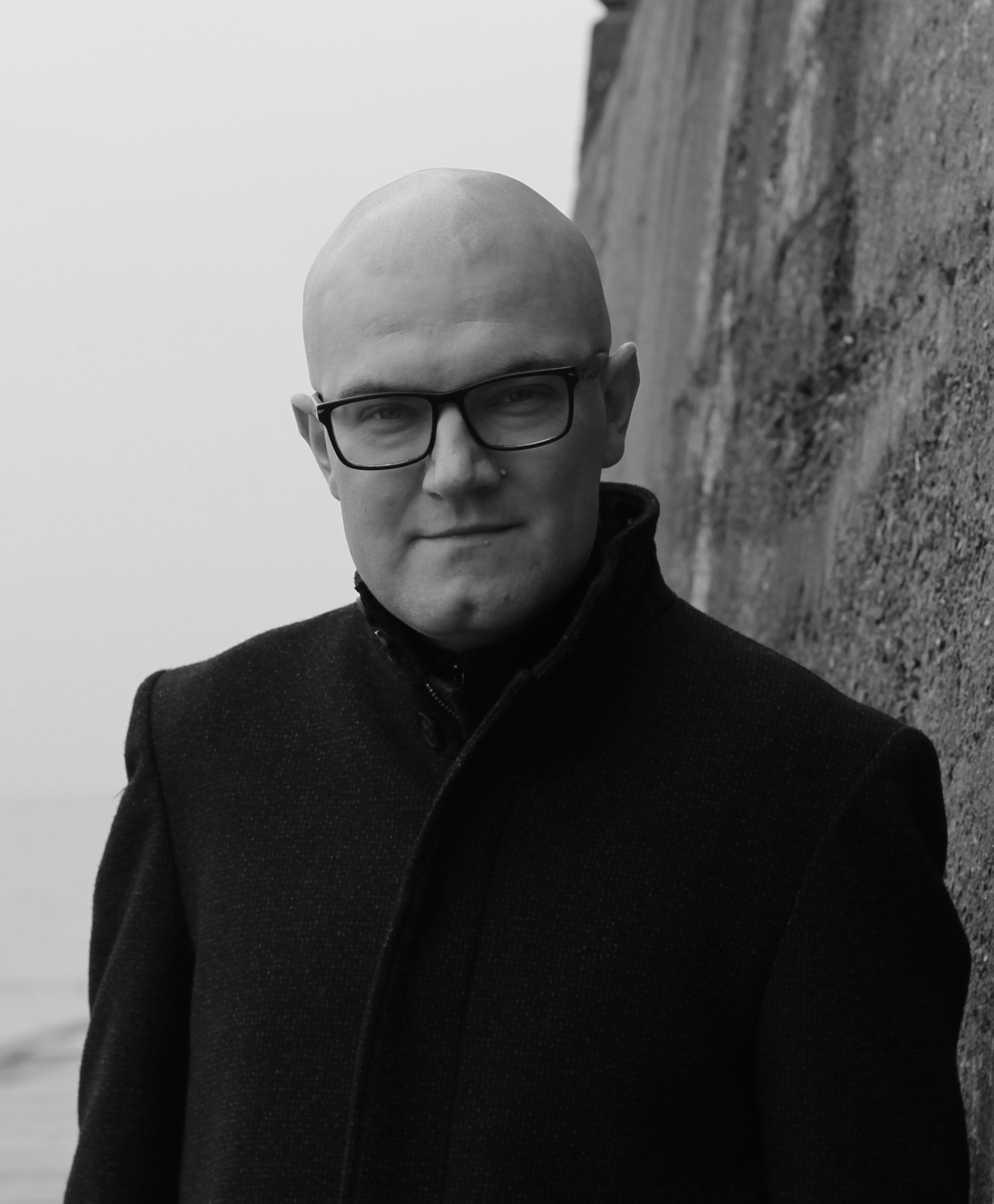
Martin Paul Eve, Professor of Literature, Technology and Publishing

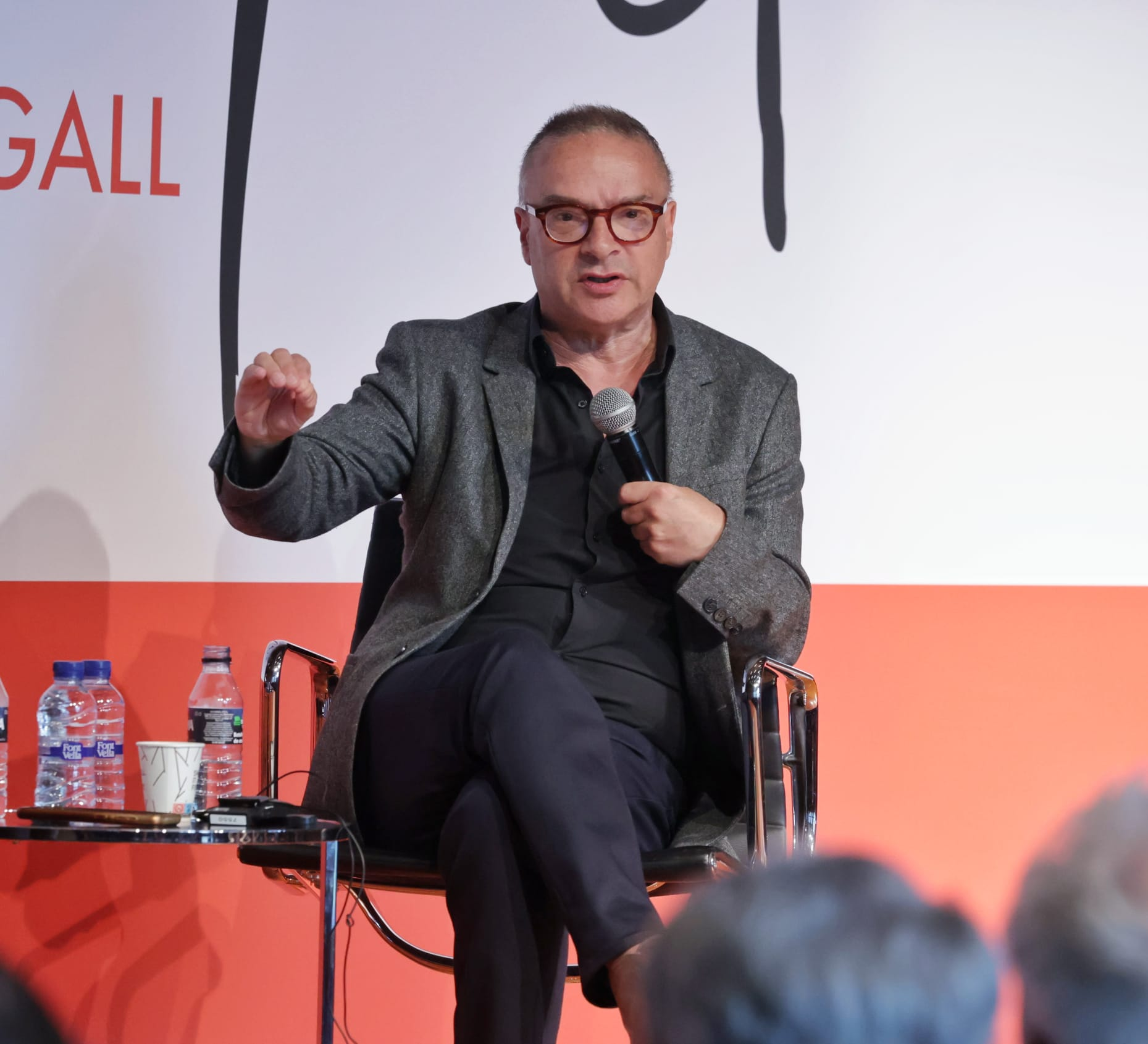
Orlando Figes, historian

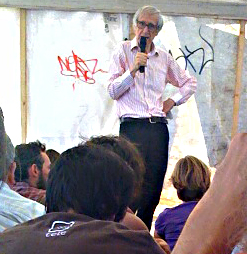
David Fleming, inventor of the Tradable Energy Quotas

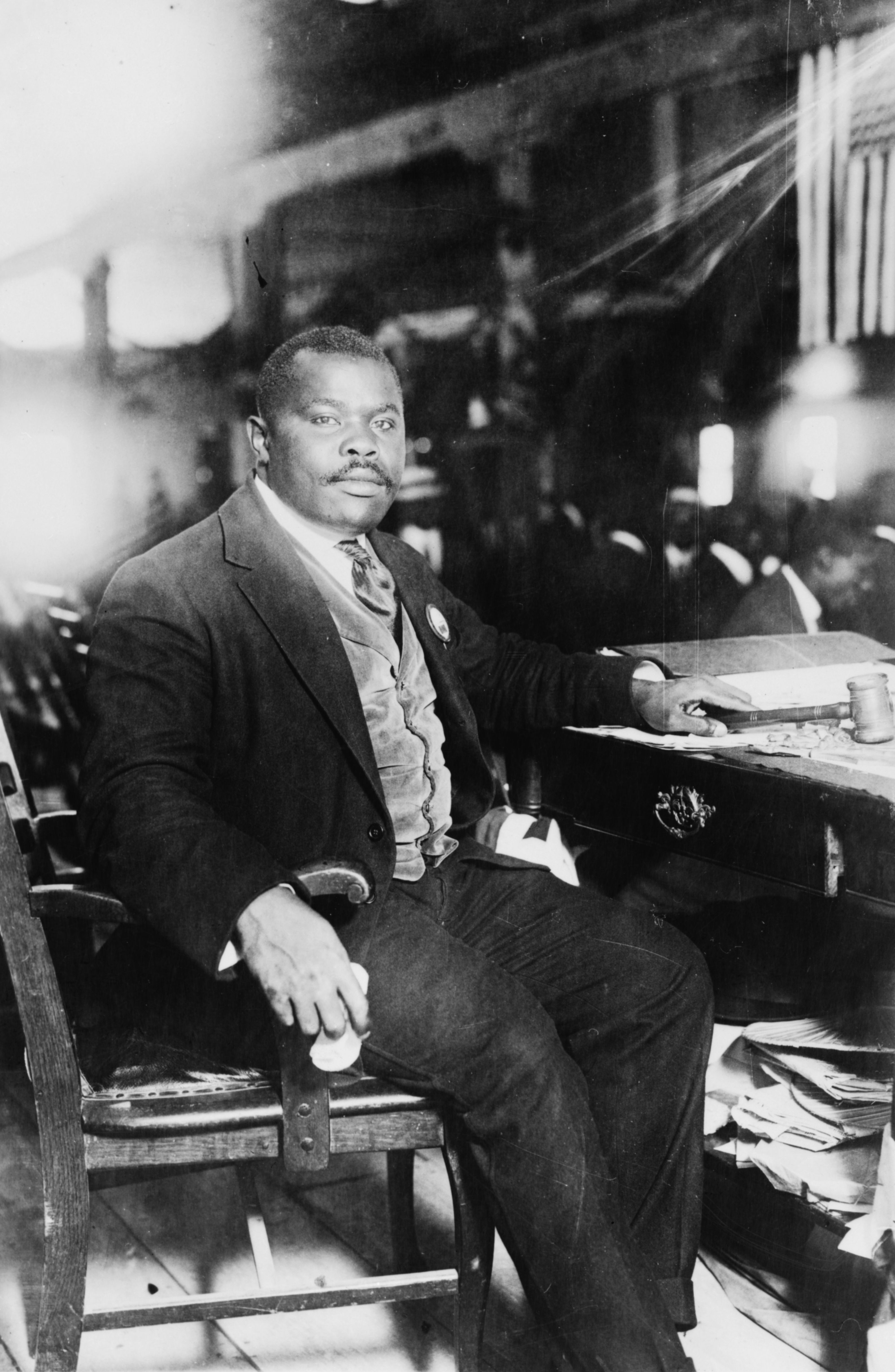
Marcus Garvey, political leader and founder of UNIA-ACL and Black Star Line

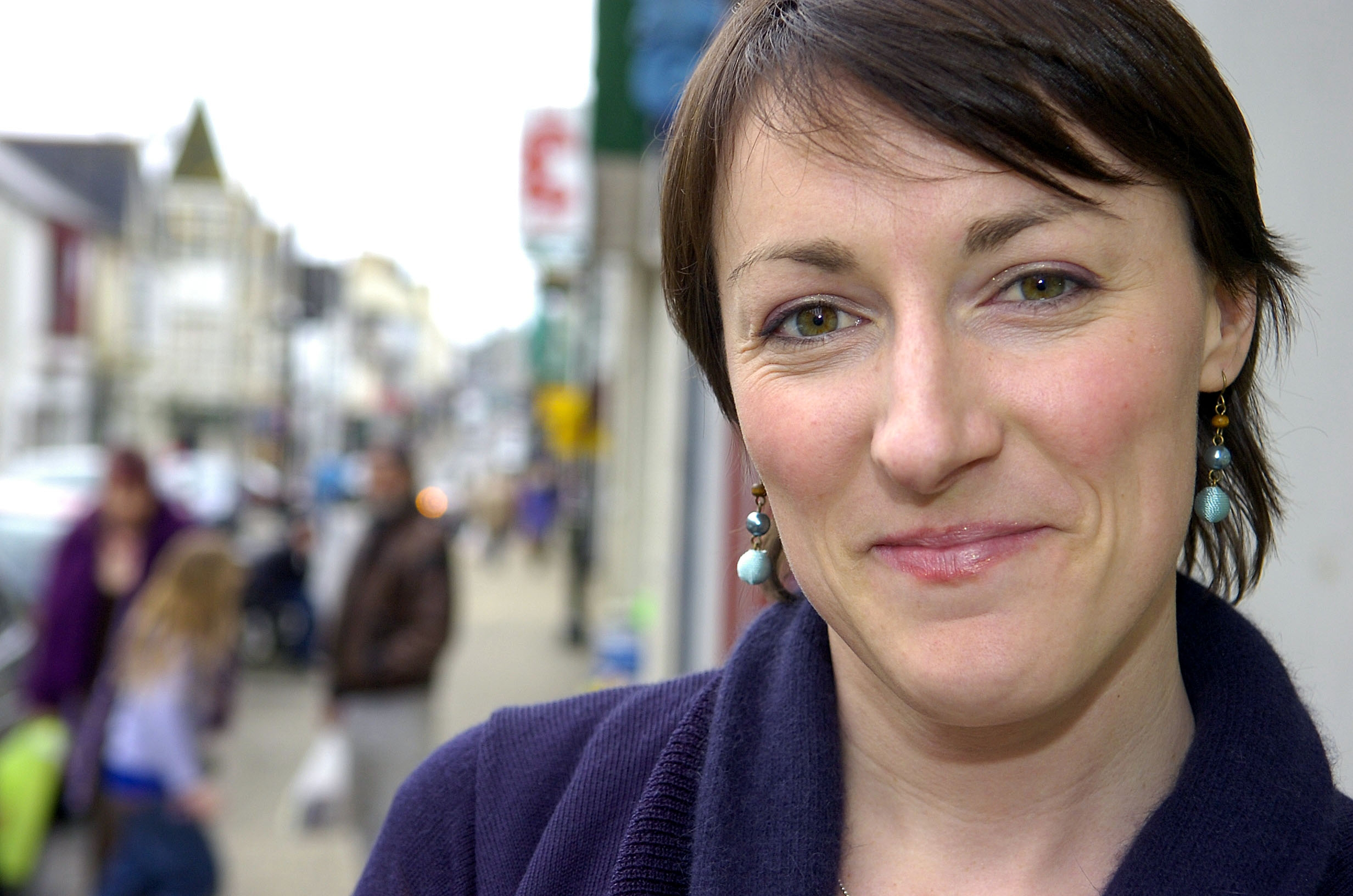
Julia Goldsworthy, British Liberal Democrat politician and former Member of Parliament

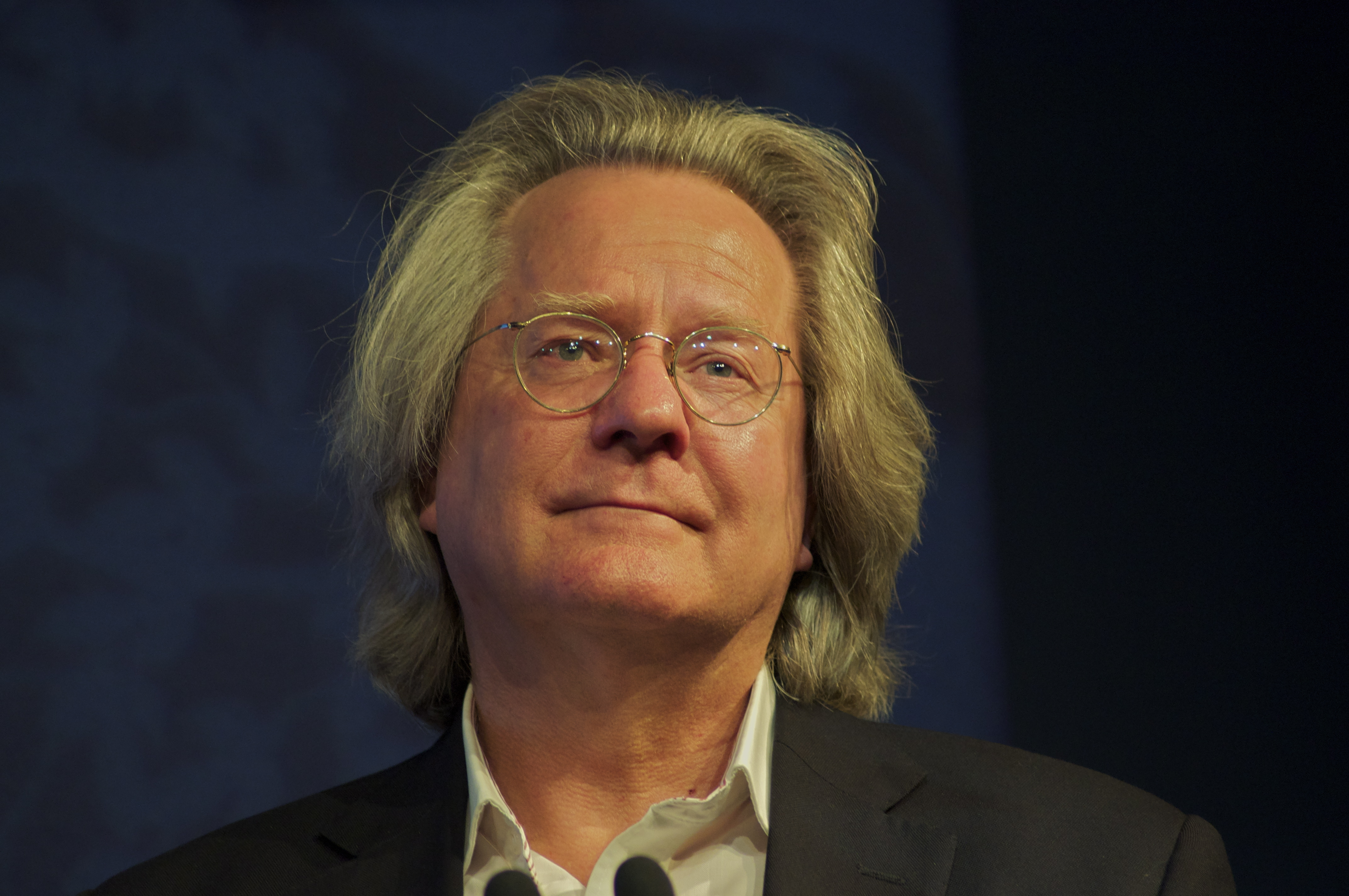
A. C. Grayling, British philosopher and author

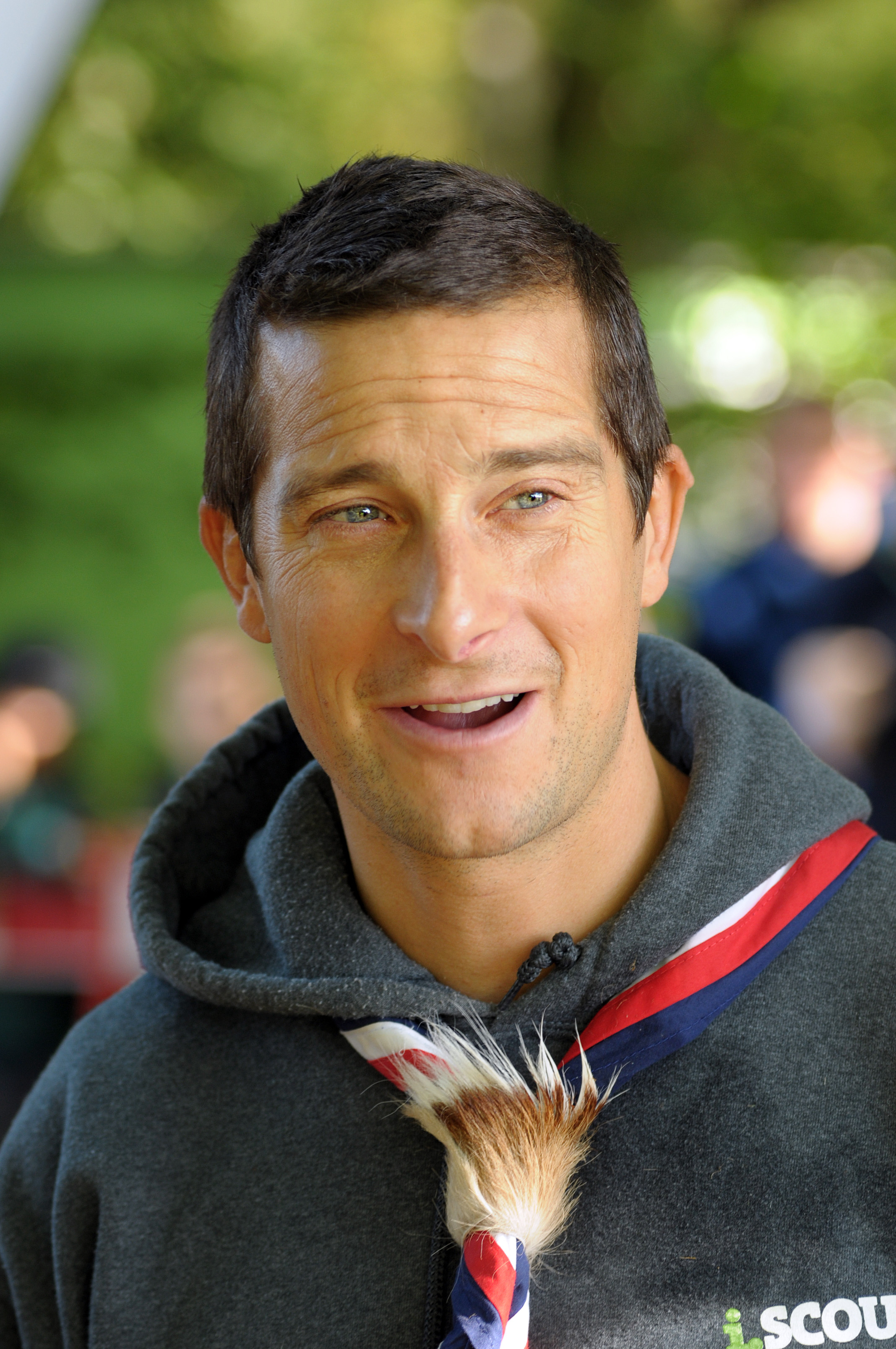
Bear Grylls, adventurer and television presenter

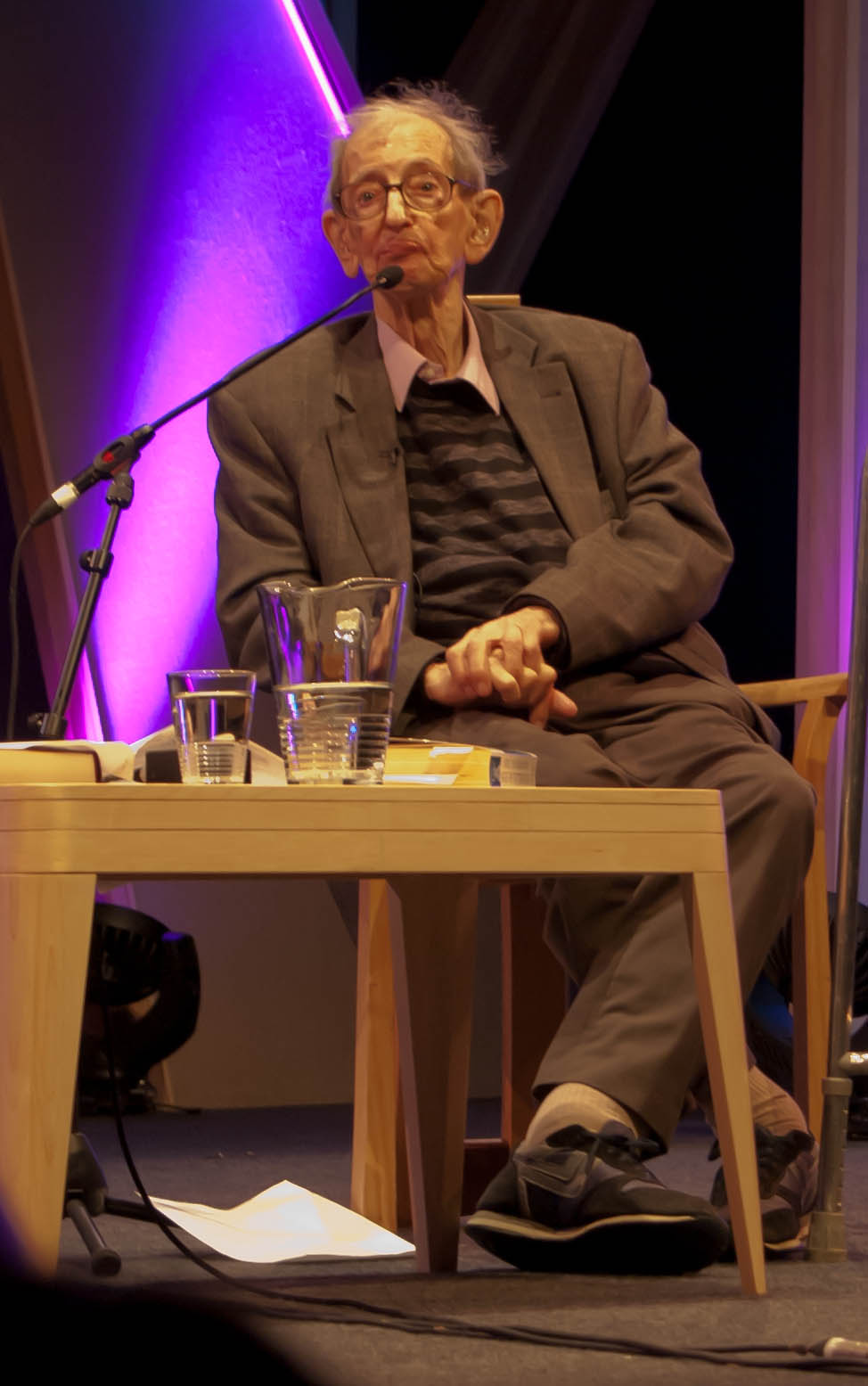
Eric Hobsbawm, historian

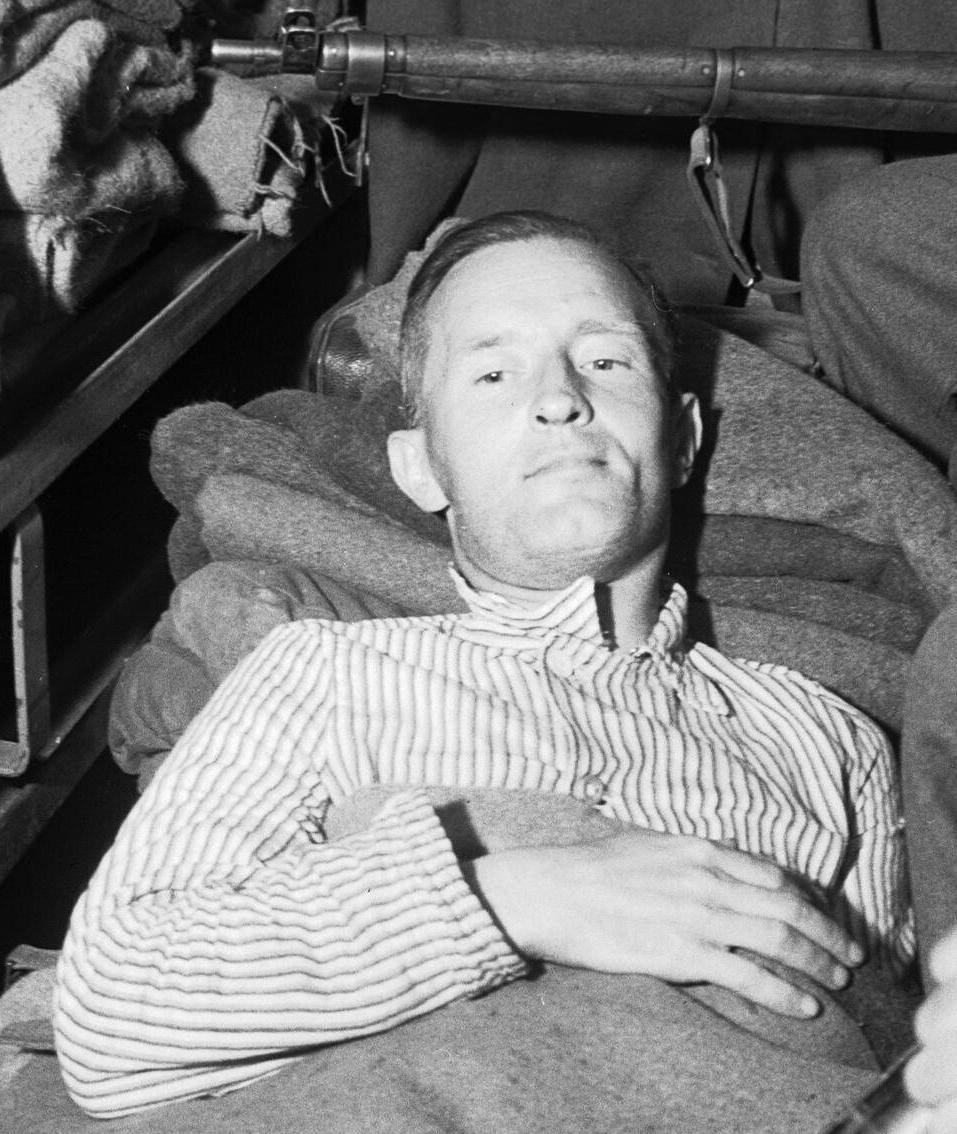
William Joyce, politician and Nazi propaganda broadcaster

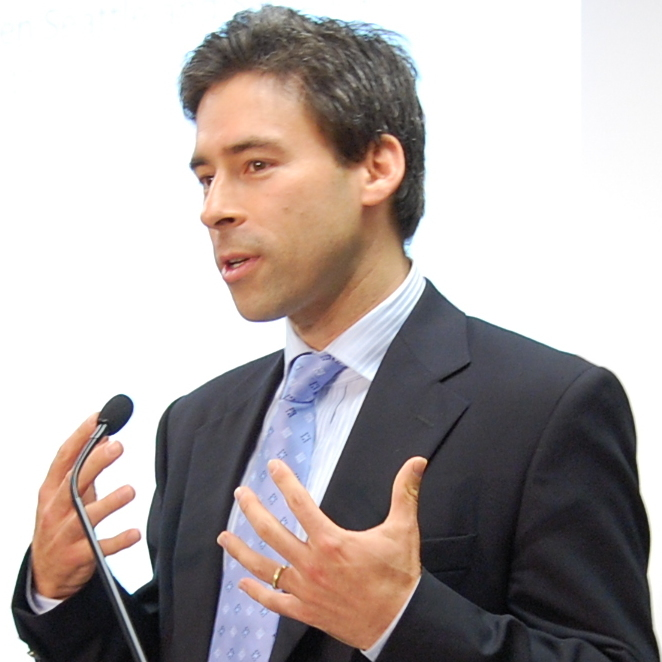
Eric Kaufmann, Canadian professor of politics.

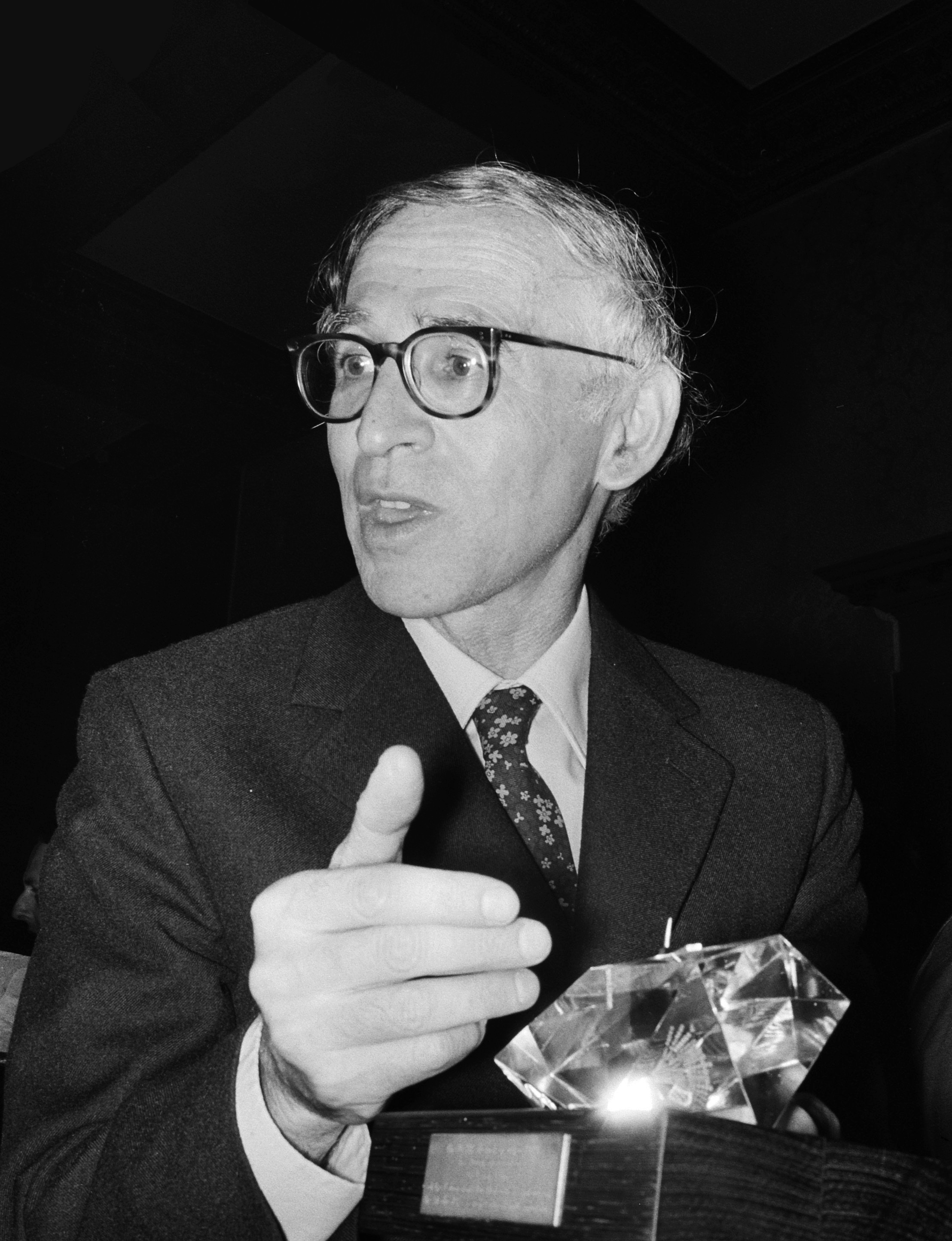
Aaron Klug, winner of the 1982 Nobel Prize in Chemistry

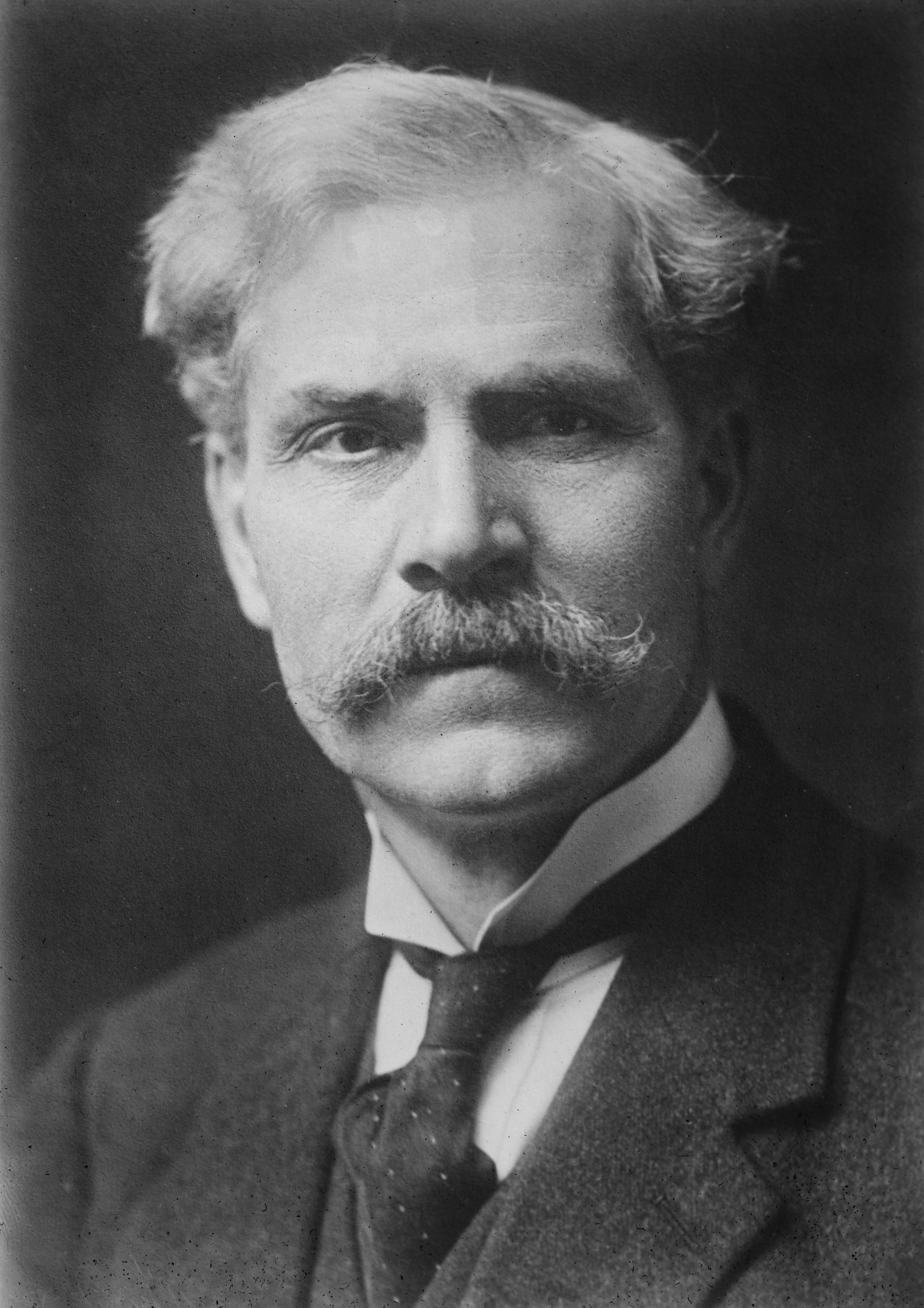
Ramsay MacDonald, first Labour Prime Minister of the United Kingdom

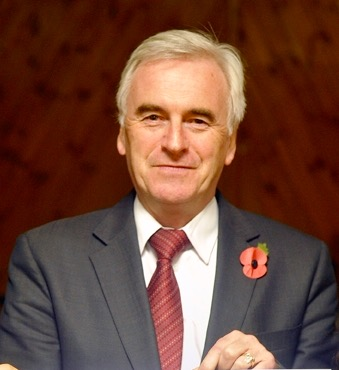
John McDonnell, MP and former Shadow Chancellor of the Exchequer

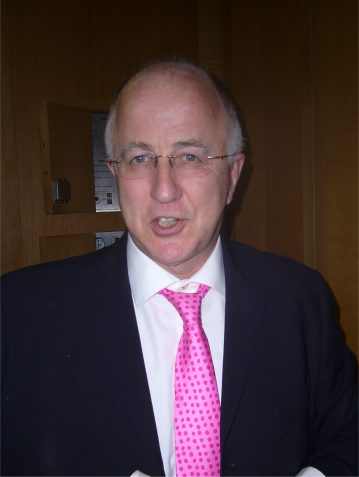
Denis MacShane, British former Labour Member of Parliament

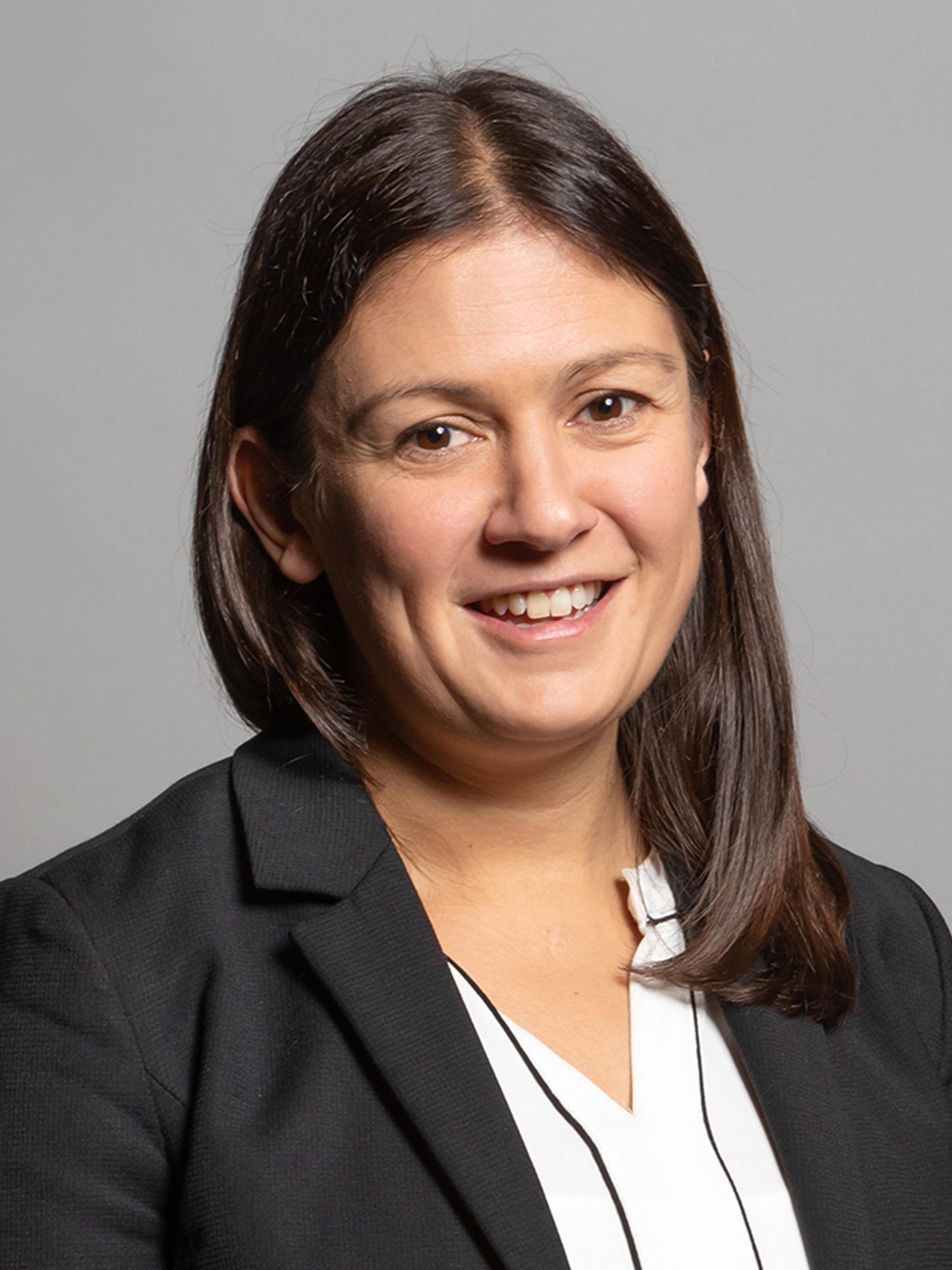
Lisa Nandy, British Labour Member of Parliament.

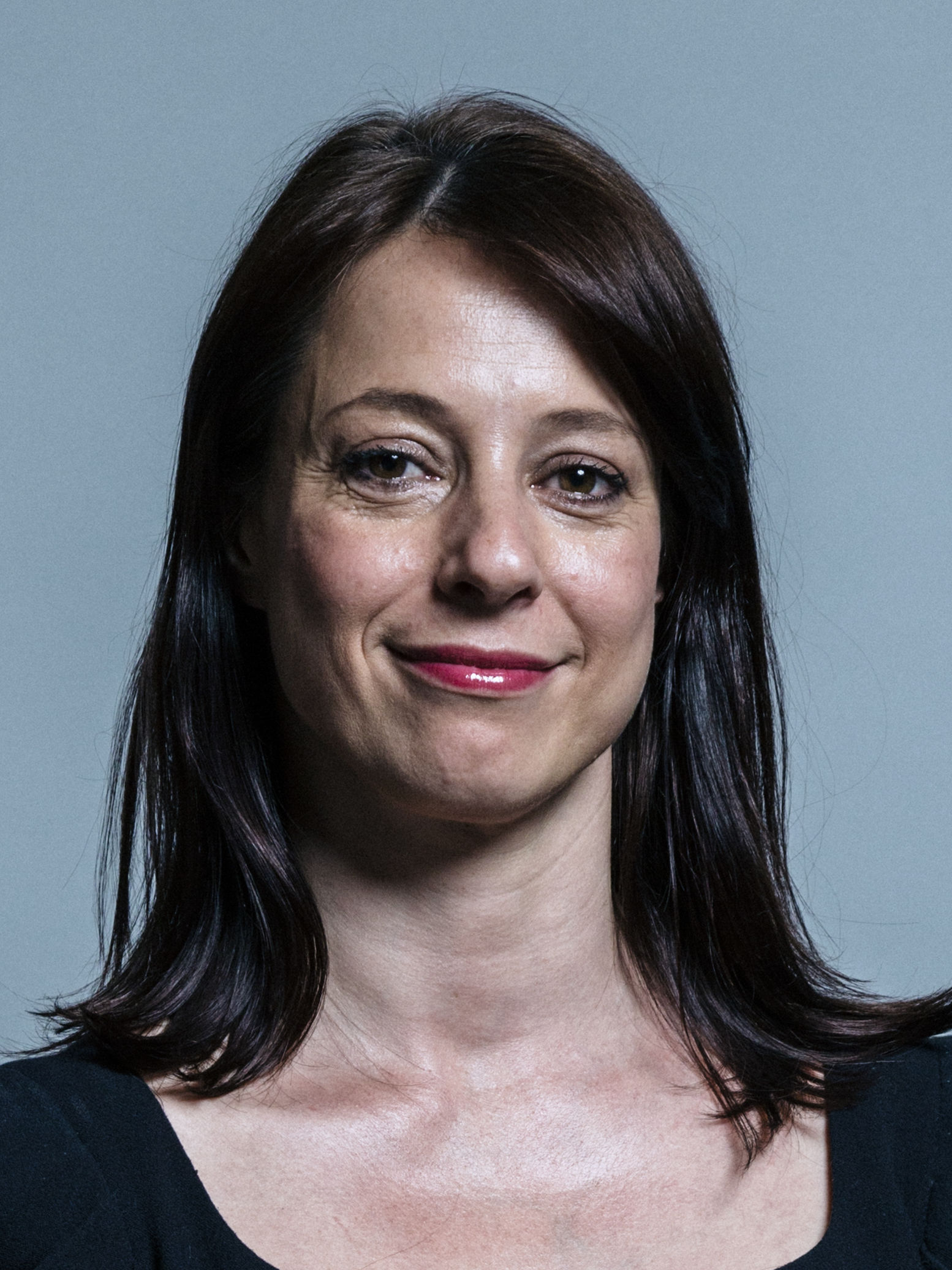
Gloria De Piero, journalist and former Labour Member of Parliament.

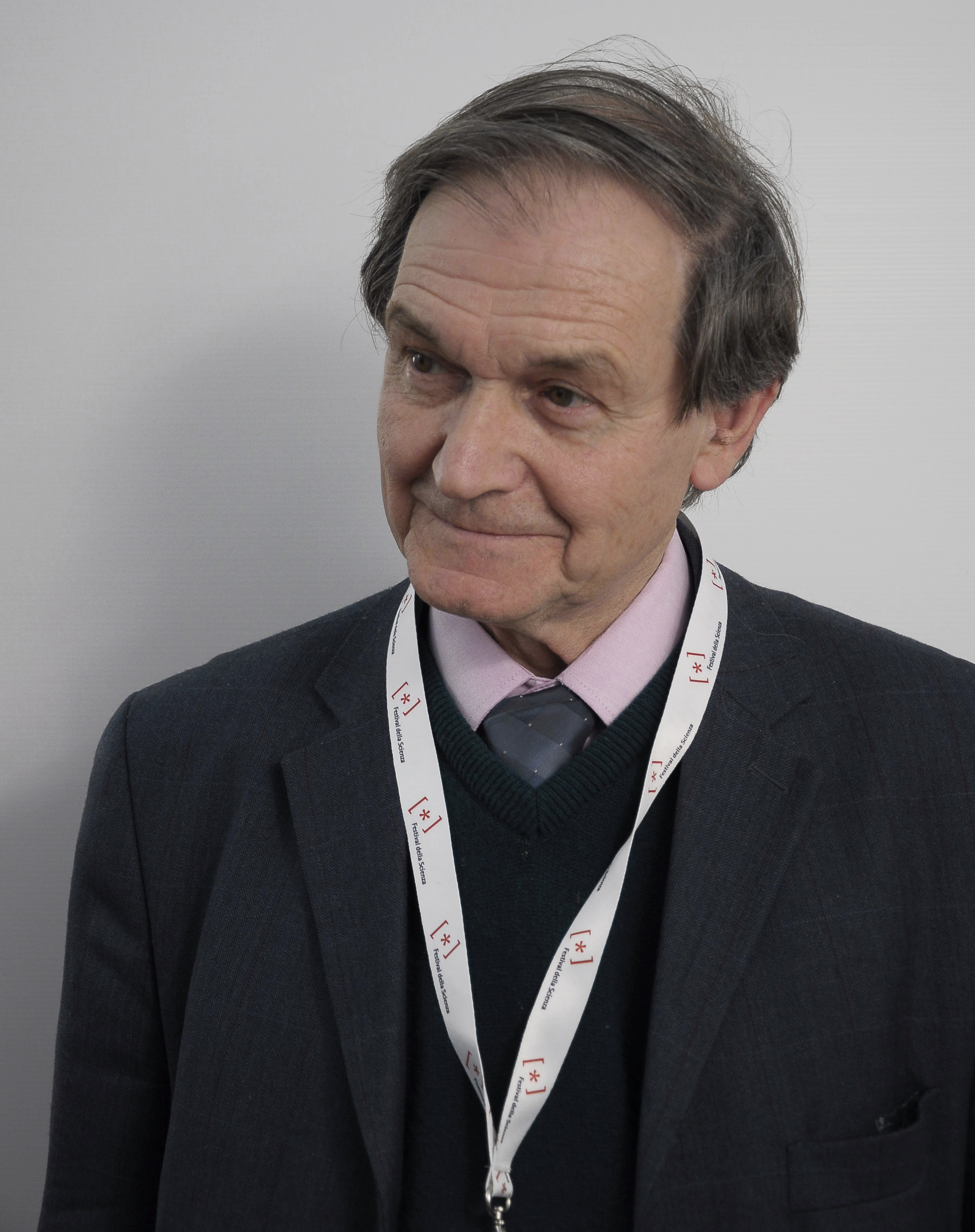
Roger Penrose, physicist and winner of 2020 Nobel Prize in Physics

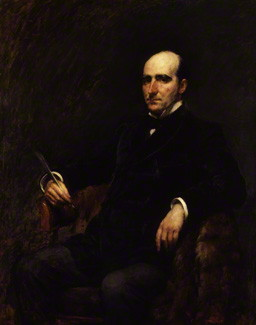
Sir Arthur Wing Pinero, dramatist and stage director

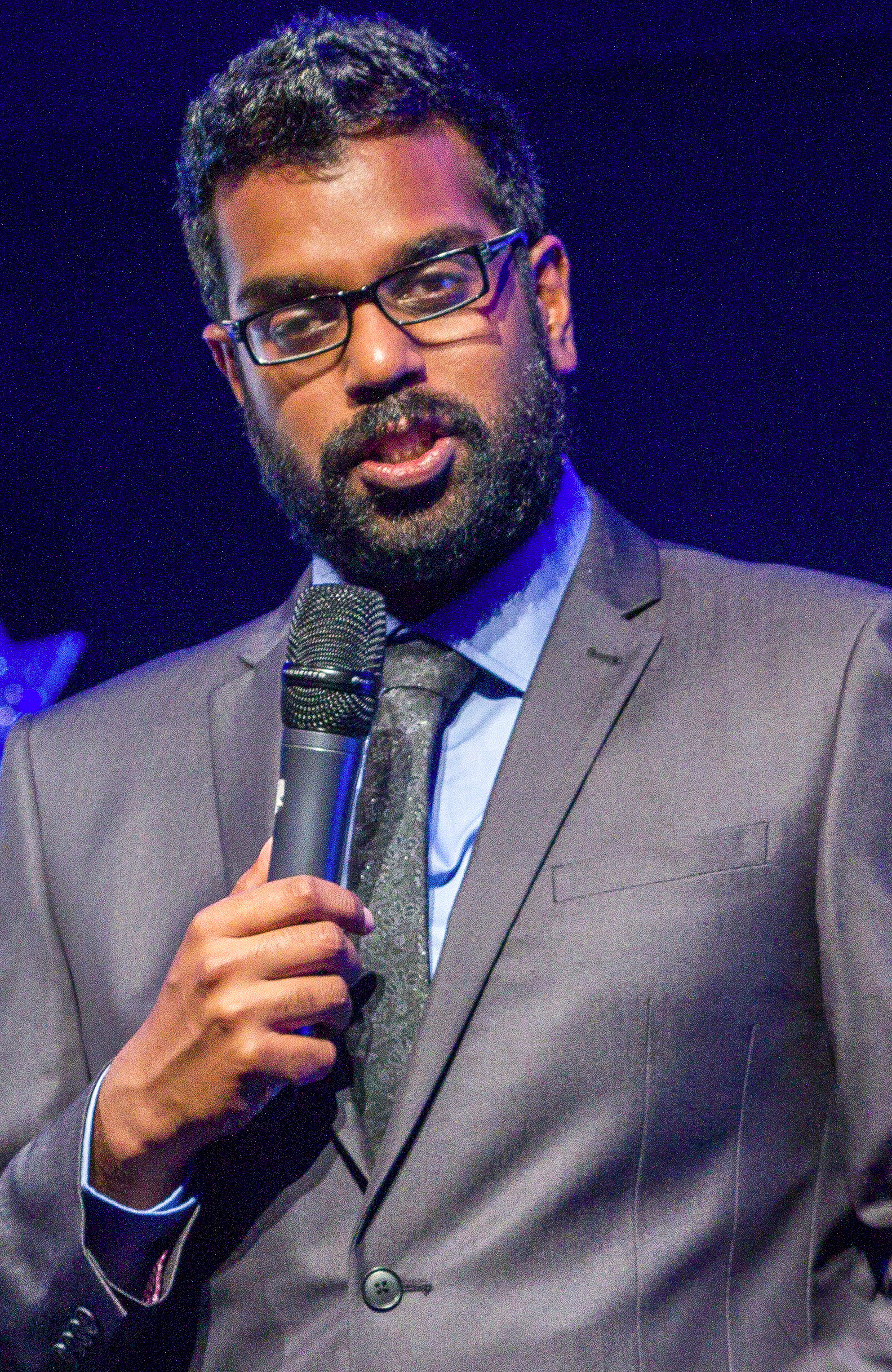
Romesh Ranganathan, British-Sri Lankan actor, radio host and stand-up comedian

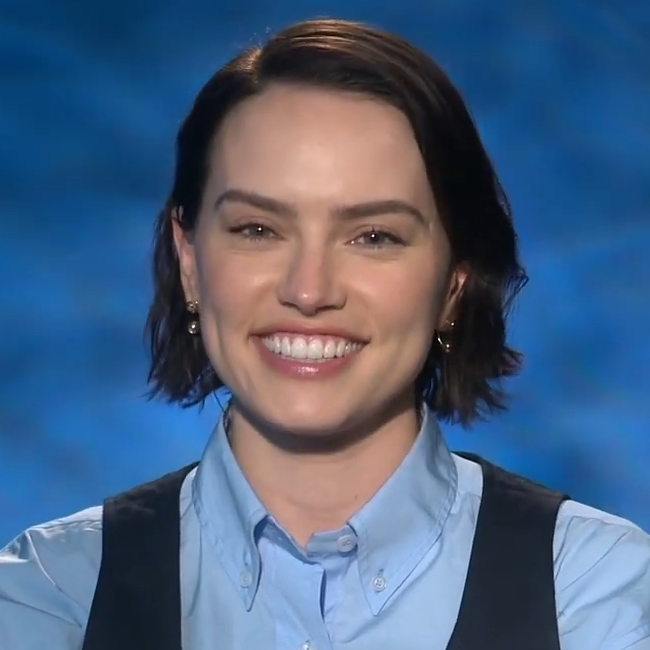
Daisy Ridley, English actress and star of the Star Wars sequel trilogy

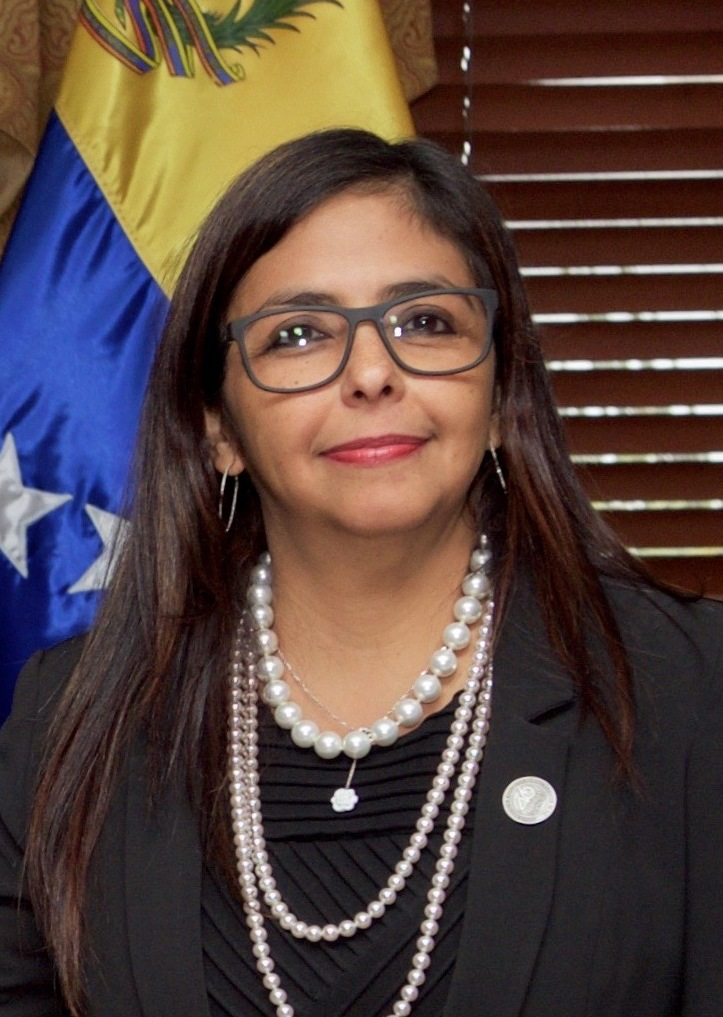
Delcy Rodríguez, Venezuelan politician serving as the vice president of Venezuela since 2018

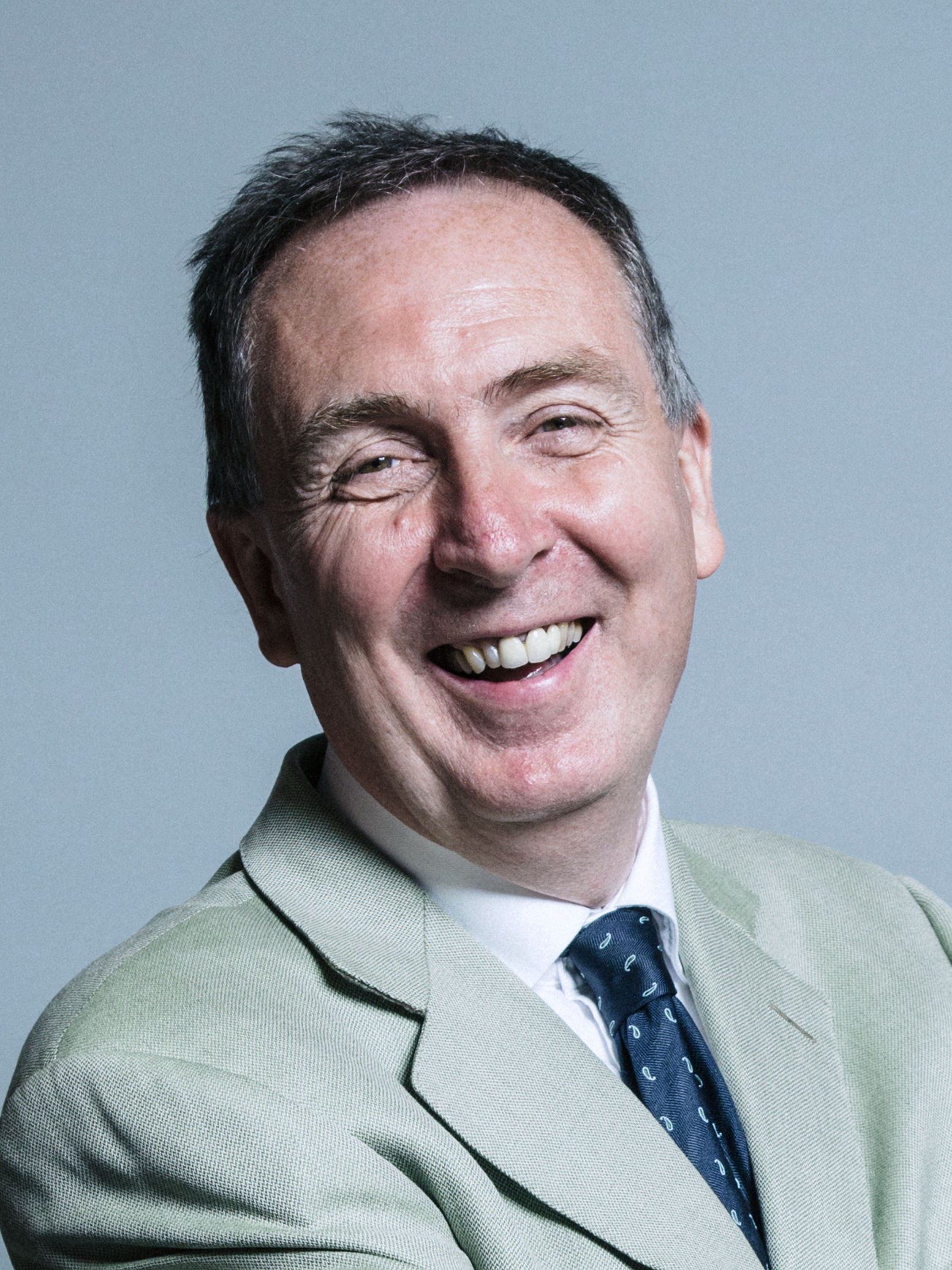
Nick Smith, Welsh Labour Party politician serving as Member of Parliament (MP) for Blaenau Gwent since 2010

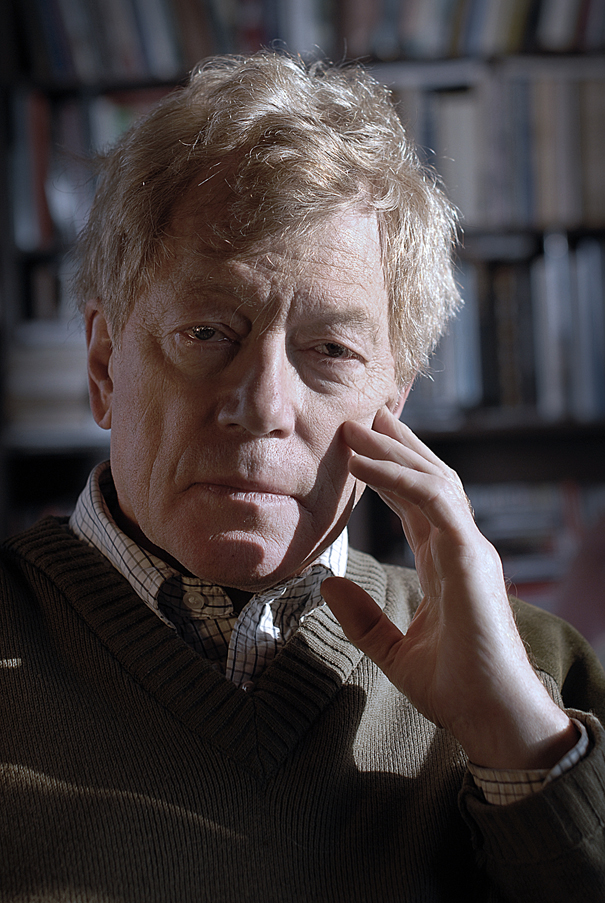
Roger Scruton, philosopher and activist

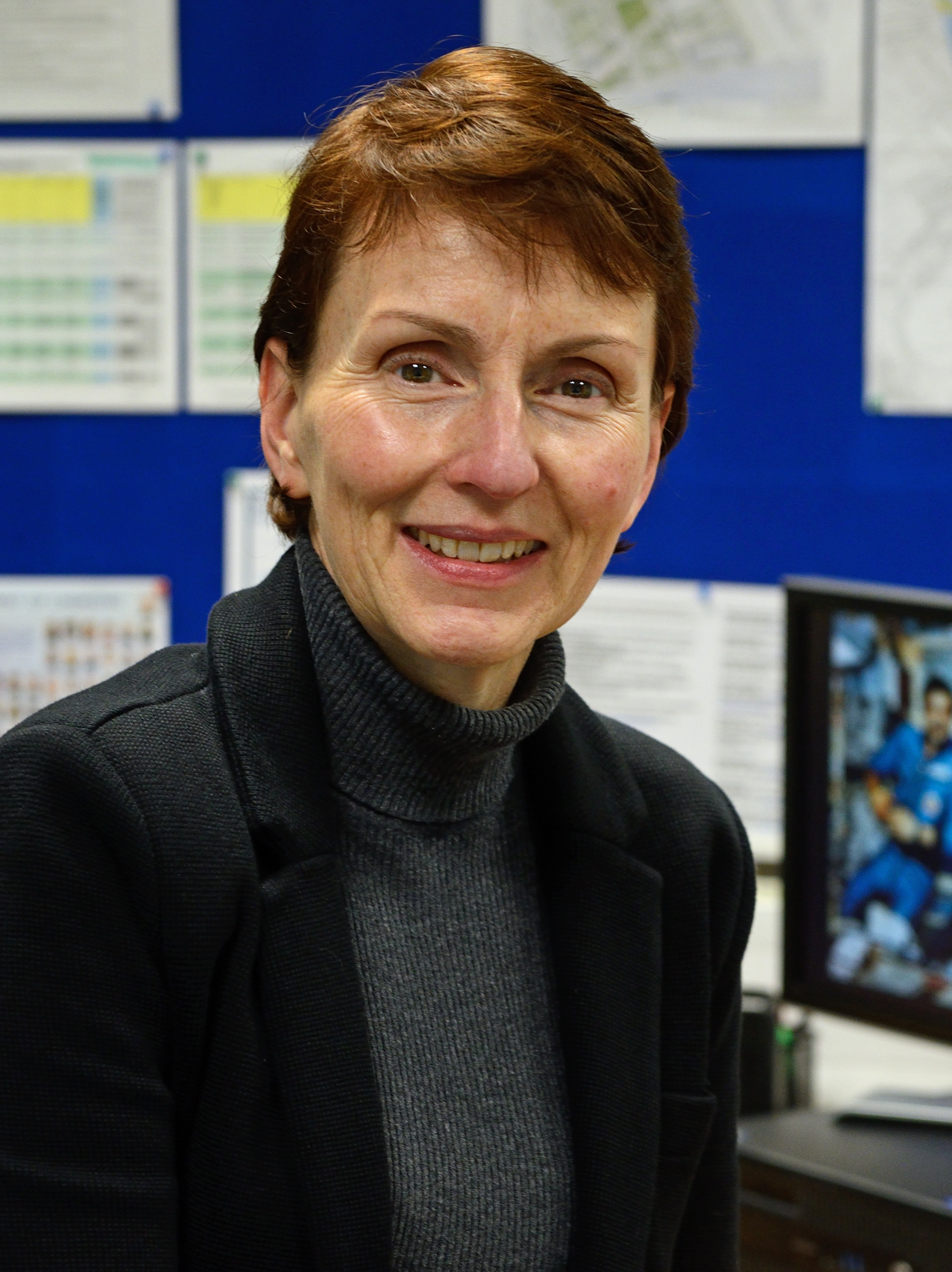
Helen Sharman, British Astronaut and first British person in space

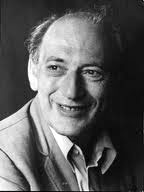
Henri Tajfel, social psychologist

Kitty Ussher, British economist and former politician who is the chief economist at the Institute of Directors

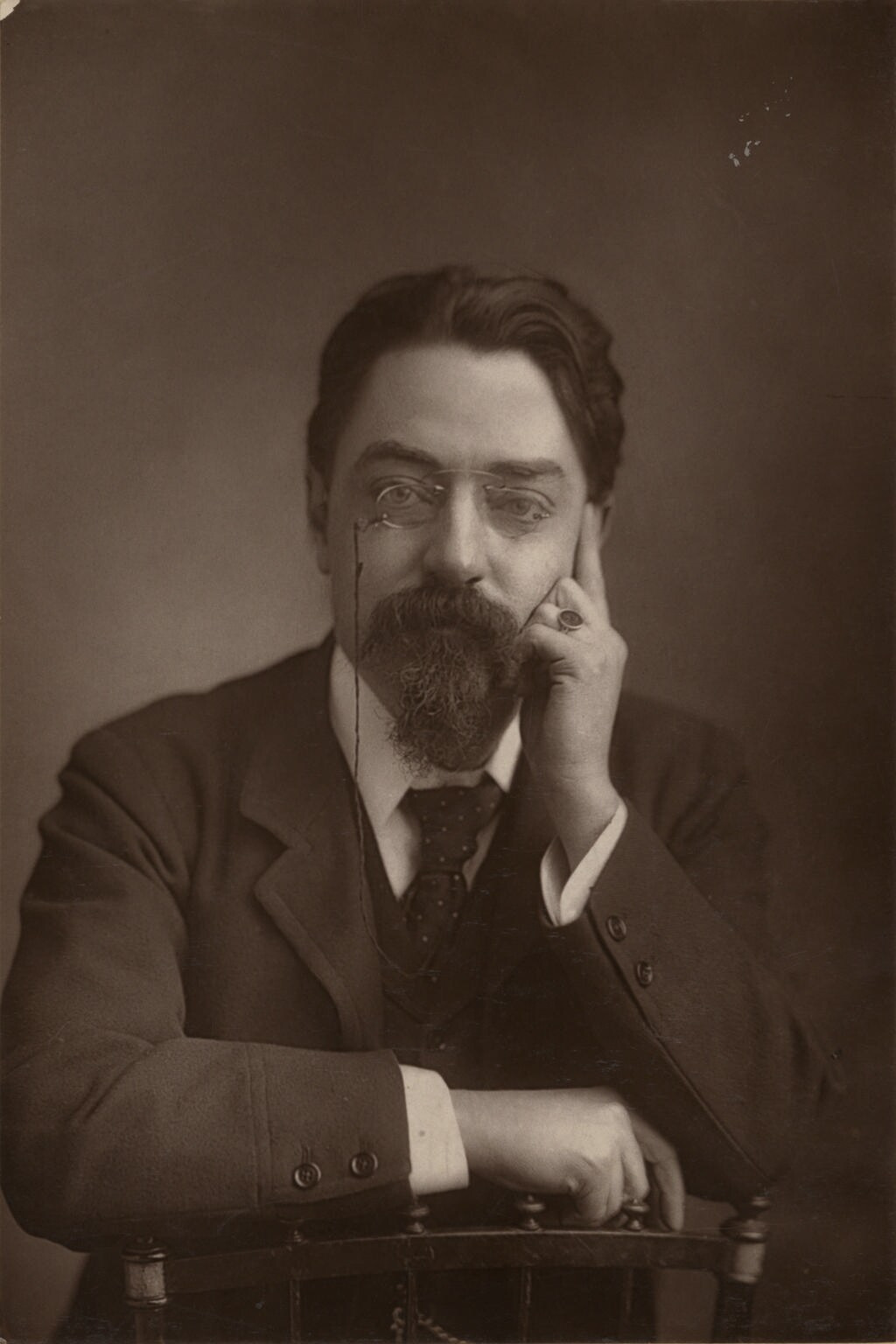
Sidney Webb, 1st Baron Passfield, economist and co-founder of the London School of Economics and Political Science

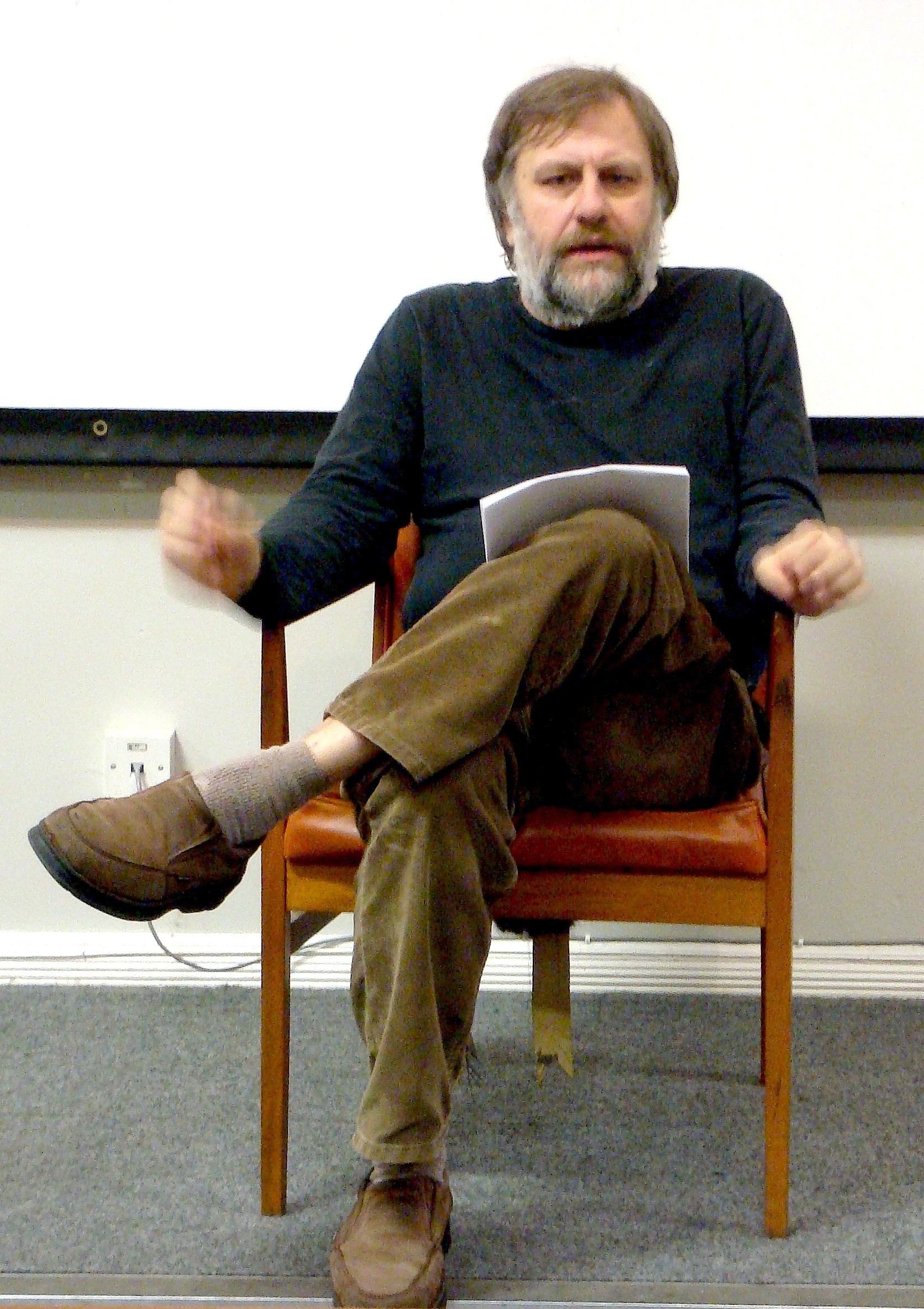
Slavoj Zizek, philosopher and International Director of the Birkbeck Institute for the Humanities

== See also ==
- Armorial of UK universities
- List of universities in the UK
- Ruskin College
