= Margaret of Holland, Countess of Henneberg =

Countess of Holland by birth and by marriage Countess of Henneberg

Margaret of Holland
- Born: 1234
- Died: 26 March 1276; Loosduinen
- Noble family: House of Holland
- Spouse: Herman I, Count of Henneberg
- Issue: Herman; Jutta; Poppo
- Father: Floris IV, Count of Holland
- Mother: Matilda of Brabant, Countess of Holland

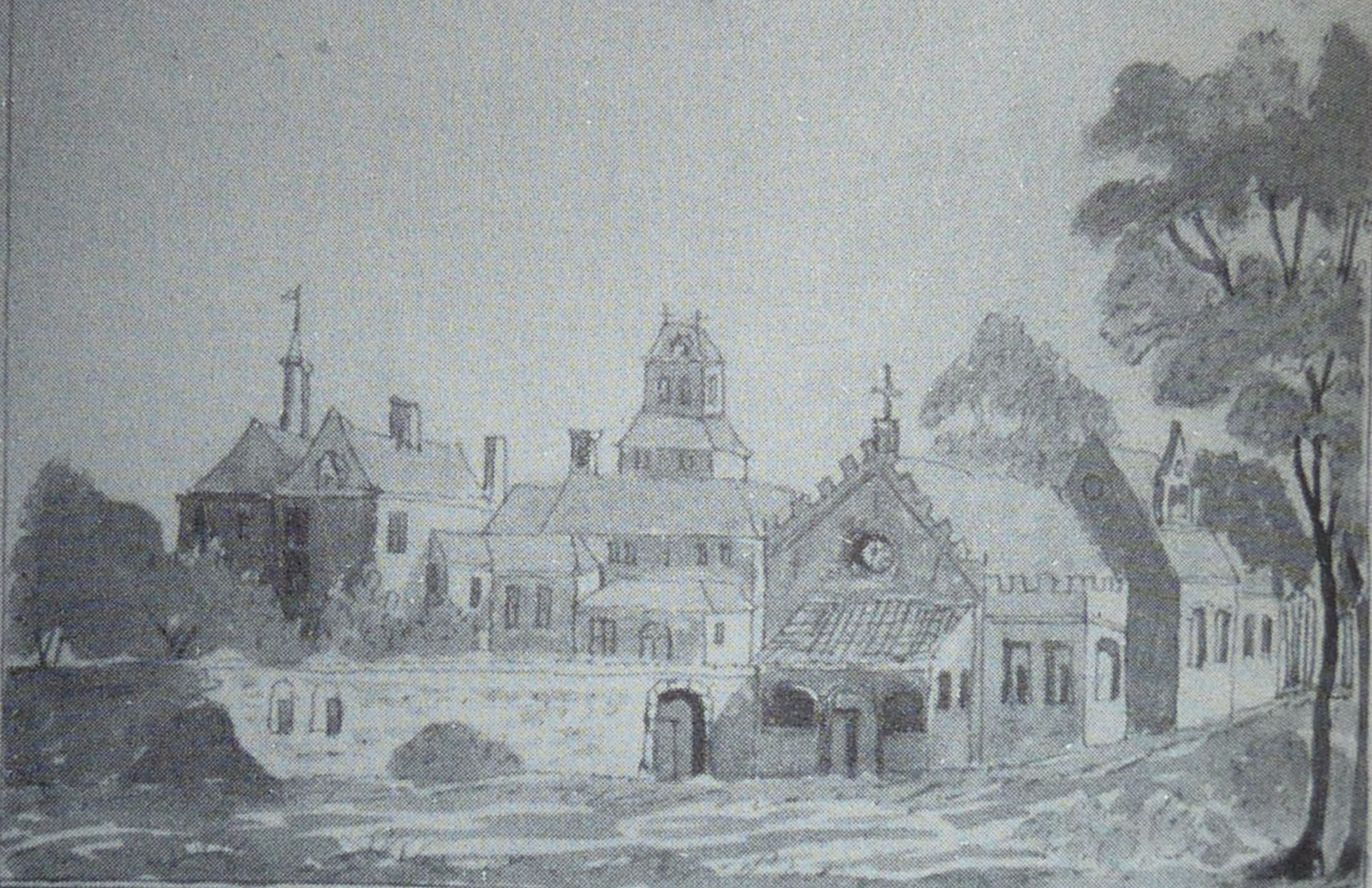
The castle of Henneberg family in Loosduinen

Margaret of Henneberg (1234 – 26 March 1276) was a Dutch countess, known for a famous medieval legend. She was a daughter of Count Floris IV of Holland and his wife, Matilda of Brabant.

== Life ==
Margaret married on Pentecost of 1249 to Count Herman I of Henneberg-Coburg. This marriage had political background, because Hermann had hoped to be elected King of the Germans earlier in 1246, but had lost to Margaret's brother William II. In an attempt to strengthen his influence in Germany, William had arranged a marriage between his sister and a German count.

Margaret of Henneberg and her husband lived in Coburg, although the couple also owned a residence in Loosduinen, where they frequently stayed. Their eldest son, Herman, was born in 1250 and died young. He was buried in the church of Loosduinen. Margaret and Herman had two children who reached adulthood:

- Jutta, married Margrave Otto V of Brandenburg-Salzwedel in 1268
- Poppo, died in 1291

In the spring of 1276, Margaret fell seriously ill in Loosduinen. Before her death she was able to dictate some letters about her inheritance to her nephew Floris V of Holland. She died on Good Friday of 1276 and, like her first son, she was buried in the church of the abbey of Loosduinen.

== The legend of the 365 children ==
From notes made by her widower, it is known that her death was unusual. Later, however, a legend was formed that she had died in childbirth after giving birth to no fewer than 365 children. An early form of this legend can be found in the 14th-century Tafel van Egmond, which can be found in the University Library of Utrecht. It briefly reports that she died after giving birth to 364 sons and daughters. The children did not survive. They were all buried together in Loosduinen, where an epitaph still exists.

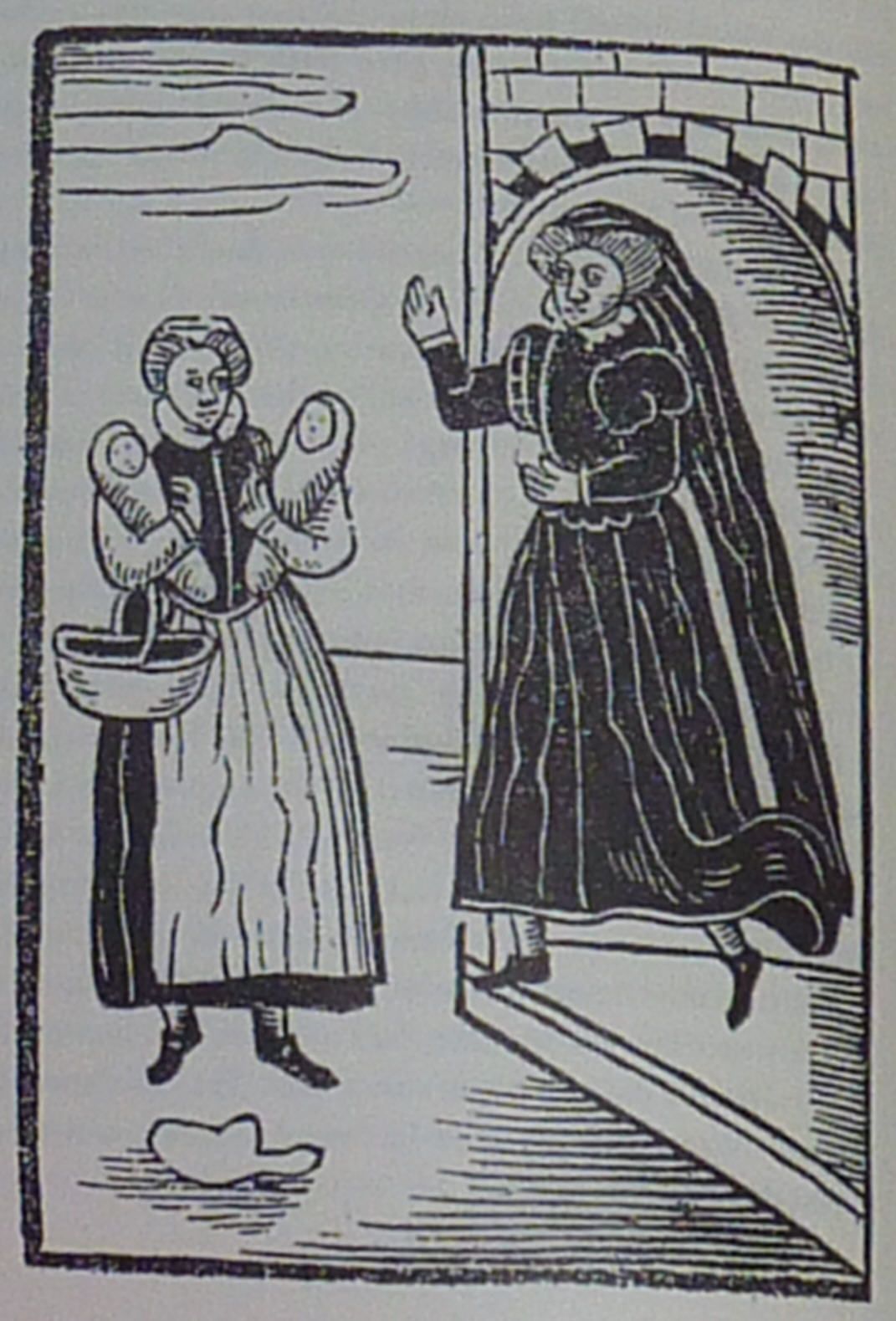
Margaret insults the beggar. Print from 1620.

Another 14th-century source is De Clerk's Kronyk van Holland. It gives a reason for the unusual multiple births. Margaret had on one occasion insulted a mother of twins with the assertion that these children would have to have two different fathers. As a punishment, she had been bewitched. The Kronyk mentions that 365 mouse-sized children were baptized in a large vessel and died afterwards.

Hermann Korner wrote his Chronica Novella between 1415 and 1535. Here, we find the legend in an embellished form. The mother of twins now has a name, Catherine, and is described as a personal enemy of Margaret, who is described as the wife of Count John of Holland. According to Korner, Margaret had said that it was just as impossible for Catherine to have two children at the same time from the same man, as it was impossible for Margaret herself to get as many children as there are days in the year. Simon, Catherine's husband, had thereupon rejected her and she was sent to prison, where she prayed passionately for her reputation to be cleared. Then Margaret had given birth to 364 children, and Simon had had second thoughts and re-acknowledged Catherine as his wife. The 364 children are described as tiny as crabs and as having died after baptism in a large vessel.

The story is also reported by Jan van Naaldwijk in his Croonijcke van Holland. In his version of the story, Herman of Henneberg was present at the birth and the baptism and he invited many nobles to act as godparents to his children. In this version of the story, the mother of the twins is a beggar. It has the additional details that the baptism was performed by Bishop Guido of Utrecht, and that all the boys were given the name of John, and all the girls were named Elizabeth.

In the 16th century, the legend spread more and more. Ludovico Guicciardini, who had probably visited Loosduinen, published a detailed account of what happened in 1567. Irenaeus in his book De Monstris, moved the event to the year 1555. Another writer relied on Jobus Fincelius when he gives the year of the miraculous birth as 1313 and stated Margaret was Irish.

In 1599, Cyriacus Spangenberg published his Hennebergische Chronica. It mentions 364 children, half of them boys baptized in the name of John, the other half girls who would be named Elizabeth. He refers to an inscription in the church in Loosduinen confirming the story. The copy of the Chronica that is preserved in Dresden has handwritten additional notes by the historian Nathaniel Carolus. According to these notes, some kind of monument for the deceased children existed in the church.

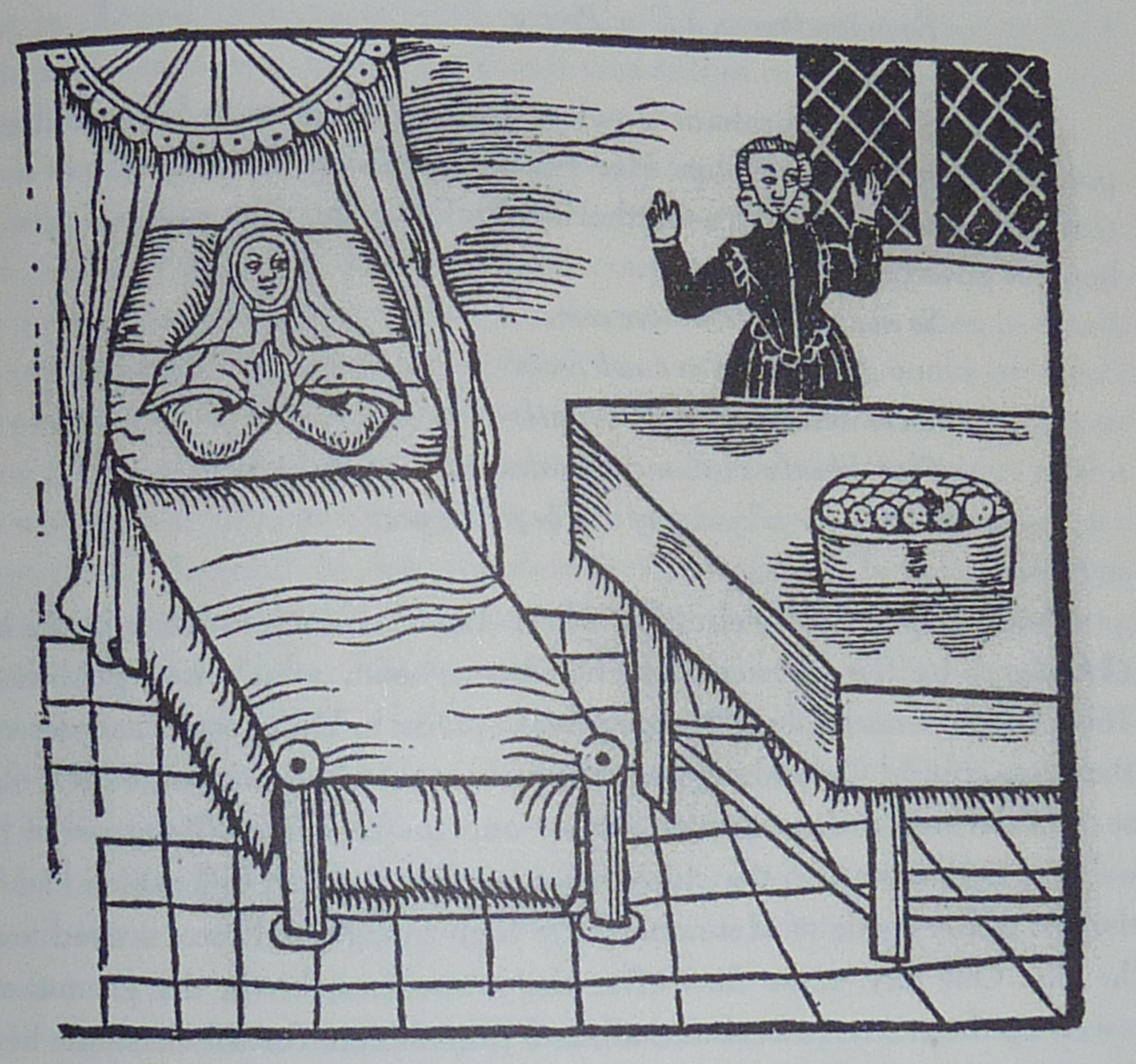
The childbirth and the children in the vessel. Print of 1620

In the late 16th century, the theme was taken up by a Spanish songwriter, who sang about the fate of madama Margarita and imputed her 360 children survived and their silver baptismal vessel was later exhibited in a church. The legend is also mentioned in Edward Grimeston's General History of the Netherlands of 1609, in Thomas Coryat's Crudities of 1611 and in John Stow's Annales. In 1620, the ballad the Lamenting Lady was printed in London; it probably used these sources. The theme also appears in William Strode's The Floating Island of 1639, in a poem by Robert Waring of 1651, in the works of Abraham Cowley, in Jacob Westerbaen's Ockenburgh of 1654 and in numerous other publications. The two versions with different numbers of children were often generously blended. Those writers who opt for the version with the 365 children were often curious about the gender of the 365th child, since it seemed to be clear that the genders had been evenly distributed. A clearly 17th century solution to this dilemma was to explain that the last child was a hermaphrodite.

The fascination of the crowds waned in the late 18th century and the legend came to be perceived as rather silly. Nevertheless travellers continued to visit Loosduinen.

== Loosduinen as a pilgrimage destination ==
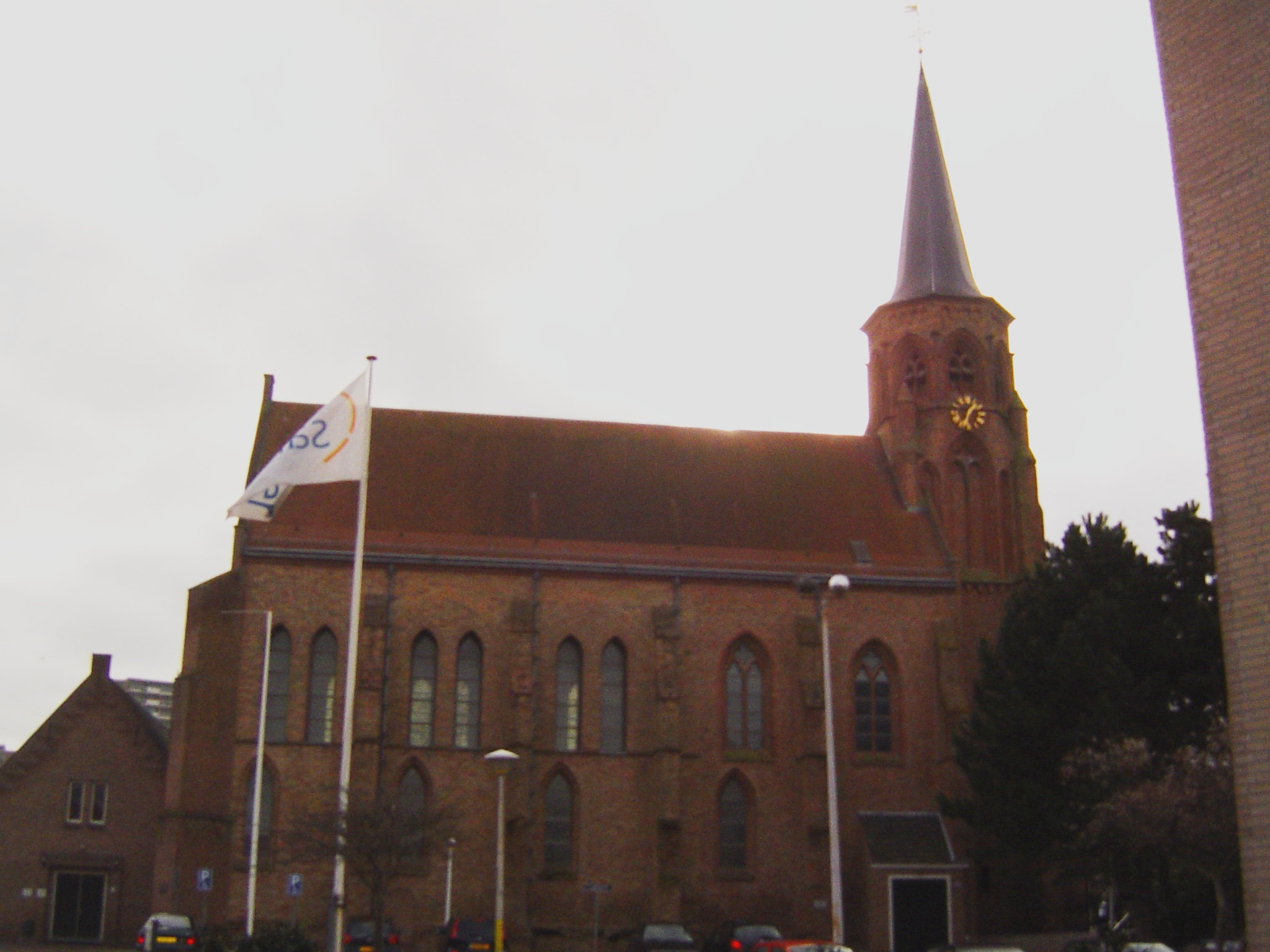
Abbey Church of Loosduinen

Wilhelmus of Heda confirmed, like Spangenberg had earlier, that there was a monument for the dead children in the church, and also that the vessel in which they had been baptized, was still on display there. This vessel gradually became a pilgrimage destination for childless women who hoped to become fertile if they washed their hands in it.

Incidentally, one result of the spread of the legend was that a castle in Poederoijen, which had 365 windows, was named arx puerorum.

The memorabilia in the church in Loosduinen were destroyed in the 1572, during the war between Philip II and William of Orange. But a few years later Jacobus Meursius acquired new devotional objects for the church, which had turned Protestant. He installed a bilingual plaque, in Latin and Dutch, which described the fate of Margaret and her 365 children, and in addition purchased two vessels in Delft to replace the lost baptismal vessel. Pilgrimages to Loosduinen could then be resumed.

== Representations in art ==
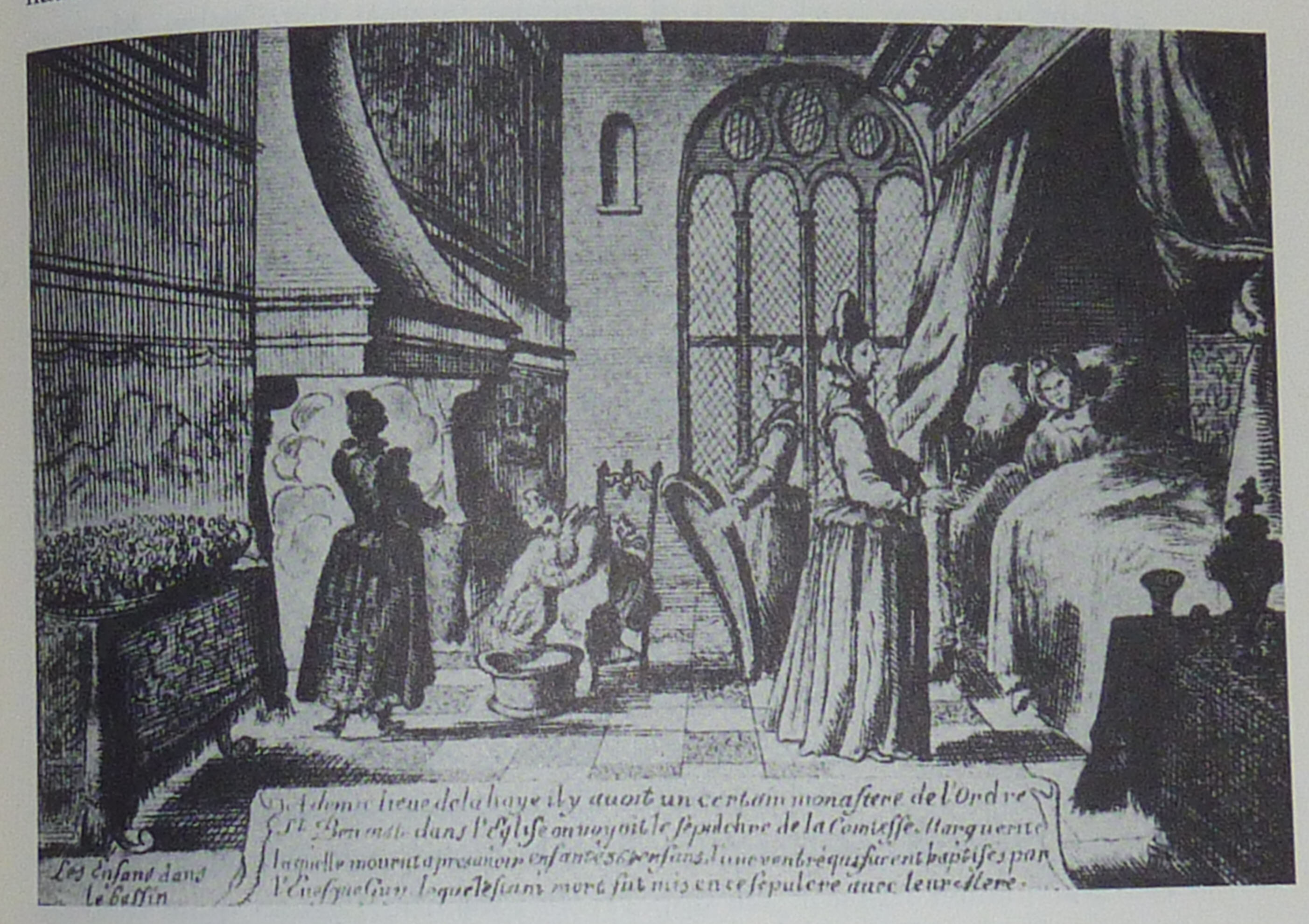
Margaret of Henneberg giving birth, French print from the 17th Century, after Pieter van den Keere

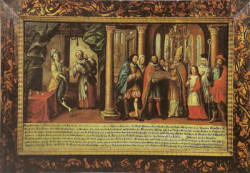
Painting by Michael Waginger, 1712

Representations of the legend have been shown outside the church. For example, in the guest house Het wapen van de Prins van Oranje ("the coat of arms of the Prince of Orange"), a picture by Pieter van den Keere, showing Margaret of Henneberg giving birth, was on display. This painting was also commonly printed in the 17th century and is now in the abbey church of Loosduinen. It shows a kind of chest with drawers on the left, on which there is a bowl with many children, and a smoking chimney. In the center, midwives are busy with bed sheets and hot water; on the right in the bed, the mother is shown.

Another early illustration of Margaret's fate can be found in the chapel of Thierberg Castle in Kufstein. It was painted by Michael Waginger and shows both the insult of the beggar and the baptism of many small children.

== Tourism ==
By the 17th century, many travellers, especially from England, visited Loosduinen. Among them were John Evelyn, James Howell, Samuel Pepys, Mathias Poulsen, John Rawlinson, and Maximilien Misson. According to their testimony, there was no monument for Margaret in the church at the time, only an inscription and the two baptismal vessels.

== The child in the glass jar ==
The earlier legend states that the children had been buried in the abbey church. In the 16th century, a story spread that they had been preserved as a curiosity. Battista Fregoso, for example, asserted in 1565 that they were kept in a glass jar and that Emperor Charles V had picked up the bottle for closer examination. When Jean François Regnard visited Copenhagen in 1681, he was shown one of Margaret's children, which was kept in the curiosa cabinet in King Frederick III's art collection. Allegedly, Hannibal Sehested had bought this jar in Belgium and given it to the king. Holger Jacobson, who created a catalog of the King's collection, agrees with this origin. An anonymous book entitled Description of Holland of 1741 pointed out that the fetus in the jar looked like the result of a miscarriage or an abortion. The thumb-sized baby was transferred to the Natural History Museum in Copenhagen when the royal art collection was dissolved on 26 December 1826 and has since disappeared without a trace.

== Medical theories ==
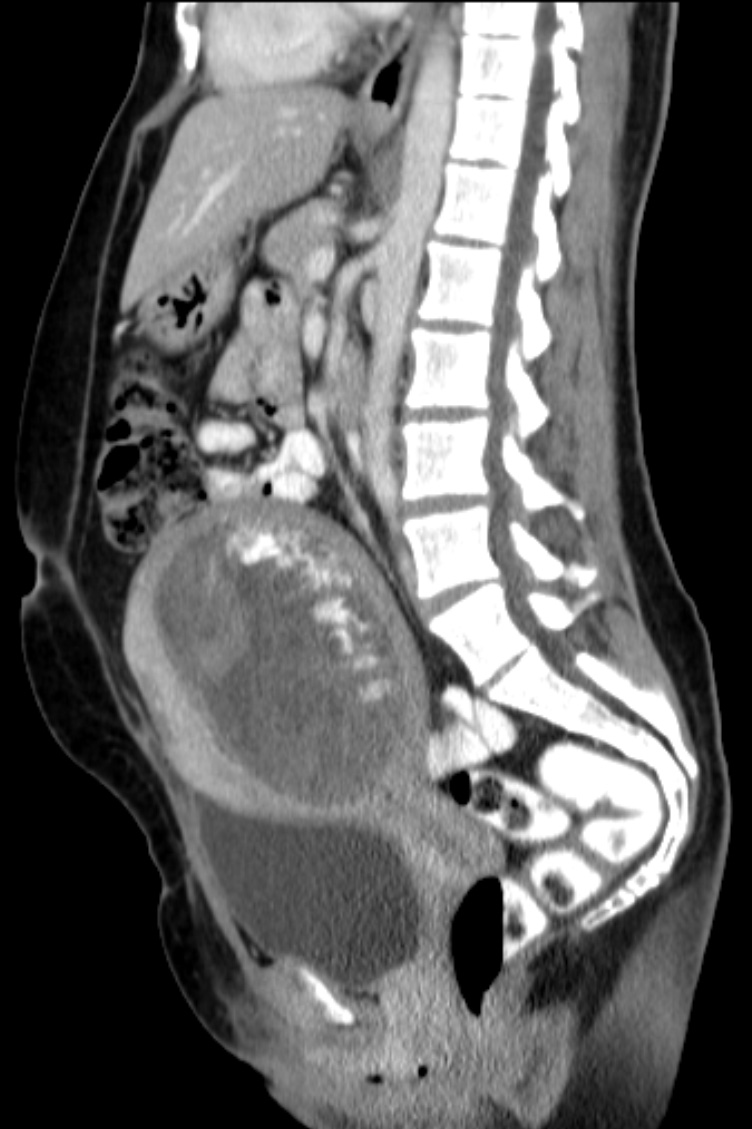
Hydatidiform mole, sagittal view

Physicians have been increasingly skeptical about the legend of Margaret of Henneberg and her multiple birth. One of the last physicians to hold that the story could be true, was John Maubray, who was fiercely derided for this view in 1726.

Physicians lost interest in the case until the 1930s, when gynecologists Dr. Schumann and Dr. Brews, apparently independently, published the theory that it could have been a case of hydatidiform mole. Ejected cysts would have been mistaken for children.

Another explanation was proposed by the Frenchman Struyk in 1758 in the journal Journal des scavans: In Margaret's time, the new year began on 25 March. So if Margaret gave birth to twins on 26 March the number of children would have been equal to the number of days in the (new) year. This theory, that she gave birth to twins named John and Elizabeth, has been repeated many times.
