= Mary Toft =

English medical hoaxer (1703–1763)

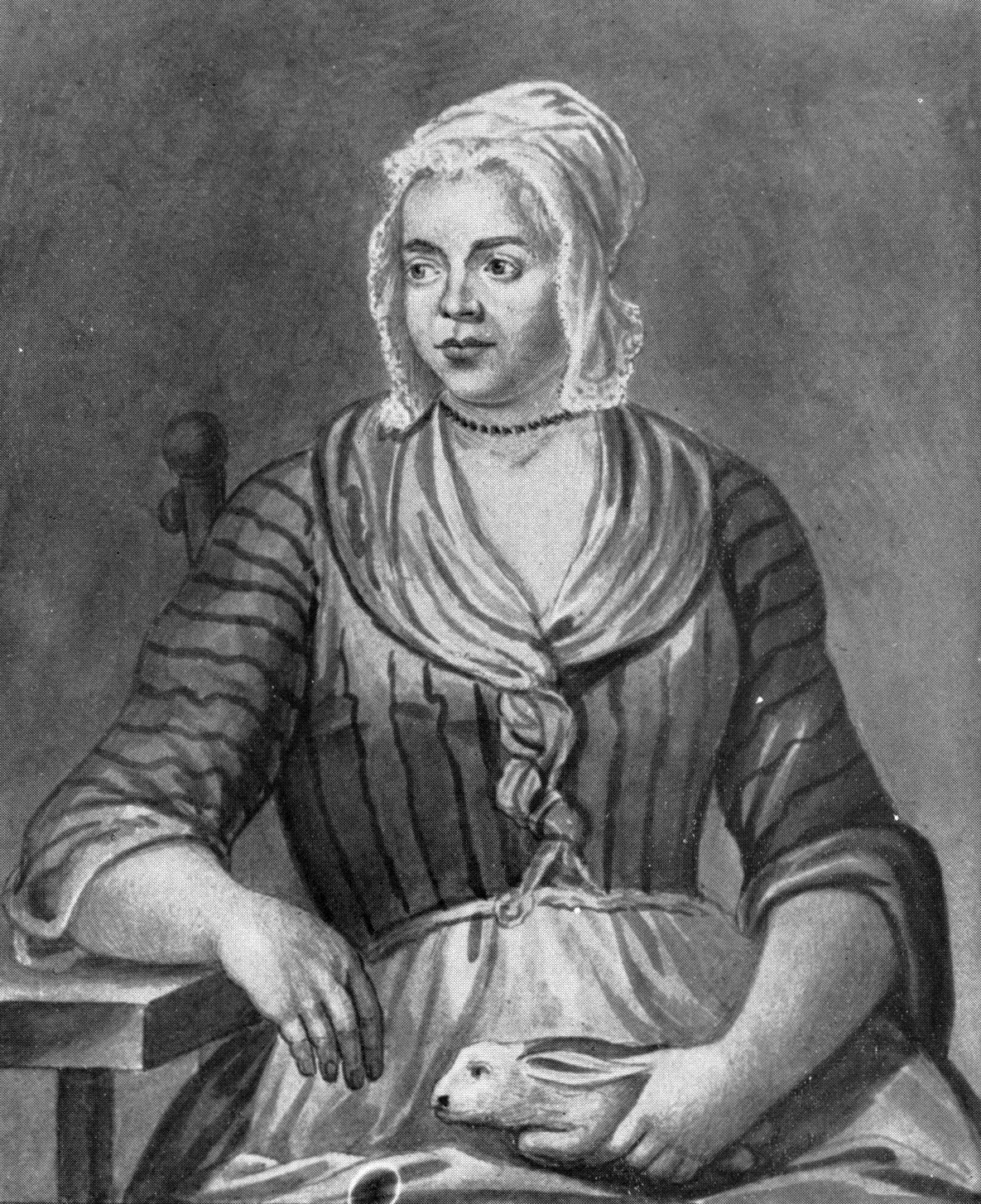
- Born: Mary Denyer
- Baptised: 21 February 1703
- Died: January 1763
- Known for: Medical hoax

Mary Toft (née Denyer; baptised 21 February 1703 – January 1763), also spelled Tofts, was an English woman from Godalming, Surrey, who in 1726 became the subject of considerable controversy when she tricked doctors into believing that she had given birth to rabbits.

In 1726 Toft became pregnant, but following her reported fascination with the sighting of a rabbit, she miscarried. Her claim to have given birth to various animal parts prompted the arrival of John Howard, a local surgeon, who investigated the matter. He delivered several pieces of animal flesh and duly notified other prominent physicians, which brought the case to the attention of Nathaniel St. André, surgeon to the Royal Household of King George I. St. André concluded that Toft's case was genuine but the king also sent surgeon Cyriacus Ahlers, who remained sceptical. By then quite famous, Toft was brought to London where she was studied in detail; under intense scrutiny and producing no more rabbits she confessed to the hoax, which was put upon by her family, and was subsequently imprisoned as a fraud.

The resultant public mockery created panic within the medical profession and ruined the careers of several prominent surgeons. The affair was satirised on many occasions, not least by the pictorial satirist and social critic William Hogarth, who was notably critical of the medical profession's gullibility. Toft was eventually released without charge and returned home. The scandal had a lasting effect on public trust in the medical field, contributing to widespread scepticism about the competence and ethics of physicians during that era.

== Account ==
The story first came to the public's attention in late October 1726, when reports began to reach London. An account appeared in the Mist's Weekly Journal, on 19 November 1726:

From Guildford comes a strange but well-attested Piece of News. That a poor Woman who lives at Godalmin [sic], near that Town, was about a Month past delivered by Mr John Howard, an Eminent Surgeon and Man-Midwife, of a creature resembling a Rabbit but whose Heart and Lungs grew without [outside] its Belly, about 14 Days since she was delivered by the same Person, of a perfect Rabbit: and in a few Days after of 4 more; and on Friday, Saturday, Sunday, the 4th, 5th, and 6th instant, of one in each day: in all nine, they died all in bringing into the World. The woman hath made Oath, that two Months ago, being working in a Field with other Women, they put up a Rabbit, who running from them, they pursued it, but to no Purpose: This created in her such a Longing to it, that she (being with Child) was taken ill and miscarried, and from that Time she hath not been able to avoid thinking of Rabbits. People after all, differ much in their Opinion about this Matter, some looking upon them as great Curiosities, fit to be presented to the Royal Society, etc. others are angry at the Account, and say, that if it be a Fact, a Veil should be drawn over it, as an Imperfection in human Nature.

— Weekly Journal, 19 November 1726

The 'poor Woman', Mary Toft, was twenty-four or twenty-five years old. She was baptised Mary Denyer on 21 February 1703, the daughter of John and Jane Denyer. In 1720 she married Joshua Toft, a journeyman clothier and together the couple had three children, Mary, Anne and James. As an 18th-century English peasant, circumstances dictated that when in 1726 Toft again became pregnant, she continued working in the fields. She complained of painful complications early in the pregnancy and in early August egested several pieces of flesh, one "as big as my arm". This may have been the result of an abnormality of the developing placenta, which would have caused the embryo to stop developing and blood clots and flesh to be ejected. Toft went into labour on 27 September. Her neighbour was called and watched as she produced several animal parts. This neighbour then showed the pieces to her mother and to her mother-in-law, Ann Toft, who in contemporary accounts of the affair is named as a local midwife despite not being officially listed as one in the parish register or the list of women who received a Bishop’s license It is possible that Ann, who had twelve children, unofficially assisted local poorer women with childbirth on the basis of her knowledge and experiences. Ann Toft sent the flesh to John Howard, a Guildford-based man-midwife of thirty years' experience.

Initially, Howard dismissed the notion that Toft had given birth to animal parts, but the next day, despite his reservations, he went to see her. Ann Toft showed him more pieces of the previous night's exertions, but on examining Mary, he found nothing. When Mary again went into labour, appearing to give birth to several more animal parts, Howard returned to continue his investigations. According to a contemporary account of 9 November, over the next few days he delivered "three legs of a Cat of a Tabby Colour, and one leg of a Rabbet: the guts were as a Cat's and in them were three pieces of the Back-Bone of an Eel ... The cat's feet supposed were formed in her imagination from a cat she was fond of that slept on the bed at night." Toft seemingly became ill once more and over the next few days delivered more pieces of rabbit.

As the story became more widely known, on 4 November Henry Davenant, a member of the court of King George I, went to see for himself what was happening. He examined the samples Howard had collected and returned to London, ostensibly a believer. Howard had Toft moved to Guildford, where he offered to deliver rabbits in the presence of anyone who doubted her story. Some of the letters he wrote to Davenant to notify him of any progress in the case came to the attention of Nathaniel St. André, since 1723 a Swiss surgeon to the Royal Household. St. André would ultimately detail the contents of one of these letters in his pamphlet, A short narrative of an extraordinary delivery of rabbets (1727):

SIR,

Since I wrote to you, I have taken or deliver'd the poor Woman of three more Rabbets, all three half grown, one of them a dunn Rabbet; the last leap'd twenty three Hours in the Uterus before it dy'd. As soon as the eleventh Rabbet was taken away, up leap'd the twelfth Rabbet, which is now leaping. If you have any curious Person that is pleased to come Post, may see another leap in her Uterus, and shall take it from her if he pleases; which will be a great Satisfaction to the Curious: If she had been with Child, she has but ten Days more to go, so I do not know how many Rabbets may be behind; I have brought the Woman to Guildford for better Convenience.

I am, SIR, Your humble Servant,

JOHN HOWARD.

== Investigation ==
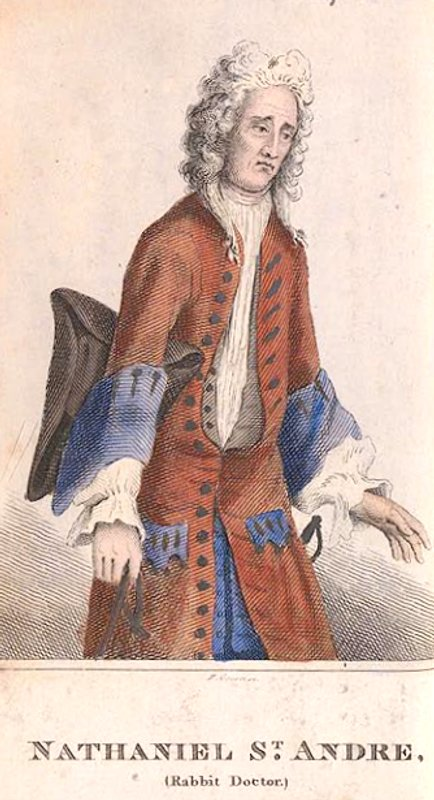
A coloured engraving of Nathaniel St. André

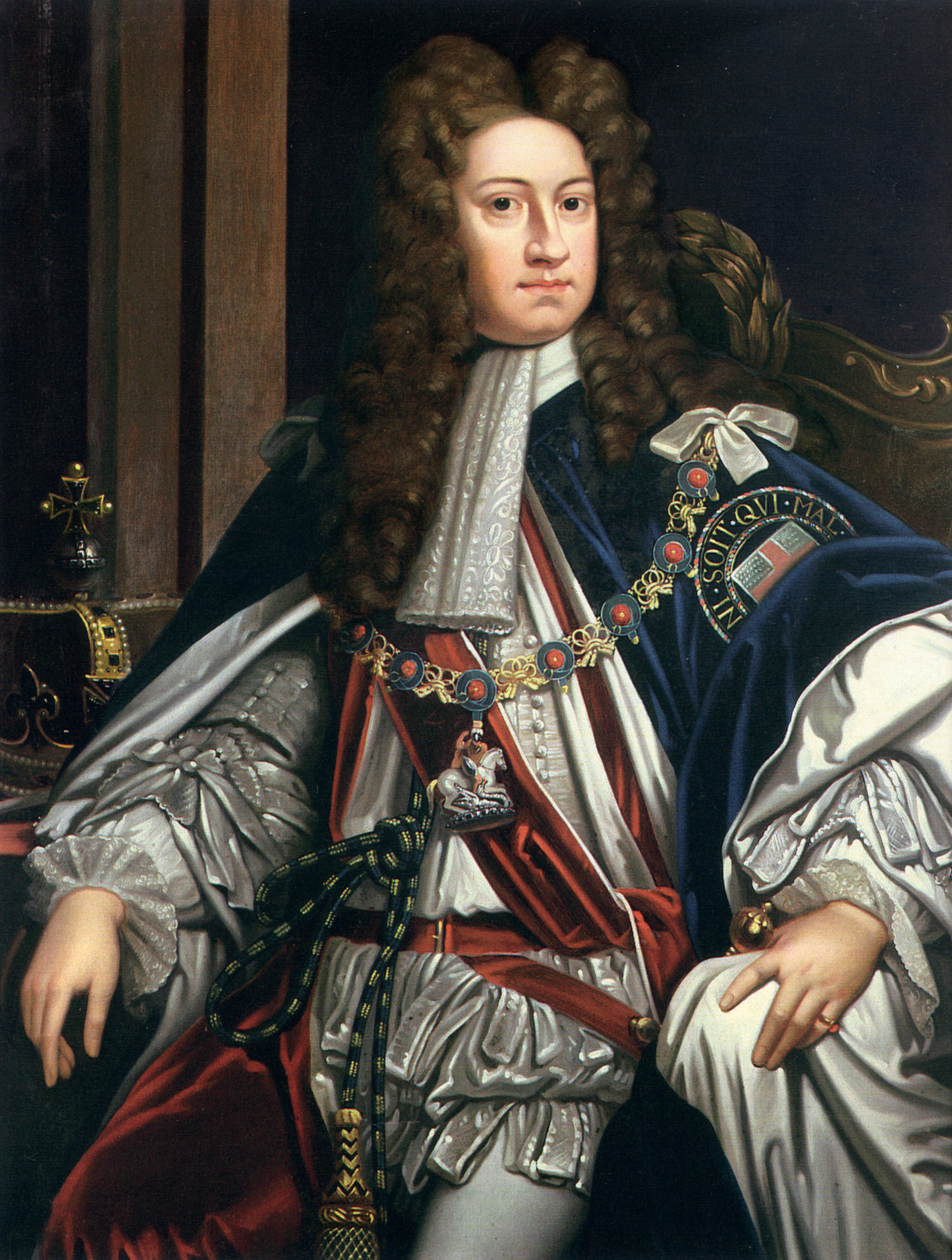
King George I was fascinated by the case.

By the middle of November the British royal family were so interested in the story that they sent St. André and Samuel Molyneux, secretary to the Prince of Wales, to investigate. Apparently, they were not disappointed; arriving on 15 November they were taken by Howard to see Toft, who within hours delivered a rabbit's torso. St. André's account details his examination of the rabbit. To check if it had breathed air, he placed a piece of its lung in water to see if it would float—which it did. St. André then performed a medical examination on Toft, and concluded that the rabbits were bred in her fallopian tubes.

In the doctors' absence, Toft later that day reportedly delivered the torso of another rabbit, which the two also examined. They again returned that evening to find Toft again displaying violent contractions. A further medical examination followed, and St. André delivered some rabbit skin, followed a few minutes later by a rabbit's head. Both men inspected the egested pieces of flesh, noting that some resembled the body parts of a cat.

Fascinated, the king then sent surgeon Cyriacus Ahlers to Guildford. Ahlers arrived on 20 November and found Toft exhibiting no signs of pregnancy. He may have already suspected the affair was a hoax and observed that Toft seemed to press her knees and thighs together, as if to prevent something from "dropping down". He thought Howard's behaviour just as suspicious, as the man-midwife would not let him help deliver the rabbits—although Ahlers was not a man-midwife and in an earlier attempt had apparently put Toft through considerable pain. Convinced the affair was a hoax, he lied, telling those involved that he believed Toft's story, before making his excuses and returning to London, taking specimens of the rabbits with him. Upon closer study, he reportedly found evidence of them having been cut with a man-made instrument, and noted pieces of straw and grain in their droppings.

On 21 November Ahlers reported his findings to the king and later to "several Persons of Note and Distinction". Howard wrote to Ahlers the next day, asking for the return of his specimens. Ahlers' suspicions began to worry both Howard and St. André, and apparently the king, as two days later St. André and a colleague were ordered back to Guildford. Upon their arrival they met Howard, who told St. André that Toft had given birth to two more rabbits. She delivered several portions of what was presumed to be a placenta but she was by then quite ill, and suffering from a constant pain in the right side of her abdomen.

In a pre-emptive move against Ahlers, St. André collected affidavits from several witnesses, which in effect cast doubt on Ahlers' honesty, and on 26 November gave an anatomical demonstration before the king to support Toft's story. According to his pamphlet, neither St. André nor Molyneux suspected any fraudulent activity.

St. André was ordered by the king to travel back to Guildford and to bring Toft to London, so that further investigations could be carried out. He was accompanied by Richard Manningham, a well-known obstetrician who was knighted in 1721, and the second son of Thomas Manningham, Bishop of Chichester. He examined Toft and found the right side of her abdomen slightly enlarged. Manningham also delivered what he thought was a hog's bladder—although St. André and Howard disagreed with his identification—but became suspicious as it smelled of urine. Nevertheless, those involved agreed to say nothing in public and on their return to London on 29 November lodged Toft in Lacey's Bagnio, in Leicester Fields.

== Examination ==
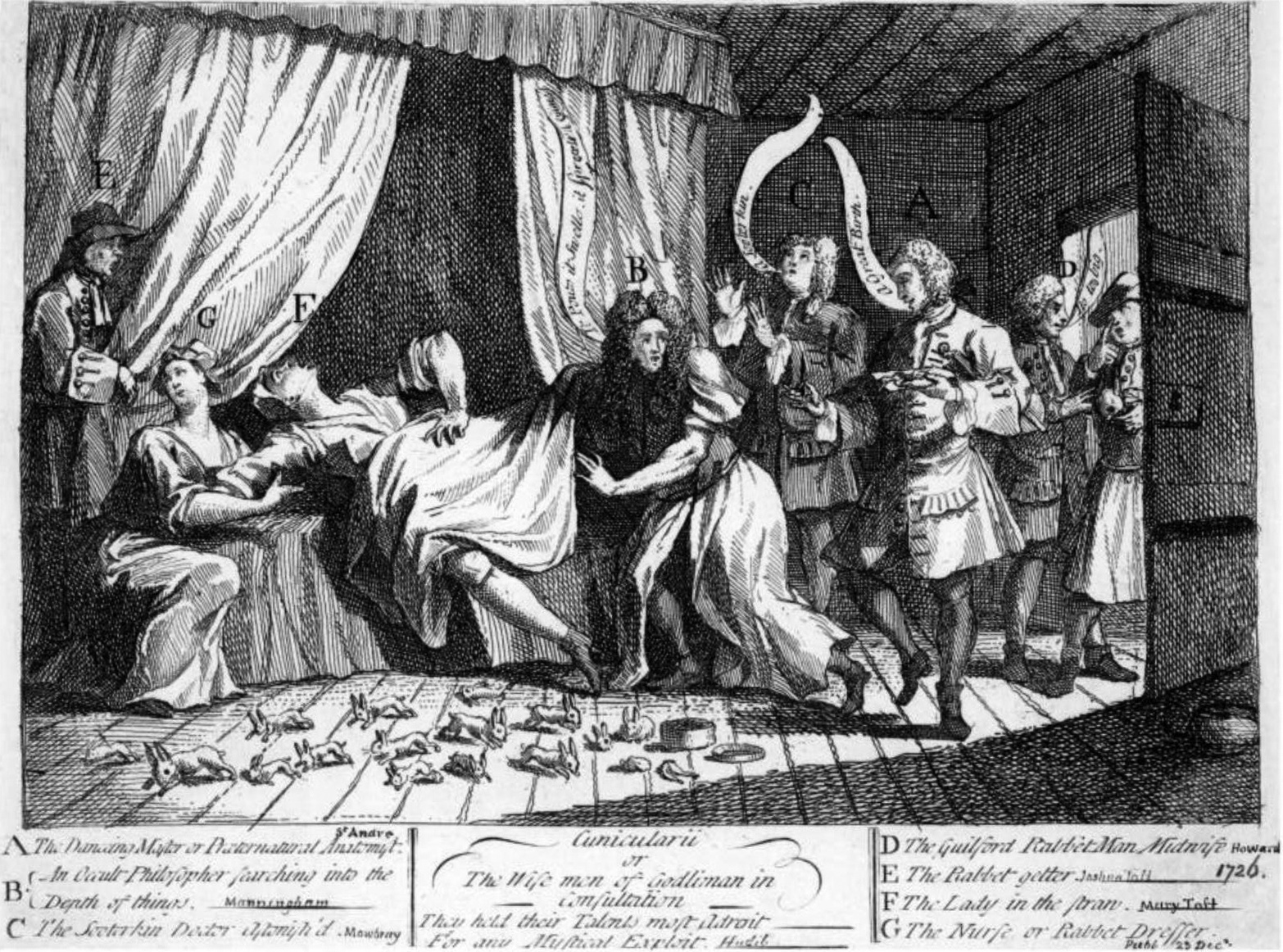
Hogarth's Cunicularii, or The Wise Men of Godliman in Consultation (1726). St. André described Toft (F) as possessing a "healthy strong constitution, of a small size, and fair complexion; of a very stupid and sullen temper: she can neither write nor read", and her husband (E) as "a poor Journey-man Clothier at Godlyman, by whom she has had three children". Many baby rabbits can be seen on the floor.

Printed in the early days of newspapers, the story became a national sensation, although some publications were sceptical, the Norwich Gazette viewing the affair simply as female gossip. Rabbit stew and jugged hare disappeared from the dinner table, while as unlikely as the story sounded, many physicians felt compelled to see Toft for themselves. The political writer John Hervey later told his friend Henry Fox that:

Every creature in town, both men and women, have been to see and feel her: the perpetual emotions, noises and rumblings in her Belly are something prodigious; all the eminent physicians, surgeons and man-midwives in London are there Day and Night to watch her next production.

— John Hervey, 2nd Baron Hervey,

Under St. André's strict control, Toft was studied by a number of eminent physicians and surgeons, including John Maubray. In The Female Physician Maubray had proposed women could give birth to a creature he named a sooterkin. He was a proponent of maternal impression, a widely held belief that conception and pregnancy could be influenced by what the mother dreamt, or saw, and warned pregnant women that over-familiarity with household pets could cause their children to resemble those pets. He was reportedly happy to attend Toft, pleased that her case appeared to vindicate his theories, but man-midwife James Douglas, like Manningham, presumed that the affair was a hoax and despite St. André's repeated invitations, kept his distance.

Douglas was one of the country's most respected anatomists and a well-known man-midwife, whereas St. André was often considered to be a member of the court only because of his ability to speak the king's native German. St. André therefore desperately wanted the two to attend Toft; after George I's accession to the throne the Whigs had become the dominant political faction, and Manningham and Douglas's Whig affiliations and medical knowledge might have elevated his status as both doctor and philosopher. Douglas thought that a woman giving birth to rabbits was as likely as a rabbit giving birth to a human child, but despite his scepticism he went to see her. When Manningham informed him of the suspected hog's bladder, and after he examined Toft, he refused to engage St. André on the matter:

To be able to determine, to the Satisfaction and Conviction of all sorts of Persons, other Arguments were necessary, than Anatomy, or any other Branch of Physick [sic], could furnish. Of these the greatest Number are not Judges. It was therefore undoubtedly very natural for me to desire that People would suspend any farther Judgement for a little Time, till such Proofs could be brought of the Imposture as they requir'd.

— James Douglas

Under constant supervision, Toft went into labour several times, to no avail.

== Confession ==
The hoax was uncovered less than a week later on 4 December. Thomas Onslow, 2nd Baron Onslow, had begun an investigation of his own and discovered that for the past month Toft's husband, Joshua, had been buying young rabbits. Convinced he had enough evidence to proceed, in a letter to physician Sir Hans Sloane he wrote that the affair had "almost alarmed England" and that he would soon publish his findings. The same day, Thomas Howard, a porter at the bagnio, confessed to Justice of the Peace Sir Thomas Clarges that he had been bribed by Toft's sister-in-law, Margaret, to sneak a rabbit into Toft's chamber. When arrested and questioned Mary denied the accusation, while Margaret, under Douglas's interrogation, claimed that she had obtained the rabbit for eating only.

I told my sister of my having sent for a rabbit and I desire[d] her to give it to the porter to be carryed away which my sister did saying she would not have it known for 1000 p[oun]d[s].

— Mary Toft

Manningham examined Toft and thought something remained in the cavity of her uterus, and so he successfully persuaded Clarges to allow her to remain at the bagnio. Douglas, who had by then visited Toft, questioned her on three or four occasions, each time for several hours. After several days of this Manningham threatened to perform a painful operation on her, and on 7 December, in the presence of Manningham, Douglas, John Montagu and Frederick Calvert, Toft finally confessed. Following her miscarriage and while her cervix permitted access, an accomplice had inserted into her womb the claws and body of a cat, and the head of a rabbit. They had also invented a story in which Toft claimed that during her pregnancy and while working in a field, she had been startled by a rabbit, and had since become obsessed with rabbits. For later parturitions, animal parts had been inserted into her vagina.

Pressured again by Manningham and Douglas (it was the latter who took her confession), she made a further admission on 8 December and another on 9 December, before being sent to Tothill Fields Bridewell, charged on a statute of Edward III as a "vile cheat and impostor". In her earlier, unpublished confessions, she blamed the entire affair on a range of other participants, from her mother-in-law to John Howard. She also claimed that a travelling woman told her how to insert the rabbits into her body, and how such a scheme would ensure that she would "never want as long as I liv'd". The British Journal reported that on 7 January 1727 she appeared at the Courts of Quarter Sessions at Westminster, charged "for being an abominable cheat and imposter in pretending to be delivered of several monstrous births". Margaret Toft had remained staunch, and refused to comment further. Mist's Weekly Journal of 24 December 1726 reported that "the nurse has been examined as to the person's concerned with her, but either was kept in the dark as to the imposition, or is not willing to disclose what she knows; for nothing can be got from her; so that her resolution shocks others."

== Aftermath ==
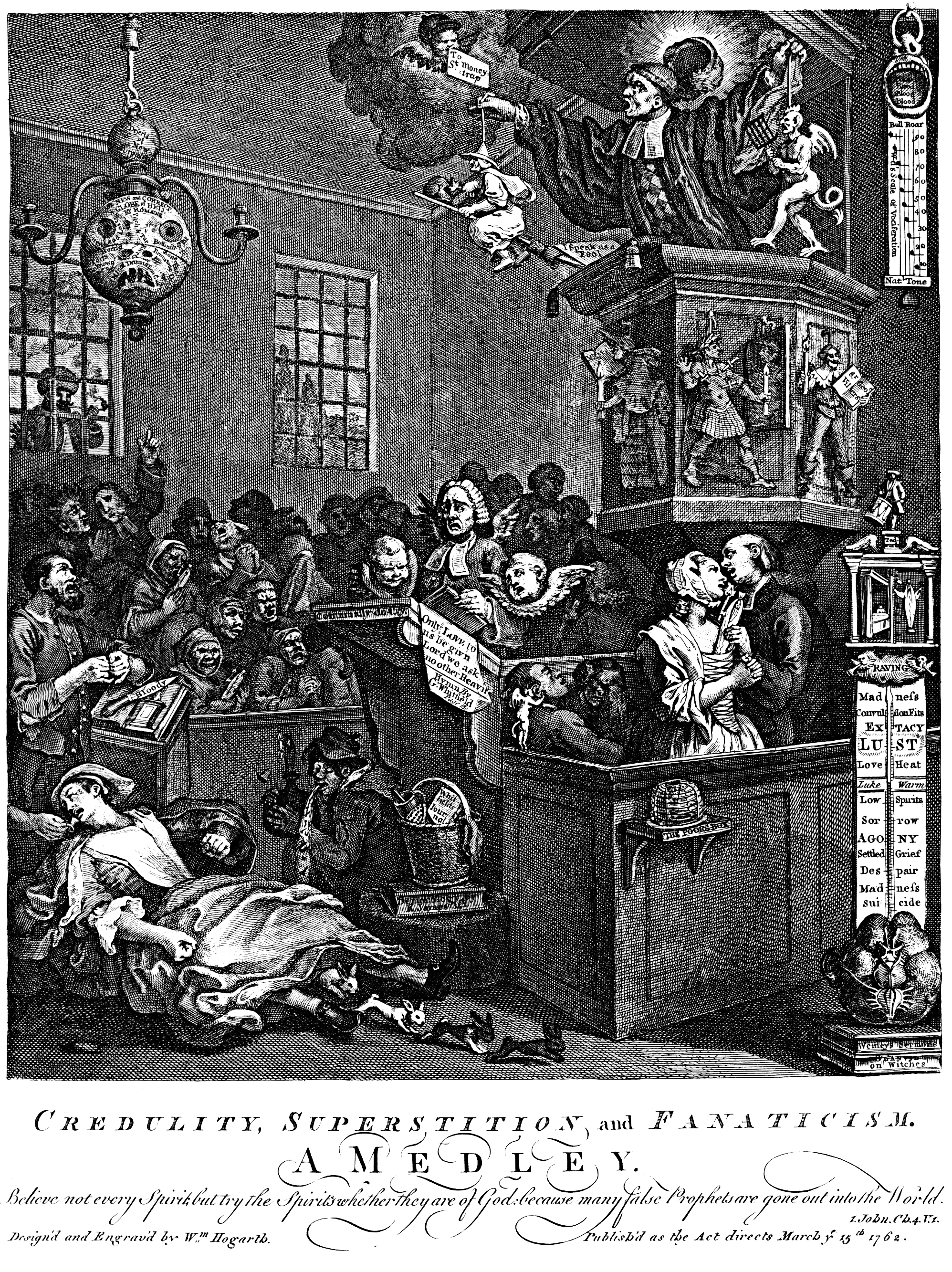
Hogarth's Credulity, Superstition, and Fanaticism, published in 1762, ridiculed secular and religious credulity.

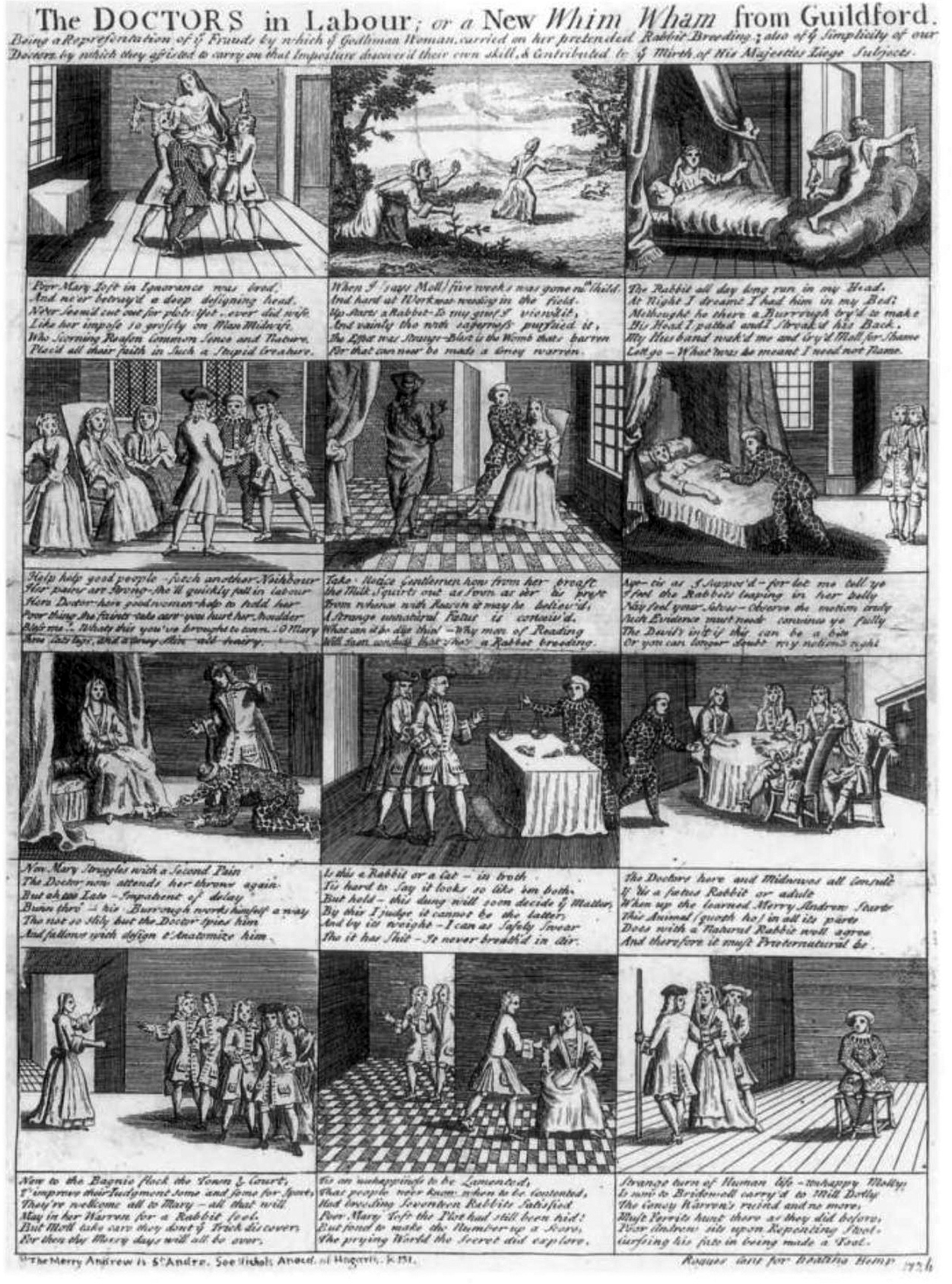
A contemporary popular broadsheet satirised St. André, showing him dressed as a court jester.

=== Mary Toft's later life ===
On 7 January 1727 John Howard and Mary Toft appeared before the bench, where Howard was fined £800 (£141,023 today). He returned to Surrey and continued his practice, and died in 1755.

Crowds reportedly mobbed Tothill Fields Bridewell for months, hoping to catch a glimpse of the now infamous Toft. By this time she had become quite ill, and while incarcerated had her portrait drawn by John Laguerre. She was ultimately discharged on 8 April 1727, as it was unclear as to what charge should have been made against her. The Toft family made no profit from the affair, and Mary Toft returned to Surrey. In February 1728 (recorded as 1727 Old Style), she gave birth to a daughter, Elizabeth, noted in the Godalming parish register as her "first child after her pretended Rabett-breeding." Little is known of Toft's later life. She briefly reappeared in 1740 when she was imprisoned for receiving stolen goods. She died in 1763, and her obituary ran in London newspapers alongside those of aristocrats. She was buried in Godalming on 13 January 1763.

=== Impact on the medical profession ===
Following the hoax, the medical profession's gullibility became the target of a great deal of public mockery. William Hogarth published Cunicularii, or The Wise Men of Godliman in Consultation (1726), which portrays Toft in the throes of labour, surrounded by the tale's chief participants. Figure "F" is Toft, "E" is her husband. "A" is St. André, and "D" is Howard. In Dennis Todd's Three Characters in Hogarth's Cunicularii and Some Implications the author concludes that figure "G" is Mary Toft's sister-in-law, Margaret Toft. Toft's confession of 7 December demonstrates her insistence that her sister-in-law played no part in the hoax, but Manningham's 1726 An Exact Diary of what was observ'd during a Close Attendance upon Mary Toft, the pretended Rabbet-Breeder of Godalming in Surrey offers eyewitness testimony of her complicity. Hogarth's print was not the only image that ridiculed the affair—George Vertue published The Surrey-Wonder, and The Doctors in Labour, or a New Wim-Wam in Guildford (12 plates), a broadsheet published in 1727 which satirises St. André, was also popular at the time.

The timing of Toft's confession proved awkward (and unfortunate) for St. André, who on 3 December had published his forty-page pamphlet A Short Narrative of an Extraordinary Delivery of Rabbets. On this document the surgeon had staked his reputation, and although it offers a more empirical account of the Toft case than earlier more fanciful publications about reproduction in general, ultimately it was derided. Ahlers, his scepticism justified, published Some observations concerning the woman of Godlyman in Surrey, which details his account of events and his suspicion of the complicity of both St. André and Howard.

St. André recanted his views on 9 December 1726. In 1729, following the death of Samuel Molyneux, he married Molyneux's widow, Elizabeth. This did little to impress his peers. Molyneux's cousin accused him of the poisoning, a charge that St. André defended by suing for defamation, but the careers of St. André and his wife were permanently damaged. Elizabeth lost her attendance on Queen Caroline, and St. André was publicly humiliated at court. Living on Elizabeth's considerable wealth, they retired to the country, where St. André died in 1776, aged 96. Manningham, desperate to exculpate himself, published a diary of his observations of Mary Toft, together with an account of her confession of the fraud, on 12 December. In it he suggested that Douglas had been fooled by Toft, and concerned with his image Douglas replied by publishing his own account. Using the pseudonym 'Lover of Truth and Learning', in 1727 Douglas also published The Sooterkin Dissected. A letter to Maubray, Douglas was scathingly critical of his sooterkin theory, calling it "a mere fiction of your [Maubray's] brain". The damage done to the medical profession was such that several doctors not connected with the tale felt compelled to print statements that they had not believed Toft's story.

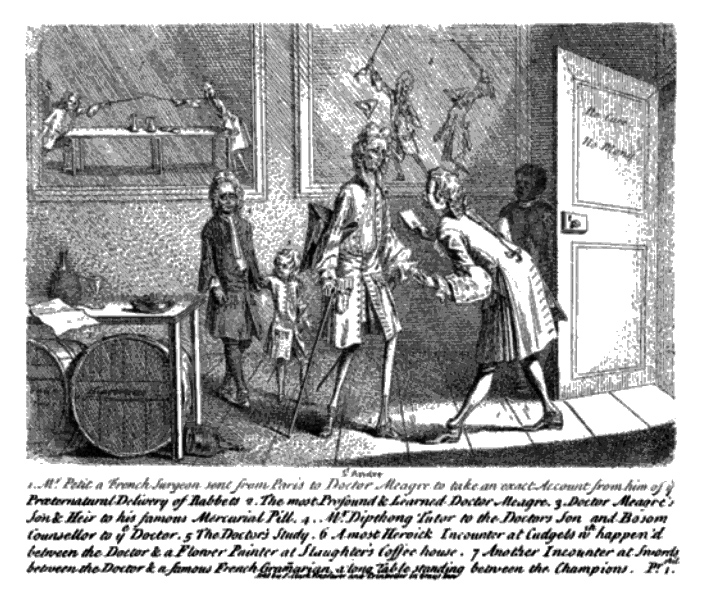
A satirical drawing of St. André receiving a French visitor. Following the scandal, St. André apparently never ate rabbit again.

The case was cited by Robert Walpole's opponents as symbolising the age, which they perceived as greedy, corrupt and deceitful. One author, writing to the Prince of Wales's mistress, suggested the story was a political portent of the approaching death of the prince's father. On 7 January 1727 Mist's Weekly Journal satirised the matter, making several allusions to political change, and comparing the affair to the events of 1641 when Parliament began its revolution against King Charles I. The scandal provided the writers of Grub Street with enough material to produce pamphlets, squibs, broadsides and ballads for several months. With publications such as St. André's Miscarriage (1727) and The anatomist dissected: or the man-midwife finely brought to bed (1727) satirists scorned the objectivity of men-midwives, and critics of Toft's attendants questioned their integrity, undermining their profession with sexual puns and allusions. The case raised questions about England's status as an "enlightened" nation—Voltaire used the case in his brief essay Singularités de la nature to describe how the Protestant English were still influenced by an ignorant Church.

=== Legacy ===
Toft did not escape the ire of the satirists, who concentrated mainly on sexual innuendo. Some took advantage of a common 18th-century word for a rabbit track—prick—and others were scatological in nature. However, Much Ado about Nothing; or, A Plain Refutation of All that Has Been Written or Said Concerning the Rabbit-Woman of Godalming (1727) is one of the more cutting satires on Toft. The document supposes to be the confession of 'Merry Tuft', "... in her own Stile and Spelling". Poking fun at her illiteracy, it makes a number of obscene suggestions hinting at her promiscuity—"I wos a Wuman as had grate nattural parts, and a large Capassiti, and kapible of being kunserned in depe Kuntrivansis." The document also ridicules several of the physicians involved in the affair, and reflects the general view portrayed by the satirists that Toft was a weak woman and the least complicit of "the offenders" (regardless of her guilt). The notion contrasts with that expressed of her before the hoax was revealed and may indicate an overall strategy to disempower Toft completely. This is reflected in one of the most notable satires of the affair, Alexander Pope and William Pulteney's anonymous satirical ballad The Discovery; or, The Squire Turn'd Ferret. Published in 1726 and aimed at Samuel Molyneux, it rhymes "hare" with "hair", and "money" with "conney". The ballad opens with the following verse:

Most true it is, I dare to say,
E'er since the Days of Eve,
The weakest Woman sometimes may
The wisest Man deceive.

In 2019, Mary Toft; or the Rabbit Queen was written by Dexter Palmer. In the novel, Toft is abused by her husband. Another novel, Mary and the Rabbit Dream by Noémi Kiss-Deáki, was published in 2024. This book also features a fictionalized account of Toft's life. Toft is portrayed sympathetically as a desperate woman dealing with hardship. A writer for The Spectator described these books as demonstrating that "Toft's grotesque story still captivates us".
