= Manningham =

Manningham may refer to:

== Places ==
- Manningham, South Australia, a north eastern suburb of Adelaide
- City of Manningham in Victoria, Australia
- Manningham, Bradford, in West Yorkshire, England
- Manningham Road in Victoria, Australia

== Other uses ==
- Manningham (surname)
- Manningham F.C., rugby league team who switched to association football in 1903 and became Bradford City A.F.C.
