= Richard Manningham =

English obstetrician

Sir Richard Manningham M.D. (1690–1759) was an English physician and man-midwife, now remembered for his involvement in the Mary Toft hoax.

== Life ==
The second son of Thomas Manningham, he was born at Eversley, Hampshire. He was intended, like his elder brother Thomas, for the church, and educated at Cambridge, where he graduated LL.B. in 1717. He later (1725) was mandated to take the degree of M.D.

Manningham took a house in Chancery Lane, London, and lived there till 1729, when he moved to the Haymarket, then in 1734 to Woodstock Street, and in the following year to Jermyn Street, where he resided for the rest of his life. On 10 March 1720 he was elected a Fellow of the Royal Society, and on 30 September in the same year was admitted a licentiate of the London College of Physicians. On 18 February 1721 he was knighted by George I. He was the leading man-midwife of his day, and was sometimes engaged in the summer to attend ladies in the country.

In 1739 Manningham established a ward in the parochial infirmary of St. James's, Westminster, for parturient women, the first ward of the kind established in Great Britain; he lectured there on midwifery. He owned property in Chelsea where he ran a silk farm. He died in Chelsea on 11 May 1759 and was buried there. Thomas Denman praised Manningham as "successful in practice and very humane in the exercise of his art".

== Works ==
In 1726 Manningham published Exact Diary of what was observed during a close attendance upon Mary Toft the pretended Rabbit Breeder. Mary Toft of Godalming declared that she had given birth to several rabbits, and fragments of these were produced. Manningham, working with James Douglas, showed that these were pieces of adult and not of young rabbits, and that Toft was not parturient. They absolved the credulous Nathaniel St André of complicity. In the aftermath, William Hogarth drew Toft, London gossiped of the affair, and Manningham's name became more widely known.

Manningham published in 1740 Artis Obstetricariæ Compendium; the parts of the subject of obstetrics are arranged in tabular forms, each tabulation being followed by a series of aphorisms. An English translation was published in 1744. In 1750 appeared his Treatise on the Symptoms, Nature, Causes, and Cure of the Febricula or Little Fever, which reached a third edition in 1755. The term "febricula" came into use; Manningham described under this one heading enteric fever, phlebitis, and the common cold. In 1756 he published in Latin Aphorismata Medica, an enlarged edition of his Compendium; and in 1758 A Discourse concerning the Plague and Pestilential Fevers, an enlargement of The Plague no Contagious Disorder, a pamphlet which he had issued anonymously in 1744.

== Family ==
Thomas Manningham, his second son, graduated M.D. at the University of St Andrews, 24 May 1765, and became a licentiate of the London College of Physicians 25 June. He lived in his father's house in Jermyn Street, London, till 1780, when he went to Bath, Somerset, and died there 3 February 1794.

== Notes ==
Attribution

- This article incorporates text from a publication now in the public domain: Lee, Sidney, ed. (1893). "Manningham, Richard". Dictionary of National Biography. Vol. 36. London: Smith, Elder & Co.
