= Maternal impression =

Disused medical hypothesis

The conception of a maternal impression rests on the belief that a powerful mental (or sometimes physical) influence working on the mother's mind may produce an impression, either general or definite, on the child she is carrying. The child might be said to be "marked" as a result. The theory of maternal impression was most frequently used to explain birth defects. It was discredited in the mid-to-late 18th century, but some continued to believe in the theory into the 19th century.

== History ==
The long-discredited theory of maternal impression has origins dating back to Ancient Greece and Biblical times. Theorists like Aristotle and Hippocrates emphasized the role that a pregnant mother's imagination played in her pregnancy. Aristotle believed that naturalism was the primary factor in reproduction. His law of generative resemblance stated that like produces like. Such beliefs promoted early conceptions of the theory of maternal impression. For example, a mother who was struck by a piece of fruit that was thrown might give birth to a child who had an apple-shaped birthmark. It was also believed to affect animals. Between the Aristotelian era and the 16th century, it was thought that divine influences were the largest factor affecting pregnancy. Beginning in the 16th century, the concept of maternal impression emerged as an explanation for "unusual" birth defects for which there was no apparent medical cause. Many medical practitioners between the 16th and 19th centuries believed that maternal impressions were a result of pregnant women living in violation of the "naturally" ordained lifestyle. Most physicians during this time were not concerned with whether or not the theory of maternal impression existed, but with how and why it affected developing fetuses. The evidence for the theory was largely anecdotal, and had little scientific validity.

Maternal impression was believed for so long due primarily to the lack of knowledge about heredity. The popularity of the theory began to decline as improvements were made in the field of genetics. Gregor Mendel, the so-called "father of genetics" made discoveries in the field of inheritance that initiated the eventual rejection of maternal impression theory. However, even prior to the discovery of modern genetic theory, many cultures had some awareness that traits could be passed through families. A birth defect that was shared amongst two or more family members was often acknowledged to be a family trait. Single instances of birth defects were more influenced by maternal impression theory.

== Medicine ==
The theory of maternal impression stated that an emotional or physical stimulus experienced by a pregnant woman could influence the development of the fetus. Mental problems, such as schizophrenia and depression, were believed to be a manifestation of similar disordered feelings in the mother. For instance, a pregnant woman who experienced great sadness might imprint depressive tendencies onto the fetus in her womb. A mother did not need to remember an impression she had that could have affected her child in utero. Impressions could be subconscious. Oftentimes, mothers were not able to identify one single event that could have resulted in an impression on her child. Mothers were encouraged by medical practitioners to not undertake any activities that could disturb the fetus, but this was often not possible for working class women. The theory of maternal impression was largely abandoned by scientists in the 20th century, with the development of modern genetic theory.

== Folklore and literature ==
It was sometimes supposed that the mother of Joseph "The Elephant Man" Merrick was frightened by an elephant during her pregnancy, thus "imprinting" the memory of the elephant onto the gestating fetus.

Some examples of maternal impression occurred in religious texts, such as the Bible. Genesis 30:37–43 records a story from Iron Age Judea where Jacob places spotted rods where ewes and does can see them to influence the best parts of a flock to give birth to spotted children, as he had earlier made a deal with Laban that he would own the spotted and speckled sheep and goats. This folk belief persisted to the early 20th century, with breeders of Aberdeen Angus cattle attempting to ensure black hides for calves via putting their mother in black-painted surroundings, for example. This logic was extended in general – if a horse foal was born with long ears, then perhaps the mare that had birthed it saw a donkey.

In folklore, maternal imprinting, or Versehen (a German noun meaning "inadvertence" or as a verb "to provide") as it is usually called, is the belief that a sudden fear of some object or animal in a pregnant woman can cause her child to bear the mark of it.

Oswald Spengler, a German philosopher, used Versehen to aid his definition of maternal impression. Spengler offered a folkloric understanding of what he called "blood feeling" or the formation of a group aesthetic of a bodily ideal:

What is called the Versehen of a pregnant woman is only a particular and not very important instance of the workings of a very deep and powerful formative principle inherent in all that is of the race side. It is a matter of common observation that elderly married people become strangely like one another, although probably Science with its measuring instruments would "prove" the exact opposite. It is impossible to exaggerate the formative power of this living pulse, this strong inward feeling for the perfection of one's own type. The feeling for race-beauty—so opposite to the conscious taste of ripe urbans for intellectual-individual traits of beauty—is immensely strong in primitive men, and for that very reason never emerges into their consciousness. But such a feeling is race-forming. It undoubtedly molded the warrior- and hero-type of a nomad tribe more definitely on one bodily ideal, so that it would have been quite unambiguous to speak of the race-figure of Romans or Ostrogoths.

Some of the more vivid examples of Versehen are given in Vance Randolph's Ozark Superstitions:

Children are also said to be marked by some sudden fright or unpleasant experience of the mother, and I have myself seen a pop-eyed, big-mouthed idiot whose condition is ascribed to the fact that his mother stepped on a toad several months before his birth. In another case, a large red mark on a baby's cheek was caused by the mother seeing a man shot down at her side, when the discharge of the gun threw some of the blood and brains into her face.

Other examples in folklore claimed that birthmarks were manifestations of maternal impressions. A birthmark shaped like food was the direct result of the mother's pregnancy cravings. A mother who touched a certain part of her body during a solar eclipse would give birth to a child who had a birthmark in the same location on their body. Some tales sought to prevent instances of maternal impression before they happened. One society warned against a pregnant mother viewing any image of a satyr or other mythical spirit, as the child may be born with a similar appearance.

Pliny the Elder, a Roman naturalist, also comments at length about the phenomenon of postpartum maternal impression in bears, i.e., the folk belief that newborn bears must be licked and molded into bear-shape by their mothers.

== See also ==
- Lihi
- Cortisol#Effects during pregnancy
- Epigenetics
- Fetal origins hypothesis
- Fetal origins of adult disease
- Lamarckism
- Mary Toft
- Mooncalf
- Pseudoscience
- Sooterkin
- Telegony

== Bibliography ==
- Wendy Doniger and Gregory Spinner. "Misconceptions: Parental Imprinting" in "Science in Culture" edited by Peter Louis Galison, Stephen Richards Graubard, Everett Mendelsohn, Transaction Publishers, 2001
- Lily Weiser-Aall. "Svangerskap og Fodsel i Nyere Norsk Tradisjon" in Folklore, Vol. 82, No. 4 (Winter, 1971), pp. 339–40
- Patricia R. Stokes. "Pathology, Danger, and Power: Women's and Physicians' Views of Pregnancy and Childbirth in Weimar Germany" in Social History of Medicine 2000 Vol. 13 (#3)
- Katharine Park. “Impressed Images: Reproducing Wonders,” in Caroline A. Jones and Peter Galison, eds., Picturing Science, Producing Art, New York: Routledge, 1998, 254–71.
- Hiro Hirai. "Imagination, Maternal Desire and Embryology in Thomas Fienus," in G. Manning and C. Klestinec, eds., Professors, Physicians and Practices in the History of Medicine, Cham: Springer, 2017, 211–225.
- Ballantyne, J W. “Maternal Impressions.” Transactions. Edinburgh Obstetrical Society vol. 16, 1891, pp. 7-19.
- Shildrick, M. (2000). Maternal Imagination: Reconceiving First Impressions. Rethinking History, 4(3), 243–260.
- Brosius, Stephanie. “Metamorphosis of a Man: Diagnosing Joseph Merrick.” Journal of the History of the Neurosciences, vol. 19, no. 2, 2010, pp. 171–72.
- Mulvihill, John J., and Wayne W. Grody. “The Gregor Mendel Bicentennial Tribute—Enduring Mementos of the Founder of Genetics.” JAMA : The Journal of the American Medical Association, vol. 330, no. 4, 2023, pp. 297–98, doi:10.1001/jama.2023.9766.
- Pearn, John, and Judith Sweet. “The Origins of Pregnancy Superstitions Relating to Congenital Malformations.” Oceania, vol. 48, no. 2, 1977, pp. 146–53, doi:10.1002/j.1834-4461.1977.tb01331.x.
- Etkin, William. “JACOB’S CATTLE AND MODERN GENETICS: A Scientific Midrash.” Tradition (New York), vol. 7, no. 3, 1965, pp. 5–14.
