= Herman I of Henneberg =

Count of Henneberg

Herman I, Count of Henneberg
- Count of Henneberg-Coburg
- Born: 1224
- Died: 18 December 1290
- Buried: Frauenroth, Bavaria
- Noble family: House of Henneberg
- Spouse: Margaret of Holland
- Issue: Herman; Poppo; Jutta
- Father: Poppo VII of Henneberg
- Mother: Jutta of Thuringia

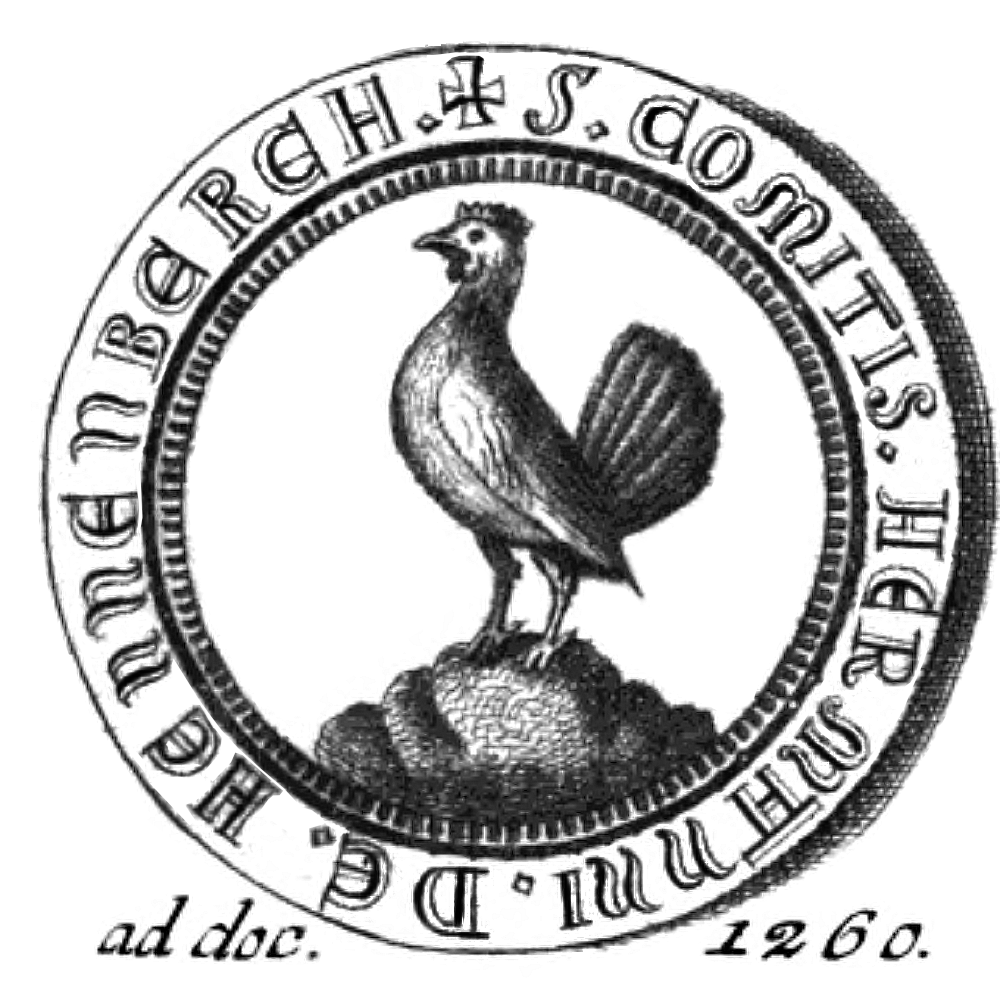
Seal of Herman I Henneberg in 1260

Herman I, Count of Henneberg (1224 – 18 December 1290) was the son of Count Poppo VII of Henneberg and his wife, Jutta of Thuringia (born: 1184; died: 6 August 1235 in Schleusingen), the eldest daughter of Landgrave Herman I of Thuringia. This was Poppo's second marriage and also Jutta's second marriage. Margrave Henry III of Meissen was Herman's half-brother from his mother's side. Herman supported the election of his uncle Henry Raspe as anti-king of the Germans.

Herman founded the "new lordship" around Coburg and Eisenburg, which was inherited by the House of Wettin via his grand-niece Catherine of Henneberg.

== Marriage and issue ==
In 1249, Herman married Margaret (died: 26 March 1276), the sister of Count William II of Holland and King of the Germans. They had three children:

- Herman (d. 1250)
- Jutta (c. 1252 – c. 1312), married Margrave Otto V of Brandenburg-Salzwedel
- Poppo (c. 1254 – 1291), married Sophie of Wittelsbach (c. 1264 – 1282), daughter of Elizabeth of Hungary, but they had no issue
