= Sooterkin =

Mythical European creature

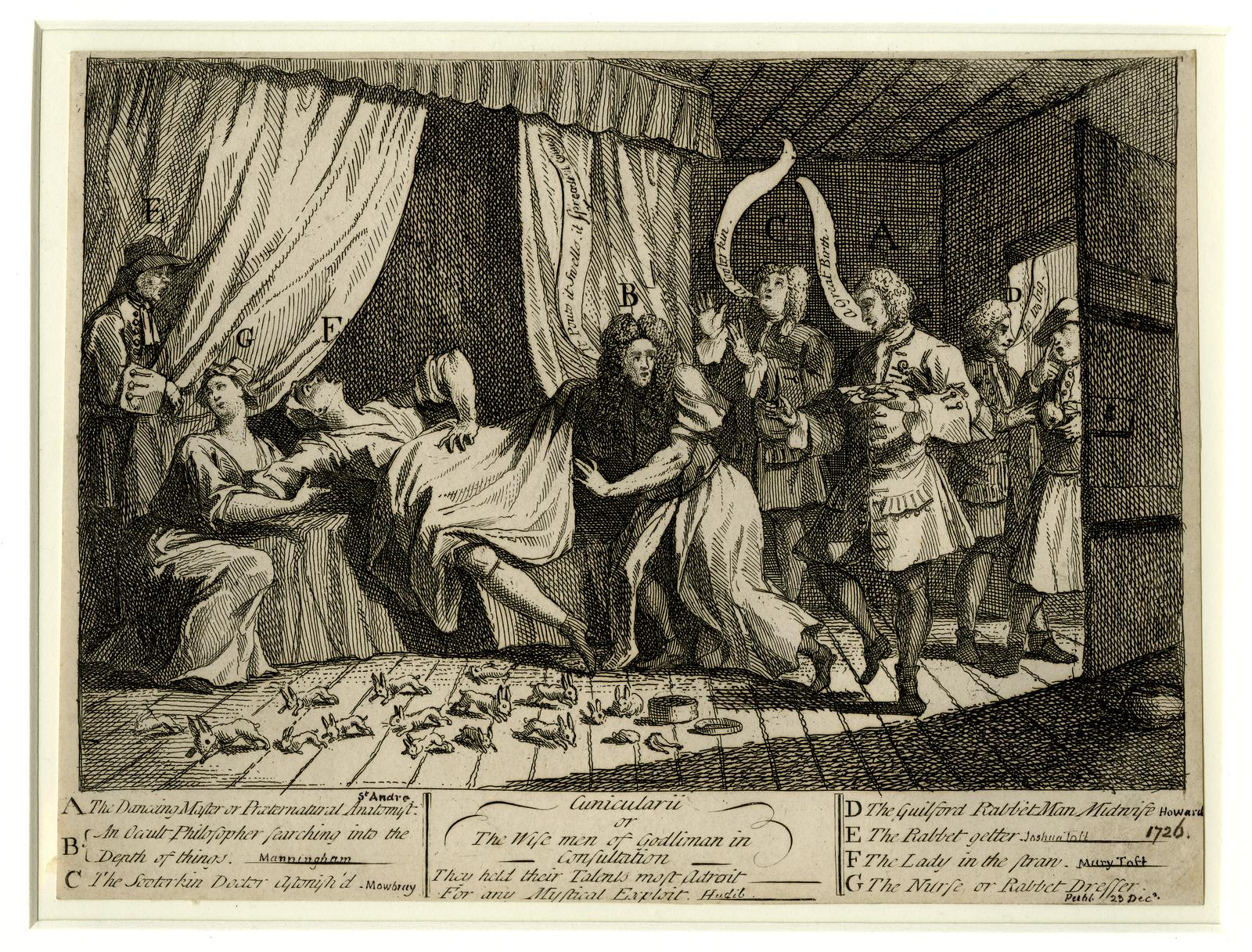
Mary Toft birthing her sooterkin-rabbits

A sooterkin is a fabled small mole-like creature that certain women were believed to have been capable of giving birth to. The origin of this initially jocular fantasy lies in the 18th century, and some eminent physicians of the day considered it factual. It is attributed to a tendency of Dutch women to frequently sit on stoves or use them under their petticoats to keep warm, hence causing the breeding of a small kind of animal that would mature and be born.

== History ==
The English physician John Maubray published a work entitled The Female Physician, in which he proposed that it was possible for women to give birth to sooterkins. Maubray was an advocate for maternal impression, a widely held belief that conception and pregnancy could be influenced by what the pregnant mother dreamt of, or saw. Maubray warned pregnant women that over-familiarity with household pets could make their children resemble those animals. He was involved in the case of Mary Toft, who appeared to vindicate his theory by giving birth to rabbits, although the whole affair was eventually exposed for the hoax that it was.

A person under the alias Dr Giovanni then published a paper addressed to Maubray titled The Sooterkin Dissected which said that "God did not make [the sooterkin]", "the devil could not make it", and "it is stupidity to believe it".

== Popular culture ==
The Dictionary of Disgusting Facts uses the variant spelling “sootikin”.
