= Manningham (surname) =

Manningham is a surname. Notable people with the surname include:

- Coote Manningham (c. 1765 – 1809), British army officer
- John Manningham (died 1622), English lawyer and diarist
- Mario Manningham (born 1986), football player for the New York Giants
- Thomas Manningham (c. 1651 – 1722), English churchman, Bishop of Chichester
