= John Maubray =

Scottish physician

John Maubray (1700–1732) was a Scottish physician, who practised in London as an early teacher of midwives. He wrote a book called "The Female Physician" published in 1724, and became chairman of the Charitable Corporation.

As a member of a group of London-based man midwives he was a follower of the ideas of the Dutch surgeon, Hendrik van Deventer (1651–1724), whose wife was also a midwife.

The following is a quote from Maubray's "The Female Physician":

"men...being better versed in Anatomy, better acquainted with Physical Helps, and commonly endued with greater presence of Mind, have been always found readier or discreeter, to devise something new, and to give quicker Relief in Cases if difficult or preternatural births, than common midwives generally understand."

Maubray was associated with the peculiar concept of the Sooterkin, which held that pregnant women who were regularly in the presence of certain animals could give birth to children bearing the same characteristics as those animals. Maubray was one of the experts in the case of Mary Toft, who had allegedly given birth to rabbits, which he saw as proof of his theories. But, despite his credulity, he was also far-sighted, condemning the more barbarous instruments then being used in obstetrics and lobbying for the foundation of a lying-in hospital citing Hôtel Dieu in Paris as a model.
