= Nathaniel St André =

Swiss physician in England

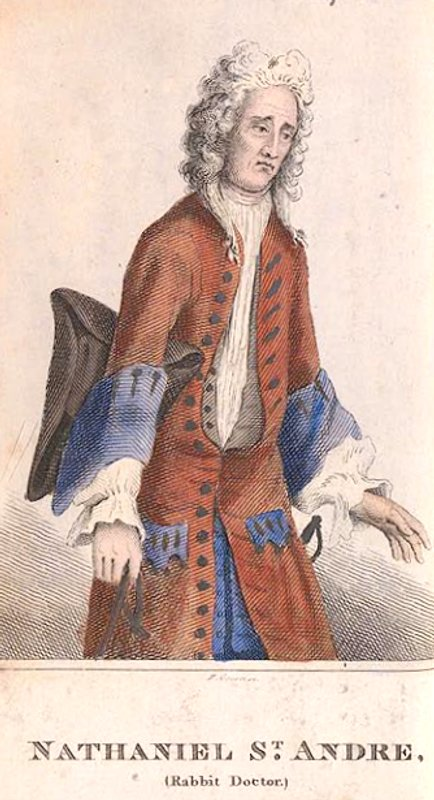
St André depicted in a satirical engraving of 1726.

Nathaniel St André (c. 1680–March 1776) was a Swiss physician who practised in England.

== Life ==
Born in Switzerland, St André moved to England in his youth, as a page to a Jewish family. On arrival, he made his living teaching French, German, dancing and fencing. However, his fencing was poor, and he was soon injured by a pupil, requiring medical attention. He was impressed by the surgeon's wealth, and decided to take up medicine, taking up an apprenticeship with a surgeon in London. This enabled him to set up his own practice, based at Northumberland Court, and was then appointed surgeon at the Westminster Infirmary. He also gave public lectures in anatomy and surgery, translated René-Jacques Garengeot's A Treatise of Chirurgical Operations into English and introduced some new approaches to using wax to prepare anatomical specimens.

In May 1723, St André was appointed as surgeon and anatomist to the royal household by George I, his fluent German finding favour with those courtiers who had not learnt English. In 1725, he claimed that he had been poisoned by drinking a cordial offered when he visited a woman with venereal disease. He wrote a detailed account of the supposed effects of the poisoning, which also detailed his position at court. The Privy Council offered a £200 reward if the poisoner was found, but none of the individuals involved was ever identified.

Alexander Pope was successfully treated by St André in 1726, and the two struck up a lifelong friendship. In the same year, St André examined the king personally for the first time. Treatment was successful, and the king gave him his own sword in thanks. In November, St André travelled to Godalming to examine Mary Toft, a woman who claimed to have given birth to fourteen rabbits. He was convinced, and stated that he had helped with the delivery of a fifteenth. He then staged a demonstration in London which purported to show how this would be possible, and subsequently brought Toft to the city, arranging public viewings of her.

In December, he published A Short Narrative of an Extraordinary Delivery of Rabbets but, a couple of days afterwards, Toft confessed to the event being a fraud. While St André was suspected of involvement in the hoax, both Toft and independent investigators claimed that he had been duped. Following this, St André was refused audience with the king, and his royal duties and salary were removed, although he did retain the title of court anatomist.

In 1728, St André treated Samuel Molyneux, a member of parliament who had suffered a fit while in the House of Commons. The treatment did not prove successful, and Molyneux died in April. On the night of the death, St André eloped with Molyneux's wife, Elizabeth, the two marrying in 1730. Samuel Madden, a relative of Molyneux's, claimed that St André had poisoned the MP. Although St André won an action for defamation, he found himself unable to secure regular work. He and Elizabeth retired to the countryside, then moved to Southampton in the early 1750s, devoting their time to charitable works, botany, gardening and architecture. On Elizabeth's death, St André lost her considerable inherited income, while he also lost money on investments and most of his possessions in a fire, living his last years within an almshouse. He died at the age of 96, in 1776, having refused to eat rabbit for the past fifty years.

== Publications ==
- A short narrative of an extraordinary delivery of rabbets perform’d by Mr. John Howard, Surgeon at Guilford. 2. Auflage. London 1726. (Digitalisat at the Internet Archive)
- Rene Jacques Croissant de Garengeot: A treatise of chirurgical operations. According to the mechanism of the parts of the humane body. 1723. (Translated by Nathaniel St. André; Original French title: Traité des opérations de chirurgie. Suivant la méchanique des parties du corps humain.)
