= Michael Waginger =

German ice hockey player (born 1979)

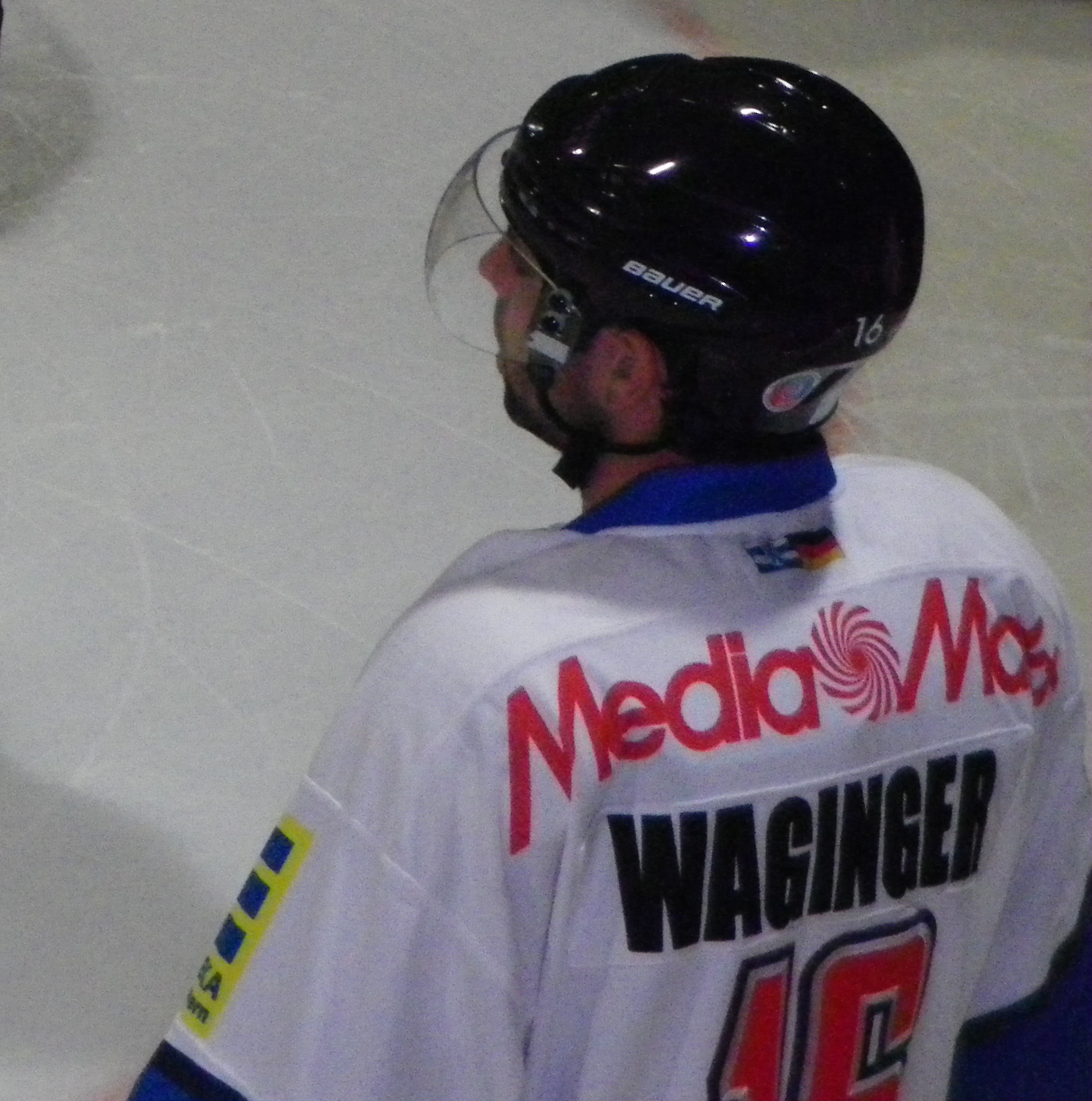
- Born: July 5, 1979 (age 45); Sonthofen, West Germany
- Height: 6 ft 0 in (183 cm)
- Weight: 181 lb (82 kg; 12 st 13 lb)
- Position: Forward
- Shoots: Left
- DEL team: ERC Ingolstadt
- NHL draft: Undrafted
- Playing career: 1998–present

Michael Waginger (born October 11, 1979) is a German professional ice hockey player. He is currently playing for ERC Ingolstadt in the Deutsche Eishockey Liga (DEL).
