= Thomas Manningham =

English churchman

Thomas Manningham (1651?-1722) was an English churchman, bishop of Chichester from 1709.

== Life ==
He was born about 1651 in the parish of St. George, Southwark, the son of Richard Manningham (d. 1682), rector of Michelmersh, Hampshire, and grandson of John Manningham, the diarist. He was admitted in 1661 scholar of Winchester College, then going with a scholarship to New College, Oxford, where he matriculated on 12 August 1669. He was fellow from 1671 until 1681, and graduated B.A. in 1673, M.A. on 15 January 1676–7.

He was for some time tutor to Sir John Robinson, bart., eldest son of Sir John Robinson, sometime Lieutenant of the Tower of London. In 1681 he was presented to the rectory of East Tisted, Hampshire. The king, who admired his preaching, promised him the prebend of Winchester, vacated by the promotion of Thomas Ken to the bishopric of Bath and Wells; it proved, however, to be in the gift of the lord keeper, and Thomas Fox obtained it. In November 1684 Manningham was made preacher at the Rolls Chapel, and from about 1689 to 1692 was head-master of Westerham grammar school, Kent. He subsequently became rector of St. Andrew, Holborn, on 8 September 1691; chaplain in ordinary to William III and Mary II; canon at St George's Chapel, Windsor on 28 January 1692-3 (until 1709); rector of Great Haseley, Oxfordshire, 1708; and dean of Windsor on 26 February 1709.

On 21 December 1691 John Tillotson, the Archbishop of Canterbury, created him D.D. He was consecrated bishop of Chichester on 13 November 1709, and dying on 25 August 1722 at his house in Greville Street, Holborn, was buried in St. Andrew's, Holborn.

== Works ==
Manningham printed many sermons between 1680 and his death, and was author of Two Discourses, London, 1681, and The Value of Church and College Leases consider'd in Sir Isaac Newton's Tables, 1742.

== Family ==
His wife Elizabeth (1657–1714) was buried in Chichester Cathedral, where there is a monument to her memory by Edward Stanton.

In his will he mentions three sons: Thomas Manningham, D.D. (d. 1750), treasurer of Chichester in 1712, prebendary of Westminster in 1720, and rector of Slinfold and Selsey, Sussex; Sir Richard Manningham, M.D.; and Simon Manningham, prebendary of Chichester (1719–67) and vicar of Eastbourne (1720–34); and two married daughters, Mary Rawlinson and Dorothea Walters, besides five other children.
