= Folcwin =

Frankish abbot and cleric

Saint Folcwin or Folcuin (Latin: Folquinus, Folcwinus, Folcvinus; Old Dutch: *Folkwin; French: Folquin) (d. 14 or 15 December 855) was a Frankish abbot, cleric, and Bishop of Thérouanne (appointed 816).

== Biography ==
Folcwin was born to Hieronymus, son of Charles Martel, and his wife Ercheswinda (Ermentrudis). He was appointed bishop of Thérouanne in 816 and confirmed by Louis the Pious; he was consecrated in 817 by the Archbishop of Reims, likely Ebbo. He seems to have remained loyal to Louis. Folcwin participated regularly in synods, including the synods of Ingelheim am Rhein (840), Paris (846/7), Quierzy (849), and Soissons (853). Charles the Bald appointed him as Missus dominicus for one of the twelve West-Frankish missatica, one which apparently overlapped mostly with his diocese.

Folcwin was closely tied to the Abbey of Saint Bertin; in 843 he returned the relics of Audomar (the founder of Bertin) to Sithiu (now Saint-Omer). Archbishop Hincmar of Reims asked Folwin for relics for the dedication of the altar in Reims Cathedral; with the Normans threatening, Folcwin sent off relics of Ss Bertin and Winnoc for security reasons.

Folcuin died on 15 December 855 during an official visit to Esquelbecq. During his lifetime Charles the Bald seems to have already tried to forcefully appoint a successor; after his death, Hincmar made every effort to have his successor be appointed through a process originating in Thérouanne. Folcuin's remains were elevated on 16 November 928, and translated in 1181. The earliest evidence of a cult is found in the work of his relative, Folcuin, abbot of Lobbes, who produced the Gesta abbatum Sithiensium (or Gesta abbatum Sancti Bertini, "Deeds of the Abbots of Saint-Bertin"), a combination of chronicle and cartulary. Folcuin incorporates numerous charters from the abbey's archives into his historical narrative, which begins with the abbey's foundation around 650 and continues to 961/2. It was composed at the request of the lay abbot, Adalolf.

Evidence from a hagiographical manuscript from the time of abbot Odbert (986-1007) shows that Folcwin, along with Silvin of Auchy (whose body was in Saint-Bertin, after Arnulf I stole it from Auchy-les-Moines), Bertin, and Winnoc, was "fundamental to [the] institutional identity" of the monks in Saint-Bertin. Folcwin's name is found in liturgical manuals from the area by the beginning of the eleventh century.

He is venerated in the Roman Catholic Church on 14 December, as well as the Eastern Orthodox Church.

The first part of the Latin cartulary of St Bertin's is credited to St Folquin. A review of his life was written during the next century by his grand nephew Folcuin, abbot of Lobbes, on request of Walter, abbot of Saint-Bertin.

== Note ==
Some sources say he died on the 15th of December, some say the 14th.

== See also ==
- Saint-Folquin, a commune in the Pas-de-Calais department named for Folcwin
- Saint Hunfrid of Prüm, successor of Folquin as Bishop of Thérouanne
