= Drogo (bishop of Thérouanne) =

French bishop

Drogo was bishop of Thérouanne from 1030 to 1078. Very little is known about his early life, except that he was a cleric from Amiens and a monk from Saint Bertin, where he learned music from Enguerrand, abbot of St. Riquier. At the beginning of his episcopate, he was in conflict with Baldwin IV, Count of Flanders, who ousted him in 1030, probably in the context of his conflict with his son, Baldwin V. By 1032 he was back at his siege, and from 1035 he frequently appeared alongside the younger Baldwin. In 1036 he substituted for bishop Fulk of Amiens at the elevation of the relics of St. Adalard at Corbie. He was a participant of the Council of Reims in 1049, where he made count Baldwin sign a "Peace of God" agreement, promising to respect merchants, clerics, women and church assets. In 1052, he performed the elevation of St. Omer and St. Bertin. During his episcopate, at least five new religious houses were founded, and all of them received privileges from him: a nunnery at Mesen, canonries at Voormezele, Ardres and Zonnebeke, and a priory for canons regular at Watten.

At the council of Poitiers, in 1078, he was interdicted by Hugh of Die, the legate of Pope Gregory VII. While the latter was very angered by this decision, which he thought too harsh, Drogo died the same year (on 21 August) while still interdicted, even after the intercession of archbishop Manasses I of Reims.
