= Folkwin =

- Gender: Masculine

Origin
- Language: German
- Meaning: From the Germanic words folk, meaning "people", and wini, meaning "friend"

Folkwin, also spelled Folcwin, Folcuin or Volkwin, is a masculine given name of German origin.

- Folcwin (died 855), bishop of Thérouanne
- Folcuin (c. 935–990), abbot of Lobbes
- Volkwin (died 1236), master of the Livonian Swordbrothers
