= Silvin of Auchy =

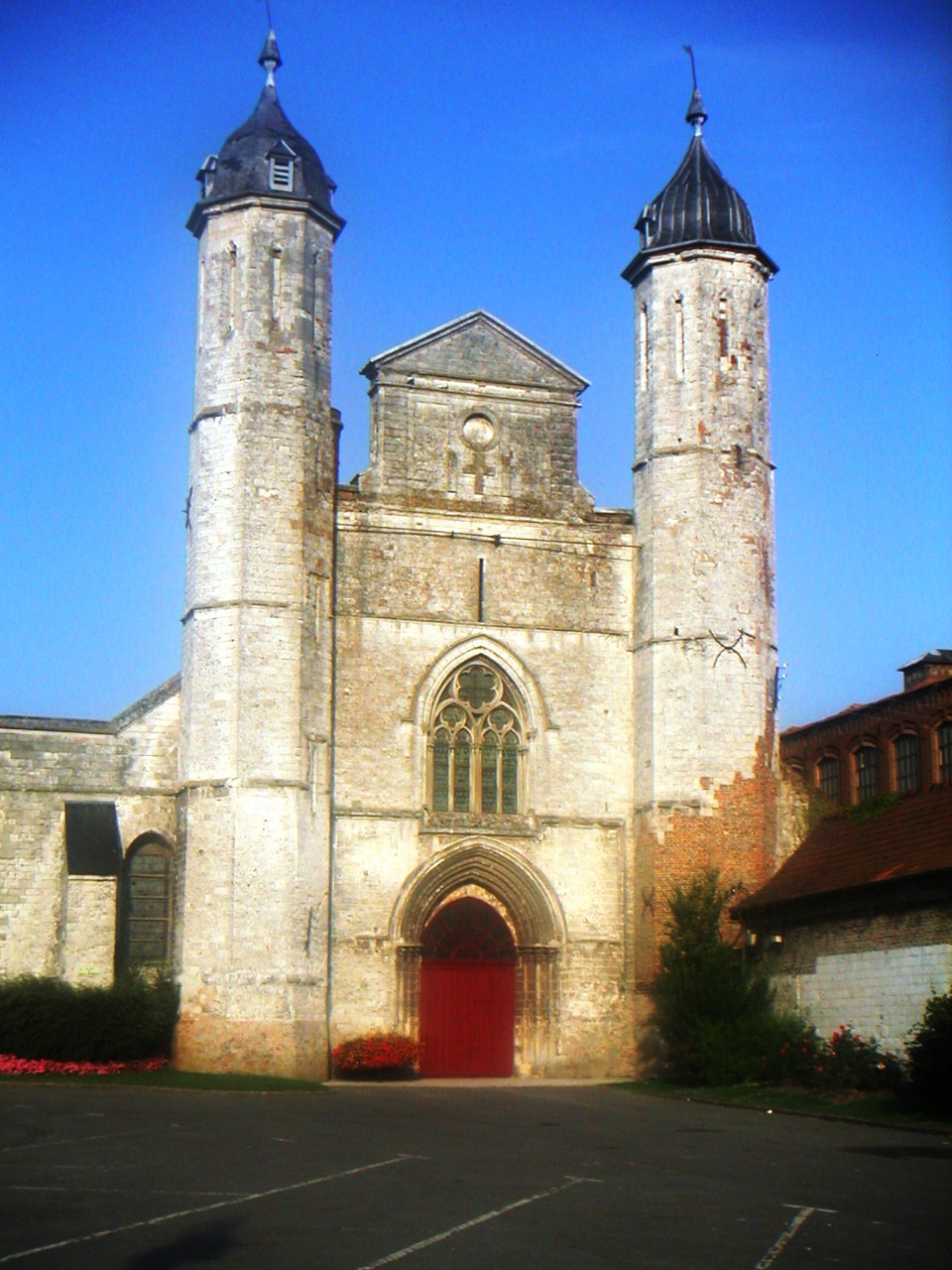
L'Abbatiale St Sylvin, Auchy-lès-Hesdin

Saint Silvinus or Silvin (c. 650 in Toulouse – 15 February 717 in Auchy) was an evangelist in the area of Thérouanne, which is now in northern France.

== Life ==
Silvin was born of a notable family of the area of Toulouse and passed his first years at the courts of Childeric II and Theodoric III. Shortly before a planned marriage, he renounced all worldly prospects, and retired from court. He made pilgrimages to the Holy Land and to Rome, where he was ordained. He was then consecrated an itinerant bishop to preach the Gospel in the north of France. He seems to have concentrated his efforts in the Ancient Diocese of Thérouanne.

He retired to the Benedictine abbey of Auchy-les-Moines, where he later died and was buried. His body was stolen by Arnulf I and he became a central saint for the Abbey of Saint Bertin.

St. Silvin is mentioned in a French legendary in Lund. In Auchy he is commemorated on 15 February, his date of death; elsewhere his feast day is 17 February, the date of burial.
