= John of Thérouanne =

John of Warneton

Bishop of Thérouanne
- Born: c. 1065; Warneton, County of Flanders
- Died: 27 January 1130(aged c.65); Thérouanne, Kingdom of France
- Venerated in: Catholic Church
- Attributes: Episcopal vestments, crozier
- Patronage: His specific patronages are not recorded

John of Warneton (died 27 January 1130), also known as John of Thérouanne or Blessed John of Warneton, was a canon regular and bishop of Thérouanne from 1099 until his death in 1130. He is venerated in the Catholic Church as beatified.

John was a canon regular at Mont-Saint-Éloi, where he came under the spiritual direction of Ivo of Chartres, a leading canonist of the period. He served as archdeacon of Arras from 1096 to 1099, before being elected to the see of Thérouanne, reportedly accepting the office only reluctantly and under papal order.

His episcopate, lasting 31 years, was marked by a program of reform associated with the broader movement of canonical reform then spreading through northern France. He is credited with founding several monasteries and reforming existing religious houses within his diocese, and with recruiting clergy committed to that reform.

While he maintained a reputation for strict personal discipline, contemporaries described him as gentle with individuals; he reportedly declined to prosecute several men who had attempted to assassinate him.

On 13 April, 1108, John presided over the solemn exhumation of the relics of his predecessor Saint Hunfrid (Humphrey), a ninth-century bishop of Thérouanne venerated locally as a saint. Hunfrid's head was subsequently enshrined at Saint-Omer; the remainder of his relics were transferred to Ypres in 1553, and burned by the anti-Spanish rebels in 1563.

John was a contemporary of Charles the Good, count of Flanders, whose assassination in Bruges in 1127 was among the most notorious political murders of the early twelfth century. Both men were commemorated by the same biographer, Walter of Thérouanne, archdeacon of Thérouanne from 1116 to 1132, who composed a vita of each within a few years of their respective deaths.

John died on 27 January, 1130, at approximately 65 years of age, after 31 years as bishop.

Walter of Thérouanne's Vita Iohannis Morinensis episcopi ("The Life of Lord John, Bishop of Thérouanne"), composed 1130–1132, is the principal near-contemporary source for John's life. It was critically edited by Jeff Rider in Corpus Christianorum, Continuatio Mediaevalis vol. 217, and translated into English for the first time in Rider's 2024 volume for the Corpus Christianorum in Translation series.
