= Hubert, bishop of Thérouanne =

11th-century French bishop

Hubert was bishop of Therouanne from 1078/9 to 1081. He was formerly the archdeacon of the same diocese. He was reprimanded several times by Pope Gregory VII, and even excommunicated, but according to other sources he was well-lettered and was positively concerned with the ecclesiastical property of his diocese, putting it in good order and increasing its revenues.

Even before being elected bishop, in 1078, Gregory VII reproached him about the vill of Quesques, which he had supposedly misappropriated together with the counts Guy and Hugh of Saint-Pol and Eustace of Boulogne. Moreover, he was excommunicated. Two years later, Gregory insisted that he should make restitution or prove his innocence, and threatened him with destitution. Later, he further reproached him for not enforcing the celibacy of clerics.

He also intervened in the succession crisis at the abbey of Saint-Winoc de Bergues, which confronted him with Robert I, Count of Flanders. When Ermenger was deposed at the council of Poitiers in 1079, and Manasses was elected, Hubert refused to accept him, and even excommunicated him. However, Robert I, supported by the papal legate Hugh of Die, obtained Manasses confirmation directly from the Pope.

He was gravely injured during a fight later in his life, after which he became a monk at Saint Bertin, and ended his life at the priory of Saint-Mommelin.
