= Hunfrid of Prüm =

Frankish-German Benedictine monk (died 871)

Saint Hunfrid of Prüm
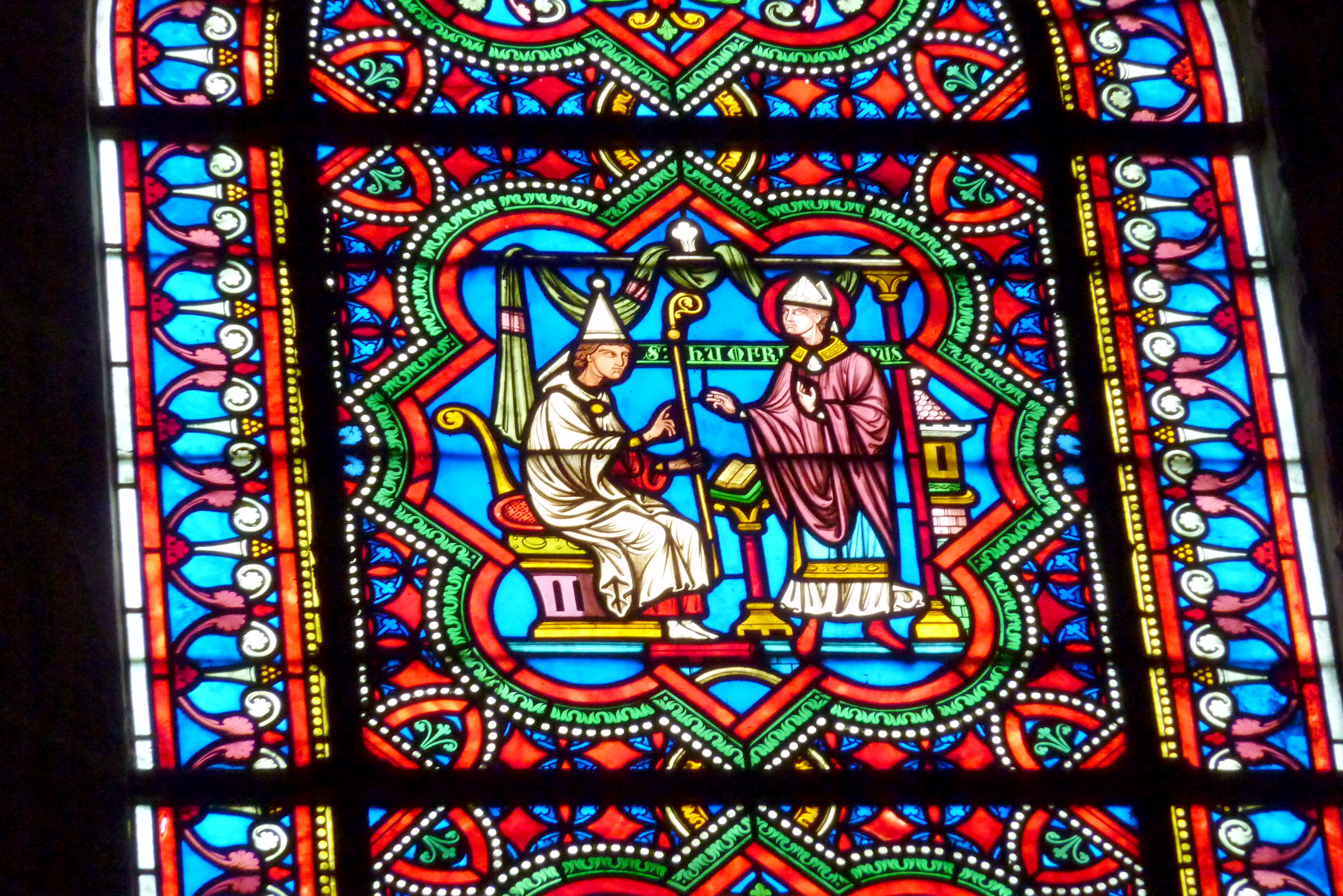
- Stained glass depiction of Hunfrid's consecration as Bishop of Thérouanne, Notre-Dame Cathedral, Saint-Omer (1872–1875)

Benedictine Monk, Bishop, and Abbot "The Bishop in the Storm"
- Born: Meuse River or Prüm, Frankish Empire
- Died: 8 March 871; Prüm, Frankish Empire
- Venerated in: Catholic Church, Orthodox Church
- Major shrine: Arras Cathedral, France
- Feast: 8 March
- Attributes: Holding a Crozier in his left hand, holding a Ship on his right hand
- Patronage: His specific patronages are not recorded

Hunfrid of Prüm (died 8 March, 871), also known as Saint Humphrey, was an East Frankish Benedictine monk at Prüm Abbey who was promoted to bishop of Thérouanne in Gaul in 856 by Pope Nicholas I. He later served as the abbot of Saint-Bertin in France from 864 to 868.

Known as "The Bishop in the Storm" for his steadfast leadership and fearlessness during the Norse devastation of northern France, Hunfrid became a symbol of pastoral courage in the face of overwhelming adversity.

His Feast Day is 8 March, the day of his death.

== Family and background ==
Hunfrid came from an aristocratic Carolingian family connected to the founders of Hornbach. He was the son of Count Alberich and Huna, and had siblings including Henry, another Alberich, and Heriric. His brother Heriric was nephew (nepos) to Count Werner, further cementing the family's connection to the Widonid aristocratic network.

The family maintained extensive landholdings in eastern Francia and Lotharingia, with close ties to key Lotharingian aristocratic families. Hunfrid's ecclesiastical career in western Francia provided the family with connections to multiple Carolingian kings, allowing them to maintain influence across the Carolingian Empire.

=== Connection to the Salian dynasty ===
The genealogical line from Hunfrid's family connects to some of the most significant dynasties of medieval Europe. Through Count Werner and the broader Widonid network, the family is ancestral to the Salian dynasty, which would later produce Holy Roman Emperors including Conrad II (reigned 1027–1039), who founded the Salian imperial dynasty. The Salians were descended from the descendants of Hornbach's founders, making Hunfrid part of a lineage that shaped European history for centuries.

The genealogical chart shows that Hunfrid's nephew (through his brother Heriric and Count Werner's line) ultimately connects to Otto I, Liutgard, Conrad the Red, Otto of Worms, and eventually the Salian emperors—eleven generations of descendants from Hornbach's founders who would play crucial roles in German and European politics.

== Monastic life ==
Hunfrid came from France to Prüm Abbey where he received the Benedictine habit. He was a fellow monk with Saint Ansbald, who would later become the rebuilder of the abbey. During his time at Prüm, Emperor Lothair I arrived at the monastery as a very sick old man, seeking to end his life among the brethren. The emperor survived only six days, and Hunfrid was among the brothers who reverently buried him in the Church of the Holy Saviour or commonly known as Prüm Abbey

== Episcopal career ==
Within a year of Lothair's death, Saint Folkwin, Bishop of Thérouanne, died. Despite his reluctance, Hunfrid was elected to succeed him in 856, with the appointment confirmed by Pope Nicholas I.

=== The Norman devastation ===
The simple monk found himself thrust into an extraordinarily difficult situation. The Diocese of Thérouanne was being systematically devastated by Norse (Norman/Danish) raiders who had penetrated as far inland as their ships could carry them before descending upon the countryside. The invaders laid waste to fields, burned towns and villages, and attacked ecclesiastical sites with particular ferocity.

At Whitsuntide, the Northmen seized the great monastery of Saint-Bertin at Saint-Omer, looted it, set it on fire, and tortured and killed four monks who had been left in charge. The town of Thérouanne itself was attacked, forcing Bishop Hunfrid to flee for his life.

=== "The Bishop in the Storm" ===
It was during the Norse devastation of his diocese that Hunfrid earned the epithet by which he is remembered in hagiographic tradition: The Bishop in the Storm. Though he fled when the physical danger was immediate and his life at risk, he never abandoned his flock in spirit. He offered comfort wherever he could, sought refuge for the displaced, and worked ceaselessly to hold together the scattered remnants of his diocese even as the Northmen continued their campaign of destruction.

=== Appeal to Rome ===
Dismayed and discouraged by the destruction around him, Hunfrid appealed to Pope Nicholas I for permission to resign his bishopric and return to monastic life at Prüm. The pope responded with sympathy but firmness, refusing the request with a memorable analogy: "Do you not know, dearest brother, that if it is dangerous for the pilot to desert the ship when the sea is calm, it is far worse if he abandons his post in troubled waters?"

While Pope Nicholas made clear that Hunfrid was justified in fleeing from his persecutors when necessary, he urged the bishop to hold himself in readiness to return as soon as circumstances allowed, to gather together and encourage his scattered flock.

=== Return and reconstruction ===
The Norse raiders eventually withdrew from the raids, and Hunfrid returned to his devastated see. He played a noble part in encouraging the people to return to their homes, rebuild their sanctuaries, then sold church valuables to sustain them all. He worked closely with Abbot Adelard to rebuild Saint-Bertin monastery, and after Adelard's death, Hunfrid was chosen to succeed him as abbot, ruling the abbey while continuing to serve as Bishop of Thérouanne.

=== The Assumption miracle of 862 ===
On 15 August, 862, an event occurred in Thérouanne. A servant was ironing his master's shirt in preparation for Mass when blood reportedly began to flow from under the iron. Bishop Hunfrid ordered that the bloodstained garment be preserved in the cathedral as a relic. In response to this apparent miracle, he decreed that the Feast of the Assumption should be solemnly celebrated and observed as a holy day throughout the diocese, a practice that had not been universally followed before. This established the Assumption as a major feast throughout his province.

=== Removal from Saint-Bertin ===
In 868, Hunfrid was forcibly removed from his position as Abbot of Saint-Bertin by King Charles the Bald, who wished to install his own candidate, a secular canon named Hildwin.

=== Conciliar participation ===
Primary sources preserved in the Monumenta Germaniae Historica (MGH Concilia 4) document Hunfrid's sustained and active participation across at least six years of Carolingian church governance. He appeared at least eight times across multiple councils and royal charters, consistently identified as Humfridus or Hunfridus Morinensium episcopus, Bishop of the Morini, the ancient name for the people of Thérouanne's territory.

At the Council of Tusey (22, October–7 November, 860), convened by bishops from twelve provinces to address the predestination controversy and the crisis of church property destroyed by the Norse, Hunfrid subscribed the main conciliar acts, the First Charter for Saint-Martin in Tours, and the Second Charter for Saint-Martin, the latter issued explicitly in response to Norse devastation of the monastery, described in the charter text as qualiter praedictus locus lamentabile devastationis insolitae malum a perfida gente Nortmannorum pertulerit ("how that place suffered the lamentable evil of unprecedented devastation from the perfidious Norse people") The council's opening declaration stated the assembled bishops had gathered to address de periculo pereuntis populi, "the danger to the perishing people entrusted to their hands", the very crisis consuming Hunfrid's own diocese. He subscribed again at the Council of Pîtres-Soissons (June, 862) and signed the Saint-Denis royal charter confirming monastic privileges later that same year. He also appears as a witness at the Synod of Verberie (October 863), where he signed a royal judgment in the politically charged case of Bishop Rothad of Soissons.

At Soissons (18–25 August, 866), Hunfrid subscribed both synodal letters to Pope Nicholas I, including the letter appealing on behalf of bishops expulsus penitus a propria sede utriusque gentis Normannorum, "driven entirely from their own sees by the savagery of the Norse", a description that may have reflected his own experience in Thérouanne.

His name appears across these documents in four distinct Latin spellings, Humfridus, Hunfridus, Hun(t)fridus, and Untfredi. His attestation range of 856–870 is confirmed across all sources.

== The 868 gift and pilgrimage ==
In 868, Hunfrid's brother Heriric prepared to depart on a pilgrimage to Rome. Before leaving, Heriric made a substantial gift of estates at Bingen, Weinsheim, and Glan (down the Nahe river) to Prüm Abbey for the salvation of his soul and those of his brothers Hunfrid, Henry, and Alberich, and of his parents Alberich and Huna. The gift was witnessed by fifty-five men, including Bishop Hunfrid himself, several Prüm monks, the abbey's vicedominus, and Count Megingoz.

Hunfrid himself prepared for his own pilgrimage to Rome, to the tombs of the apostles Peter and Paul. He was accompanied by a monk named Guntbert, who served as his companion and scribe. Such journeys were perilous, and a safe return could not be assumed. Before departing, Hunfrid put his affairs in order, and during the journey near Bingen am Rhein on the Rhine, he donated an estate to Prüm Abbey.

This transaction illustrates both the family's strategic landholdings on the western border of the east Frankish kingdom and Hunfrid's enduring close relationship with Prüm Abbey, even while serving as bishop and abbot elsewhere.

== Manuscript tradition ==
Hunfrid appears in several important Carolingian manuscript collections, demonstrating his significance within royal administrative networks during Charles the Bald's reign.

=== The New Haven manuscript ===
The Capitulary of Quierzy (857) survives in a luxury manuscript now held at the Beinecke Rare Book and Manuscript Library at Yale University (MS 413). This manuscript preserves the capitulary in the version specifically addressed to Bishop Hunfrid of Thérouanne and Counts Ingiscalc and Berengar.

Created around 875 CE, just four years after Hunfrid's death, the manuscript is described as a "luxury edition" (German: Luxusausgabe) due to its elaborate illuminated initials in red, green, and gold on fine parchment. Most capitulary manuscripts are plain working copies, making this luxurious presentation manuscript exceptional. The lavish production suggests it was intended for Emperor Charles the Bald himself or his immediate court.

=== Scholarly debate on provenance ===
Recent scholarship by the Capitularia Project at the University of Cologne has challenged the traditional attribution of the New Haven manuscript to Reims. While earlier scholars proposed Reims based on paleographic and artistic similarities, Semih Heinen argued in 2018 that the manuscript's selective content points instead to Sens as its origin.

The manuscript contains a list of royal missi (representatives) from the Capitulary of Servais (853), but uniquely preserves only section ten of this list—naming Wenilo of Sens († 865) and two counts—while omitting all other sections, including section one which would have featured Hincmar of Reims at its head. Heinen questions why a Reims scribe would commit such an omission: "Why would a scribe in Reims commit such a lapse? Why would he only include a suffragan of his province elsewhere, when here he had the opportunity to name his own Metropolitan?"

Heinen proposes that Archbishop Ansegis of Sens (who assumed office in 871, the year of Hunfrid's death) commissioned the manuscript around 875, possibly as a presentation to Charles the Bald following his imperial coronation that year. Ansegis rose to Apostolic Vicar of Gaul and Germania after Charles's coronation, a position that generated significant rivalry with Hincmar of Reims.

=== Textual tradition ===
The textual history of the capitularies in the New Haven manuscript reveals connections to both Lotharingia and Sens rather than Reims. Manuscript scholar Hubert Mordek identified the exemplar used for several capitularies as belonging to what he termed the Collectio Senonica (Sens Collection), compiled after 864.

The New Haven manuscript's sister manuscripts—Paris, Bibliothèque Nationale, Lat. 9654 (10th/11th century, Lotharingia, probably Metz) and Vatican, Biblioteca Apostolica Vaticana, Pal. Lat. 582 (10th century, first half, northeast France near Reims, or 9th century, Mainz), similarly point to Lotharingian transmission rather than Reimsian origin.

=== Significance ===
Hunfrid's presence in this manuscript, created shortly after his death and preserved in multiple copies across Francia and Lotharingia, demonstrates that he was recognized as a significant figure in Carolingian royal administration. His appearance in a luxury manuscript likely presented to the emperor indicates he held sufficient importance that his name warranted inclusion in official documents circulated at the highest levels of Carolingian government. The manuscript evidence reveals Hunfrid as part of the complex ecclesiastical and political networks surrounding Charles the Bald's court, operating within the tensions between the major archdioceses of Reims and Sens during a critical period of Carolingian history.

== Death and veneration ==
Hunfrid died on 8 March, 871 at Prüm, three years after his removal from Saint-Bertin. Shortly after his death, he was venerated as a saint, and his cult spread through northern France. His relics were solemnly exhumed on 13 April 1108 by Bishop John of Thérouanne.

His head was enshrined and venerated at Saint-Omer, while other relics were transferred to Ypres in 1553. During the religious conflicts of the Eighty Years' War, these relics were desecrated and burned by anti-Spanish rebels in 1563.

=== Regional saintly veneration ===
The Acta Sanctorum (March 1:789–792), the authoritative Bollandist hagiographic compilation, documents Hunfrid's veneration alongside a cluster of regional saints from the Diocese of Thérouanne. The Audomarenses (canons of Saint-Omer) held a particular devotion to four saints grouped together: Audomarus (feast: 9 September), Erkembode (feast: 12 April), Folquin (feast: 14 September), and Hunfrid (feast: 8 March).

== Artistic depictions ==
=== Reliquary, Arras Cathedral ===
A gilded reliquary casket housed at Arras Cathedral in northern France depicts Saint Hunfrid alongside three other saints of the former Diocese of Thérouanne. Dating to 1850, the reliquary is constructed in the form of a miniature Gothic cathedral with a pitched roof, ornate cresting along the ridge and eaves, and four corner finials topped with orbs. Its surfaces are richly decorated with coloured enamel and cabochon gemstones set in gold mounts, including rubies, sapphires, emeralds, and opals, arranged in rows along the base, roof slope, and decorative friezes. The casket rests on four cast lion-paw feet.

The central front face features a pointed Gothic arch containing a glazed oval ostensorium, through which the relic is visible alongside a label reading "OSSA VEDAS'', the bones of Saint Vedast, the patron bishop of Arras who baptized Clovis I at the behest of Saint Remigius. Above the ostensorium, a Latin inscription in a pointed gable reads "BEATA VEDARTE INTERCEDE PRO NOBIS" ("Blessed Vedast, intercede for us"). The rear and side panels display relief carvings of saints beneath Gothic arcading.

The four painted panels flanking the central ostensorium depict, from left to right: Sanctus Maximus, Sanctus Audomarus (Saint Omer), Sanctus Folquinus, and Sanctus Hunfridus. Each figure is shown in episcopal vestments with a halo, rendered in the historicist painting style characteristic of mid-nineteenth century French religious art. Hunfrid occupies the rightmost panel, depicted in his role as Bishop of Thérouanne. The grouping of Audomarus, Folquin, and Hunfrid on this reliquary directly mirrors their clustering in the Acta Sanctorum and in the stained-glass program of Notre-Dame Cathedral, Saint-Omer, reflecting a continuous tradition of regional saintly veneration in the former diocese spanning from the early medieval period to the nineteenth century.

=== Stained-glass window, Notre-Dame Cathedral, Saint-Omer ===
A major hagiographic stained-glass window in Bay 14 depicting scenes from the lives of Saint Hunfrid, Folquin, and Erkembode is located in the Saint Omer Chapel of the ambulatory of the Notre-Dame Parish Church (formerly Collegiate Church, then Cathedral) in Saint-Omer, Pas-de-Calais, France.

The window was executed between 1872 and 1875 by Antoine Lusson, after designs by the noted draughtsman Louis-Charles-Auguste Steinheil (1814–1885). It measures approximately 4.00 metres in height and 0.80 metres in width, and is constructed of painted and grisaille glass in a Gothic ogival bay with three historiated panels separated by complex quatrefoil ornamental roundels, with a vegetal border and geometric background ornament.

The window depicts Hunfrid in the uppermost historiated panel, accompanied by the inscription S: HUNFRIDUS, shown being consecrated as Bishop of Thérouanne. Folquin appears in the central panel, and Erkembode occupies the lower historiated panel. The three saints share the window in the same order in which they are grouped in the liturgical and hagiographic tradition of the region.

The window forms part of a series of five hagiographic windows in the Saint Omer Chapel, collectively depicting scenes from the lives of Saints Humfride, Folquin, Erkembode, Maxime, Lugle, Luglien, and Omer, a comprehensive visual program of the major saints of the former Diocese of Thérouanne. The entire series was registered as a protected heritage object by the French Ministry of Culture on 13 June 1980 (reference PM62002382) and is held by the municipality of Saint-Omer. The church itself has been listed as a French Historical Monument since 1840.

== Literature ==
- L. Humphrey: Hunfrid von Prüm: Mönch, Bischof und Heiliger in: Der Prümer Landbote. Zeitschrift des Geschichtsvereins "Prümer Land", Die Westeifel in Geschichte und Gegenwart, 170/26, p. 26-28, Prüm, 2026.
