= Drogo =

Drogo (French: Dreux or Drogon, diminutive Drouet; Italian: Drogone) is a male given name of Germanic origin.

The etymology of the name is disputed, possibly from Proto-Germanic *draugiz ("hard, solid"). It has also been linked to Old Saxon drog ("ghost") or Old High German tragen ("to carry"). It may have been borrowed into Germanic from Slavic dorogo ("dear").

== People ==
Ordered chronologically.

- Drogo of Champagne (670–708), Duke of Champagne
- Drogo (mayor of the palace) (c. 730–?), Merovingian mayor of the palace of Austrasia
- Drogo of Metz (801–855), Bishop of Metz and illegitimate son of Charlemagne
- Drogo (872–873), son of Charles the Bald
- Drogo (bishop of Minden) (died 902)
- Drogo (bishop of Toul) (died 921)
- Drogo, Duke of Brittany (died 958), also Count of Vannes
- Drogo (bisop of Osnabrück) (died 967)
- Drogo of Mantes (996–1035), Count of the Véxin
- Drogo of Hauteville (c. 1010–1051), Count of Apulia and Calabria
- Drogo of Saint-Winnoc (11th century), hagiographer
- Drogo of Boves (11th century), lord of Boves
- Drogo (bishop of Thérouanne) (r. 1030–1078)
- Drogo Fitz Pons (fl. 1086), uncle of Richard Fitz Pons
- Drogo de la Beuvrière (disappeared c. 1087), an associate of William the Conqueror and first lord of Holderness
- Drogo of Nesle (fl. 11th century), a participant in the First Crusade
- Drogo of Moncy (died 1101), crusader
- Drogo of Montaigu (died 1125), companion of William the Conqueror at Hastings
- Drogo (archbishop of Lyon) (r. 1163–1166)
- Saint Drogo (1105–c. 1185), French hermit
- Drogo of Amiens (died 1194/1195), castellan and crusader
- Drogo IV of Mello (died 1218), constable of France
- Drogo V of Mello (died 1249), crusader
- Drogo de Barentyn (died 1264/1265), English seneschal of Gascony
- Drouet de Dammartin (died 1413), sculptor and architect
- Dreux Budé (died 1476), secretary of Charles VII and Louis XI of France

== Transport ==
- Piero Drogo, Italian coachbuilder and car driver
  - Ferrari 250 GT Drogo
- Ferdinand Le Drogo, French road bicycle racer
- Paul Le Drogo, French road bicycle racer

== Fiction ==
- Khal Drogo, the Dothraki lord who weds Daenerys Targaryen in George R. R. Martin's A Song of Ice and Fire series
- Drogo Baggins, father of Frodo Baggins in J.R.R Tolkien's The Lord of The Rings

== Other uses ==
- Castle Drogo, a mansion house in Devon, England
- Drogo Sacramentary, a Carolingian illuminated manuscript from c. 850 AD

== See also ==
- Drogon (disambiguation)
- Dogo (disambiguation)
- Drongo
- Diogo (disambiguation)
- Darga
