= Auchy-lès-Hesdin =

- Commune
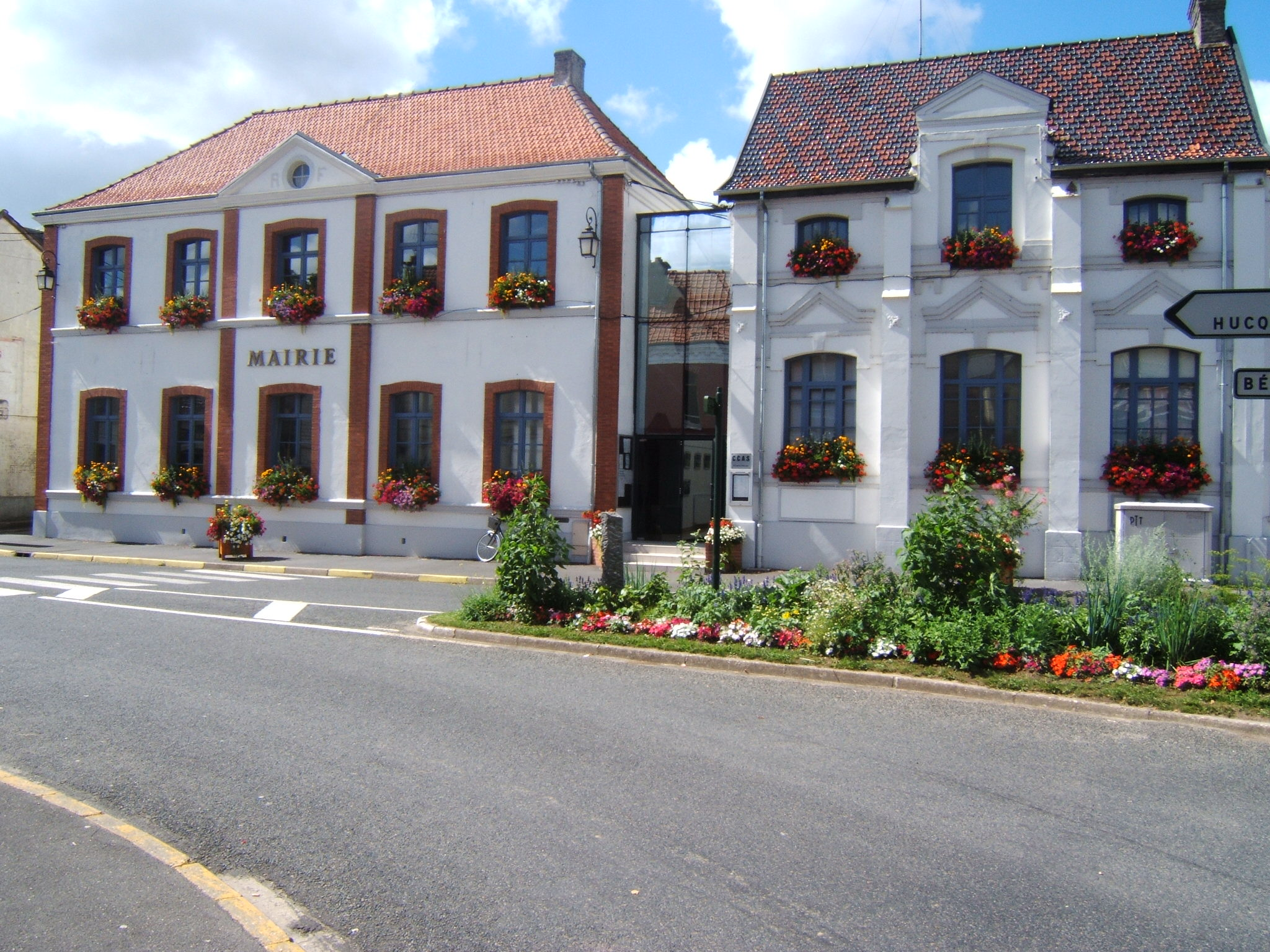
- The town hall of Auchy-lès-Hesdin

- Coat of arms
- Location of Auchy-lès-Hesdin
- Location within France Location within Hauts-de-France
- Coordinates: 50°23′54″N 2°06′11″E
- Country: France
- Region: Hauts-de-France
- Department: Pas-de-Calais
- Arrondissement: Montreuil
- Canton: Auxi-le-Château
- Intercommunality: CC des 7 Vallées

Government
  - Mayor (2020–2026): Franck Parmentier
- Area^{1}: 9.61 km^{2} (3.71 sq mi)
- Elevation: 33 m (108 ft)
- Highest elevation: 122 m (400 ft)
- Lowest elevation: 30 m (98 ft)
- Population (2023): 1,513
  - Density: 157/km^{2} (408/sq mi)
- Time zone: UTC+01:00 (CET)
  - Summer (DST): UTC+02:00 (CEST)
- INSEE/Postal code: 62050 /62770
- ^{1} French Land Register data, which excludes lakes, ponds, glaciers > 1 km^{2} (0.386 sq mi or 247 acres) and river estuaries.

Auchy-lès-Hesdin (French pronunciation: [oʃi lɛz‿edɛ̃], literally Auchy near Hesdin) is a commune in the Pas-de-Calais department and Hauts-de-France region of France.

== Geography ==
Auchy is situated on the D94 some 29 km (18 mi) east-southeast of Montreuil-sur-Mer on the banks of the Ternoise, a tributary of the river Canche.

== History ==
Formerly called Auchy-les-Moines, the village owes its origin to the monastery founded by Saint Sylvain, who came here from Toulouse in 700. Destroyed by the Normans, the monastery was rebuilt in the 11th century by the Counts of Hesdin, and entrusted to the Benedictine monks of St Bertin (see Saint-Omer) in 1072.

== Population ==
Historical population
Year	Pop.	±% p.a.
1968	1,861	—
1975	1,944	+0.63%
1982	1,814	−0.98%
1990	1,720	−0.66%
1999	1,759	+0.25%
2007	1,756	−0.02%
2012	1,663	−1.08%
2017	1,571	−1.13%
2023	1,513	−0.63%
Source: INSEE

== Sights ==
=== The abbey church ===
The pillars of the nave and the first span of the choir date back to the middle of the 12th century, the last two sections of the choir around 1200. They are the only remnants of the original church, which had to be almost entirely rebuilt after its collapse in 1280.
In 1415, several of the knights killed at Agincourt were buried here, including the Admiral of France, Jacques de Châtillon. Two decades later, the constant state of war forced the monks to desert the abbey, where they returned in 1457. Pillaged and burned by troops on several occasions during the 16th century, the buildings of the monastery were restored in the early 17th century. They were used as a textile mill after the Revolution and, with the exception of the abbey church, were finally destroyed by a fire in 1834.

=== Weir ===
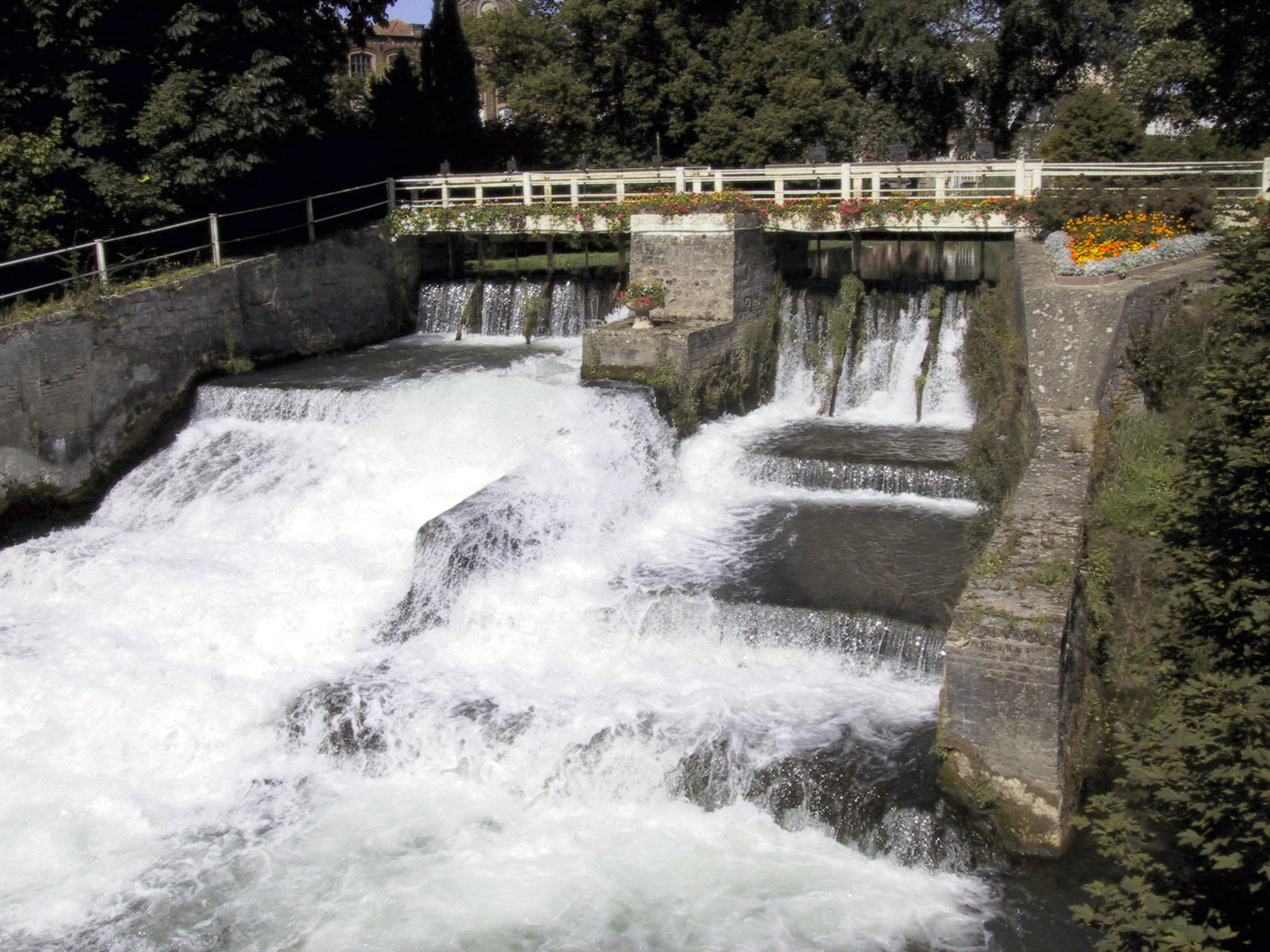
Weir on the River Ternoise

A large and impressive weir on the river is a tourist attraction.

== See also ==
- Communes of the Pas-de-Calais department
