= Thérouanne =

Thérouanne Terenburg
- Commune
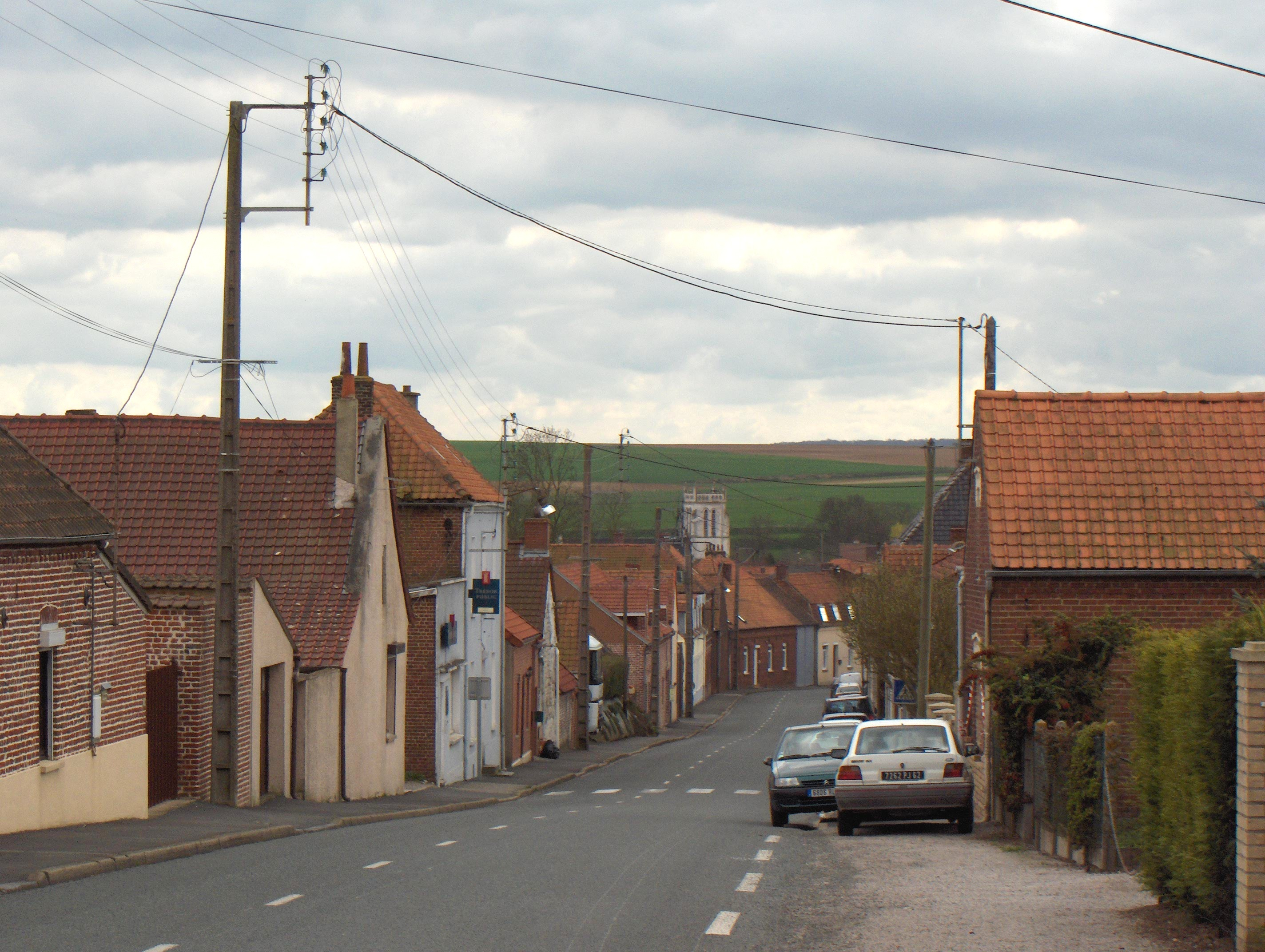
- The centre of Thérouanne

- Coat of arms
- Location of Thérouanne
- Location within France Location within Hauts-de-France
- Coordinates: 50°38′15″N 2°15′35″E
- Country: France
- Region: Hauts-de-France
- Department: Pas-de-Calais
- Arrondissement: Saint-Omer
- Canton: Fruges
- Intercommunality: Pays de Saint-Omer

Government
  - Mayor (2020–2026): Alain Chevalier
- Area^{1}: 8.37 km^{2} (3.23 sq mi)
- Elevation: 38 m (125 ft)
- Highest elevation: 116 m (381 ft)
- Lowest elevation: 31 m (102 ft)
- Population (2023): 1,146
  - Density: 137/km^{2} (355/sq mi)
- Time zone: UTC+01:00 (CET)
  - Summer (DST): UTC+02:00 (CEST)
- INSEE/Postal code: 62811 /62129
- ^{1} French Land Register data, which excludes lakes, ponds, glaciers > 1 km^{2} (0.386 sq mi or 247 acres) and river estuaries.

Thérouanne ([teʁ.wan]; West Flemish: Terenburg; Dutch Terwaan) is a commune in the Pas-de-Calais department in the Hauts-de-France region of France 10 km (6.2 mi) west of Aire-sur-la-Lys and 13 km (8.1 mi) south of Saint-Omer, on the river Lys.

== Population ==
Historical population
Year	Pop.	±% p.a.
1968	877	—
1975	886	+0.15%
1982	943	+0.89%
1990	971	+0.37%
1999	1,045	+0.82%
2007	1,054	+0.11%
2012	1,104	+0.93%
2017	1,115	+0.20%
2023	1,146	+0.46%
Source: INSEE

== History ==
At the time of the Gauls, Tarwanna or Tervanna was the capital of the Belgian tribe of the Morini. After the Romans conquered Gaul, they too made the city the capital of the Civitas Morinorum district.

The origin of the name has several theories. According to the historian Malbracq, it got its name from its founder "Lucius Tauruannus", others say it is derived from "Terra avanae" The land of Oats. But this second derivation seems to be a generic used term.

In the 7th century, probably around 639, Saint Audomar (Saint Omer) established the bishopric of Terwaan or Terenburg, the diocese of Thérouanne, which during the Middle Ages controlled a large part of the left bank of the river Scheldt. Territorially it was part of the county of Artois which belonged to the county of Flanders. In 1303 the town was burnt by Flemish forces during the Franco-Flemish War.

Thanks to that ecclesiastical control of some of the most prosperous cities north of the Alps, like Arras and Ypres, the bishopric was able to build Thérouanne Cathedral, which was at the time the largest in France.

The town was captured by the Emperor Maximilian and Henry VIII from the French in 1513 after the Battle of the Spurs. In 1553 Charles V besieged Thérouanne, then a French enclave in the Holy Roman Empire, in revenge for a defeat by the French at the siege of Metz. After he captured the city he ordered it to be razed, the roads to be broken up, and the area to be ploughed and salted. Only a small commune which lay outside the city walls, then named Saint-Martin-Outre-Eaux, was left standing, and later (probably around 1800) took over the name Thérouanne. Part of the portal of the cathedral was acquired by Saint-Omer Cathedral; a colossal statue of Christ sitting in judgement, le Grand Dieu de Thérouanne, is all that is left of it.

The disappearance of the former bishopric led to a reform of sees at the Council of Trent, and the bishopric of Thérouanne was split between those of Saint-Omer and Ypres.

Thérouanne lies on the Via Francigena.

=== Bishops ===
- Saint Audomar, founder, 637-c.670
- Hunfrid of Prüm (d. 871)
- A certain Adam, 1213–1229 List of religious leaders in 1220
- Antipope Clement VII, 1361–1368
- John, Cardinal of Lorraine (d. 1550)
- The ruins of the Abbey of St. Jean-du-Mont contain the remnants of the Gothic cathedral which has a seventh-century episcopal group and a Carolingian building, which are a registered historical monument.

== Twin towns ==
Thérouanne is twinned with Hamstreet in Kent (in southern England, across the English Channel).

== Notable people ==
- Gérard Houllier, football manager, was born in Thérouanne.
- Hugh of Falkenberg (died c. 1106), crusader.

== In literature ==
- The town appears as Taruenna in a novel about an English pilgrimage to Rome by Matthew Kneale.
- In Hilary Mantel's novel Wolf Hall the first conversation between the central character Thomas Cromwell and Henry VIII, about the futility of war, sees Henry chide Cromwell for describing Thérouanne as a 'dog hole' in a speech in parliament opposing funds for a new expedition in France.

== See also ==
- Communes of the Pas-de-Calais department
- Ancient Diocese of Thérouanne
