= Drogon =

Drogon may refer to:

== People ==
- Drogon, the name of several medieval individuals, which is typically spelled "Drogo" in English; see Drogo (disambiguation)
- Drogön Chögyal Phagpa, the fifth leader of the Sakya school of Tibetan Buddhism

== Arts, entertainment, and media ==
- Drogon (Game of Thrones), one of the three dragons hatched by Daenerys Targaryen in the Game of Thrones franchise
- Drogon, one of the three dragons hatched by Daenerys Targaryen in the A Song of Ice and Fire books by George R. R. Martin
- Drogon, the debut novel of Arthur van Schendel

== Other uses ==
- Drogon (software), a C++14/17-based HTTP application framework
- Pseudocalotes drogon, Drogon’s false garden lizard, a species of agamid lizard, found in Malaysia

== See also ==
- Dragon
- Drogen
- Droggn
- Drogoman
- Drogoniów
- Dorgon
