= Abbey of Saint Bertin =

Abbey in Pas-de-Calais, France

- Abbaye Saint-Bertin
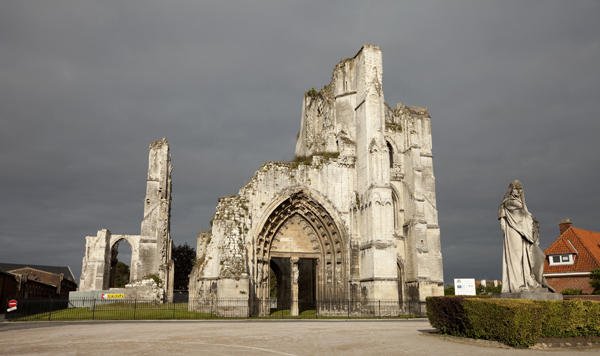
- Ruins of the abbey

- Location within France

Monastery information
- Other name: Abbey of Sithiu
- Order: Order of Saint Benedict
- Established: 7th century
- Disestablished: 1791

Architecture
- Heritage designation: Monument historique
- Designated date: 1840

Site
- Location: Saint-Omer, France
- Coordinates: 50.7507°N 2.264°E

The Abbey of Saint Bertin was a Benedictine monastic abbey in Saint-Omer, France. The buildings are now in ruins, which are open to the public. It was initially dedicated to Saint Peter but was rededicated to its second abbot, Saint Bertin. The abbey is known for its Latin cartulary (Chartularium Sithiense) whose first part is attributed to Folcwin.

The abbey was founded on the banks of the Aa in the 7th century by Bishop Audomar of Thérouanne, who is now better known as Saint Omer. He sent the monks Bertin, Momelin, and Ebertram from Sithiu (now St-Omer) to proselytize among the pagans in the region. The abbey soon became one of the most influential monasteries in northern Europe and ranked in importance with Elnon (now St-Amand Abbey) and St. Vaast. Its library included the codex of the Leiden Aratea, from which two copies were made. The Annals of St Bertin are an important source of the history of 9th-century France.

Already in the 9th century, the abbey had a priory in Poperinge. A Romanesque church was constructed in the mid-11th century. It was 25 m (82 ft) high with a 48-metre-high (157 ft) tower. It included a large 14th-century semi-circular sanctuary with five side-chapels. It served as a model for the church, whose construction was not completed until the beginning of the 16th century.

By the eleventh century it was one of the most important abbeys in the area, and represented the Flemish dynasty. Its importance rested in no small part on having the body of Silvin of Auchy, whose body had been stolen by Arnulf I and moved to Saint-Bertin; he, along with the saints Folcwin, Bertin, and Winnoc were essential to the foundational identity of the abbey. The abbey was also closely associated with the abbey of Saint-Silvain in Auchy, and had strict control over the election of that abbey's abbot. The reference to the theft of Silvin's body was whitewashed: a twelfth-century copy of Folcuin's Gesta abbatum Sancti Bertini, "Deeds of the Abbots of Saint-Bertin", makes no mention of it.

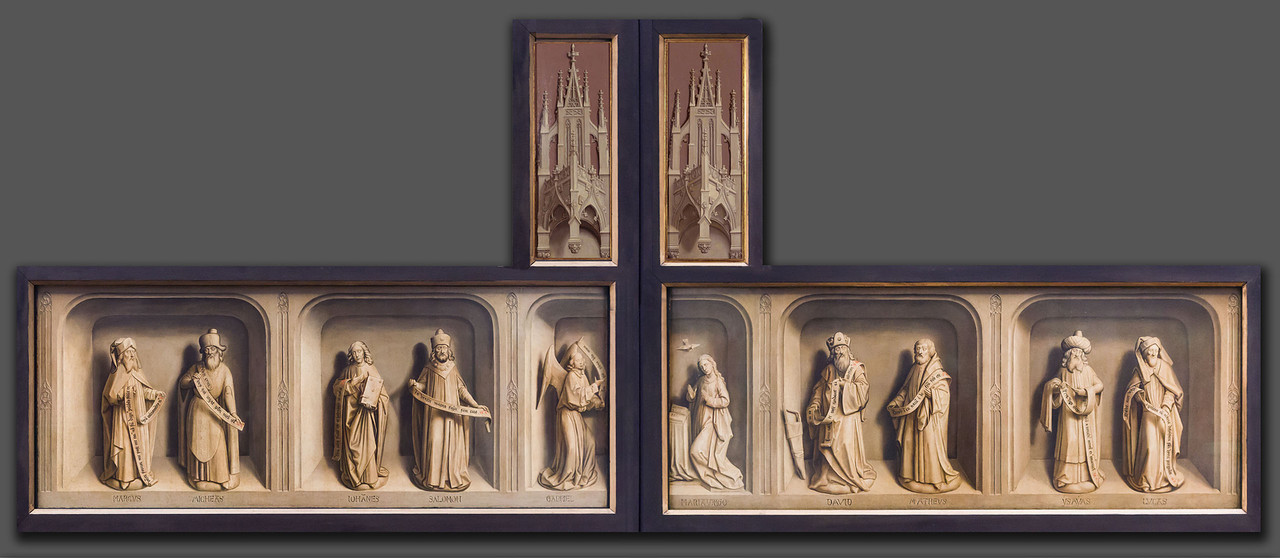
Reconstitution de l'extérieur du retable de Saint-Bertin.

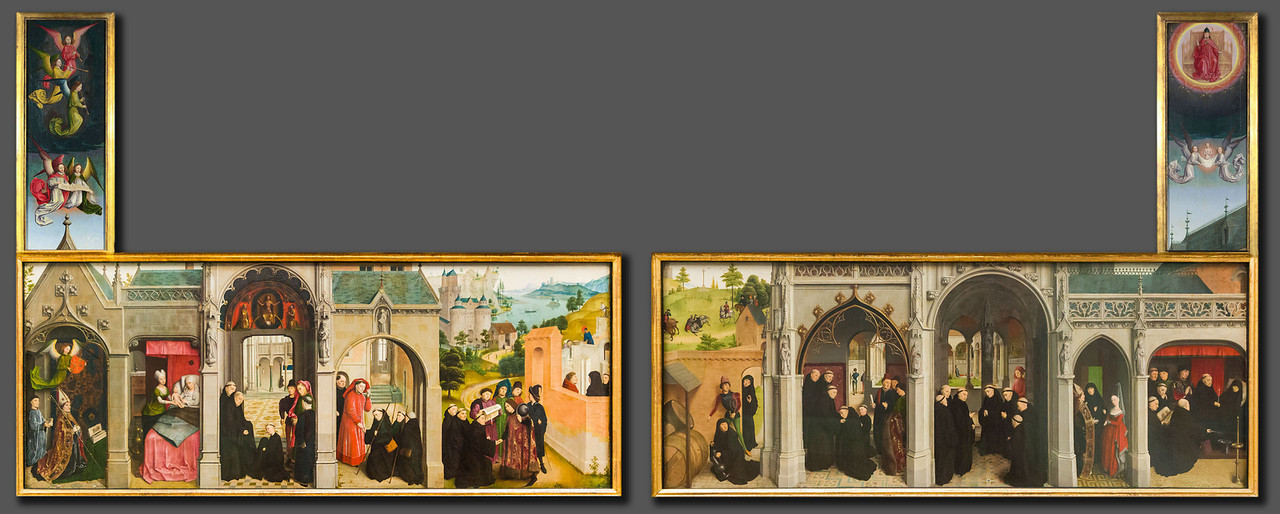
Reconstitution de l'intérieur du retable de Saint-Bertin.

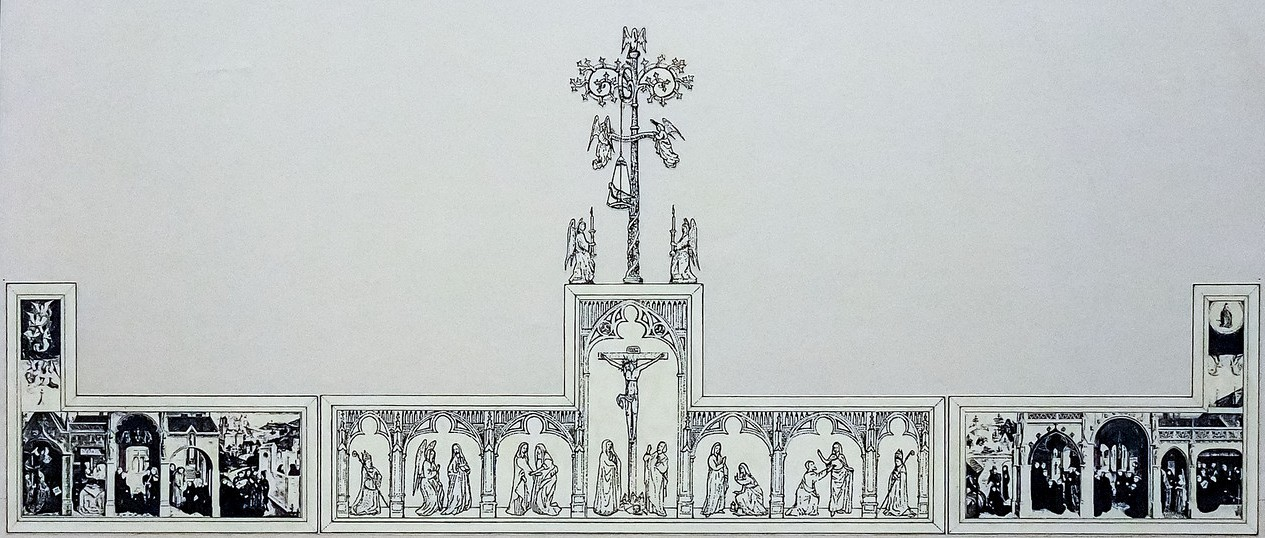
Reconstitution de Retable de Saint-Bertin

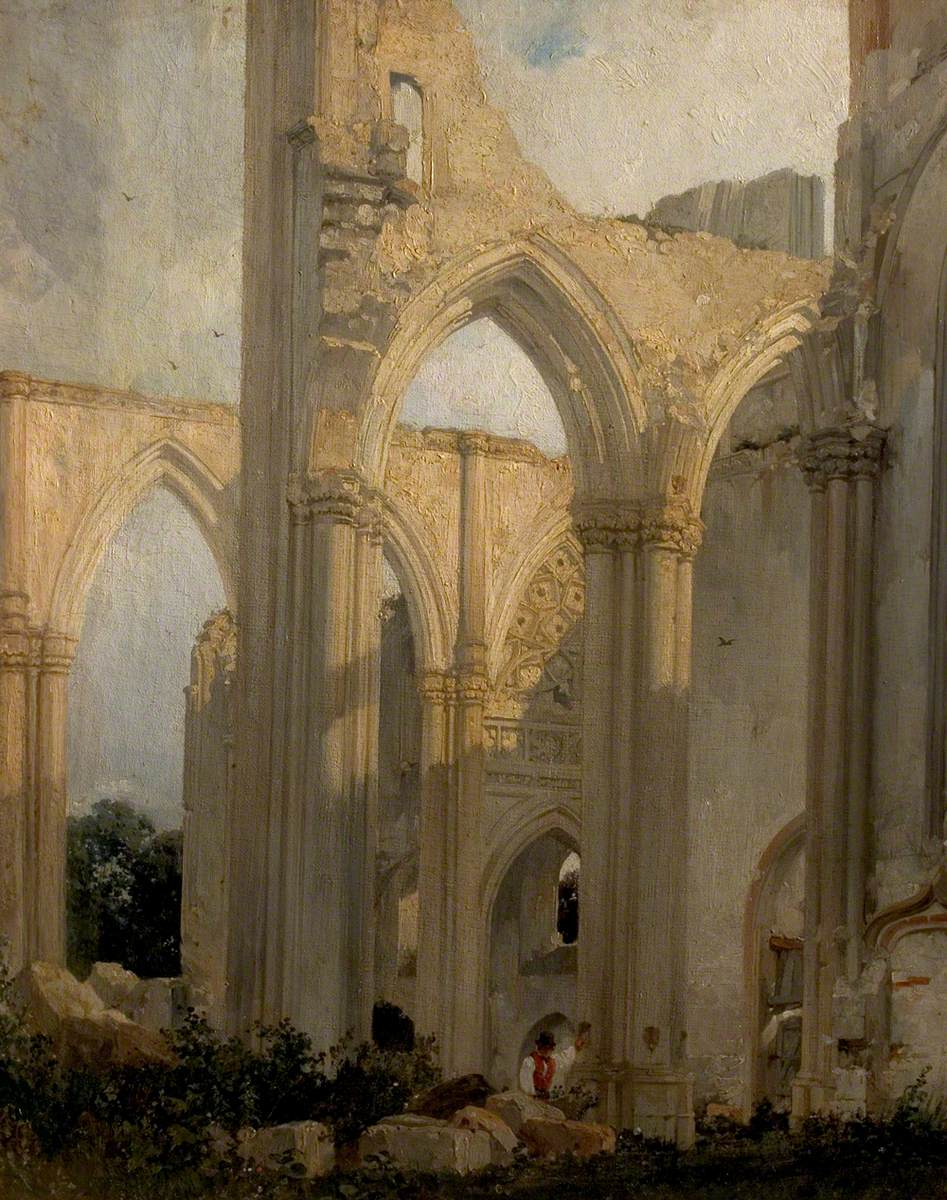
Ruins of the Abbey Saint Bertin by Richard Parkes Bonington, 1824

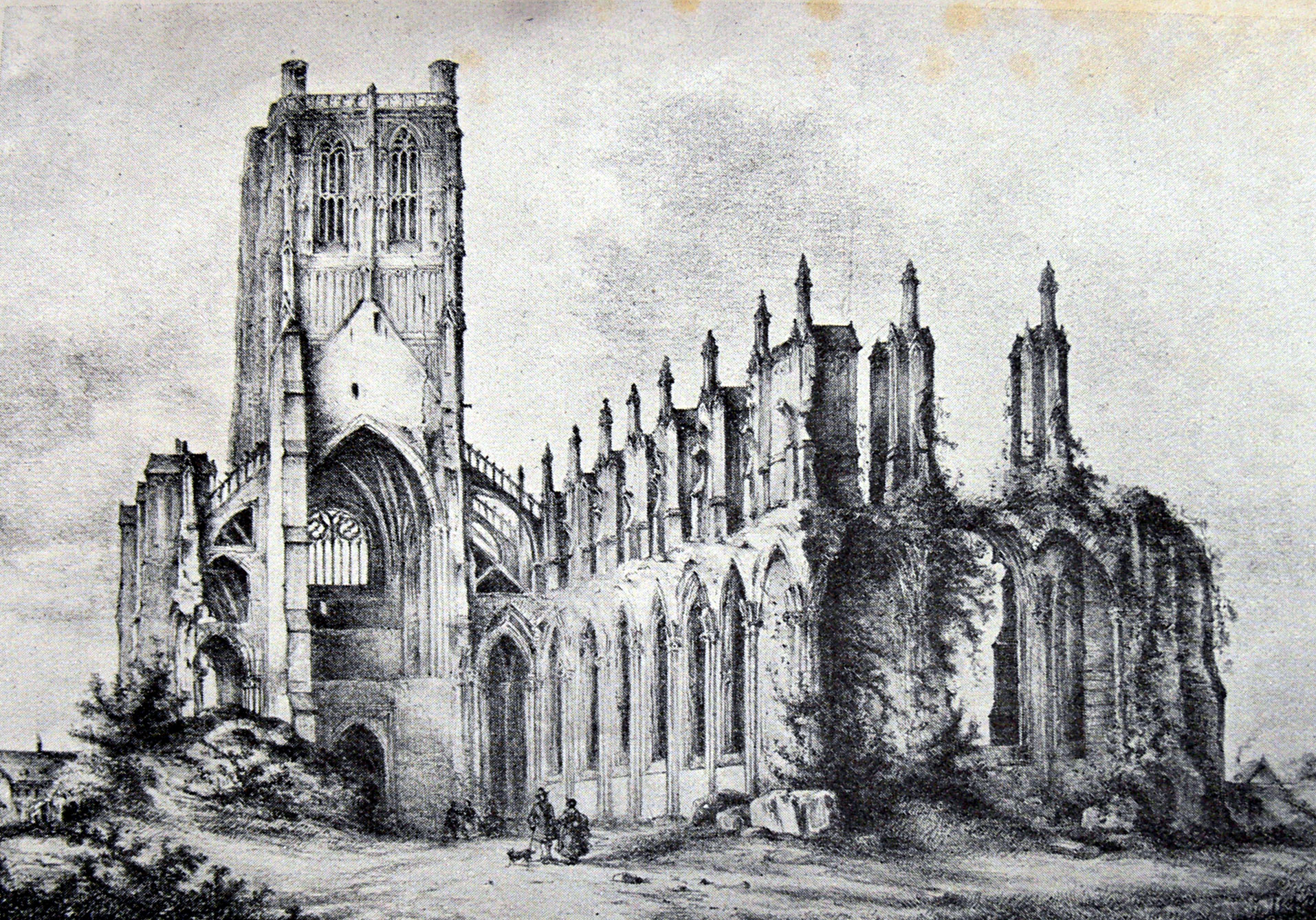
1850 lithograph of the Ruins of the Abbey

Bishop Herman of Ramsbury was a monk at the abbey from 1055 to 1058, having abandoned his duties but not his title, which he resumed upon his election as bishop of Sherborne. From 1106, the abbey had the right of appointing the priests at Lissewege and Ruiselede. William Clito was buried here in 1128. The abbey had a 'refuge-house' in the now-demolished Sint-Lodewijkscollege in Bruges.

The abbey ceased to flourish after the 13th century, although it survived until its closure during the French Revolution. In 1830, the commune ordered the demolition of the church, though they spared the tower. The buttress they erected to support it is still visible, although the tower itself collapsed in 1947 owing to damage sustained in the shelling of the town during World War II. St-Omer's town hall was constructed with stone removed from the site in 1834.

Outside the abbey is a marble statue of Suger by Jean-Baptiste Stouf, one of twelve statues installed in the Palace of Versailles in 1836. When it was decided in 1931 that the statues be moved to the birth places of their representatives, Suger's was moved to Saint-Omer from a local legend that he was born there.

== List of abbots ==
- 638–659 — Mummolin I
- 655–700 — Bertin
- 700–??? — Rigobert
- Erlefred
- 712 — Erkembode
- c. 745 — Waimar
- Nantharius I
- Dadbert
- Hardrad
- 795–804 — Odland
- 804–820 — Nantharius II
- 820–834 — Fridugisus
- 834–844 — Hugh I
- 844–859 — Adalard (first time)
- 859–881 — Hugh II
- 861–864 — Adalard (second time)
- 864–866 — Hunfrid I
- 866–878 — Hilduin
- 878–883 — Fulk the Venerable (first time)
- 884–892 — Rudolf
- 893–900 — Fulk the Venerable (second time)
- The following were abbots in commendam:
  - 900–918 Baldwin II, Margrave of Flanders
  - 918–933 Adelolf, Count of Boulogne
  - 933–958 Arnulf I, Count of Flanders
  - 958–962 Baldwin III, Count of Flanders
  - 965–987 Arnulf II, Count of Flanders
- 944–947 — Gérard of Brogne
- 947–950 — Guy
- 950–954 — Hildebrand (first time)
- 954–961 — Ragenold
- 961–962 — Adolf
- 962–971 — Hildebrand (second time)
- 973–984 — Walter I
- 985–986 — Trutgaud
- 986–1007 — Odbert
- 1008–1021 — Hunfrid II
- 1021–1043 — Roderic
- 1043–1065 — Bovo
- 1065–1081 — Heribert
- 1081–1095 — John I
- 1095–1124 — Lambert
- 1124–1131 — John II of Furnes
- 1131–1136 — Simon I of Ghent
- 1138–1163 — Leo of Saint-Bertin
- 1163–1176 — Godescal
- 1176–1186 — Simon II
- 1186–1230 — John III of Ypres
- 1230–1237 — Jacques I of Furnes
- 1237–1249 — Simon III of Ghent
- 1249–1264 — Gilbert
- 1265–1268 — Jacques II
- 1268–1271 — Guillaume I d'Oye
- 1271–1278 — Jean IV Dubois
- 1278–1294 — Walter II Bloc
- 1294–1297 — Eustache Gomer
- 1297–1311 — Gilles d'Oignies
- 1311–1334 — Henri de Coudescure
- 1334–1365 — Aleaume Boistel
- 1365–1383 — Jean V le Long
- 1383–1407 — Jacques III de Condète
- 1407–1420 — Jean VI de Blicquère
- 1420–1425 — Alard Trubert
- 1425–1447 — Jean VII de Griboval
- 1447–1450 — Jean VIII de Medon
- 1450/1–1473 — Guillaume Fillastre
- 1473–1492 — Jean IX Launay
- 1492–1493 — Jacques IV Duval
- 1493–1531 — Antoine I de Berghes
- 1531–1544 — Angelbert d'Espagne
- 1544–1571 — Gérard II de Haméricourt
- 1571–1583 — vacancy
- 1583–1603 — Waast de Grenet
- 1604–1611 — Nicolas Mainfroy
- 1612–1623 — Guillaume III Loemel
- 1623–1631 — Philippe Gillocq
- 1631–1641 — vacancy
- 1641–1650 — Antoine II Laurin
- 1650–1674 — François I de Lières
- 1674–1677 — François II Boucault
- 1677–1705 — Benoît I de Béthune des Plancques
- 1706–1723 — Mommelin II Le Riche
- 1723–1723 — Guillaume IV Dubois
- 1723–1744 — Benoît II Petit Pas
- 1744–1763 — Charles de Gherboode d'Espaing
- 1764–1774 — Antoine III Clériade de Choiseul-Beaupré
- 1774–1791 — Joscio d'Allesnes
