= Erkembode =

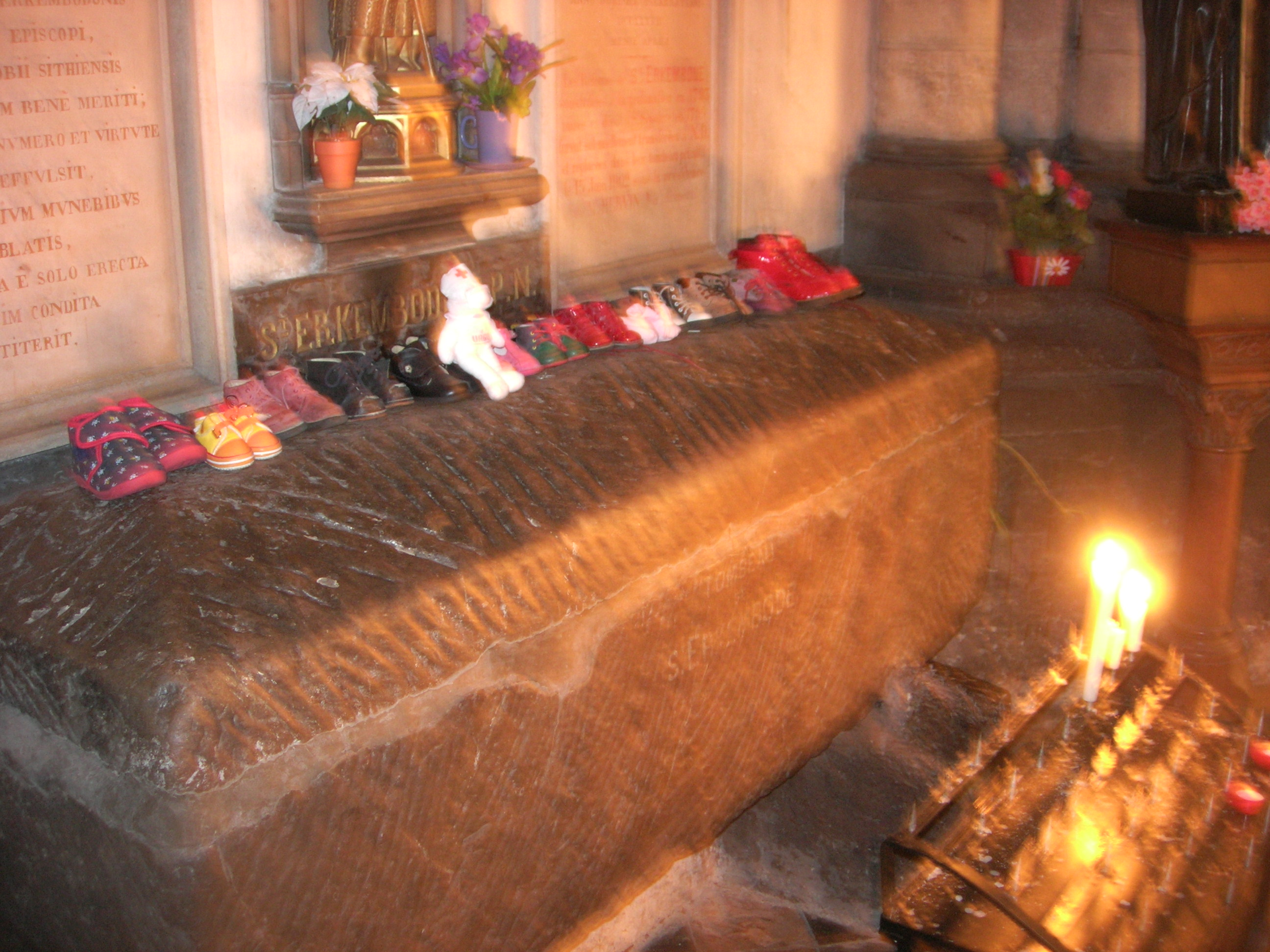
Tiny pairs of shoes on Saint Erkembode's tomb in Saint-Omer Cathedral.

Of the early life of Erkembode, who lived in the late 7th and first half of the 8th centuries, nothing is known. It has been surmised that he was an Irish monk who travelled with several companions to Sithiu, now Saint-Omer in northern France where he lived in the monastery.

He was a disciple of the abbot at Sithiu, saint Bertin († c.709), himself a disciple of saint Columbanus of Luxeuil, the Celtic abbey in the French Vosges mountains. Later Erkembode was elected by the clergy and people as bishop of Thérouanne, while remaining abbot of his abbey. In later times that abbey of Sithiu became part of the Order of Saint Benedict after the Carolingian reforms of Benedict of Aniane.

Erkembode, means "recognised envoy" The region is now called French Flanders. The name of the see of Erkembode, Thérouanne, was already quoted as the capital of the Morini by Julius Caesar in his Gallic Wars.

After 26 years of episcopacy, in a diocese that extended far into the mainland, Erkembode died on 12 April, though the exact year is unknown. and was buried in Saint-Omer Cathedral, where his tomb remains.

== Veneration ==
The diocese of Therouanne was immense: it went from the current Belgium (Ypres) to the Valley of the Somme. Consequently, Erkembode traveled widely. Initially, pilgrims to his tomb left their shoes as ex votos in testament to their own travels. In modern times visitors to his shrine include the parents of crippled children, who leave pairs of children's shoes on the saint's tomb, invoking Erkembode's intercessions for the healing of their children. The older shoes are periodically cleared away by the cathedral authorities.

Erkembode's liturgical feast day is 12 April.

An early vita by Jean Lelong, called Joannes Iperius, a 14th-century Abbot of St-Bertin, is published in Acta Sanctorum.
