= Mummolin of Noyon =

French monk and saint

Saint Mommolin Bishop of Noyon
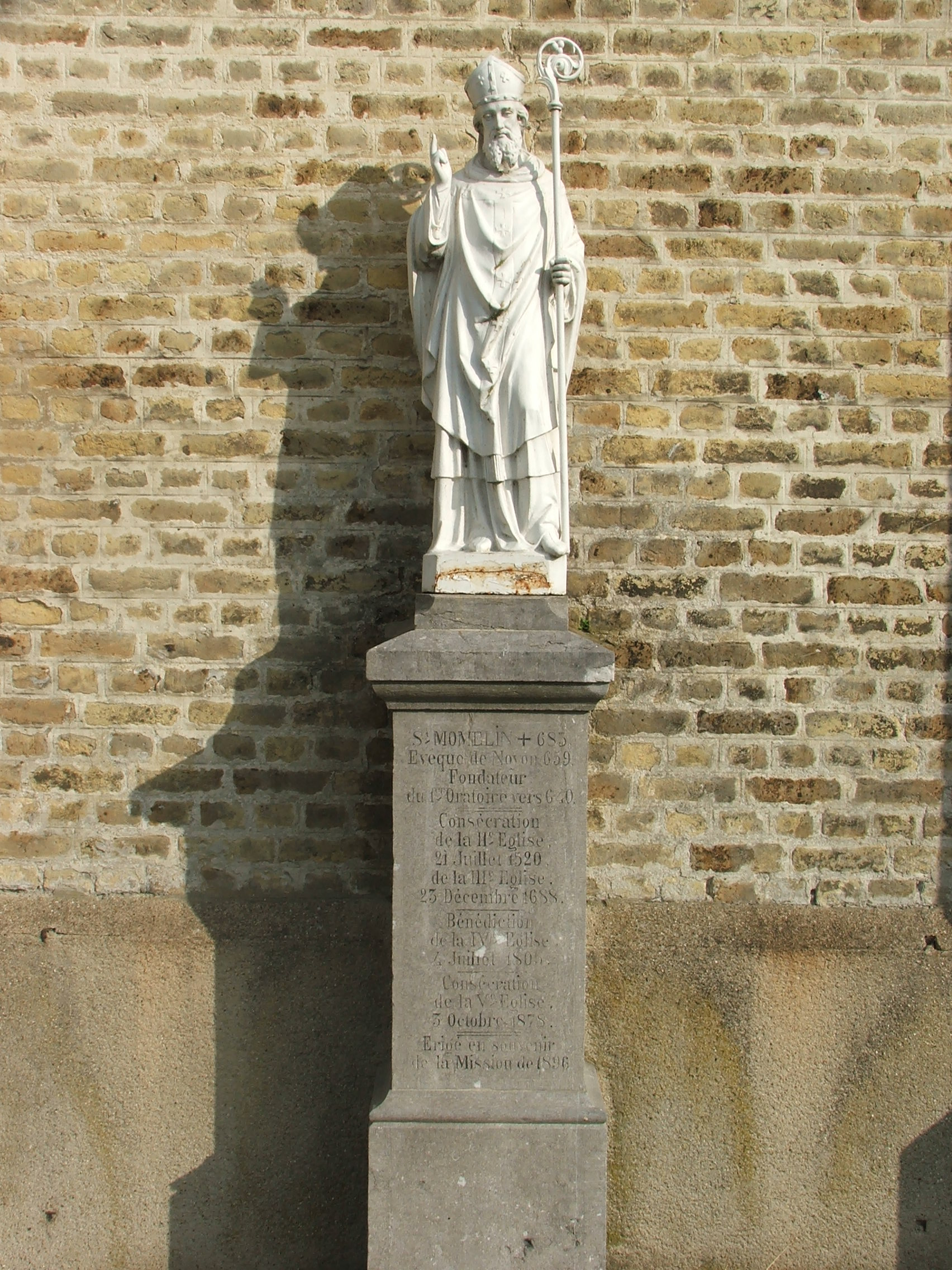
- Statue of Mummolin in Saint-Momelin
- Born: near Lake Constance
- Residence: Noyon
- Died: c. 686
- Feast: 16 October

Saint Mummolin of Noyon (or Mummolinus, Momelin, Mommolenus, Mommolinus, Mommolin; died c. 686) was a monk who became an abbot in Saint-Omer, then Bishop of Noyon-Tournai in Belgium. His feast day is 16 October.

== Life ==
Mommolin was born on the shores of Lake Constance, and became a monk at Luxeuil Abbey in France. He founded and was superior of the old abbey near Saint-Omer, then abbot of the new Sithin Abbey (later Abbey of Saint Bertin) in the same town, and then Bishop of Noyon-Tournai in Belgium. He was a companion of Saint Bertin the Great. He died around 686.

== Hagiography ==
=== Monks of Ramsgate account ===
The monks of St Augustine's Abbey, Ramsgate wrote in their Book of Saints (1921),

Mummolin (St.) Bp. (Oct. 16)
(7th cent.) A French Saint, successor of Saint Eligius or Eloy as Bishop of Noyon. He died A.D. 680 about.

=== Baring-Gould's account ===
Sabine Baring-Gould (1834–1924) in his Lives Of The Saints under October 16 wrote,

S. MUMMOLIN, B. (A.D. 683.) (Gallican and Belgian Martyrologies. Authority:—An early life, written probably in the 8th century.]

S. MUMMOLIN was born on the shores of the Lake of Constance, and spent his early years in the monastery of Luxeuil, under S. Eustasius. When sent forth to preach the Gospel, he went with S. Bertin and S. Ebertram, natives likewise of the shores of Constance, to their countryman, S. Omer, in the land of the Morini, and was gladly received by him. S. Mummolin built a little monastery on a hill rising out of the wide dreary marshes, and became the head of number of disciples. The place becoming too strait for them another site was sought, and found where now stands the city of S. Omer, then called Sithieu.

On the death of S. Eligius, he was elected bishop of Toumai and Noyon. The writer of his life assures us that he spoke fluently both Latin—the Romance tongue afterwards moulded into French—and the Teutonic tongue of the Flemings among whom he laboured. He translated the body of his predecessor, and died in 683, after a life bright with virtues. One portion of his relics are at Toumai, another at Noyon, and some fragments of his skull at S. Mummolin, near Watten, where his first monastery was founded.

=== Butler's account ===
The hagiographer Alban Butler (1710–1773) wrote in his Lives of the Fathers, Martyrs, and Other Principal Saints under October 16,

Saint Mummolin, or Mommolin, Bishop of Noyon, C. He was a native of the territory of Constance, and became a monk at Luxeu. He was sent with Ebartran and Bertin to Saint Omer, and was appointed superior rather than abbot, whilst they lived about eight years in their first habitation called the Old Monastery or Saint Mummolin's. He removed with them to the New Monastery of Saint Peter's or Sithiu, now Saint Bertin's. Upon the death of Saint Eligius, in 659 or 665, he was consecrated bishop of Noyon and Tournay, and constituted Ebertran abbot of the monastery of Saint Quintin's which he erected in that town not far from the ruins of Vermandis. This abbey is long since secularized, and is a famous collegiate church. Folcard tells us in his life of Saint Omer, that Saint Mummolin governed that extensive see twenty-six years. His name occurs in the subscriptions to the Testament of Saint Amand, and to several charters of that age. His body was interred in the church of the apostles, and is now richly enshrined in the cathedral of Noyon, but part of his skull at Saint Bertin's. He is honoured in all these dioceses on the 16th of October.

== Sources ==
- Baring-Gould, Sabine (1897), The Lives Of The Saints, vol. 12, October, Pt. 2, London: J. C. Nimmo This article incorporates text from this source, which is in the public domain.
- Butler, Alban (1833), The Lives of the Fathers, Martyrs, and Other Principal Saints, vol. 2, Coyne This article incorporates text from this source, which is in the public domain.
- "Saint Mummolinus of Noyon", CatholicSaints.info, 16 October 2013
- St. Augustine's Abbey, Ramsgate (1921), The Book of saints : a dictionary of servants of God canonized by the Catholic Church, London: A. & C. Black, ltd. This article incorporates text from this source, which is in the public domain.
