= Folcuin =

French monk and archivist

Folcuin (c. 935 – 16 September 990) was a monk at the abbey of Saint-Bertin, where he was a deacon and archivist, and later abbot of Lobbes. He wrote histories of the abbots of both his monasteries.

The Gesta abbatum Sithiensium (Deeds of the Abbots of Saint-Bertin) is a combination of chronicle and cartulary. Folcuin incorporates numerous charters from the abbey's archives into his historical narrative, which begins with the abbey's foundation around 650 and continues to 961/2. It was composed at the request of the lay abbot, Adalolf.

Folcuin also wrote the Gesta abbatum Lobiensium (Deeds of the Abbots of Lobbes).
