= Audomar =

Bishop of Thérouanne

Saint Audomar
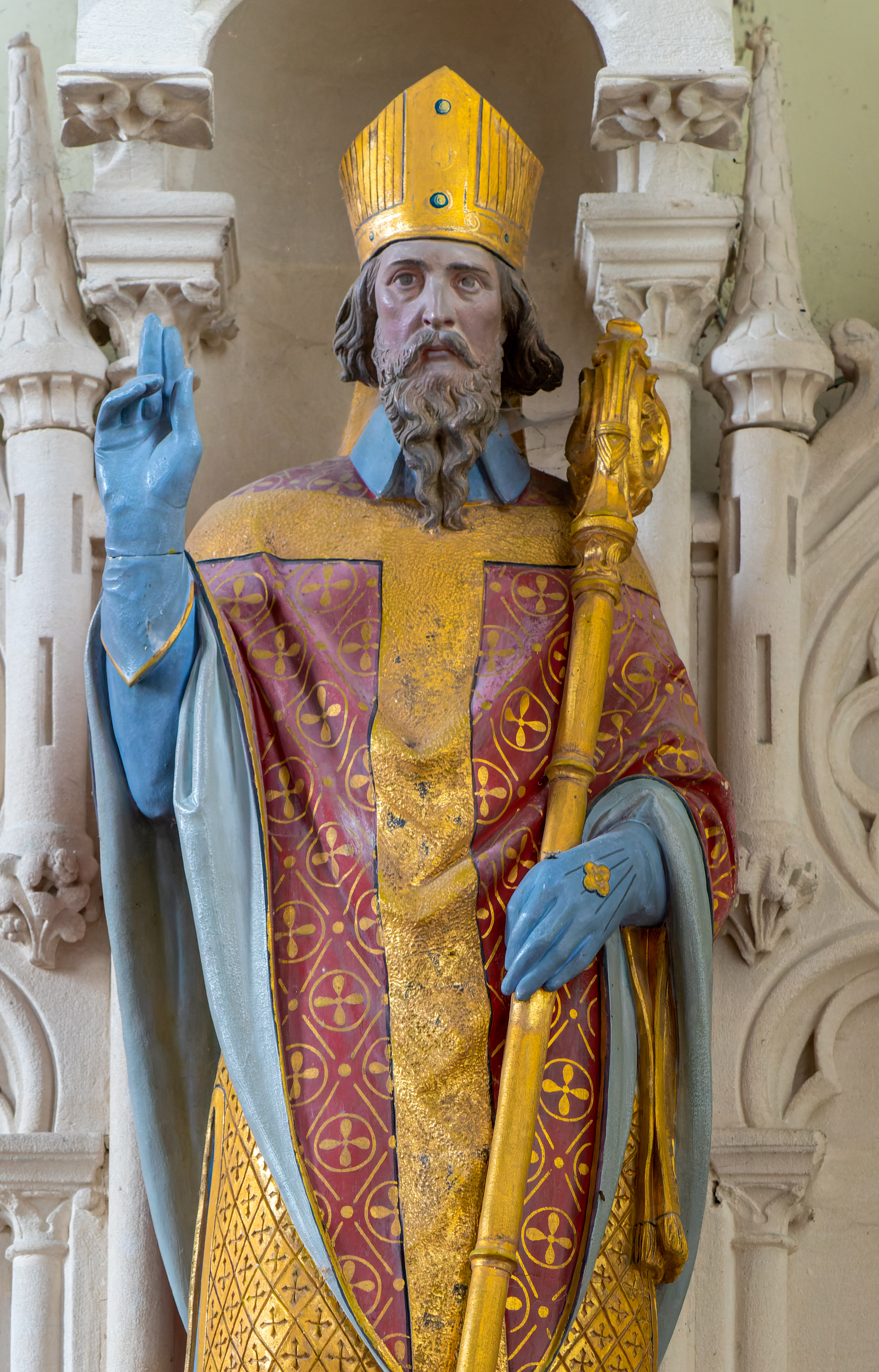
- Statue de Saint Audomar (Omer).
- Born: Neustria
- Died: ~670 AD
- Venerated in: Roman Catholic Church; Eastern Orthodox Church.
- Feast: 9 September

Audomar (died c. 670), better known as Omer, was a bishop of Thérouanne, after whom the nearby Saint-Omer in northern France is named. He is venerated as a saint in the Catholic and Eastern Orthodox churches.

== Biography ==
Audomar was born into a distinguished family of Coutances, then under the Frankish realm of Neustria, towards the close of the 6th or the beginning of the 7th century.

After the death of his mother, he entered with his father the abbey of Luxeuil in the Diocese of Besançon, probably about 615. Under the direction of Eustachius, Omer studied the Scriptures, in which he acquired remarkable proficiency.

When King Dagobert requested the appointment of a bishop for the important city of Thérouanne, the capital of the ancient territory of the Morini in Neustria, he was appointed and consecrated in 637.

Though the Morini had received Christianity from Fuscian and Victoricus, and later Antmund and Adelbert, nearly every vestige of Christianity had disappeared. In 649 or 651, Audomar received twelve estates, including Sithiu where he established three missionaries who came from Austrasia and spoke the local language. The Abbot of Luxeuil sent to his assistance several monks, among whom are mentioned Bertin, Mommolin, and Ebertran.

He founded the Abbey of Saint Peter (now the Abbey of Saint Bertin) in Sithiu, soon to rival the old monastery of Luxeuil for the number of learned and zealous men educated there. In 649 he erected the Church of Our Lady of Sithiu, with a small monastery adjoining, which he turned over to the monks of Saint Bertin, on condition that he would be buried at the site and that the church would serve as a burial place for the monks.

The exact date of his death is unknown, but he is believed to have died about the year 670.

== Veneration ==
The place of his burial is uncertain; most probably he was laid to rest in the church of Our Lady, later Saint-Omer Cathedral, where there is a 13th-century cenotaph dedicated to him.

His feast is celebrated on 9 September.
