= Ancient Diocese of Thérouanne =

Roman Catholic diocese in France (7th century - 1566)

Coordinates: 50.64°N 2.26°E

The former French diocese of Thérouanne (Lat. Moriniensis or Taruannensis) controlled a large part of the left bank of the river Scheldt during the Middle Ages. Territorially it was part of the county of Artois which belonged to the county of Flanders.

== History ==
In the 7th century, probably around 639, Saint Audomar (Saint Omer) established the bishopric of Terwaan or Terenburg in Thérouanne. Thanks to that ecclesiastical control of some of the most prosperous cities north of the Alps, like Arras and Ypres, the bishopric was able to build a cathedral which was at the time the largest in France.

In 1099 the diocese of Thérouanne underwent a particularly wrenching experience. Their bishop, Gerard was denounced to Pope Urban II as a simoniac by the clergy of the diocese. He was unable to explain away the evidence and purge himself of the charge, and therefore he was compelled to resign and retire to the monastery of Saint-Eloi. The Canons of the Cathedral met and elected Erkembodus (Archambaud), Provost of the Cathedral of Saint-Omer as the new bishop. He declined the election. They then elected Aubert de Helcin, one of their own fellow canons, who was also Canon of Amiens. But then Lambert, the Abbot of Saint-Bertin held an election carried out by the clergy and laity of the diocese, which produced Jean de Warneton, who was a Canon of Lille and a religious of the monastery of Saint-Eloi. Abbot Lambert immediately set off for Rome, to have his choice ratified. On 25 April 1099, the third week after Easter, in a Council held in Rome, Pope Urban II quashed the election of Aubert de Helcin and upheld that of Jean de Warneton. Urban II wrote to the Metropolitan, Manasses of Reims, ordering him to have the clergy and people present Bishop-elect Jean to the Bishop of Arras for ordination to the priesthood. Then on 17 July 1099 Manasses himself consecrated Jean a bishop. Manasses was holding a council in Reims at the time, on instructions from Robert, Count of Flanders, to promote the Truce of God.

In 1303, there had been a fire in Thérouanne, as a result of the marauding and pillaging of some nobles and clerks during war in Flanders, which had led to murder and desecration of churches and cemeteries. On 8 March 1304 Pope Benedict IX authorized the Chapter of Thérouanne to use the money left by Bishop Henri de Murs for the establishment for a prebend in the Cathedral for the purpose of repairing the church of Nôtre-Dame which had been damaged in the fire. On the same day he authorized the Bishop to use the first year of income from vacant benefices and prebends for the repair of the Cathedral.

On 20 September 1346 the city of Thérouanne was besieged by the English and burned. Bishop Raimond Saquet was forced to flee and seek safety in Saint-Omer.

In 1553 Charles V besieged Thérouanne, then a French enclave in the Holy Roman Empire, in revenge for a defeat by the French at Metz. After he captured the city he ordered it to be razed to the ground and the roads to be broken up. In 1557, as a result of the war damage to its see, the diocese was abolished. About two decades later the diocese of Boulogne was created, bearing the name Thérouanne for a few years.

The disappearance of the former bishopric led to a reform of sees at the Council of Trent, and the bishopric of Thérouanne was split between the Diocese of Saint-Omer, the diocese of Boulogne and the Diocese of Ypres.

== Bishops ==
=== To 1000 ===
- before 639, to c. 667 (†): Audomar (Omer)
- Draucius
- c. 667 to c. 669/701:Bainus
- c. 669/701 to c. 721/723: Ravengerus
- c. 721/723 to c. 737/742: Erkembodo
- c. 739: Adalgerus
- to before 747: Gumbertus
- 747–748: Aethereus
- Rodwaldus
- Athalphus
- Wigbertus
- before 798 to c. 798: Théoduin
- c. 798 to before 814/817: Grimbaldus
- 817–855 (†): Folcuin
- 856 – 8 March 871: Hunfridus
- 869–872: Actardus
- 872–887: Adalbertus 914
- 887 to c. 900: Herilandus 920
- 909 to c. 935 : Stephan (Etienne)
- 935–959 : Wicfridus
- 959–964 : David
- 964–995 : Framericus
- 995–1030 : Balduin (Baudouin)

=== 1000 to 1300 ===
- 1030–1078: Drogo
- 1078–1081: Hubert
- 1082–1083: Lambert
- 1084–1099: Gérard
- 1099 – 27 January 1130 : Jean de Warneton
- 1130–1158 or 1159: Milon I.
- 1159–1169: Milon II.
- 1169–1191: Didier
- 1191–1207: Lambert de Bruges (Lambert van Brugge)
- 1207–1213: Jean II.
- 1213–1229: Adam de Montreuil
- 1229–1251: Pierre de Doÿ (Doij)
- 1252–1262: Raoul de Chelles
- 1262–1276: Vacant
- 17 October 1276 – 8 April 1286: Henri des Murs (Heinrich von Murs)
- 1287–1301: Jacques de Boulogne

=== 1300–1537 ===
- 1301–1330: Enguerrand de Créqui
- 1330–1334: Johannes III de Vienne
- 1334–1356: Raymond Saquet
- 1356–1361: Gilles II Aycelin de Montaigut, 1357–1358, chancellor of France, based in London
- 3 November 1361 – 11 October 1368: Robert of Geneva (transferred to Cambrai)
- 1368–1371: Gérard de Dainville
- 1371 – 1376, 26 February: Adhémar Roberi
- 1376, May – 19 January 1384: Pierre d'Orgemont (transferred to Paris) (Avignon Obedience)
- 1384–1403: Jean Tabari (Avignon Obedience)
- 1404–1414: Matthieu Renaud de Bapaume (Avignon Obedience)
- 1415–1436: Louis de Luxembourg, 1424–1435, Chancellor of France, appointed by Henry VI of England; partisan of the Burgundians
- 1436–1451: Jean Le Jeune
- 1451–1455: David de Bourgogne (also bishop of Utrecht)
- 1456–1485: Henri of Lorraine-Vaudemont (also bishop of Metz)
- 1485–1496: Antoine de Croy
- 1496–1513: Philipp de Luxemburg
- 1513–1521: François de Melun
- 1521–1535: John, Cardinal of Lorraine
- 1535–1537: François de Créquy

== See also ==
- Catholic Church in France
- List of Catholic dioceses in France

== Bibliography ==
=== References ===
- Gams, Pius Bonifatius (1873). Series episcoporum Ecclesiae catholicae: quotquot innotuerunt a beato Petro apostolo. Ratisbon: Typis et Sumptibus Georgii Josephi Manz. pp. 521–522. (Use with caution; obsolete)
- Eubel, Conradus, ed. (1913). Hierarchia catholica, Tomus 1 (second ed.). Münster: Libreria Regensbergiana. (in Latin) pp. 350–351.
- Eubel, Conradus, ed. (1914). Hierarchia catholica, Tomus 2 (second ed.). Münster: Libreria Regensbergiana. (in Latin) p. 196-197.

=== Particular studies ===
- Bled, O. (1894). "Thérouanne–une ville disparue". Bulletin historique et philologique du Comité des travaux historiques et scientifiques (in French). Paris (1895): Impr. nationale. 1894. pp. 191–216.
- Bled, O. (1904). Regestes de évêques de Thérouanne, 500-1553 (in French and Latin). Vol. Tome I. Saint-Omer: D'Homont.
- Bled, O. (1907). Regestes des évêques de Thérouanne, 500-1553: fasc.1. 1415-1558 (in French and Latin). Vol. Tome II, i. Saint-Omer: lith. H. D'Homont.
- Duchet, Th.; Giry, Arthur (1881). Cartulaires de l'église de Térouane (in French and Latin). Saint-Omer: Impr. Fleury-Lemaire.
- Guérard, Benjamin; Morand, François (1840). Cartulaire de l'abbaye de Saint-Bertin (in French and Latin). Vol. 1. Paris: Impr. Royale.
- Laplane, Henri de (1854). Les abbés de Saint Bertin, d'après les anciens monuments de ce monastère (in French). Saint Omer: Chanvin.
- Mériaux, Charles (2002). La formation des diocèses septentrionaux de la Gaule du VIe au Xe siècle (Arras-Cambrai, Tournai et Thérouanne): mission, topographie chrétienne et culte des saints. Thèse de doctorat : Histoire (in French). Lille.
- Nelson, Janet (1991). The Annals of St-Bertin. Manchester University Press. ISBN 978-0-7190-3425-1.
- Sainte-Marthe, Denis de (1751). Gallia Christiana: In Provincias Ecclesiasticas Distributa... De provincia Remensi, ejusque suffraganeis Ambianensi, Silvanectensi & Boloniensi ecclesiis (in Latin). Vol. Tomus decimus (X). Paris: Typographia Regia. pp. 1526–1571.
- Vallet de Viriville, Auguste (1844). Essai sur ls archives historiques du Chapitre de l'église cathédrale de Notre-Dame à St.-Omer (Pas-de-Calais) (in French). Saint Omer: Imp. Chanvin.
- Van Drival, Eugene (1850). Légendaire de la Morinie, ou Vies des Saints de l'ancien Diocèse de Thérouanne (in French). Boulogne: Berger.
