= Bertin =

Frankish abbot (7th century)

Saint Bertin the Great
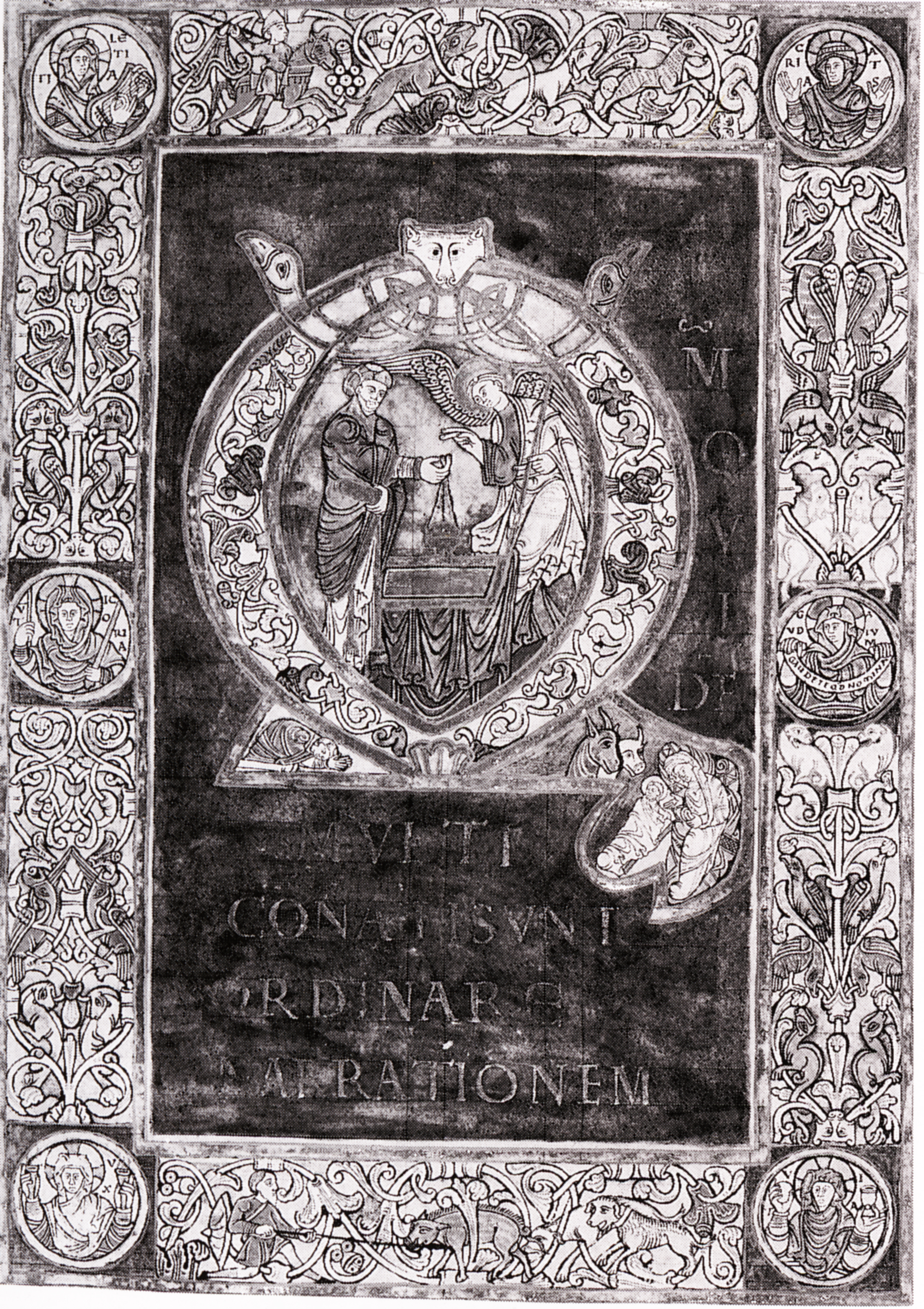
- Illustration of St. Bertin

Missionary
- Born: c. 615; Constance, Duchy of Alamannia, Frankish Kingdom
- Died: c. 709; Abbey of Saint Peter, Saint-Omer, Frankish Kingdom
- Venerated in: Catholic Church; Eastern Orthodox Church
- Major shrine: Abbey of St. Bertin
- Feast: 5 September

Bertin (Latin: Bertinus; c. 615 – c. 709 AD), also known as Saint Bertin the Great, was the Frankish abbot of a monastery in Saint-Omer later named the Abbey of Saint Bertin after him. He is venerated as a saint by the Catholic and Orthodox Churches. The fame of Bertin's learning and sanctity was so great that in a short time more than 150 monks lived under his rule. Among them were St. Winnoc and his three companions who had come from Brittany to join Bertin's community and assist in the conversions. Nearly the whole Morini region was Christianized.

== Life ==
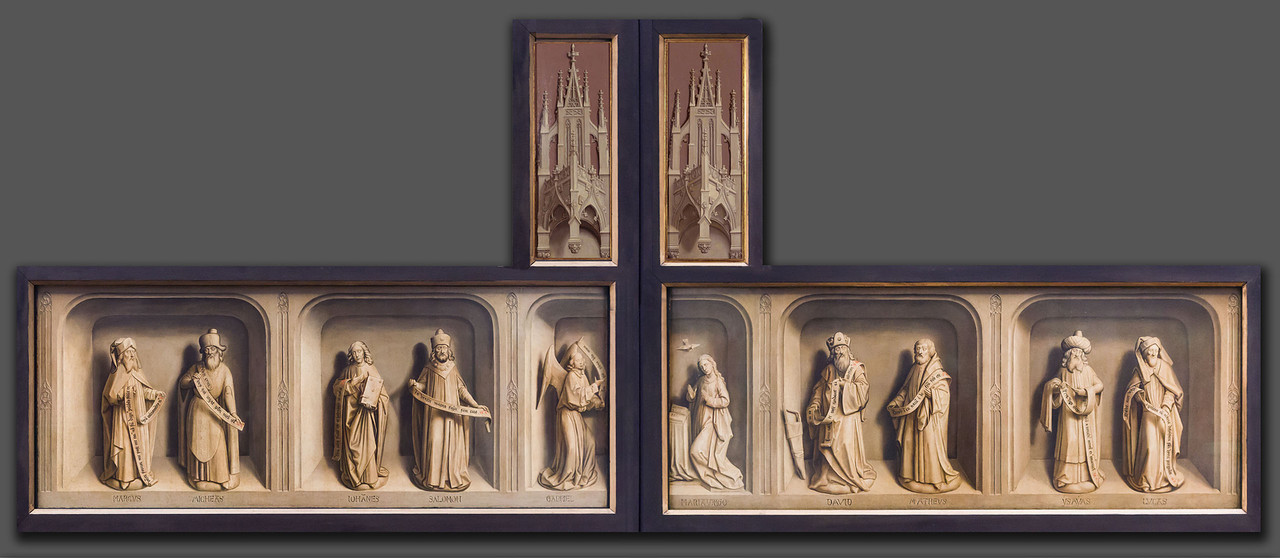
Reconstructed exterior of the St Bertin Altarpiece

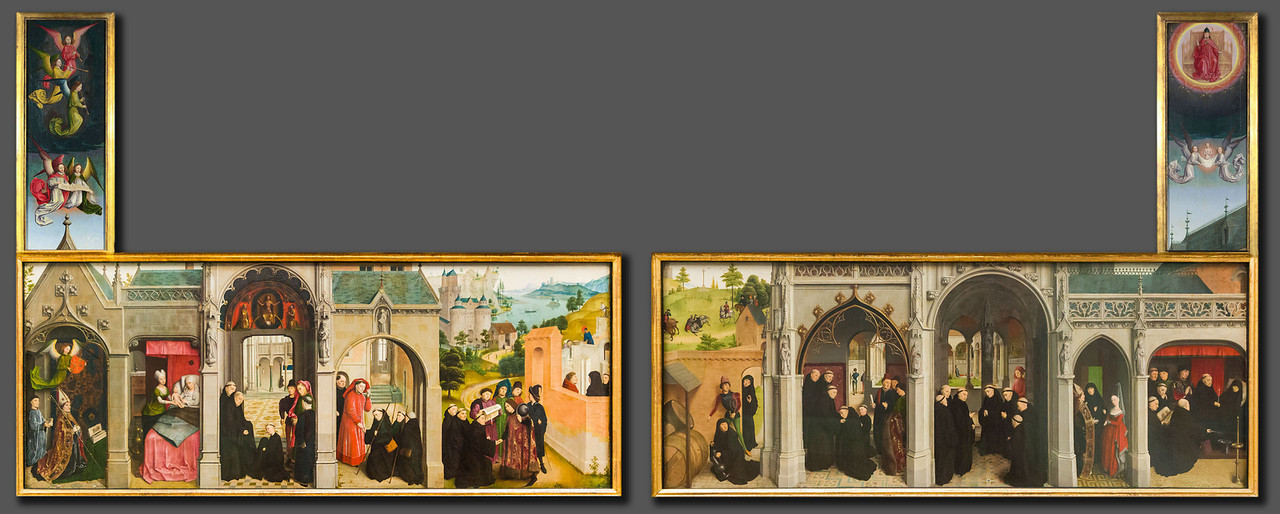
Reconstructed interior of the St Bertin Altarpiece.

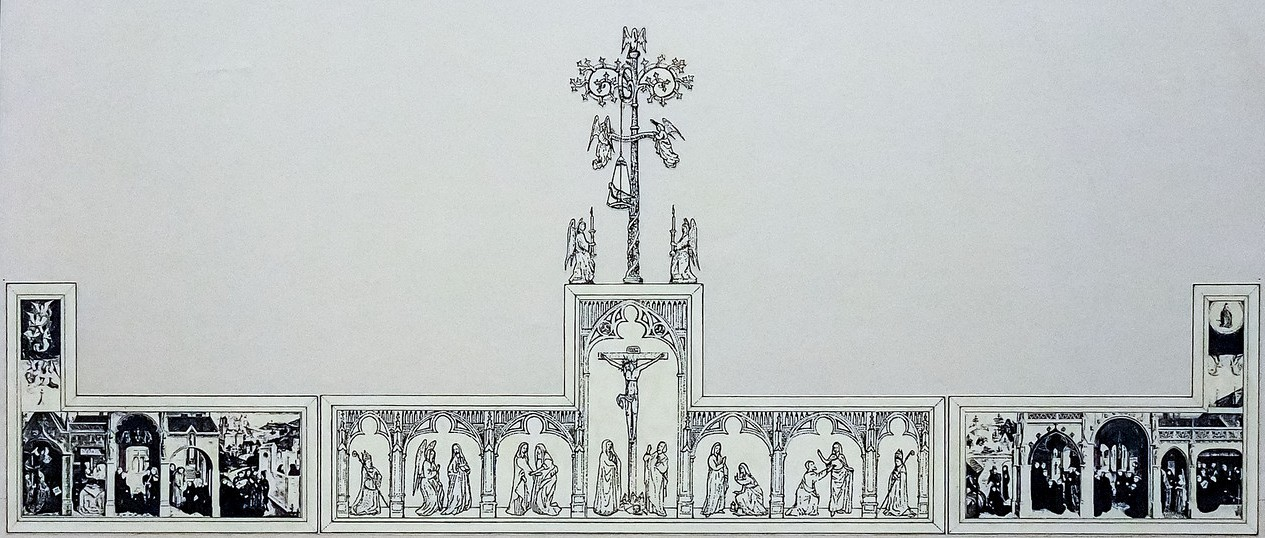
Scheme of reconstructed St Bertin Altarpiece

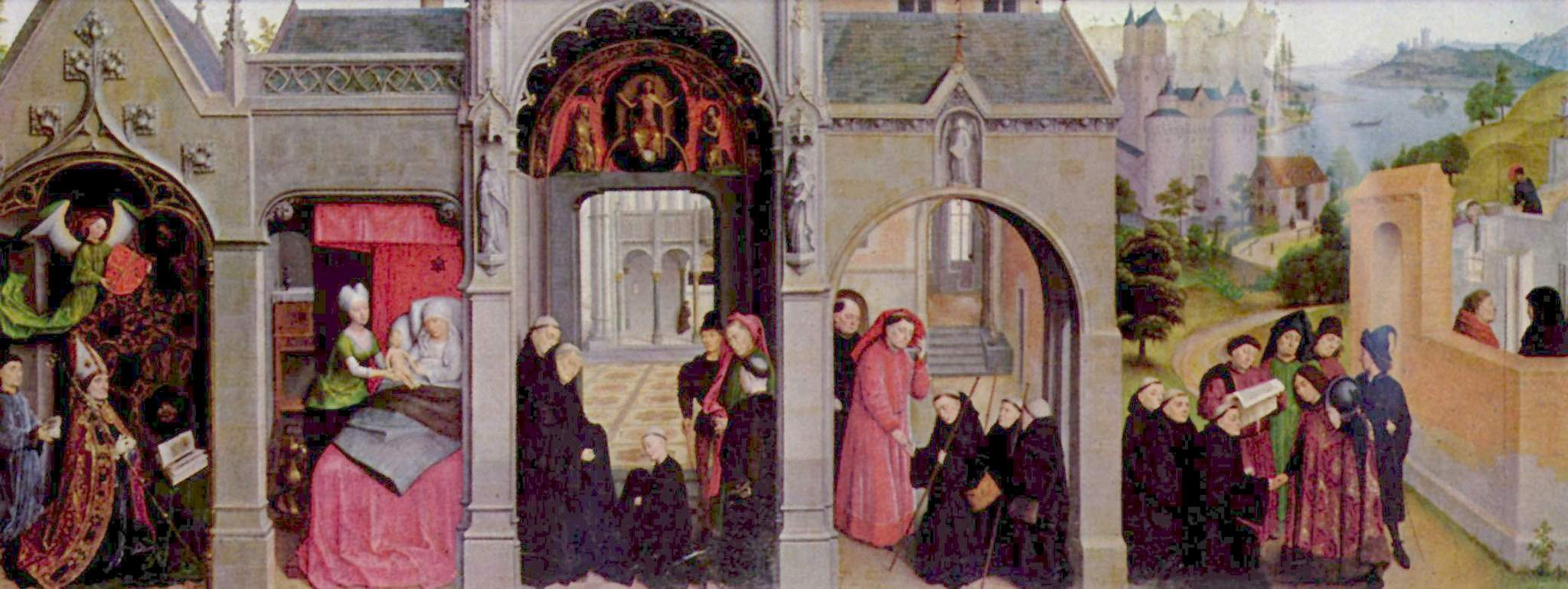
Part of the St Bertin altarpiece, Berlin

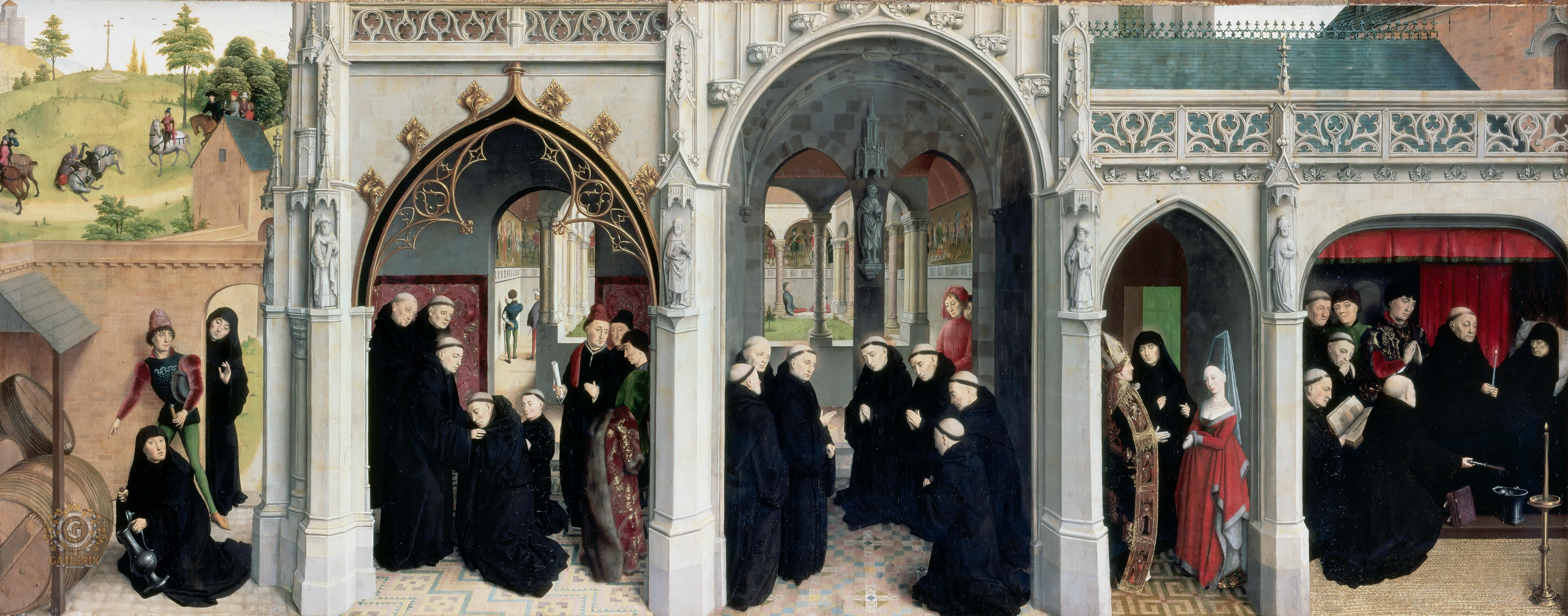
Part of the St Bertin altarpiece, Berlin

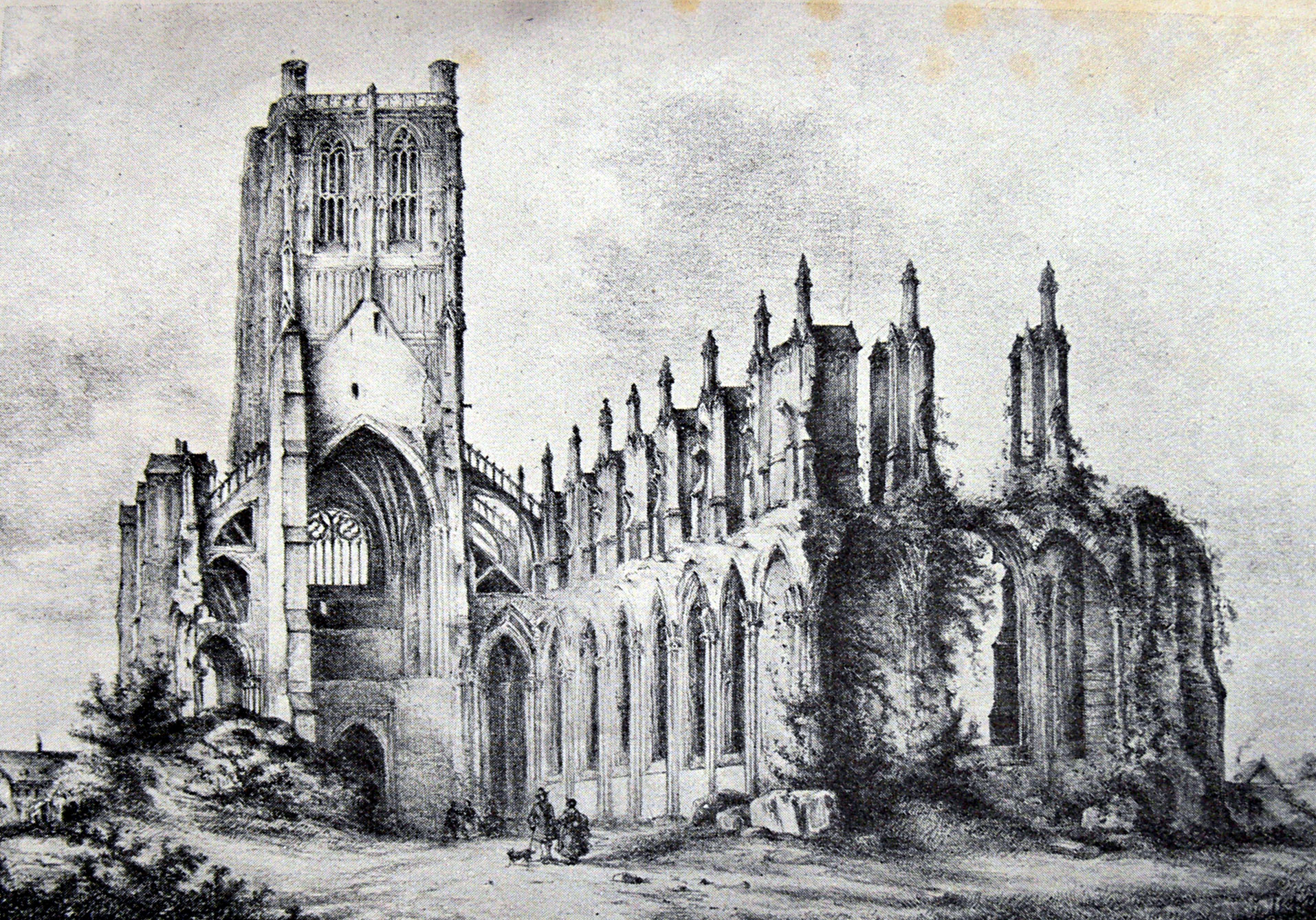
Ruins of the church Saint-Bertin, c. 1850

Bertin was born near Constance, then in the Frankish Duchy of Alamannia. At an early age, he entered the Abbey of Luxeuil, where, under the austere rule of its abbot, Columbanus, he prepared himself for a future missionary career. About the year 638 he set out, in company with two confrères, Mummolin and Ebertram, for the extreme northern part of France in order to assist his friend and kinsman, Bishop Omer, in the evangelization of the Morini. This country, now in the Department of Pas-de-Calais, was then one vast marsh, studded here and there with hillocks and overgrown with seaweed and bulrushes. On one of these hillocks, Bertin and his companions built a small house and they went out daily to preach the Christian faith to the natives, most of whom were still pagans.

Gradually some converted pagans joined the little band of missionaries and a larger monastery had to be built. A tract of land called Sithiu had been donated to Omer by a converted nobleman named Adrowald. Omer now turned this whole tract over to the missionaries, who selected a suitable place on it for their new Abbey of St. Peter. Additional villages were granted by Count Waldebert, later a monk at Bertin's monastery of Sythiu and eventually Abbot of Luxueil and canonized, who gave his son at the baptismal font to Bertin, from whom the boy received his name and his education. The community grew so rapidly that in a short time this monastery also became too small and another was built where the city of St. Omer now stands.

The fame of Bertin's learning and sanctity was so great that in a short time more than 150 monks lived under his rule, among them St. Winnoc and his three companions who had come from Brittany to join Bertin's community and assist in the conversion of the heathen. When nearly the whole region was Christianized, and the marshy land transformed into a fertile plain, Bertin, knowing that his death was not far off, appointed Rigobert as his successor, while he himself spent the remainder of his life preparing for a happy death. Bertin began to be venerated as a saint soon after his death. His feast day is celebrated on 5 September.

Mummolin, perhaps because he was the oldest of the missionaries, was abbot of the two monasteries until he succeeded the deceased Eligius as Bishop of Noyon, about the year 659. Waldebert's son Bertin, adopted by Bertin the founder, then became the third abbot.

In later times the abbey became famous as a centre of sanctity and learning. About the 11th century, the name of the abbey was changed that of Saint-Bertin. The Annales Bertiniani (830–882; Mon. Germ. Hist. Script. I, 419–515) are important for the contemporary history of the West Frankish Kingdom. The abbey church, now in ruins, was one of the finest 14th-century Gothic edifices. In later times, its library, archives, and art-treasures were renowned both in and out of France.

The monks were expelled in 1791 by the invading forces of the French Revolutionary Army and in 1799 the abbey and its church were sold at auction.

His iconography is a boat as his home town, Sithiu was only accessible by water in Bertins time. A feast day is celebrated on 5 September, and his cult was taken to England with the Norman Invasion.

== See also ==
- Saint Bertin, patron saint archive
