= Battle of Cassel (1677) =

1677 battle during the Franco-Dutch War

Coordinates: 50.8006°N 2.4883°E

- Part of the Franco-Dutch War
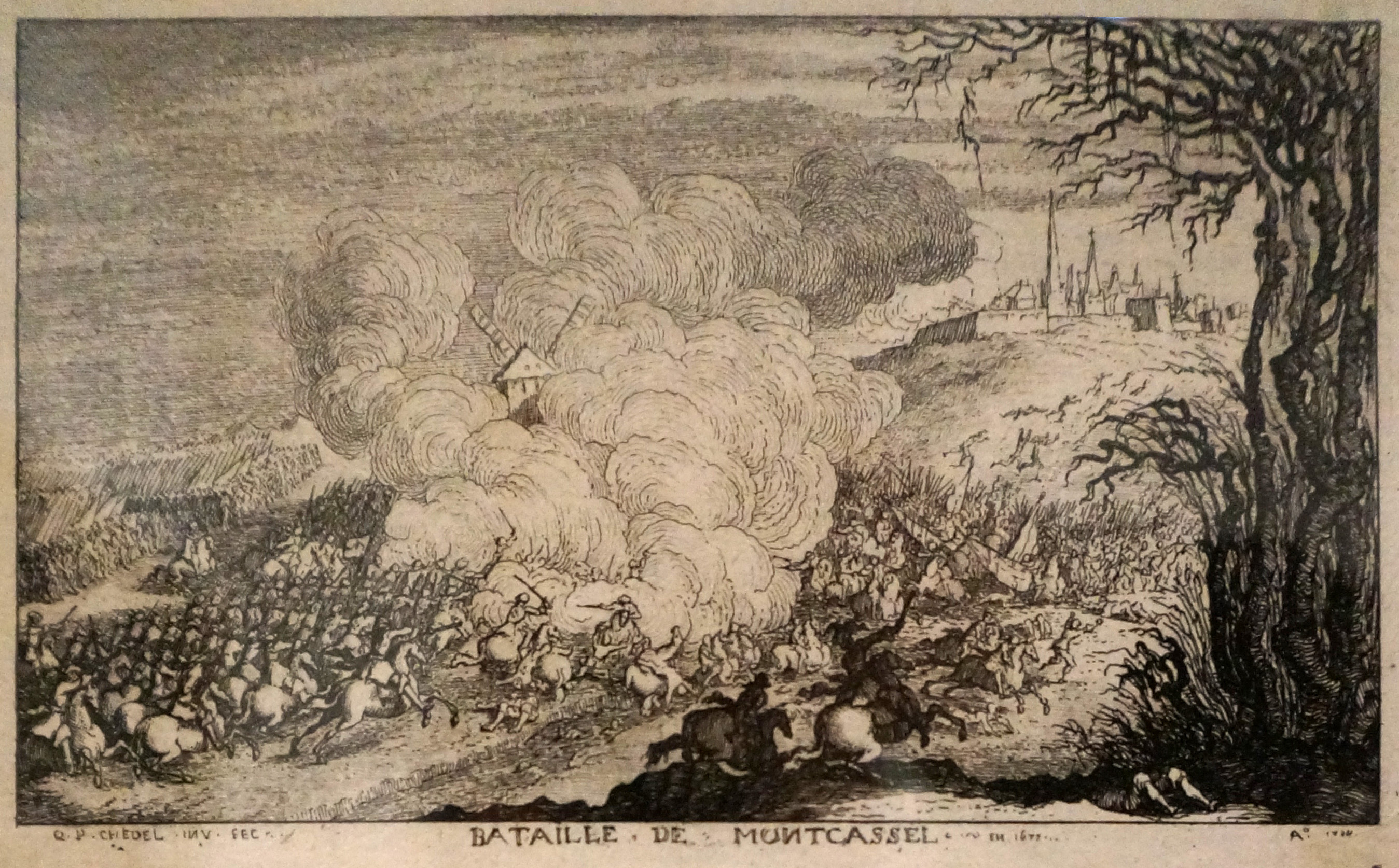
- Battle of Cassel, April 1677
| Date | 11 April 1677 |
| Location | Cassel, France |
| Result | French victory |

Belligerents
| France | Dutch Republic; Spain |

Commanders and leaders
| (Kingdom of France) Duke of Luxembourg (Kingdom of France) Philippe of Orléans (Kingdom of France) Duke of Humières | (Dutch Republic) William of Orange (Dutch Republic) Count Waldeck (Dutch Republic) Prince of Nassau-Usingen |

Strength
| 30,000–35,000 | 30,000–35,000 |

Casualties and losses
| 3,200–4,400 dead or wounded | 7,000–8,000 dead or wounded 2,500–3,000 captured |

The Battle of Cassel, also known as the Battle of Peene, took place on 11 April 1677 during the Franco-Dutch War, near Cassel, 15 km (9 mi) east of Saint-Omer. A French army commanded by the duc de Luxembourg defeated a combined Dutch–Spanish force under William of Orange.

At the start of 1677, peace negotiations opened at Nijmegen; France already held most of the positions in the Spanish Netherlands that Louis XIV of France considered necessary for a defensible border. This would be completed by taking St-Omer and Cambrai, which he wanted to capture as soon as possible, allowing him to negotiate from a position of strength. William marched to relieve St-Omer, and Philippe of Orléans marched out to meet him, leading to the battle outside Cassel.

After initial cavalry attacks by both sides were repulsed, a fierce struggle began between the two sets of infantry. The French infantry on the right drove back the Dutch left, which was then scattered by a French cavalry assault. Meanwhile, an Allied attack launched from their own right was fended off by the French left. In the centre, the Dutch nearly broke through the French lines, before being thrown back by a charge led by Philippe of Orléans. His flanks crumbling, in late afternoon William ordered a retreat.

Although the French missed an opportunity for a rout by delaying their pursuit to plunder the Allies' abandoned baggage, Cassel was one of the most comprehensive victories of the war. Saint-Omer and Cambrai surrendered shortly afterwards, followed by a number of other towns.

== Background ==
Campaigns of 1676–1677 in Northern France and the Spanish Netherlands

In the 1667–1668 War of Devolution, France captured most of the Spanish Netherlands and Franche-Comté, but relinquished much of their gains at the Treaty of Aix-la-Chapelle. This was made possible by the Triple Alliance of the Dutch Republic, England and Sweden; to break this up, King Louis XIV of France paid Sweden to remain neutral, while King Charles II of England agreed to an alliance against the Dutch in the 1670 Treaty of Dover.

When France invaded the Dutch Republic in May 1672 at the start of the Franco-Dutch War, it initially seemed to have won an overwhelming victory. However, the Dutch position stabilised, while concern at French gains brought them support from Frederick William, Elector of Brandenburg, Emperor Leopold and Habsburg Spain. With new fronts opening in the Rhineland and along the Pyrenees, Louis ordered his armies to withdraw from the Netherlands, although they retained the Dutch stronghold of Maastricht.

The anti-French alliance was strengthened when Denmark-Norway joined in January 1674, while the Third Anglo-Dutch War ended with the February Treaty of Westminster. Despite this, France re-captured Franche-Comté and made significant gains in Alsace; after 1675, they focused on consolidating their gains, and establishing defensible borders. An effective Allied response in Flanders was hampered by power struggles in Madrid, while Spanish control over the Spanish Netherlands was by now largely nominal.

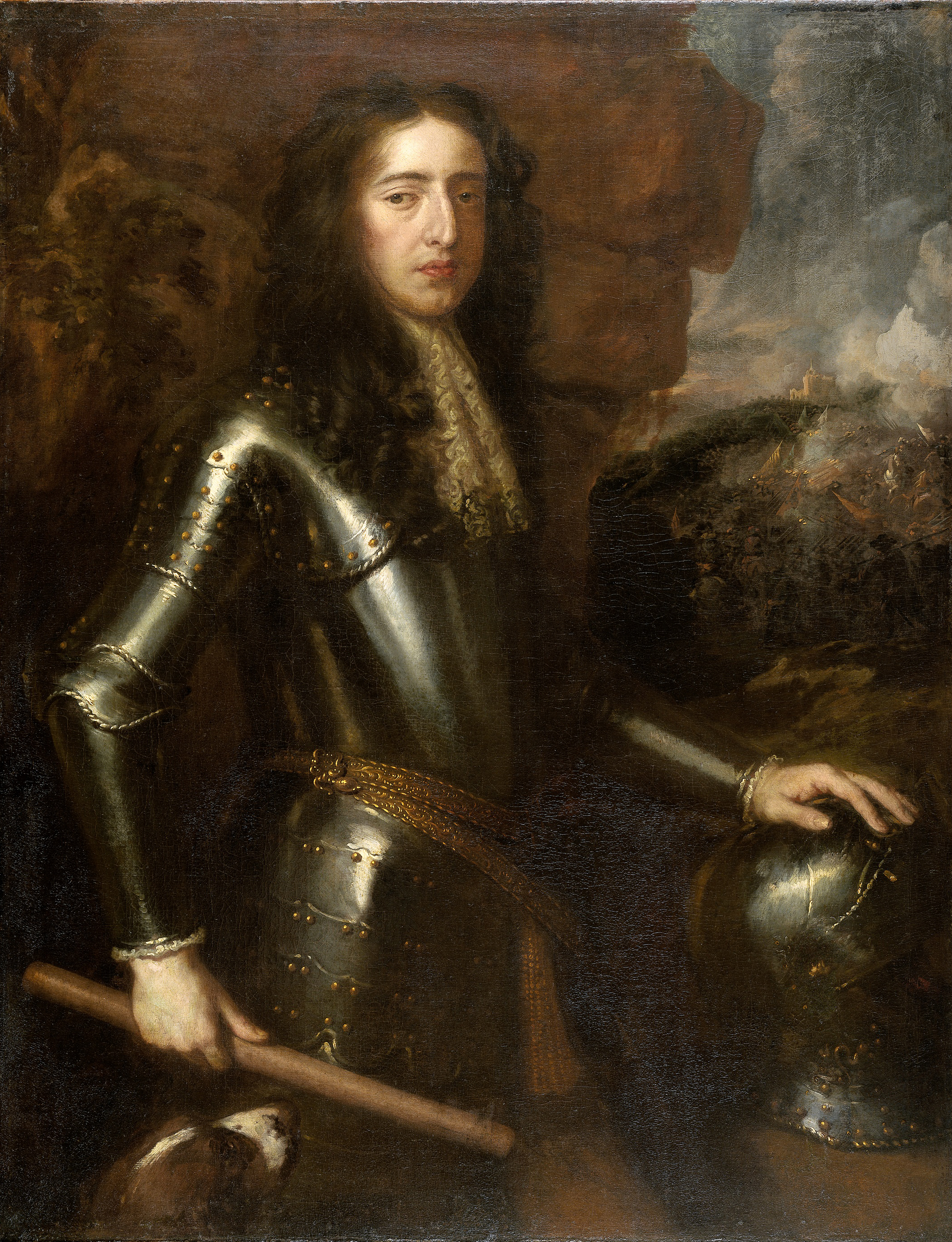
Allied commander William of Orange, c. 1677

Peace talks began at Nijmegen in the summer of 1676 but Louis consistently sought to negotiate from strength by taking the offensive before agreeing terms. To improve their position in Flanders, the French captured Condé-sur-l'Escaut, Bouchain, Maubeuge and Bavay during 1676, and repulsed an attempt to retake Maastricht. The plan for 1677 was to take Valenciennes, Cambrai and Saint-Omer, completing the French frontière de fer or iron border; Louis calculated that this would leave the Dutch little reason to continue fighting.

Throughout the war, superior French logistics allowed them to maintain larger armies and crucially begin operations while their opponents were still in winter quarters. In late February, a month earlier than the usual start of the campaigning season, the main army of 35,000 under Luxembourg besieged Valenciennes. Another 12,000 troops were detached to take Saint-Omer, led by Louis' brother Philippe I, Duke of Orléans and Louis de Crevant, Duke of Humières. After Valenciennes surrendered on 17 March, Luxembourg moved onto Cambrai.

William of Orange assembled 30,000 men, including 4,000 Spanish, at Roosendaal; he could not save Cambrai but was determined to fight for Saint-Omer. Delayed by lack of money and supplies, the Dutch-Spanish force reached Mont-Cassel on 9 April, near the French-held town of Cassel, about 15 km (9 mi) west of Saint-Omer. Leaving small numbers of troops to maintain the sieges of Saint-Omer and Cambrai, the combined French force met at Buysscheure on 10 April. The two sides took up position on either side of the Peene Becque, a stream running through the village of Zuytpeene, which William failed to spot, and had to abandon a surprise attack. This gave French time to receive an additional 38 battalions of infantry and 80 cavalry squadrons from Saint-Omer as reinforcements. As a result, Luxembourg now outnumbered William by over 5,000.

== Battle ==
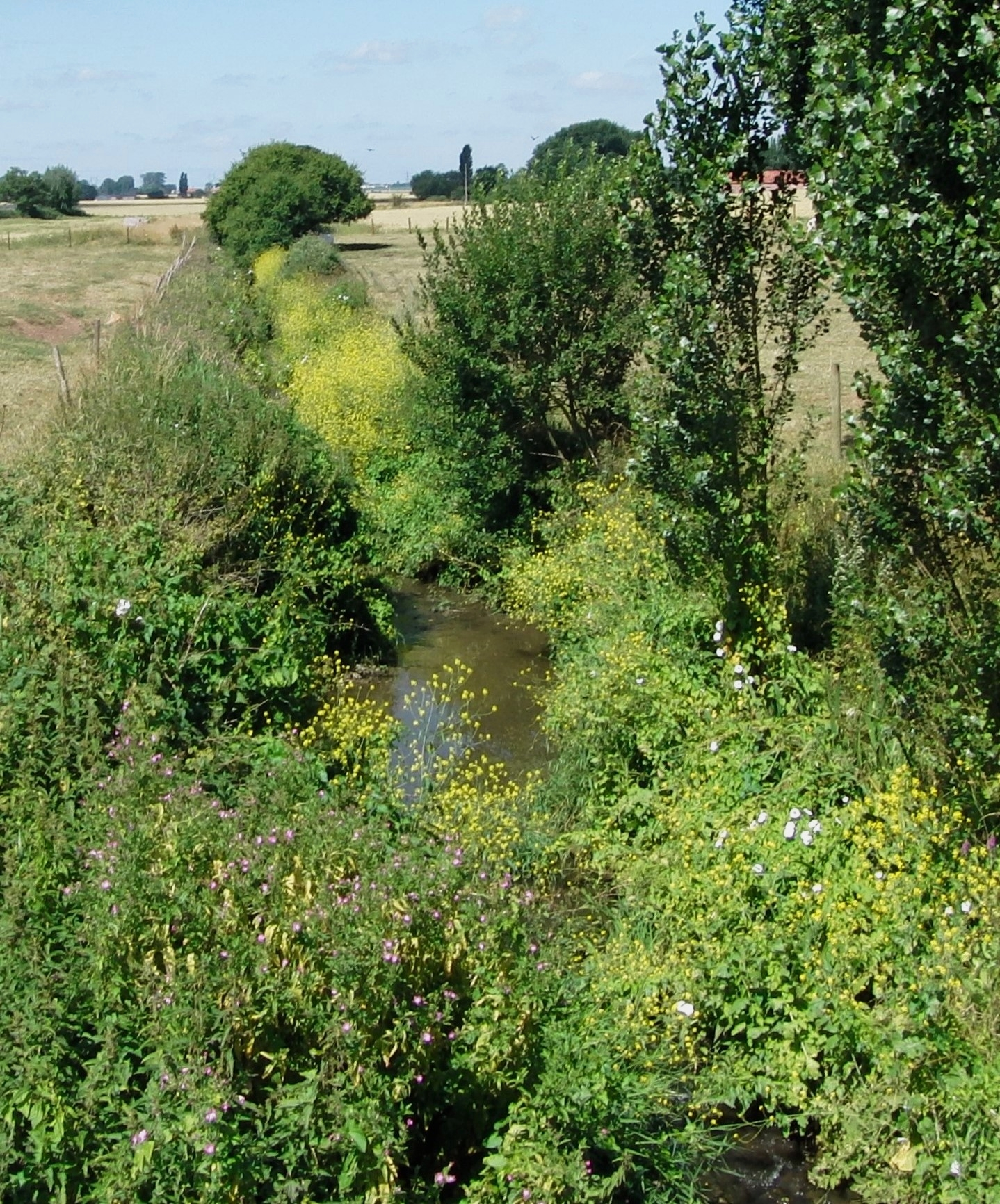
The Peene Becque, a relatively minor obstacle that played a significant part in the battle

Early on 11 April, the Dutch-Spanish army crossed the Peene Becque, but halted when they discovered a second arm of the river between them and the French. Luxembourg and Humières commanded a mixed force of infantry and cavalry on the left and right respectively, with the bulk of the infantry and artillery under Orléans in the centre.

Without waiting for his infantry, Humières attacked as soon as his cavalry was across and was repulsed by entrenched Dutch infantry. A charge led by the Prince of Nassau threw the French back across the river; the Dutch cavalry ran into heavy artillery fire, retreated to the far side of Mont-Cassel, and played no further part in the battle. After reorganising his troops, Orléans ordered a general advance around midday. On the left, Luxembourg attacked the allied right wing, commanded by the Count of Horn, and routed it. On the right, the French infantry engaged the Dutch in a bloody struggle centered on some farm buildings. These were eventually taken, and a subsequent cavalry charge scattered the retreating Dutch infantry.

In the centre, the French were overrun by infantry under Prince Georg Friedrich of Waldeck and the line only re-established after a charge led by Orléans himself. With his flanks giving way, around 16:00 William ordered a general retreat towards Ypres, covered by Nassau's cavalry. Cassel was a resounding French victory; in return for 3,200 to 4,400 dead and wounded, they inflicted around 7,000 to 8,000 casualties. They also took 2,500 to 3,000 prisoners, and captured the Dutch baggage train, but the delay caused by looting meant they failed to fully exploit their victory.

== Aftermath ==
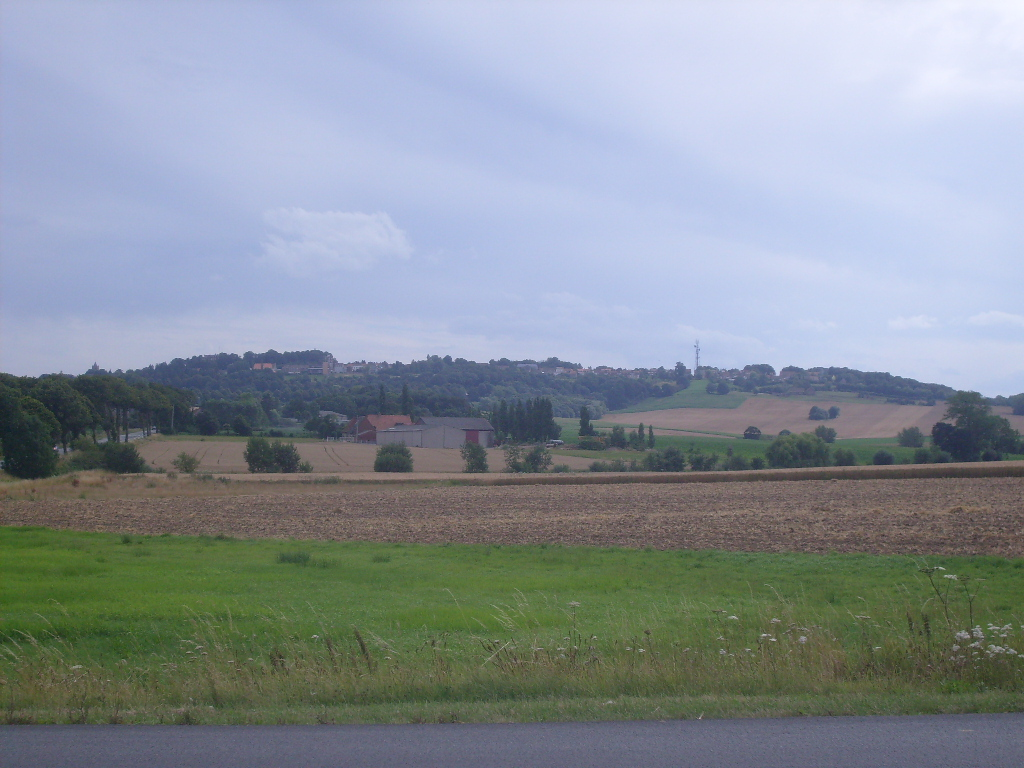
Mont-Cassel, assembly point for the Dutch-Spanish army

Cambrai capitulated on 17 April 1677, followed by Saint-Omer on 20 April, but the goal of forcing the Dutch to accept peace terms remained elusive. French resources were diverted by an Imperial offensive in the Rhineland, while by August, William and the Spanish governor Carlos de Aragón de Gurrea, 9th Duke of Villahermosa had over 60,000 troops available. Luxembourg avoided battle, forcing William to besiege Charleroi instead; this was unsuccessful and the French followed up by taking Saint-Ghislain in December, but it demonstrated the Dutch capacity to fight on.

English public opinion was strongly anti-French and Cassel led to pressure from Parliament to intervene on behalf of the Dutch, forcing Louis to downplay this success. The Dutch were reluctant to continue the war but restoring the Spanish Netherlands as a buffer zone became even more important after the disasters of 1672, while their position was improved by William's marriage in November 1677 to Charles II's niece, Mary Stuart.

Cassel was the first and last time Orléans fought in the front-line, allegedly due to Louis' resentment of the attention and popularity he gained as a result. The 1678 Treaties of Nijmegen reset France's northern border, Spain ceding Saint-Omer, Cassel, Aire, Ypres, Cambrai, Valenciennes and Maubeuge. With the exception of Ypres, returned in 1697, this fixed the frontier close to where it remains today.

== Sources ==
- Barker Nicholls, Nancy (1998). Brother to the Sun King: Philippe, Duke of Orleans. Johns Hopkins Press. ISBN 978-0801861642.
- De Périni, Hardÿ (1896). Batailles françaises, Volume V. Ernest Flammarion, Paris.
- Davenport, Frances (1917). European Treaties bearing on the History of the United States and its Dependencies.
- Lynn, John (1996). The Wars of Louis XIV, 1667–1714 (Modern Wars In Perspective). Longman. ISBN 978-0582056299.
- Nolan, Cathal (2008). Wars of the age of Louis XIV, 1650–1715. ABC-CLIO. ISBN 978-0-313-33046-9.
- Smith, Rhea (1965). Spain; A Modern History. University of Michigan Press. ISBN 978-0472071500.
- Van Nimwegen, Olaf (2010). The Dutch Army and the Military Revolutions, 1588-1688. Boydell Press. ISBN 978-1843835752.
- Young, William (2004). International Politics and Warfare in the Age of Louis XIV and Peter the Great. iUniverse. ISBN 978-0595813988.
- Van Nimwegen, Olaf (2020). De Veertigjarige Oorlog 1672-1712. Prometheus. ISBN 978-90-446-3871-4.
