= Paul Hazard =

French professor and historian of ideas

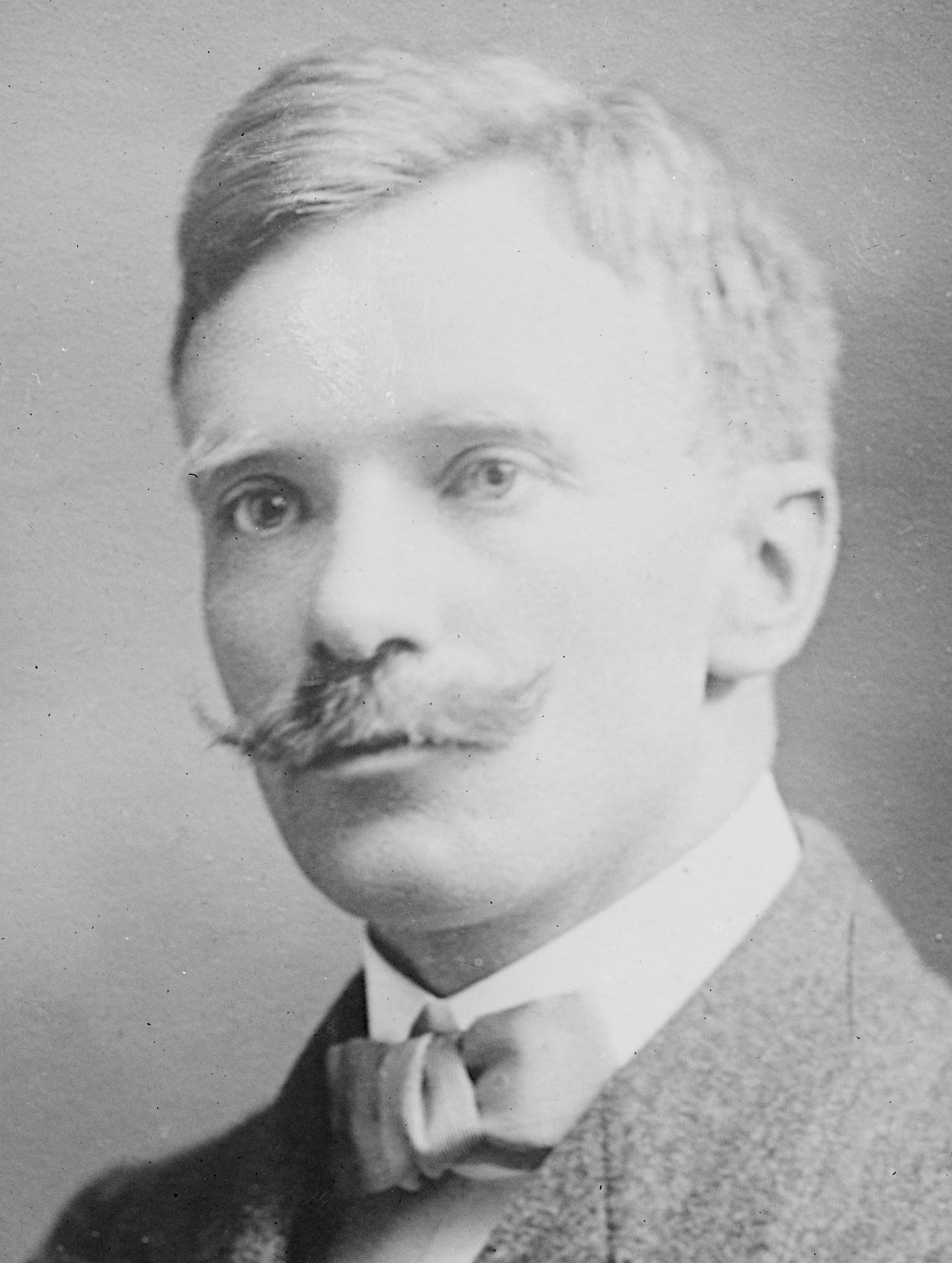
Paul Hazard

Paul Gustave Marie Camille Hazard (French: [azaʁ]; 30 August 1878, in Noordpeene, Nord – 12 April 1944, in Paris), was a French professor and historian of ideas.

== Biography ==
Hazard was the son of a school teacher. Starting in 1900, he attended the École Normale Supérieure in Paris. He received a doctorate from the Sorbonne in 1910 and became famous for his Ph.D. dissertation La Révolution française et les lettres italiennes (1910).

Hazard began his career at the University of Lyon in 1910, teaching comparative literature. In 1919 he began teaching also at the Sorbonne. In 1925 Hazard was appointed to the chair of comparative literature at the Collège de France in Paris. In alternating years, from 1932 until 1940, he was a visiting lecturer at Columbia University in New York. During the 1920s and 1930s, Hazard also lectured at other American schools. He was elected to the Académie française in 1940.

After finishing his semester of teaching at Columbia in 1940, Hazard voluntarily returned to Nazi occupied France in January 1941. He continued to teach, at Lyon and Paris, and to study. Later that same year Hazard was nominated to the rectorship of the University of Paris, but was rejected by the Nazis as unacceptable. Working under what have been described as cruel circumstances, he completed European Thought in the Eighteenth Century. In the year of his death, an article, "Pour que vive l'âme de la France" [So That the Soul of France May Live], appeared in the clandestine review France de demain.

Hazard died in Paris on 12 April 1944.

== Published works ==
Hazard founded, with Fernand Baldensperger, the Revue de littérature comparée in 1921. Some of his important writings are Histoire illustrée de la littérature française (comp. with Joseph Bédier, 2 vol., 1923–24); Leopardi (1913); Lamartine (1926); Stendhal (1927); Don Quichotte (1931); and Les livres, les enfants et les hommes (1932) (Books, Children and Men tr. 1944). This last work has been described as a sensitive appraisal of works written either for very young readers, or taken over by them, covering all Europe over many centuries. In this book, he was the first to point out that Northern Europe surpassed Southern Europe in children's literature.

Hazard is known today mainly for two works. The first was La Crise de la conscience européenne, 1935 (The European Mind, the Critical Years, 1680-1715, tr. 1952). This work examined the conflict between 17th-century Neoclassicism and its ideals of order and perfection and the ideas of the Enlightenment.

The other was his last completed work La Pensée européenne au XVIIIème siècle, de Montesquieu à Lessing (1946) (European Thought in the Eighteenth Century from Montesquieu to Lessing, tr. 1954 by J. Lewis May) published posthumously in 1946. This work was a continuation of the subject matter discussed in The European Mind. Apparently, Hazard intended a third volume which would have focused on "the Man of Feeling. On that enterprise we have already embarked. One day, perchance, we shall complete it. One day, si vis suppeditat, as the Romans used to say." (European Thought in the Eighteenth Century, p. xx) Hazard did not live to complete it.

== Sources ==
- Ricuperati, Giuseppe (1974). "Paul Hazard e la Storiografia dell'Illuminismo [Paul Hazard and Enlightenment historiography]". Rivista Storica Italiana. 86 (2): 372–404.
- Columbia Electronic Encyclopedia entry at Answers.com
- From Encyclopædia Britannica
