= Cassel, Nord =

Cassel Kassel
- Commune
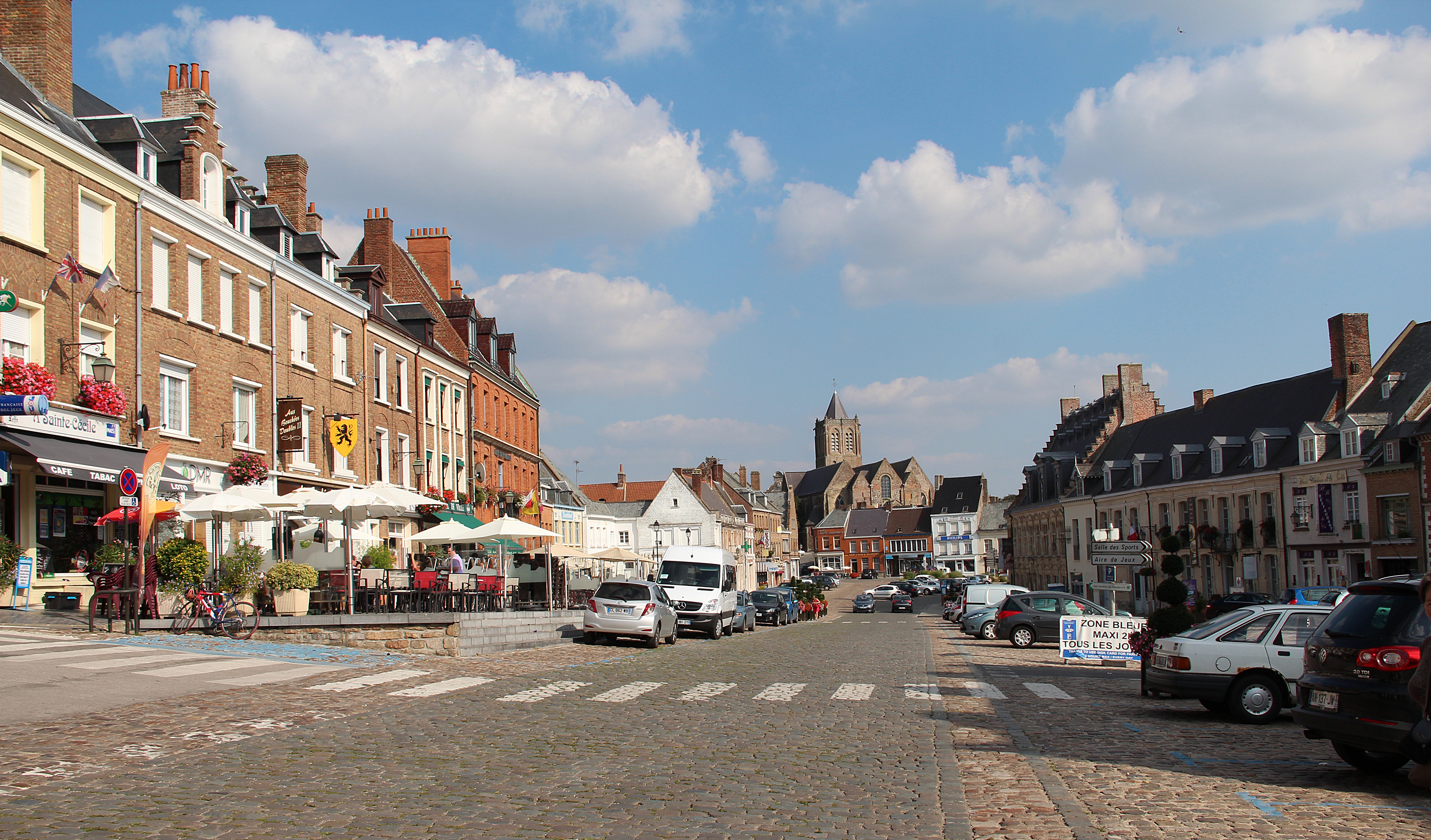
- Grande Place, Cassel

- Coat of arms
- Location of Cassel
- Location within France Location within Hauts-de-France
- Coordinates: 50°48′02″N 2°29′18″E
- Country: France
- Region: Hauts-de-France
- Department: Nord
- Arrondissement: Dunkerque
- Canton: Bailleul
- Intercommunality: CA Cœur de Flandre

Government
  - Mayor (2020–2026): Dominique Joly
- Area^{1}: 12.65 km^{2} (4.88 sq mi)
- Elevation: 90 m (300 ft)
- Highest elevation: 176 m (577 ft)
- Population (2023): 2,198
  - Density: 173.8/km^{2} (450.0/sq mi)
- Time zone: UTC+01:00 (CET)
  - Summer (DST): UTC+02:00 (CEST)
- INSEE/Postal code: 59135 /59670
- ^{1} French Land Register data, which excludes lakes, ponds, glaciers > 1 km^{2} (0.386 sq mi or 247 acres) and river estuaries.

Cassel (French pronunciation: [kasɛl]; Dutch: Kassel) is a commune in the Nord department in northern France. Built on a prominent hill overlooking French Flanders, the town has existed since Roman times. It was developed by the Romans into an important urban centre and was the focus of a network of roads, which are still in use today, that converge on the hill. After the fall of the Roman Empire, Cassel became an important fortified stronghold for the rulers of Flanders which was repeatedly fought over before finally being annexed to France in the 17th century. It was the headquarters of Marshal Ferdinand Foch during part of the First World War. In 1940, during the German invasion of France, Cassel was the scene of a fierce three-day battle between British forces (led in part by Major Ronald Cartland, MP) and German forces which resulted in much of the town being destroyed.

The town, which was rebuilt following the war, is a popular destination for visitors to French Flanders. It is renowned for its extensive views from the summit of Mont Cassel and is the location of the Nord department's principal museum of local art, history and folklore. It is also the home of the legendary giants Reuze-Papa and Reuze-Maman, which are paraded in effigy each Easter during the town's annual carnival.

== Geography ==
The town of Cassel is situated at the top of Mont Cassel (Dutch: Kasselberg), a prominent hill located in the local Houtland region about 30 kilometres (19 mi) from the sea. The hill rises to a height of 176 metres (577 ft) above sea level. Its geological composition comprises limestone capped with a very hard ferruginous layer of rock.

== History ==
=== Ancient times ===
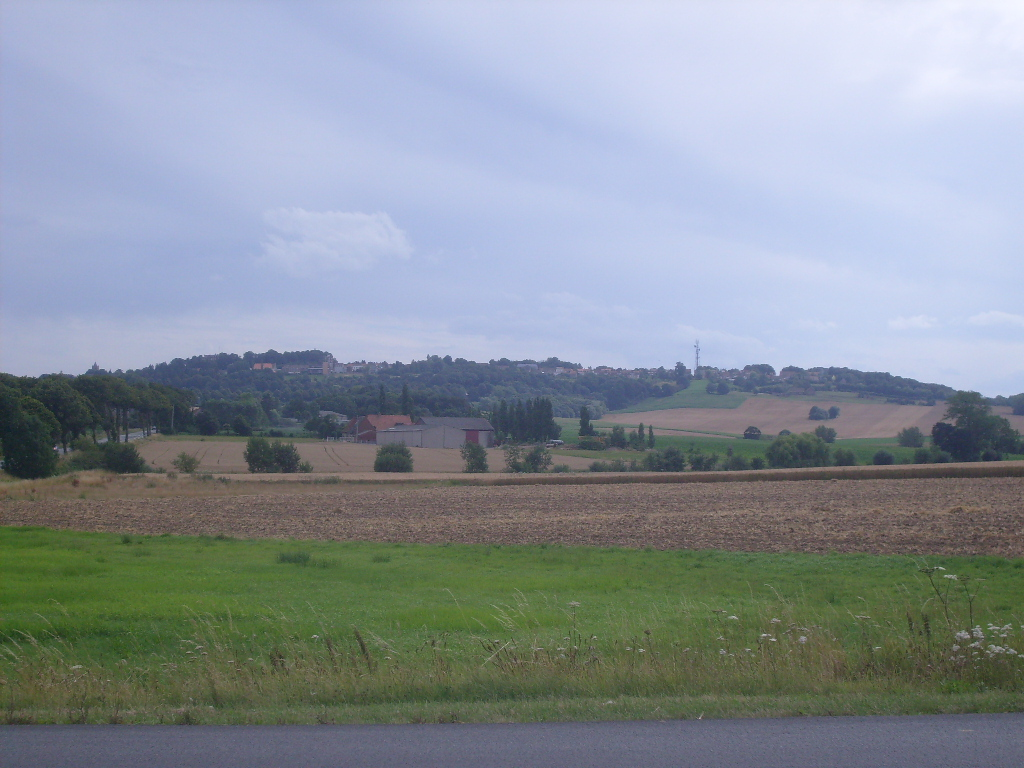
Mont Cassel

The hill of Mont Cassel was occupied during the late Iron Age by the Menapii, a Belgic tribe, who made it the capital of a large territory extending from modern Calais to as far as the Rhine. The hilltop was probably used as an oppidum or hill fort. The Menapii fought against Julius Caesar but were forced to submit to Rome in 53 BC. They rebelled along with their neighbours, the Morini, in 30 or 29 BC. The Roman governor of Gaul, Carrinas, successfully quelled the rebellion and the territory of the Menapii was subsequently absorbed into the Roman province of Gallia Belgica. Cassel was redeveloped as Castellum Menapiorum, the urban centre or civitas of the Menapii; the modern town takes its name from the Roman settlement.

From the 1st century AD onwards, Cassel developed into a key urban centre for the whole region with an extensive road network converging on the hill. Towards the end of the 3rd century, however, repeated invasions of Germanic tribes caused devastation throughout the region and at least 80% of settlements in the area are thought to have been abandoned, accompanied by a general economic decline. Cassel was fortified with a circuit of walls at around this time but suffered its own decline, which was reflected in its loss of status as a regional capital; Tournai took over as the capital of the newly constituted Civitas Turnacensium.

=== Medieval period ===
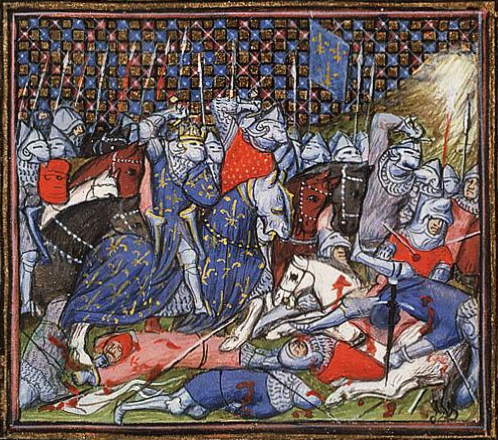
The battle between the Flemish and the French at Cassel by the Virgil Master, c. 1410

Following the collapse of the Roman Empire, Flanders became part of the Merovingian realm of Neustria. In the 9th century it became part of West Francia, forming a pagus within the kingdom of Charles the Bald. In 864, Cassel passed into the hands of Baldwin Ironarm, who expanded his holdings to become the first count of the County of Flanders. At the time, the town was on the edge of a deep bay of the North Sea, making it vulnerable to raids by the Vikings, who attacked and destroyed it in the 9th century. It was rebuilt by Baldwin's grandson, Arnulf I, in the 10th century.

In 1071, the sixth Count of Flanders, Arnulf III, was killed in the first Battle of Cassel by the forces of Robert the Frisian in a dispute over the succession to the title of count. Although Arnulf was numerically superior and was supported by King Philip I of France, Robert was able to defeat his rival's army and took the title of Count of Flanders with the acquiescence of Philip I after a further five years of struggle. The town was re-fortified, possibly by Robert, with a castle and a new set of walls built on the remains of the old Roman walls. The castle does not survive today—it was already in ruins by the early 18th century—but is depicted on old engravings as a large square tower, the Tour Grise, dominating the western flank of the hill.

Cassel was the capital of a chatellany (an administrative district) during the Middle Ages, serving as the administrative centre for an area comprising about fifty towns and villages. It was the site of a second battle that took place on 23 August 1328 involving Philip VI of France and a rebel force led by Nicolaas Zannekin. The rebels had driven the ruling Count Louis I out of Flanders and sought to press their advantage by occupying Cassel and attacking the French royal army nearby. Although they achieved some initial successes, the rebels were decisively defeated when William I, Count of Hainaut lent his support to the French side.

=== Early modern period ===
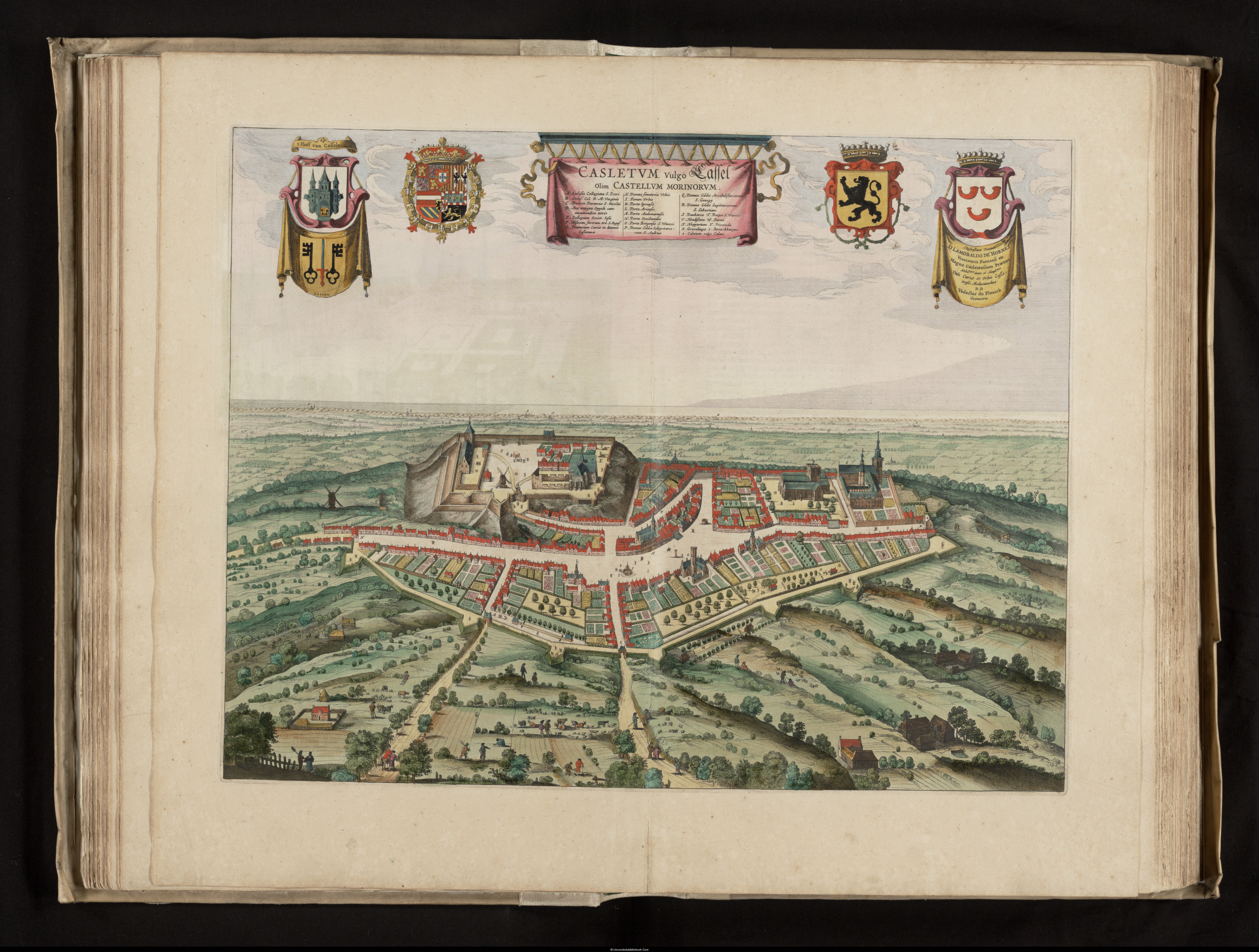
Cassel in the first half of the 17th century (image from Flandria Illustrata – 1641)

By end of the 16th century Cassel had become a border town between France and the Spanish Netherlands. The French repeatedly fought with Spain and later the independent Dutch Republic for control of the town; in March 1645, Gaston, Duke of Orléans, seized it but lost it again to the Spanish a few months later. In 1658 Turenne expelled two Irish regiments in the pay of the Spanish who were garrisoning Cassel. The French captured the town in July 1676 under Louis de Crevant, Duke of Humières and strengthened the castle. The following year, a third battle of Cassel took place just west of the town on 11 April 1677 when a French army under François-Henri de Montmorency, duc de Luxembourg and Philippe I of Orléans defeated Dutch forces commanded by the Prince of Orange, later to be William III of England. The battle took place after King Louis XIV besieged the Dutch-held town of Saint-Omer during the Franco-Dutch War. William sent an army to relieve Saint-Omer but was defeated at the village of Zuytpeene just to the west of Cassel, losing 7,000–8,000 men killed or wounded and another 4,000 taken prisoner. Saint-Omer fell a week later.

Cassel was annexed to France the following year under the terms of the Treaty of Nijmegen, which ended the war. The annexation led to the town's defences being dismantled; it was considered indefensible, as it was within easy firing range of the nearby Mont des Récollets, and it would have cost far too much to fortify both hills. In addition, the revised frontier following the treaty was now a significant distance from Cassel and without the proximity of the border, the town was no longer seen as having much strategic significance.

During the French Revolutionary Wars, Cassel is said to have been the hill up which the Grand Old Duke of York marched his 10,000 men before he "marched them down again". While it is true that Prince Frederick, Duke of York and Albany, did command an army in the Flanders Campaign of 1793 and was probably in the vicinity, the link with Cassel is considered dubious as the eponymous nursery rhyme appears to have originated well before the Revolutionary Wars.

=== 19th century ===
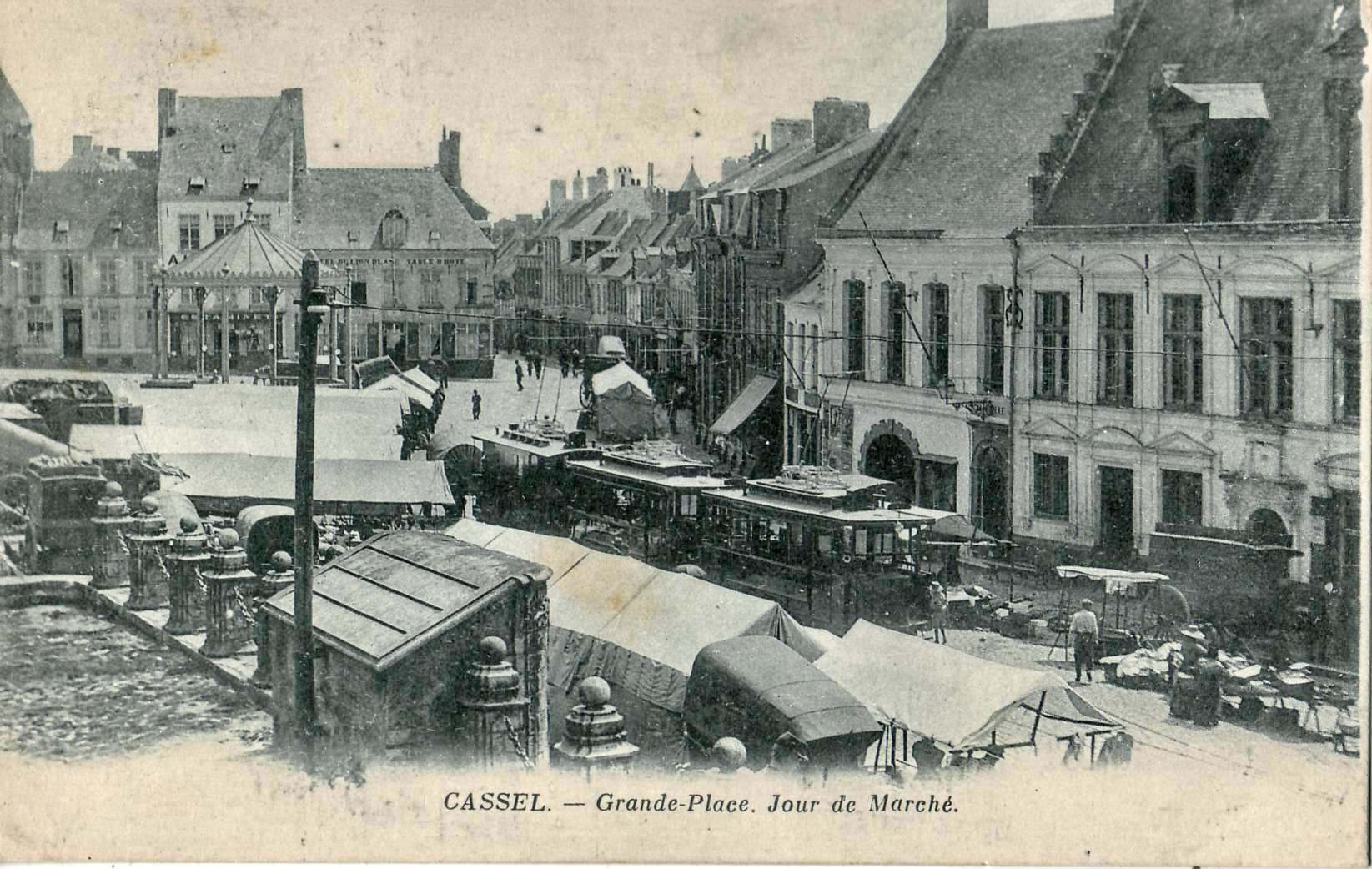
Market day in Cassel, with the electric tramway built in 1900

The population of Cassel grew to about 4,200 people by the mid-19th century. Benjamin Disraeli, later to become Prime Minister of the United Kingdom, stayed there for a month in September–October 1845 and wrote in a letter to his sister Sarah that he considered it "an extremely savage place; few of the inhabitants, & none of the humbler classes, talk French, there is no library, bookseller's shop, nor newspaper of any sort ... It is quite French Flanders, their provisions come from Holland, the Hotel de Ville was built by the Spaniards, the carillons are perpetually sounding, & religion is supreme."

In 1848, Cassel gained a railway connection when the Lille-Dunkirk line was built. The station is, however, at the foot of the hill at Oxelaëre some 3 kilometres (1.9 mi) from the centre of Cassel. To link the two places, an electric tramway was built under the auspices of the Compagnie des Tramways de Cassel, which operated between 1900 and 1934. It was replaced by a bus link which still operates today.

=== 20th century ===
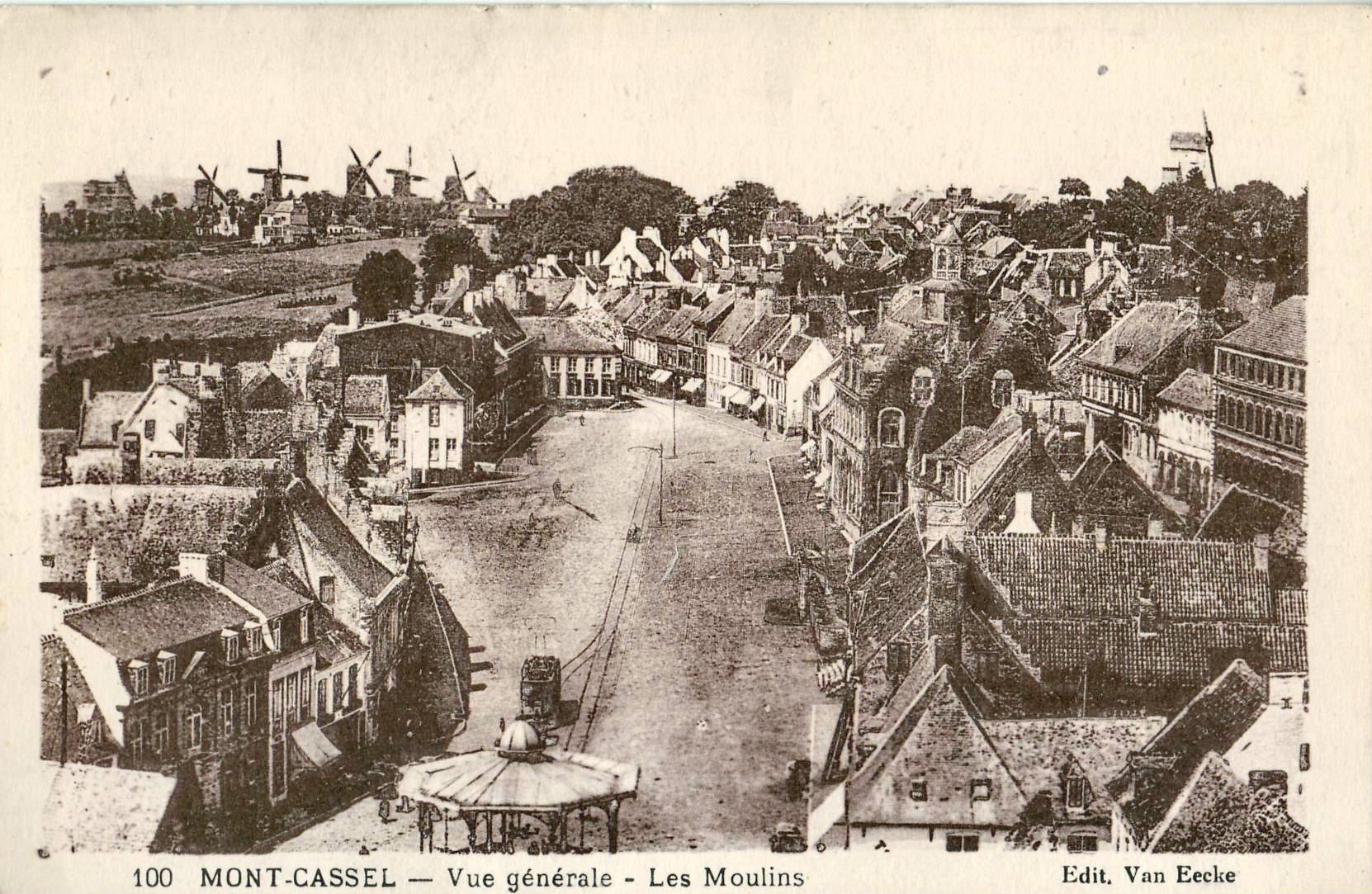
View of the Grand'Place and windmills on Mont Cassel in 1914

Cassel served as the headquarters of Marshal Ferdinand Foch during the early part of the First World War, between October 1914 and May 1915. Foch had previously been based at Doullens north of Amiens, but removed his headquarters to Cassel to take advantage of its strategic position near the northern end of the Western Front and to be closer to the Belgian headquarters at Veurne. From 1916 to 1918, Cassel was the headquarters for the British Second Army under Sir Herbert Plumer. The town avoided significant damage during the war, though it came under occasional shellfire when the Germans advanced to within 18 kilometres (11 mi) during the Battle of the Lys in April 1918.

In the Second World War, the 2nd Battalion, Gloucestershire Regiment and the 4th Oxfordshire and Buckinghamshire Light Infantry held Cassel for three days (27 May 1940 – 30 May 1940) as part of the defensive screen around Dunkirk during the Battle of Dunkirk and evacuation (from 26 May to 4 June). The British forces had prepared a defence on the hilltop, emplacing anti-tank guns and barricading the narrow streets of the town. After scoring initial successes against the tanks of Panzer Regiment 11, which had made the mistake of advancing without infantry support, the British garrison was heavily attacked from the ground and the air by German forces. Much of the town was reduced to ruins by bombing. Most of the garrison's members were killed or captured by the Germans during the fighting or the subsequent attempted breakout towards Dunkirk, but the defence they had put up played an important role in holding up the Germans while the Dunkirk evacuation was taking place.

=== Heraldry ===
Arms of Cassel	The arms of Cassel are blazoned: Azure, a sword between two keys addorsed Or

== Population ==
Historical population
Year	Pop.	±% p.a.
1968	2,621	—
1975	2,340	−1.61%
1982	2,223	−0.73%
1990	2,177	−0.26%
1999	2,290	+0.56%
2007	2,326	+0.20%
2012	2,287	−0.34%
2017	2,289	+0.02%
2023	2,198	−0.67%
Source: INSEE

== Sights and culture ==
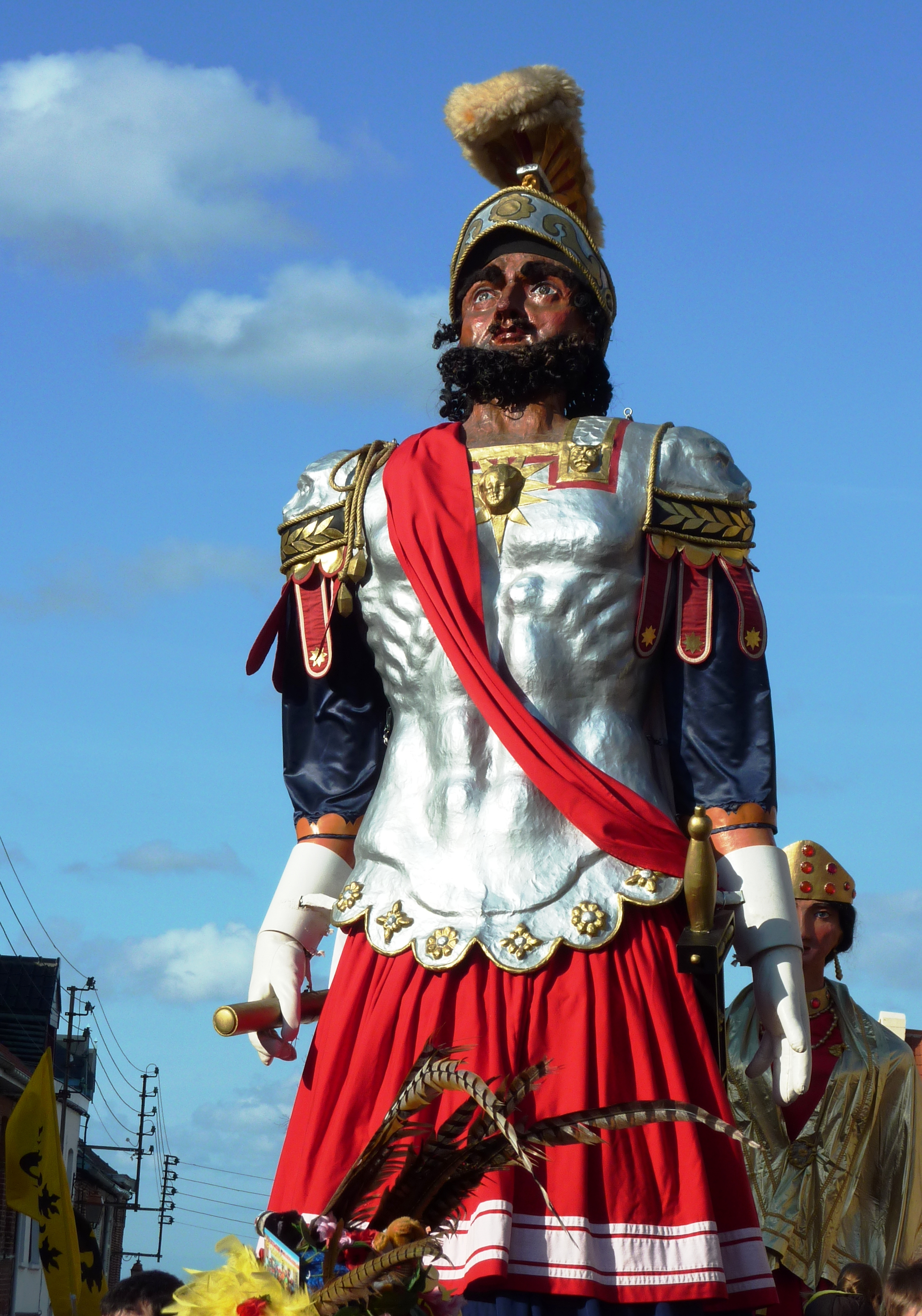
Reuze-Papa, one of the giants of Cassel

The Jardin des Mont du Récollets provides expansive views over the plains of Flanders and beyond; on a clear day it is possible to see the North Sea, the English coast and the belfry of Bruges. It used to be said that from Cassel one could see five kingdoms: France, Belgium, Holland, England and Heaven. The garden also hosts an equestrian statue of Marshal Foch and the Monument des Trois Batailles, commemorating the battles of 1071, 1328 and 1677. Just below the gardens is the Porte du Château of 1621, the last substantial part of the old castle to remain standing. The city walls no longer stand but footpaths and streets still trace their former course.

The Kasteel Meulen ("Castle Windmill") is a post mill situated on the highest point of Mont Cassel on the site of the former castle. A windmill constructed here in the 16th century burned down on 30 October 1911. It was replaced in 1947 by an 18th-century windmill that was moved from nearby Arnèke, one of around twenty that once existed in the area. The mill is open to the public and still operates daily during the high season.

The Hôtel de la Noble Cour (also known as the Landshuys) off Cassel's Grande Place houses the Musée de Flandre, which opened in 2010. The museum presents the art, history and folklore of the French Flanders region. Built in the 16th century under Spanish rule, the mansion's stone-built façade (unusual for Flanders) is decorated in a French Renaissance style and has unusual carvings of grotesque heads, mythical beasts and other figures. The building originally housed the "Noble Court" of the Lords of Cassel, who had authority over a swathe of territory from Ypres in modern Belgium to Saint-Omer.

The Collégiale Notre-Dame de la Crypte is Cassel's main church, built in brick. Parts date from the 11th century but the main part is a 16th-century Gothic structure of a design known as a hallekerk or hall-church, peculiar to Flanders and Artois. It comprises a huge rectangular space with three gables, three aisles, three apses and a square tower over the transept. During his stay in Cassel during the First World War, Marshal Foch regularly prayed here.

=== Events ===
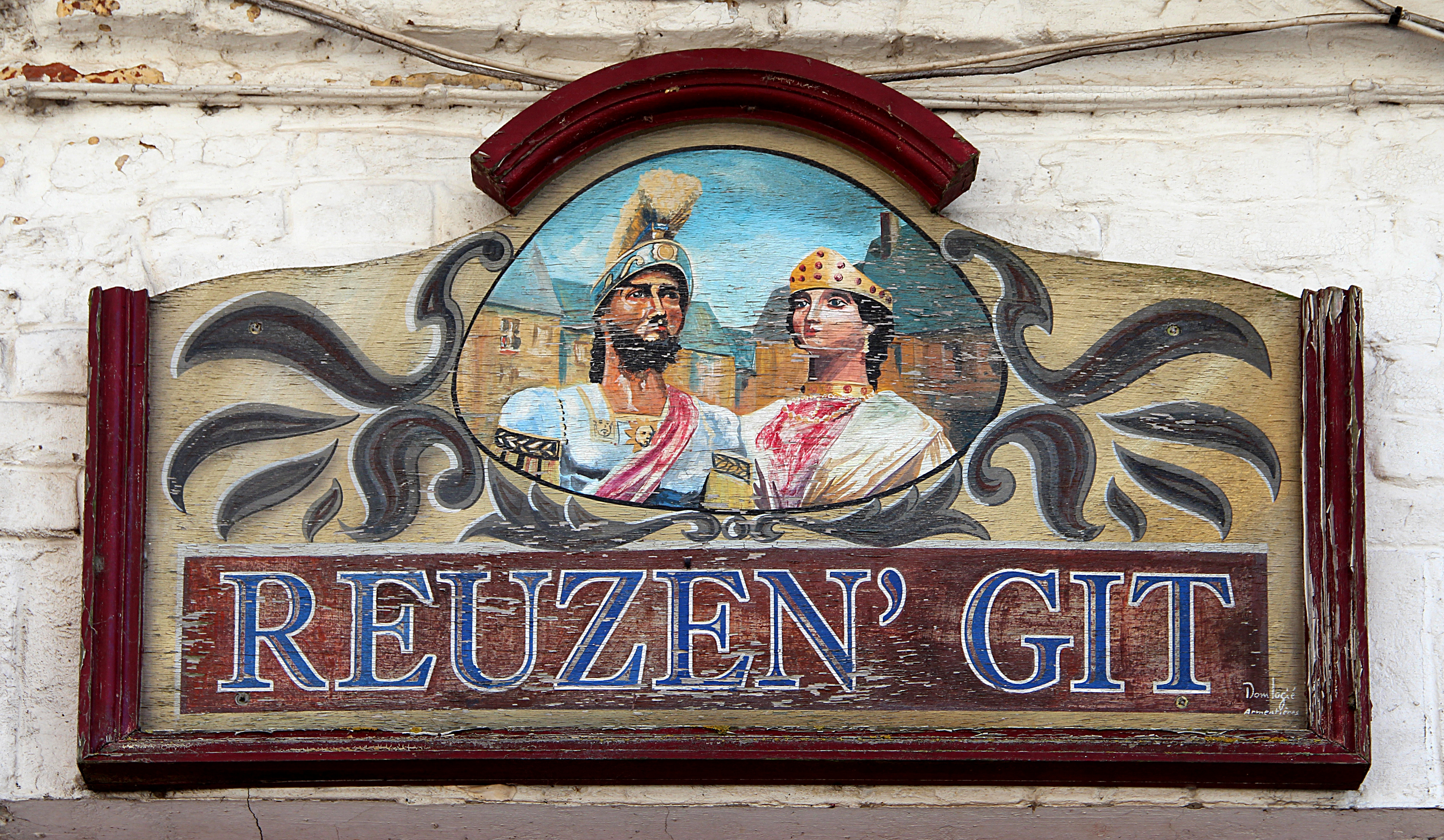
Reuze-Papa en Reuze-Maman the giants of Cassel

Like several other Flemish towns, Cassel commemorates legendary giants in annual processions. The town's two giants are Reuze-Papa (Father Giant, also known as Le Reuze) and Reuze-Maman (Mother Giant, also known as La Reuzaine). They are 94 kilograms (207 lb) and 82 kilograms (181 lb) in weight and 6.25 metres (20.5 ft) and 5.8 metres (19 ft) high, respectively. The current effigies date from 1827 and 1860 respectively, though the tradition dates from the 16th century (when Reuze-Papa was known as Titenka). Reuze-Papa is depicted as a bearded man wearing a Roman-style breastplate and helm, while Reuze-Maman used to be depicted as a shrimp fisher carrying a basket on her back but is now shown wearing a diadem, a red robe and a golden shawl. The couple had their first child, Kint'je, in 1900, followed by Pietje, Boutje and a baby daughter, Meisje. They are escorted by six bodyguards named Allowyn, Dagobert, Gélon, Goliath, Roland and Samson, who all wear Roman dress. The giants commemorate a tradition that the hill of Cassel was created when a couple of giants were carrying a huge mound of earth but tripped, spilling the earth on the ground and forming the hill. The figures make their appearances each year around Easter, when they are paraded around Cassel during the annual carnival. For the rest of the year they are looked after by the association of the amis du Reuze. They are registered as UNESCO "intangible cultural heritage" treasures.

== Gallery ==
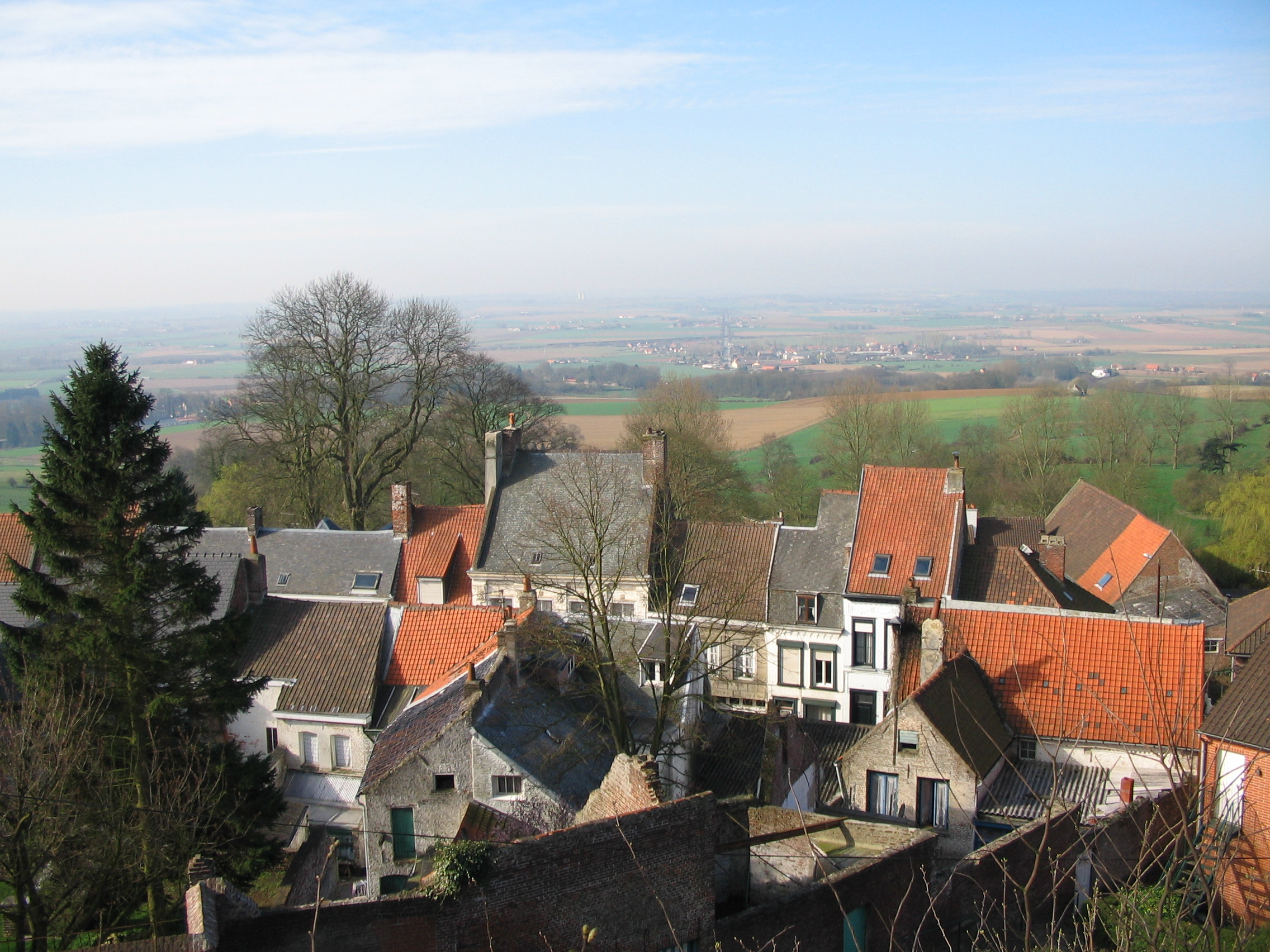
Panoramic view from Cassel

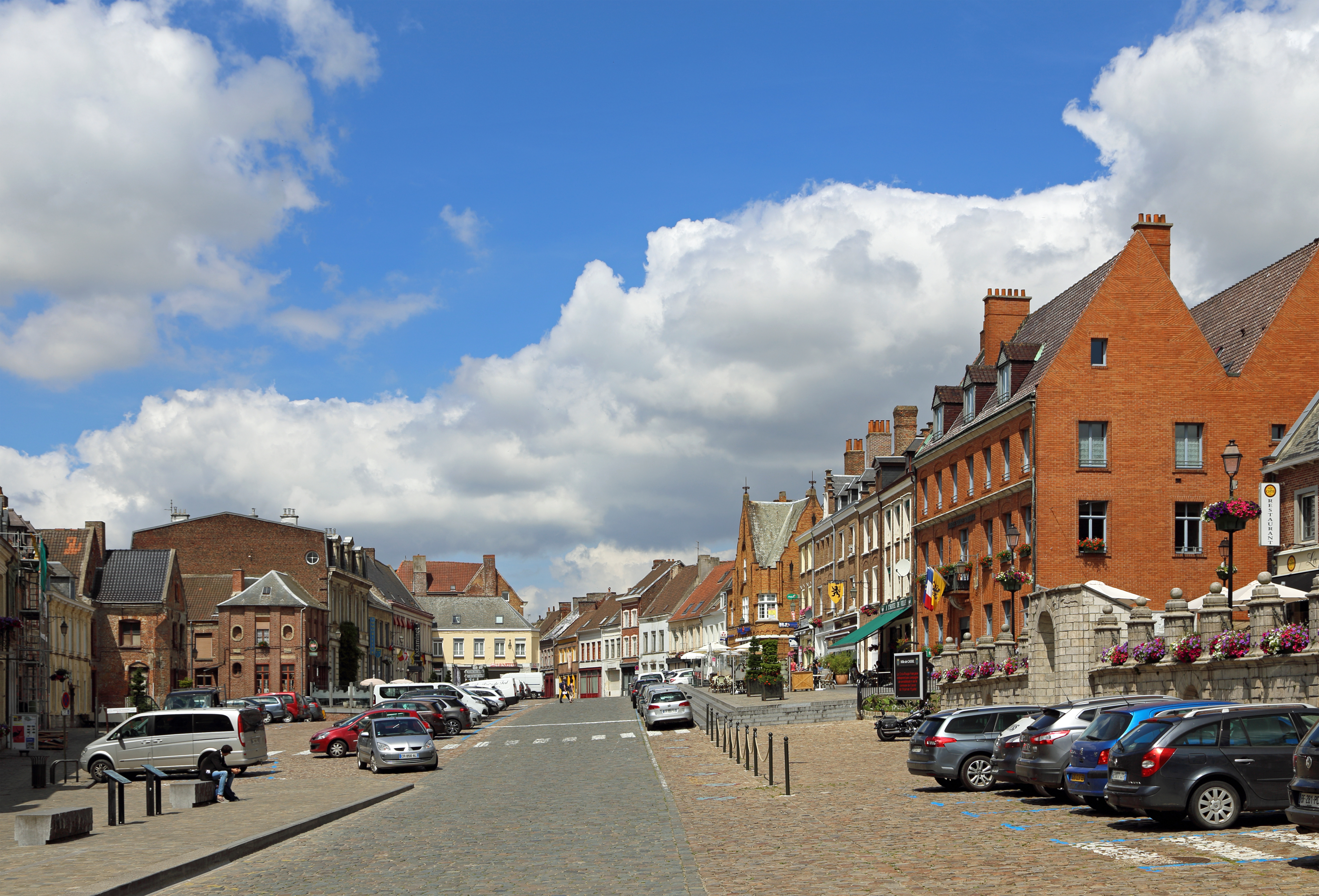
Market Place

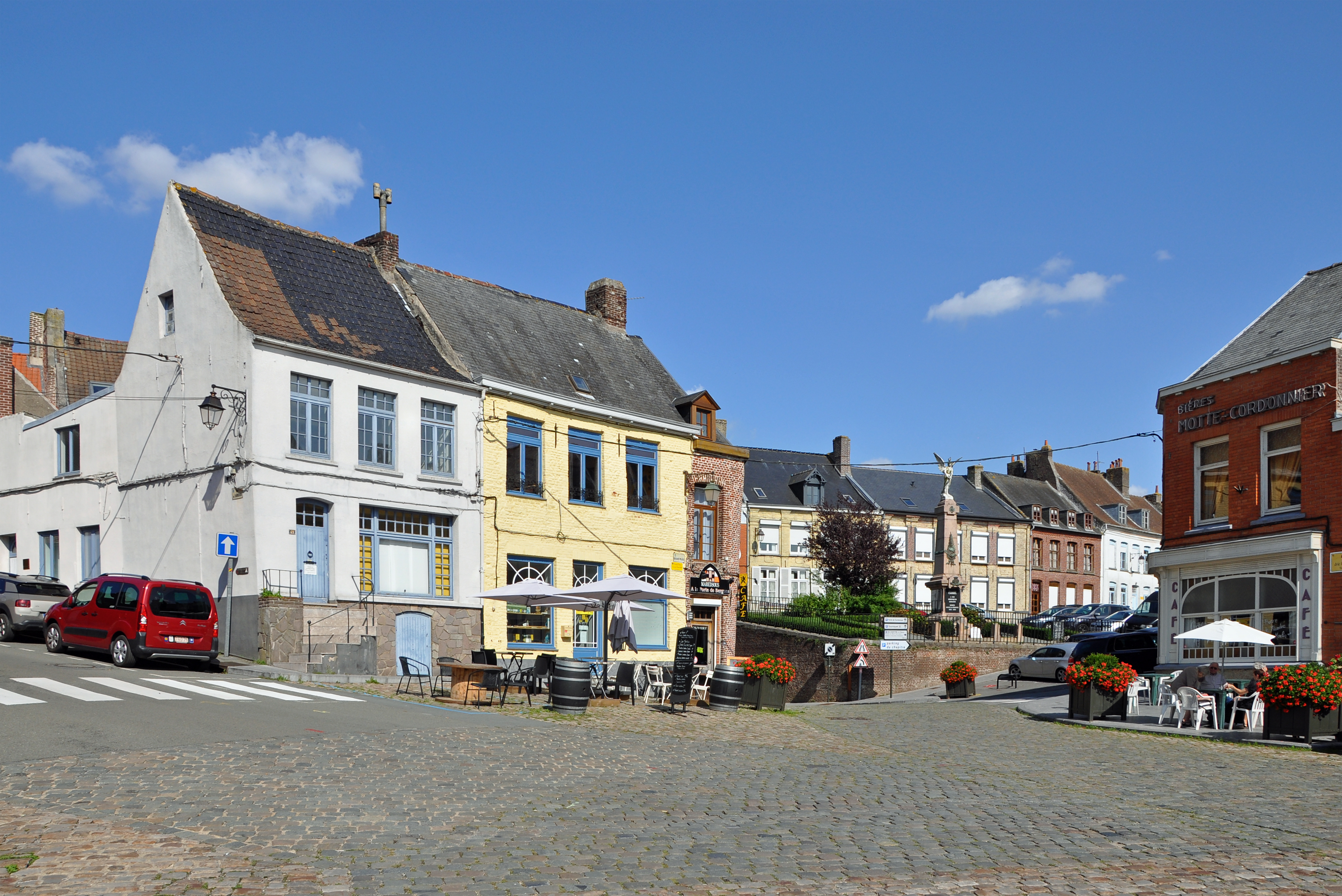
A corner of the Market Place, with typical houses

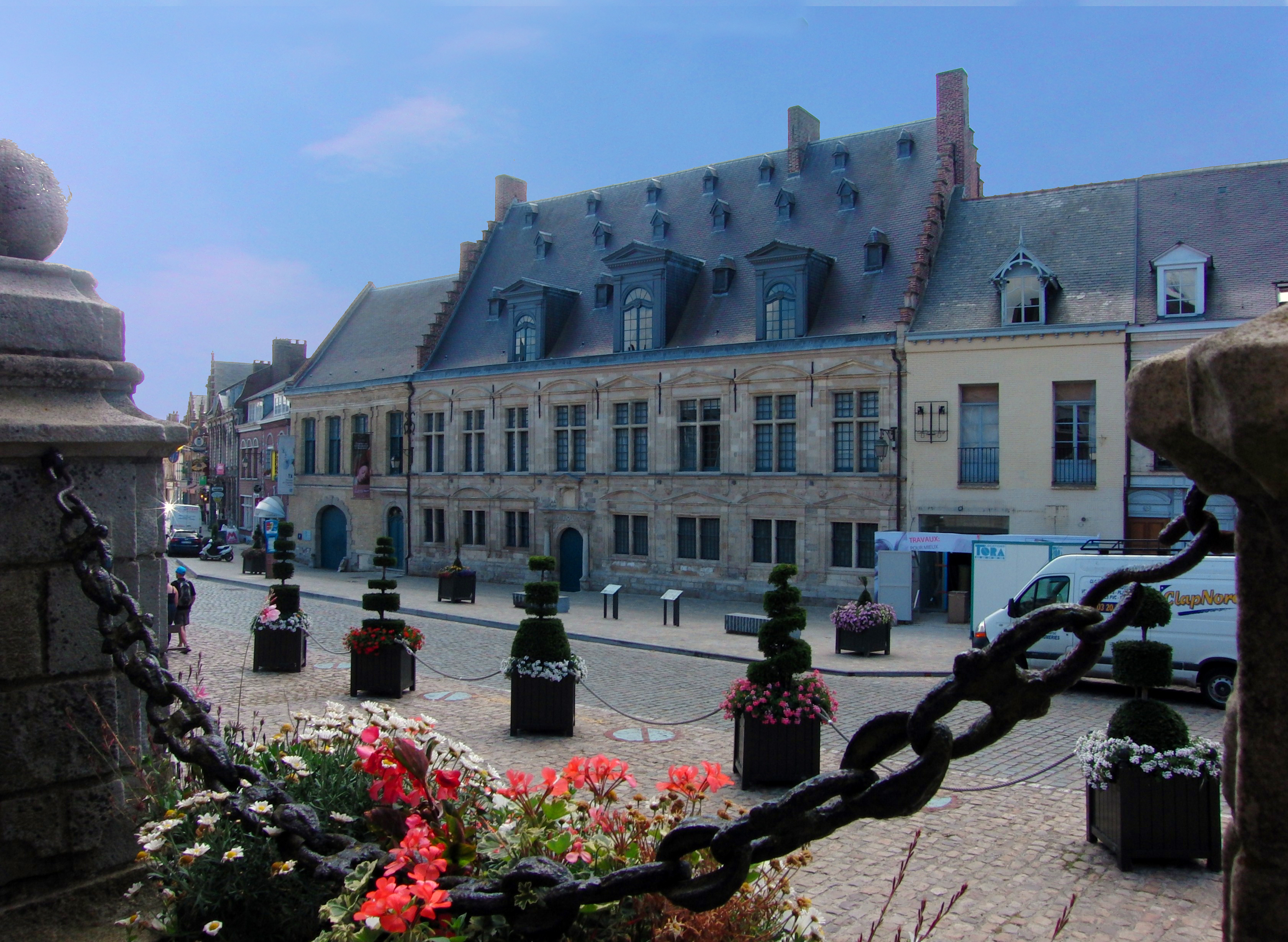
Former Landhuis, now Musée de Flandre

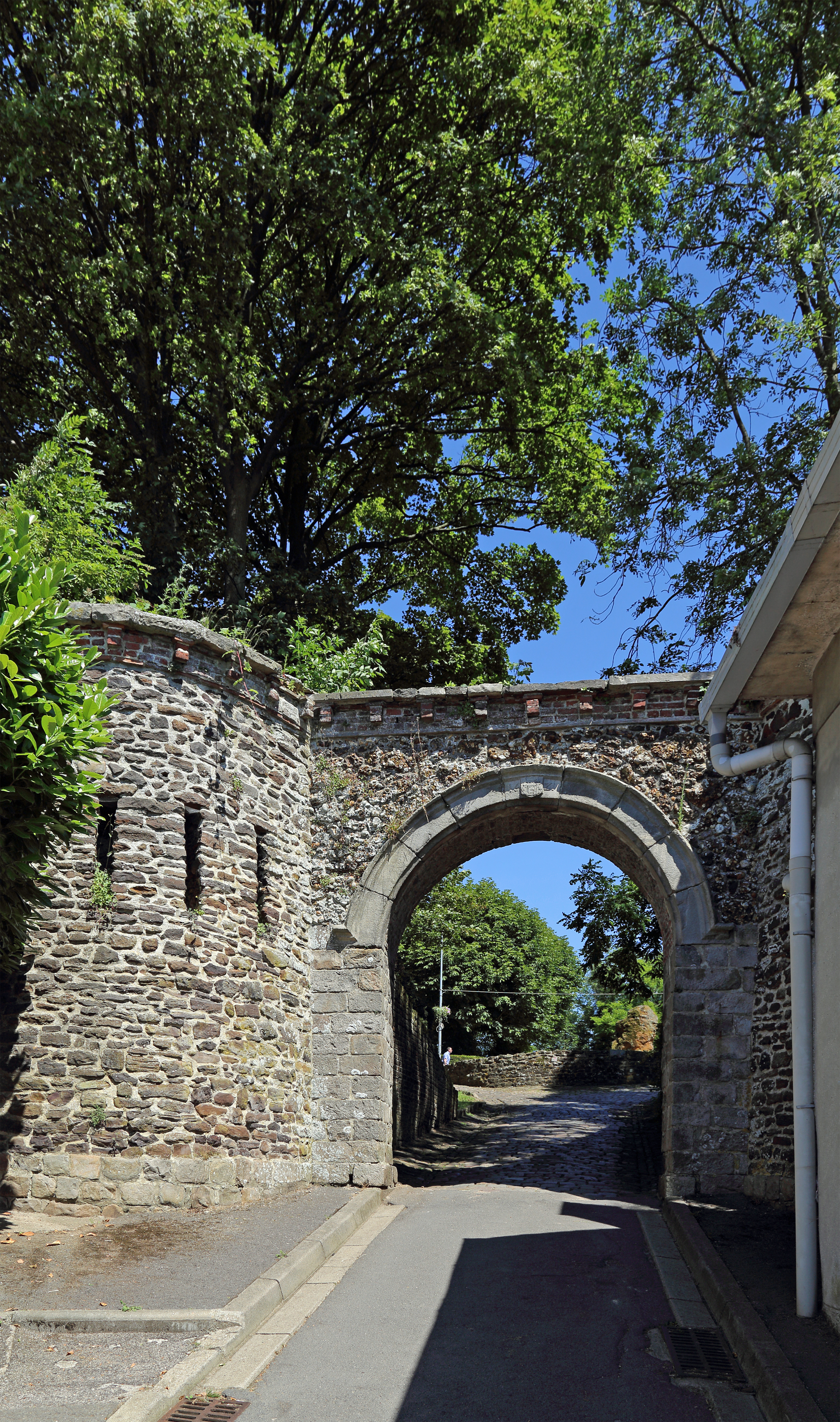
The Porte du Château, entrance of the municipal park on top of Mount Cassel

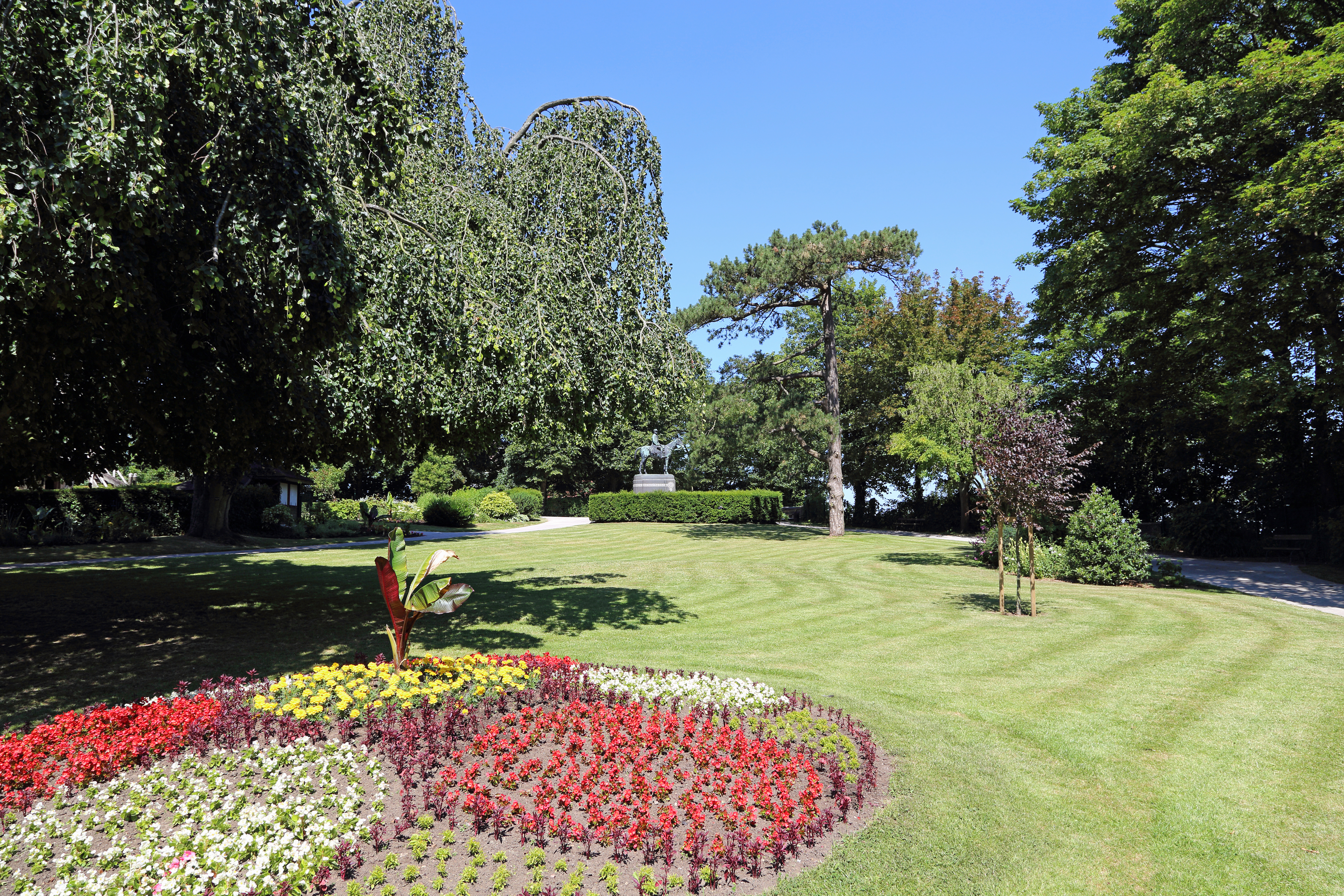
Municipal park

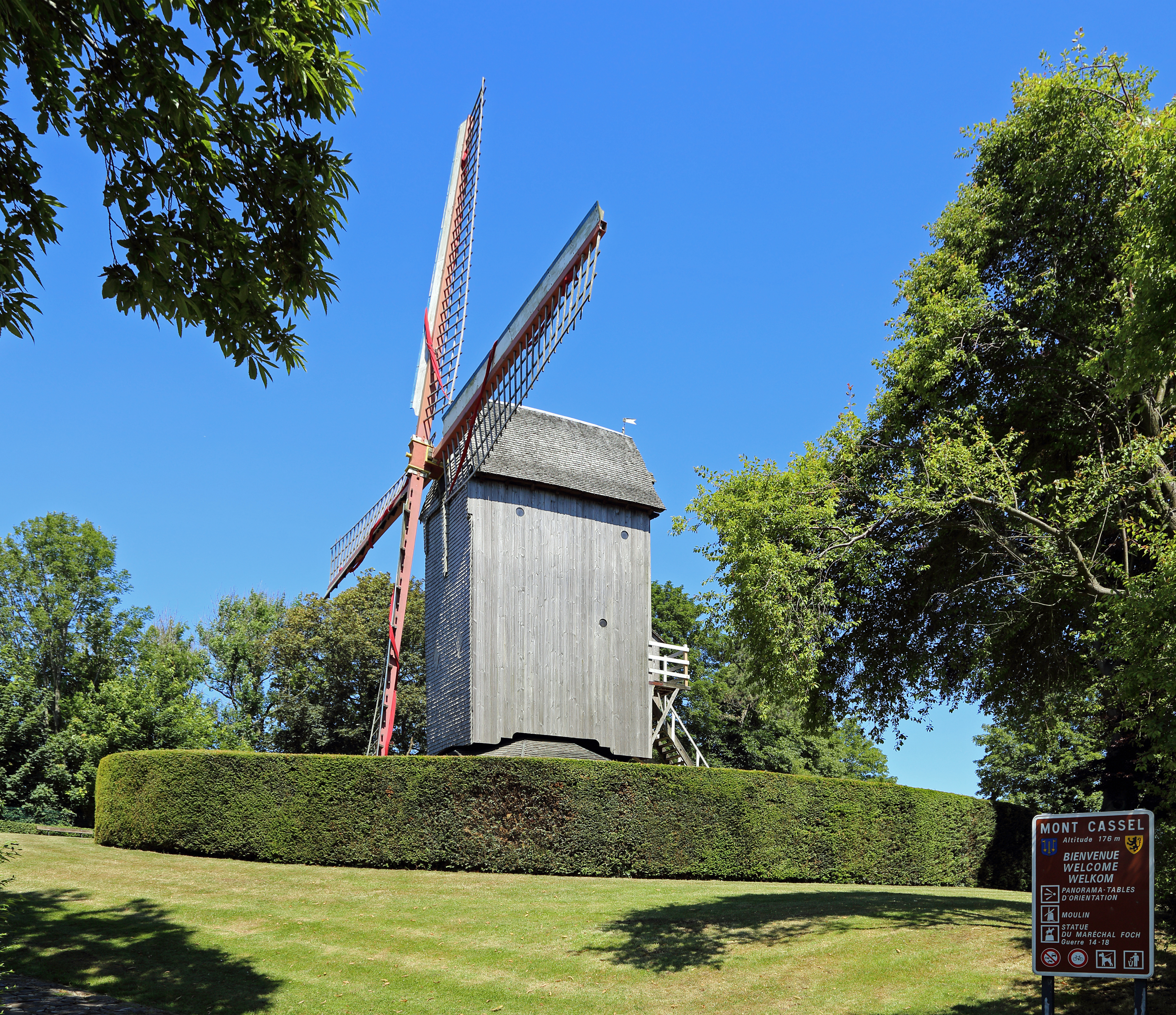
Windmill of Cassel

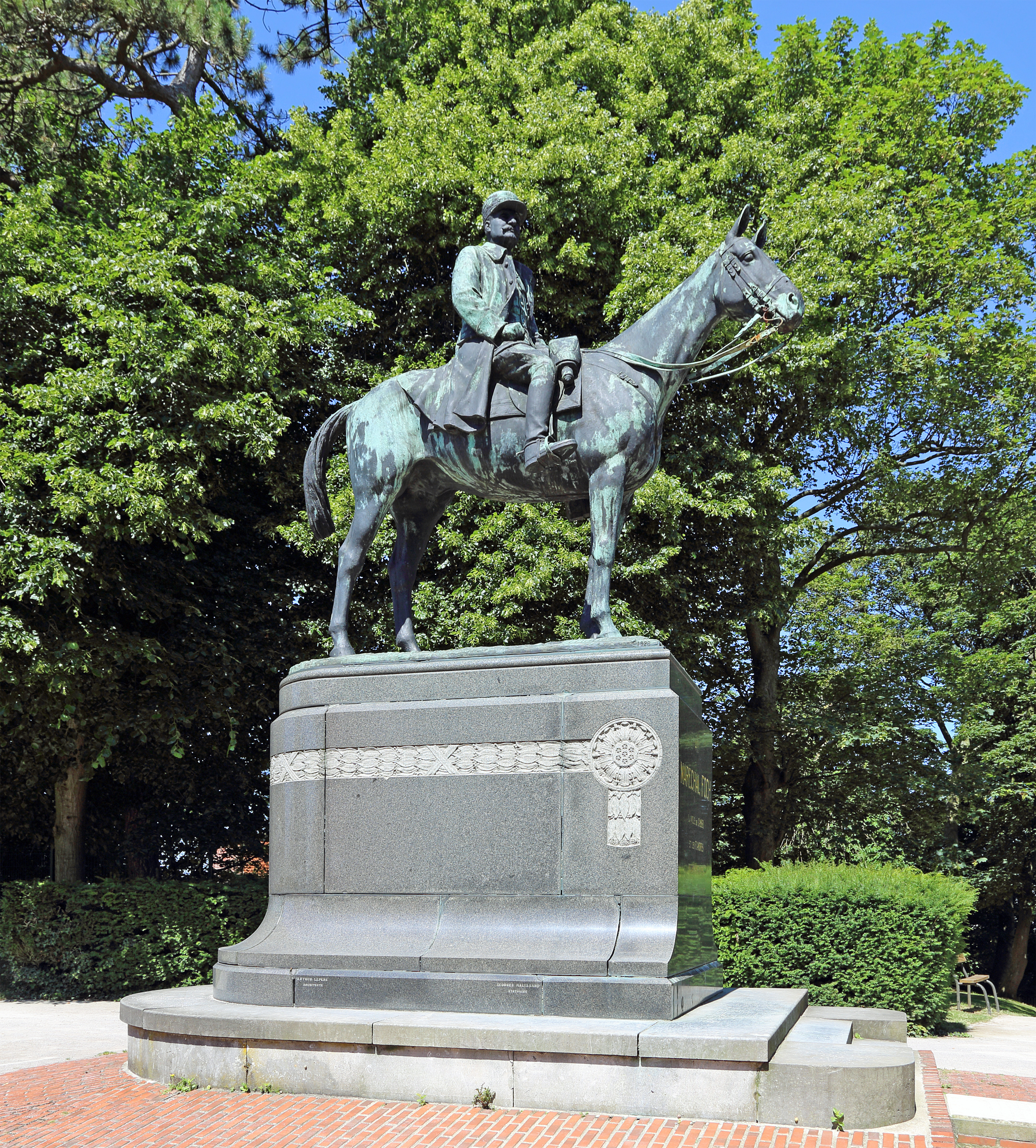
Equestrian statue of Maréchal Ferdinand Foch

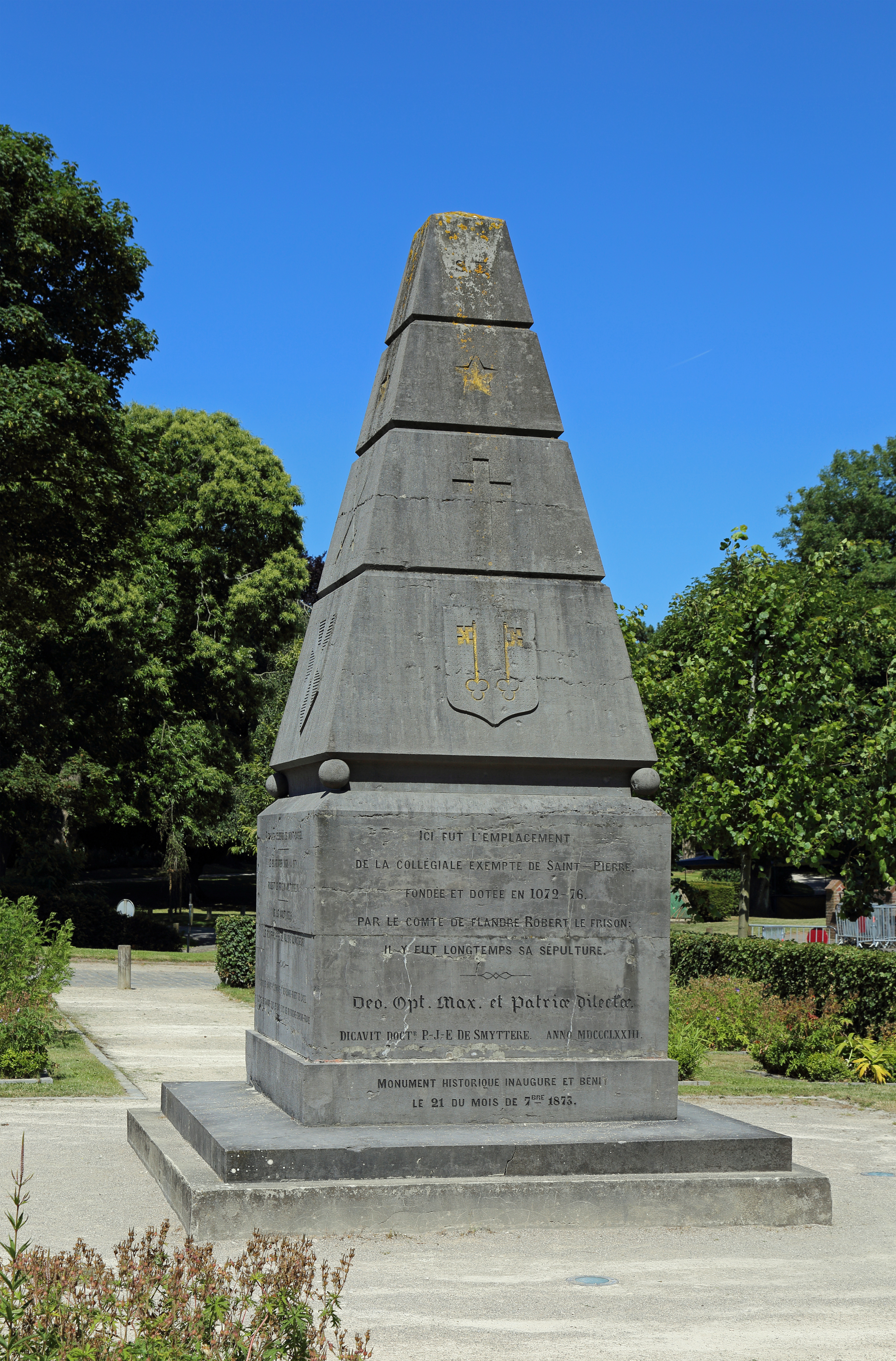
Memorial of the three battles of Cassel (1071, 1328, 1677)

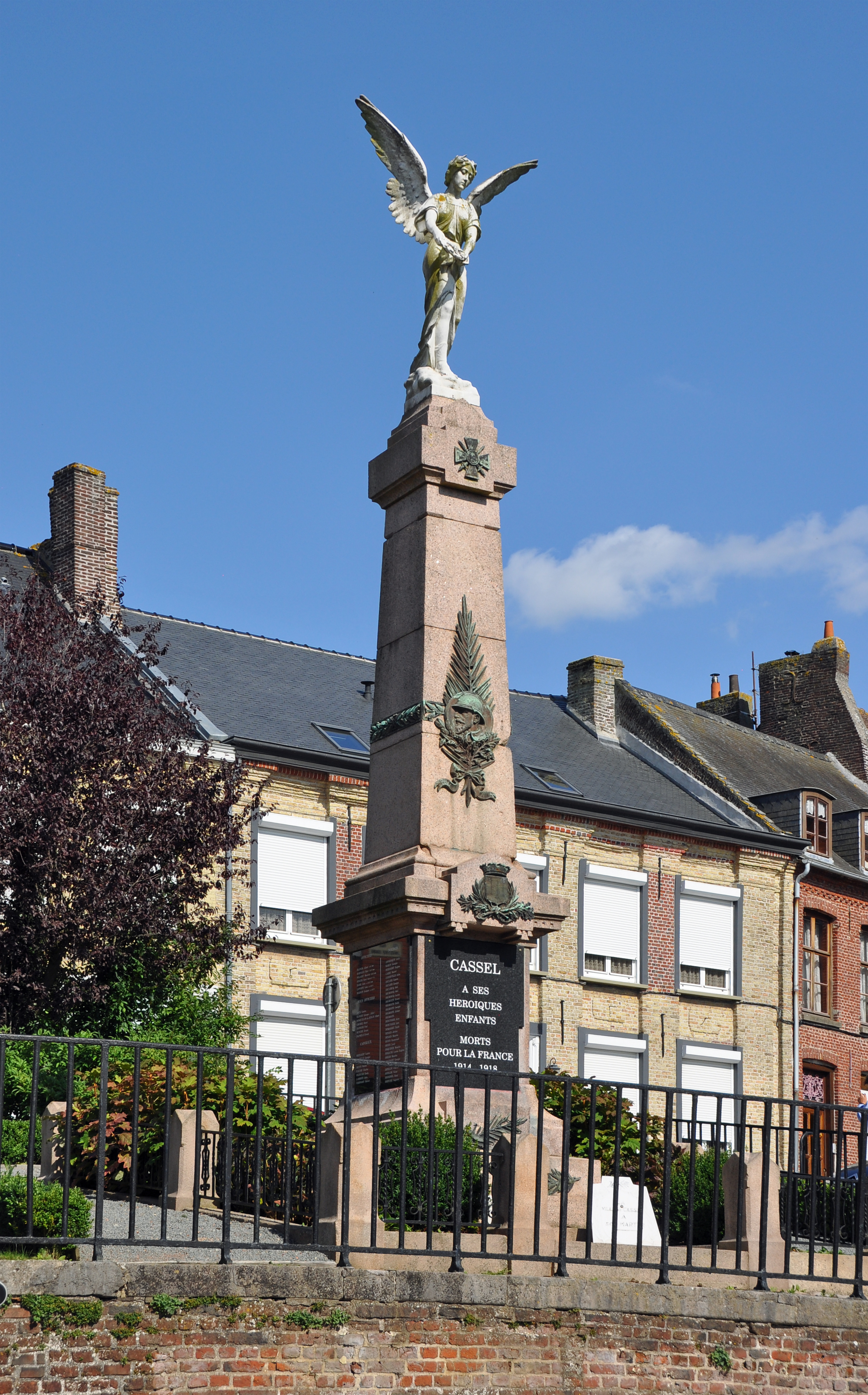
War memorial (WW 1)

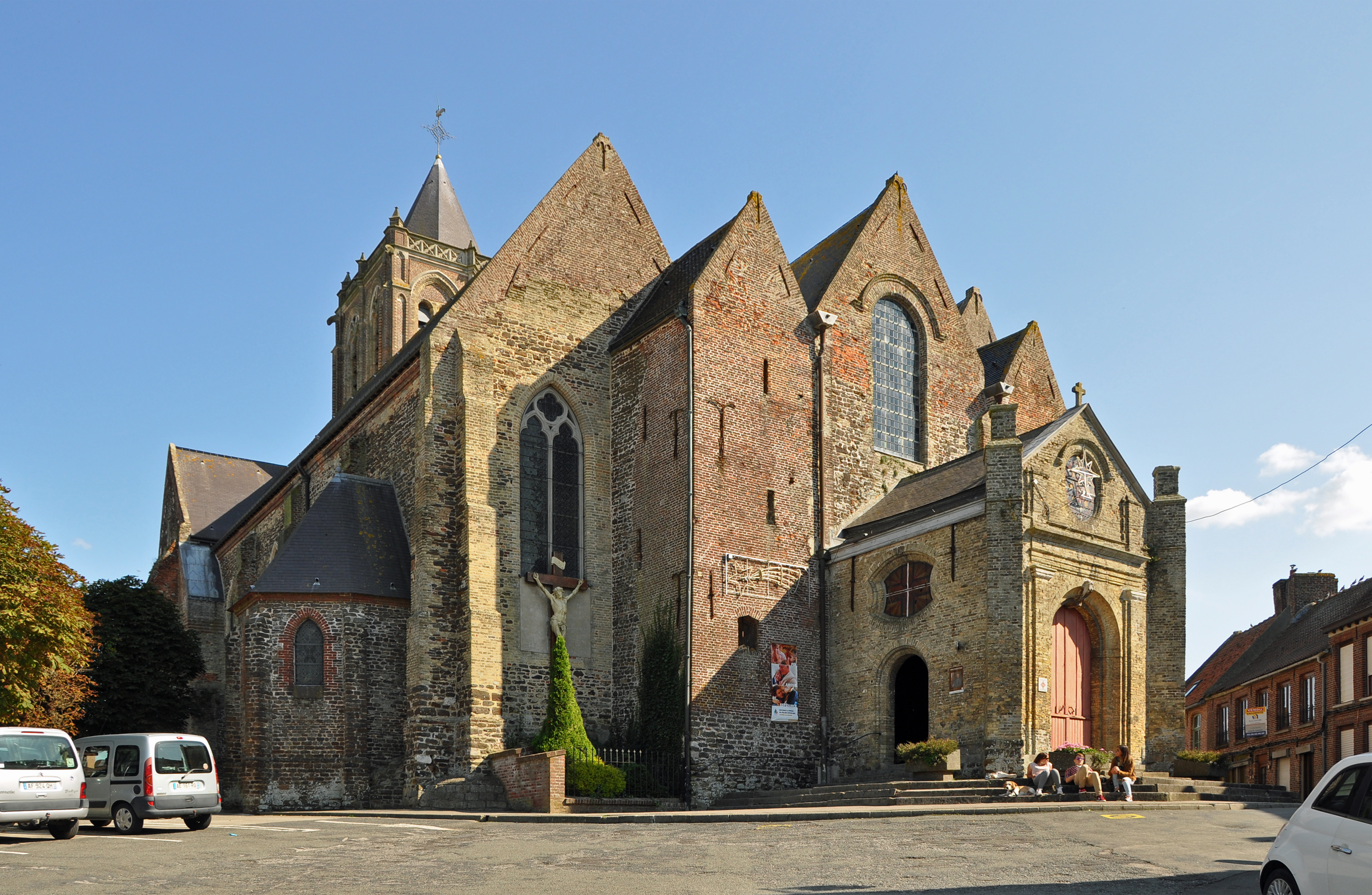
St Mary's church (Collégiale Notre-Dame-de-la-Crypte)

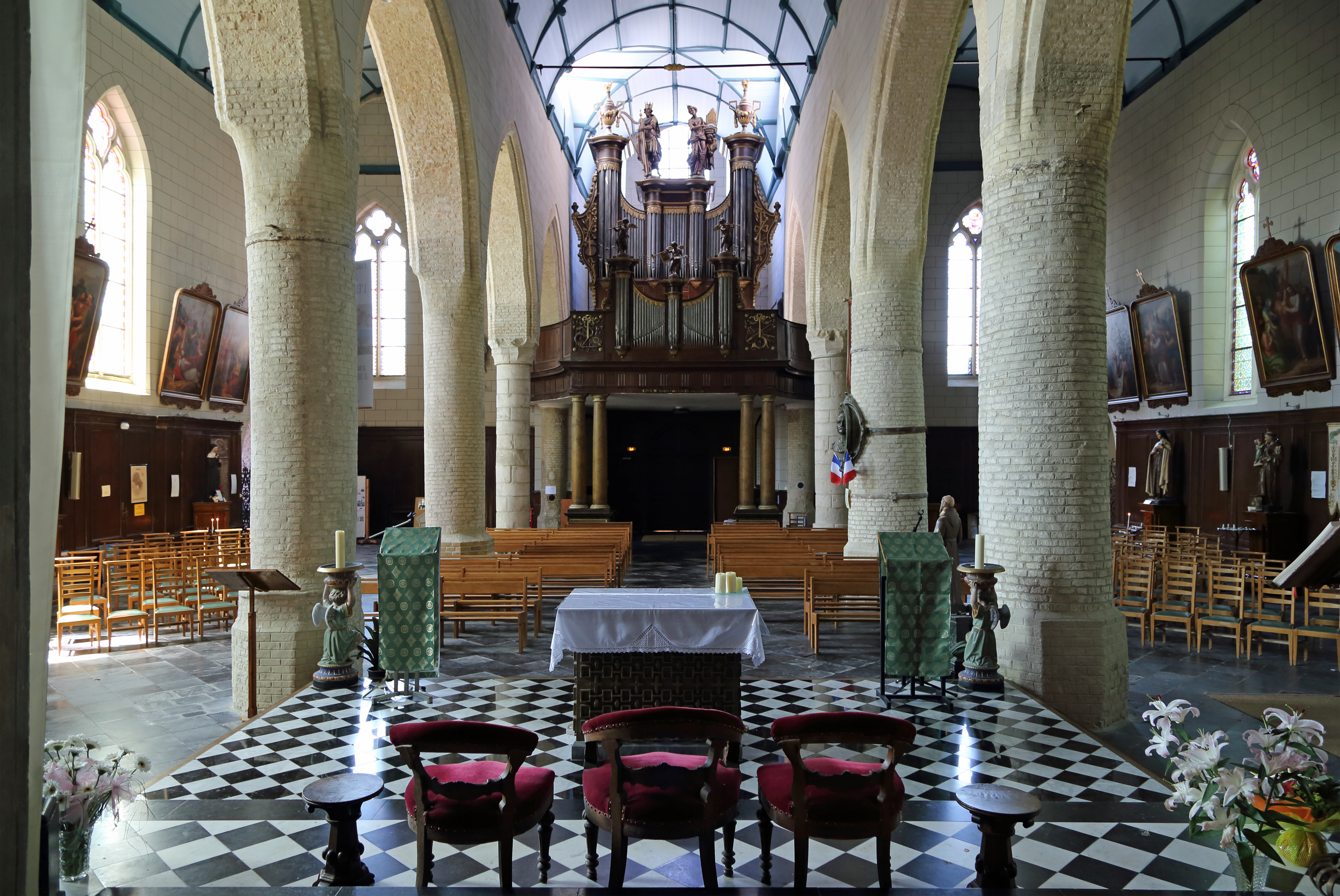
Interior of St Mary's church

== See also ==
- Communes of the Nord department
- French Flemish
