= Wylder =

- Commune
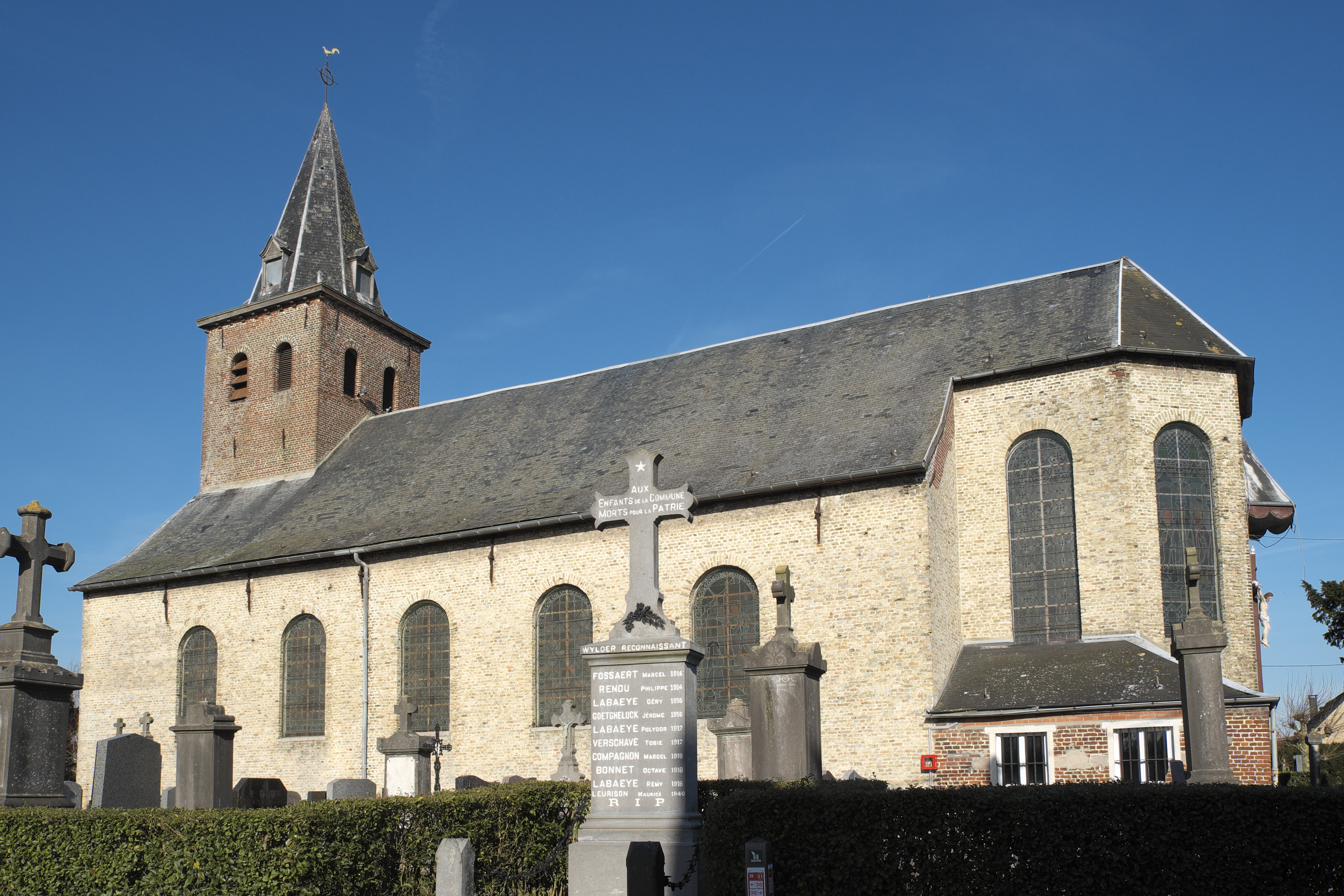
- The church of Wylder, The Great And Holy

- Coat of arms
- Location of Wylder
- Location within France Location within Hauts-de-France
- Coordinates: 50°54′48″N 2°29′36″E
- Country: France
- Region: Hauts-de-France
- Department: Nord
- Arrondissement: Dunkerque
- Canton: Wormhout
- Intercommunality: Hauts de Flandre

Government
  - Mayor (2020–2026): Catherine Clicteur
- Area^{1}: 2.55 km^{2} (0.98 sq mi)
- Elevation: 15 m (49 ft)
- Highest elevation: 22 m (72 ft)
- Lowest elevation: 6 m (20 ft)
- Population (2023): 298
  - Density: 117/km^{2} (303/sq mi)
- Demonym: Wylderois (es)
- Time zone: UTC+01:00 (CET)
  - Summer (DST): UTC+02:00 (CEST)
- INSEE/Postal code: 59665 /59380
- ^{1} French Land Register data, which excludes lakes, ponds, glaciers > 1 km^{2} (0.386 sq mi or 247 acres) and river estuaries.

Wylder is a commune in the Nord department in northern France.

The confluence of the Peene Becque and Yser rivers is located in Wylder.

== Population ==
Historical population
Year	Pop.	±% p.a.
1968	197	—
1975	210	+0.92%
1982	206	−0.27%
1990	213	+0.42%
1999	214	+0.05%
2007	318	+5.08%
2012	330	+0.74%
2017	291	−2.48%
2023	635	+13.89%
Source: INSEE

== Heraldry ==
Arms of Wylder	The arms of Wylder are blazoned : Argent, 5 hunting horns sable tied gules.

== See also ==
- Communes of the Nord department
