= Peene Becque =

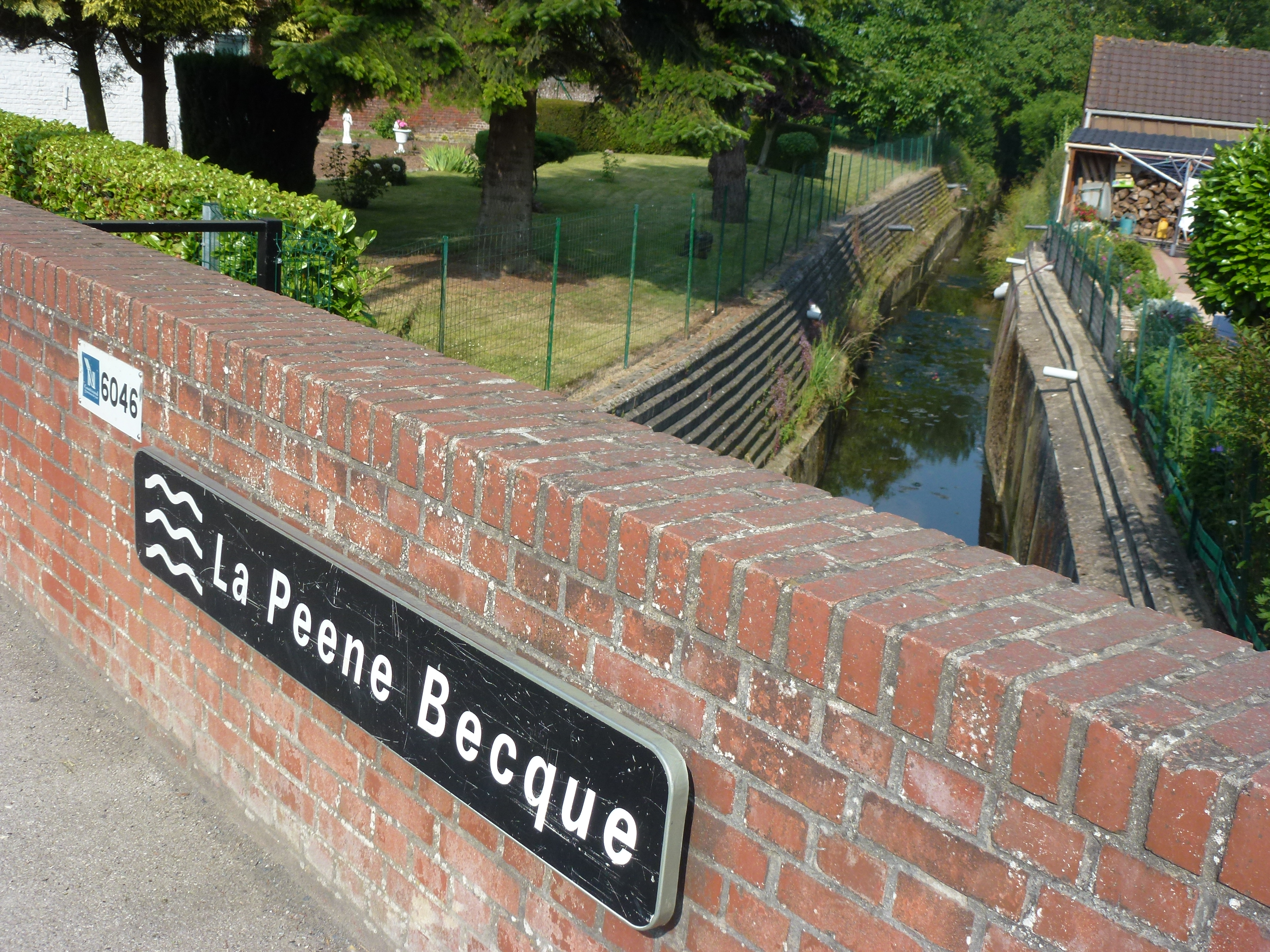
- The Peene Becque in Bavinchove

- Location within France Location within Hauts-de-France

Location
- Country: France

Physical characteristics
- Mouth
  - location: Yser
  - coordinates: 50°54′5″N 2°28′43″E
- Length: 24 km (15 mi)

Basin features
- Progression: Yser→ North Sea

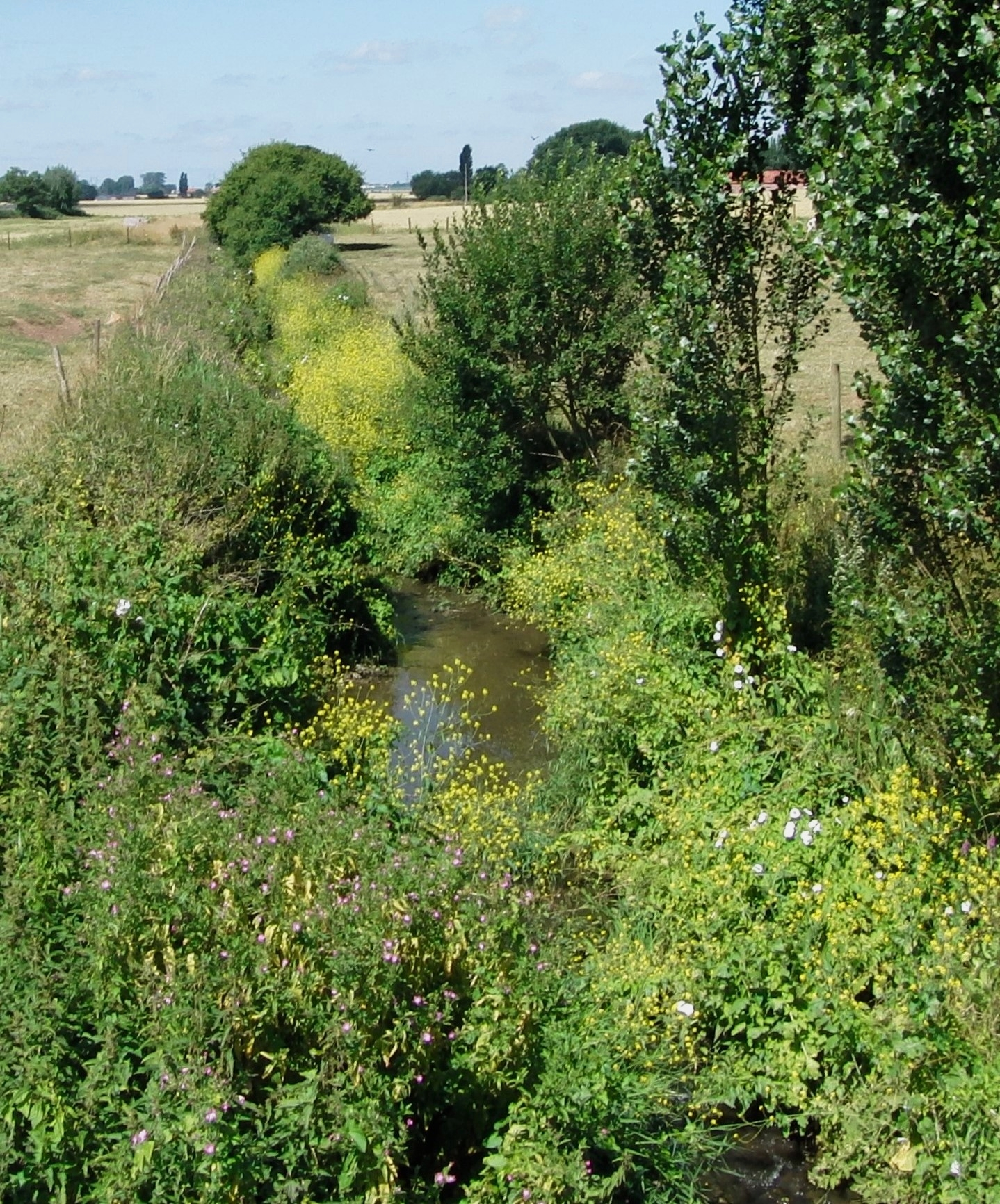
Peene Becque in Zuytpeene.

The Peene Becque (West Flemish: Penebeke) is a small river in the Nord department in France. It is 24 km (15 mi) long. The word Peene may be related to the modern Dutch word Peen that refers to the wild carrot plant (Daucus carota), while becque is the transliteration of the Dutch word beek, referring to a small stream (compare the English word beck).

The Peene Becque has its source in Sainte-Marie-Cappel, south of Mont Cassel, flows first west through Oxelaëre and Bavinchove, then takes a north-eastern direction through Zuytpeene, Noordpeene, Ochtezeele, Arnèke, Ledringhem, Wormhout and Wylder where it ends its course by flowing into the Franco-Belgian river Yser.

The Peene Becque constitutes a natural border between the villages of Arnèke and Ledringhem (to the south), between Ledringhem and Zermezeele and between Ledringhem and Wormhout.

== Water quality ==
According to the organisation Schéma d’Aménagement et de Gestion des Eaux (SAGE) de l'Yser, the water quality of the Peene Becque is poor, with domestic pollution having a greater impact than agricultural pollution, especially in summer when the water level is low.

== Tributaries ==
The Peene Becque has even smaller tributaries, no more than large ditches, like the short one passing through the centre of the village of Ledringhem, the Trommels Becque, looking like an open air sewage serving the La campagnarde neighbourhood; the Zermezeele Becque; the Cray hill becque (4.4 km) crossing Arnèke; or the Lyncke becque (6.7 km) crossing Zuytpeene.

== See also ==
The 1677 Battle of Cassel is also sometime referred as Battle of the Peene.
