= Noordpeene =

- Commune
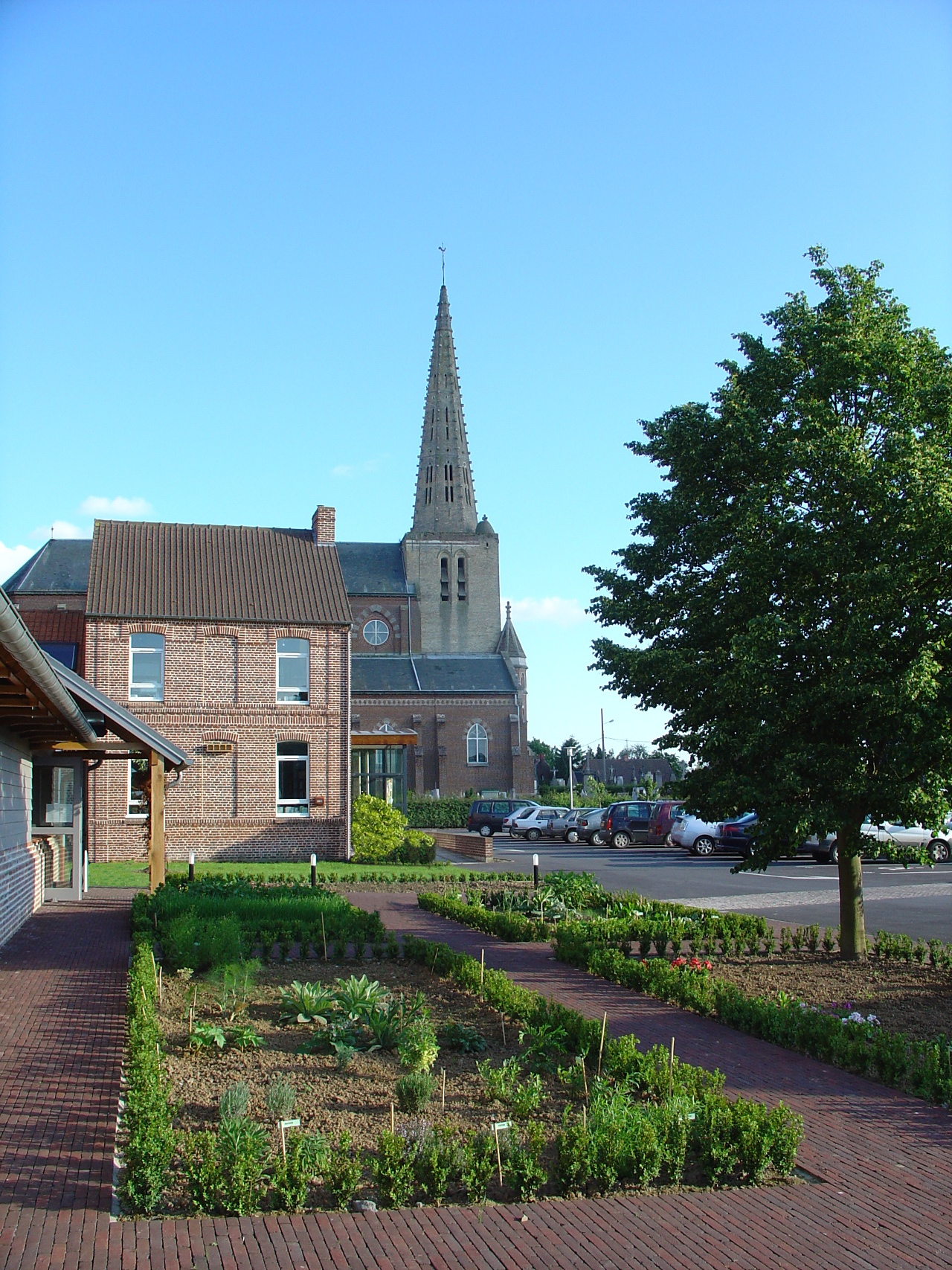
- The church in Noordpeene

- Coat of arms
- Location of Noordpeene
- Location within France Location within Hauts-de-France
- Coordinates: 50°48′23″N 2°23′53″E
- Country: France
- Region: Hauts-de-France
- Department: Nord
- Arrondissement: Dunkerque
- Canton: Wormhout
- Intercommunality: CA Cœur de Flandre

Government
  - Mayor (2020–2026): Thierry Dehondt-Bedague
- Area^{1}: 17.12 km^{2} (6.61 sq mi)
- Elevation: 27 m (89 ft)
- Highest elevation: 68 m (223 ft)
- Lowest elevation: 0 m (0 ft)
- Population (2023): 825
  - Density: 48.2/km^{2} (125/sq mi)
- Demonym: Noordpéenois·e
- Time zone: UTC+01:00 (CET)
  - Summer (DST): UTC+02:00 (CEST)
- INSEE/Postal code: 59436 /59670
- ^{1} French Land Register data, which excludes lakes, ponds, glaciers > 1 km^{2} (0.386 sq mi or 247 acres) and river estuaries.

Noordpeene (Dutch: Noordpene, West Flemish: Nôordpene) is a commune in the Nord department, Hauts-de-France, France.

The small river Peene Becque flows through the village.

== Heraldry ==
Arms of Noordpeene	The arms of Noordpeene are blazoned : Argent, 5 fusils conjoined in bend gules. (probably not heraldically different from West-Cappel)

== See also ==
- Communes of the Nord department
