= Zuytpeene =

- Commune
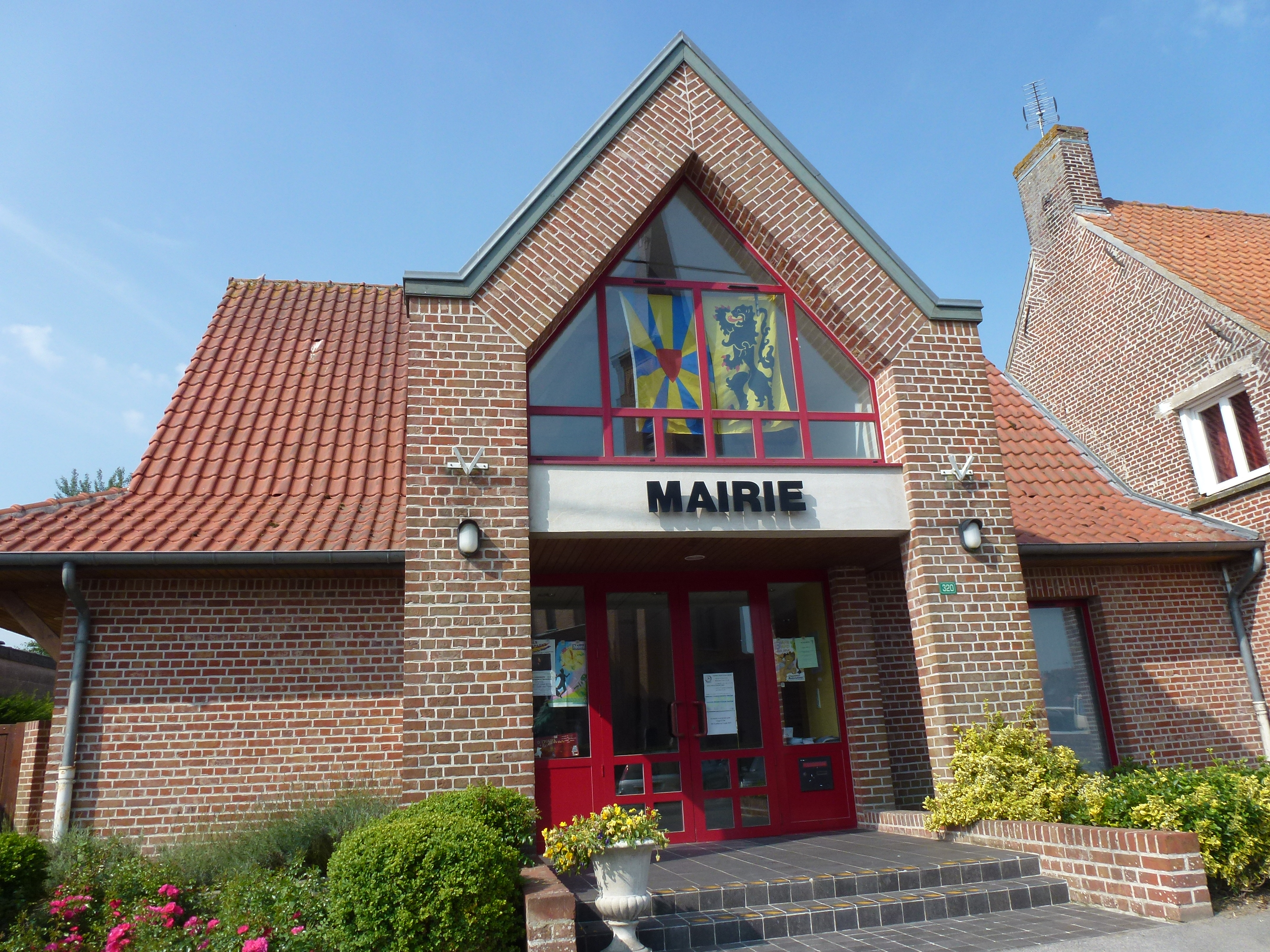
- The town hall in Zuytpeene

- Coat of arms
- Location of Zuytpeene
- Location within France Location within Hauts-de-France
- Coordinates: 50°47′41″N 2°25′39″E
- Country: France
- Region: Hauts-de-France
- Department: Nord
- Arrondissement: Dunkerque
- Canton: Wormhout
- Intercommunality: CA Cœur de Flandre

Government
  - Mayor (2020–2026): Christian Bellynck
- Area^{1}: 11.8 km^{2} (4.6 sq mi)
- Elevation: 27 m (89 ft)
- Highest elevation: 62 m (203 ft)
- Lowest elevation: 18 m (59 ft)
- Population (2023): 557
  - Density: 47.2/km^{2} (122/sq mi)
- Demonym(s): Zuytpeenois, Zuytpeenoises
- Time zone: UTC+01:00 (CET)
  - Summer (DST): UTC+02:00 (CEST)
- INSEE/Postal code: 59669 /59670
- ^{1} French Land Register data, which excludes lakes, ponds, glaciers > 1 km^{2} (0.386 sq mi or 247 acres) and river estuaries.

Zuytpeene is a commune in the Nord department in northern France.

The small river Peene Becque flows through the village.

== Population ==
Historical population

Year	Pop.	±% p.a.
1793	813	—
1800	835	+0.38%
1806	897	+1.20%
1821	913	+0.12%
1831	918	+0.05%
1836	941	+0.50%
1841	932	−0.19%
1846	871	−1.34%
1851	867	−0.09%
1856	802	−1.55%
1861	803	+0.02%
1866	775	−0.71%
1872	784	+0.19%
1876	809	+0.79%
1881	822	+0.32%
1886	840	+0.43%
1891	814	−0.63%
1896	763	−1.29%
1901	744	−0.50%

Year	Pop.	±% p.a.
1906	741	−0.08%
1911	754	+0.35%
1921	672	−1.14%
1926	664	−0.24%
1931	607	−1.78%
1936	596	−0.37%
1946	619	+0.38%
1954	501	−2.61%
1962	463	−0.98%
1968	477	+0.50%
1975	453	−0.73%
1982	438	−0.48%
1990	432	−0.17%
1999	469	+0.92%
2007	560	+2.24%
2012	532	−1.02%
2017	524	−0.30%
2023	557	+1.02%

Source: EHESS and INSEE

== Heraldry ==
Arms of Zuytpeene	The arms of Zuytpeene are blazoned : Azure, a fess between 17 billets Or, arranged 5 and 4 in chief and 4,3 and 1 in base.

== See also ==
- Communes of the Nord department
