= Godelieve =

Flemish saint (1052–1070)

Saint Godelieve
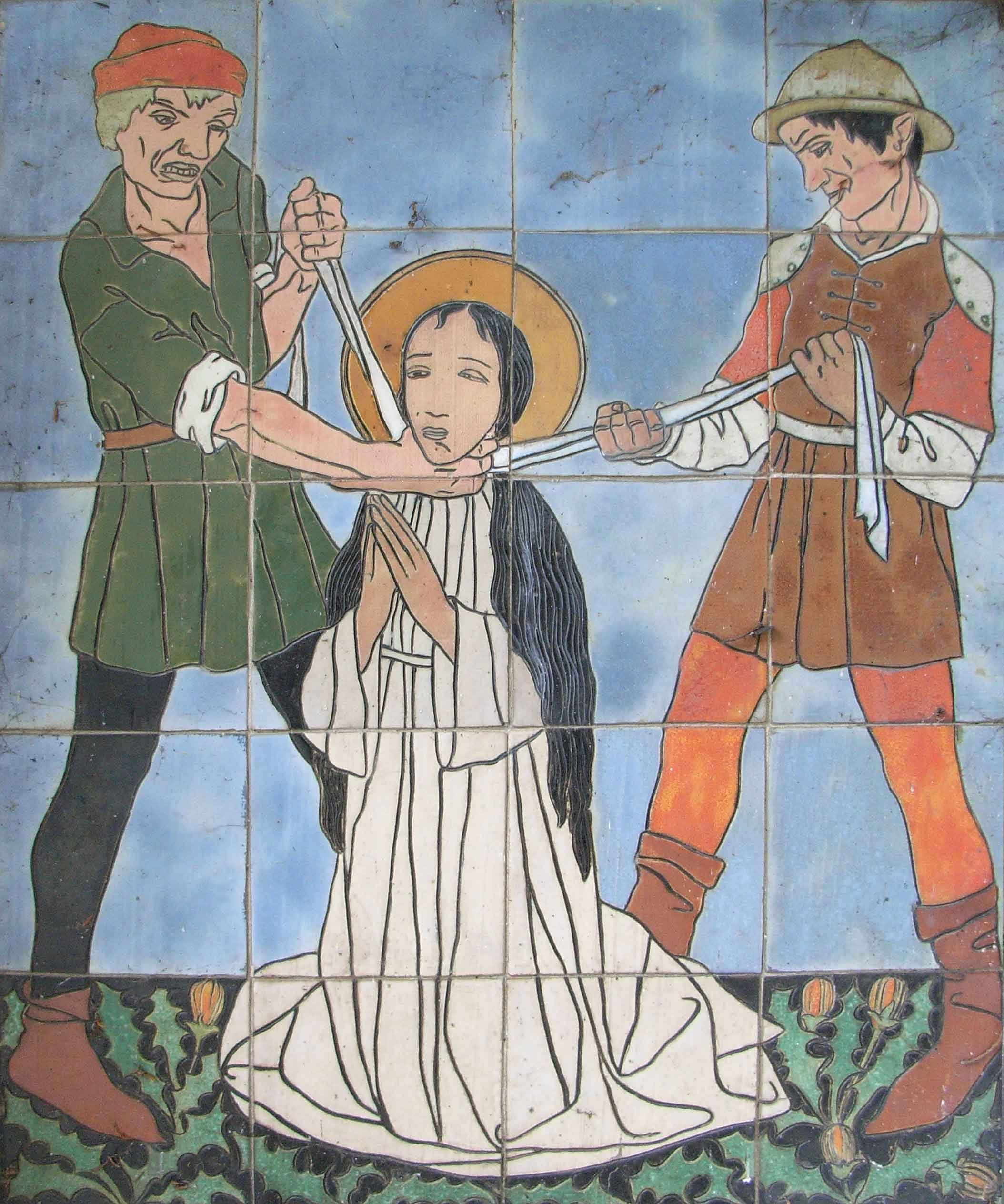
- The Strangulation of Godelina. Image in Procession Chapel in Gistel, Belgium.

Martyr
- Born: c. 1052
- Died: c. 1070; Gistel
- Venerated in: Catholic Church
- Canonized: 30 July 1084, Gistel by Pope Urban II
- Feast: 6 July
- Attributes: crown, well, being strangled
- Patronage: invoked against throat trouble peaceful marriage

Godelieve (also known as Godeleva, Godeliève, and Godelina; Dutch: Sint-Godelieve) (c. 1052 – 6 July 1070) was a Flemish saint. She was a young, pious noblewoman who remained faithful to her husband, even as she was rejected by him directly after their marriage. Her husband had her eventually murdered. Soon after her death, veneration started and she was canonized as a saint in 1084.

== History ==
Godelieve was born around 1052 in Londresfort near Boulogne. Her parents married her to Bertolf, a nobleman from Gistel. Bertolf had his wife killed around 1070, probably because the couple remained childless. Soon after her death, she was venerated as a saint. The fate of Bertolf is not recorded, but De Maesschalck speculates he may have been pardoned by Robert I, Count of Flanders, by supporting the revolt of Robert I against his nephew Arnulf III.

On 30 July 1084, Godelieve was canonized as a saint by the Bishop of Tournai-Noyon, Radbot II. In preparation of the canonization, Radbot commissioned a hagiography from Drogo, a monk from the Abbey of Saint Winnoc. Drogo travelled to Gistel to record the testimonies of the remaining witnesses. In his Vita Godeliph, Drogo focussed on his commission to write a hagiography: the life, sufferings, martyrdom and some miracles attributed to her are well described but he does not explain satisfactory why Bertolf rejected his wife, nor does he care to mention what became of Bertolf and the murderers of Godelieve.

Godelieve was canonized in the presence of the bishop, the wife of Robert I, Count of Flanders, Gertrude of Saxony, the Abbot of Abbey of Saint Winnoc and a number of clergymen. Her corpse was exhumed and reburied in a wooden shrine in the church of Gistel. A parchment with an account of the canonization written in Latin by Desiderius, the secretary of the bishop, was added into the shrine. On 15 May 1380 the wooden shrine was replaced with a more valuable, silver-plated one. The Desiderius text was found to be in very bad shape and was rewritten by the chaplain of the Church of Our Lady in Gistel. The shrine was vandalized in the 16th century and restored on 27 June 1557 by the Auxiliary bishop of Tournai. Again the enclosed documents were found to be in degraded state, and new copies were written.

In 1970 the relics of Saint-Godelieve were examined at the Catholic University (KU) Leuven. The skeleton was found to be of a woman measuring between 1m65 and 1m67, and between twenty and twenty-four years old. Phalanx bones were missing as these had been taken away from the shrine in 1625 by bishop Christophori to be distributed among other churches as relics.

== Hagiography ==
The Vita Godeliph states that she was pious as a young girl, and became much sought after by suitors as a honourable, wise, modest and kind woman. Her father choose a nobleman named Bertolf (Berthold) of Gistel as groom, because his parents offered him a huge dowry. But on the day Bertolf brought Godelieve to Gistel for the marriage celebration, he started to hate her under the bad influence of his mother. Bertolf did not even participate in his own, three-day long marriage celebration and ignored Godelieve. Godelieve, however, lived as an obedient daughter-in-law, managing the household well and with Christian charity. Bertold became more dissatisfied with her, and he ordered his servants to provide only bread and water to the young bride. Godelieve shared this food with the poor.

Godelieve managed to escape to the home of her father, Hemfrid, seigneur of Wierre-Effroy. Hemfrid appealed to the Count of Flanders, which referred the case to the Bishop of Noyon and Tournai. Both the count and the bishop ordered Bertolf to restore Godelieve to her rightful position as his wife, and Godelieve returned to Gistel with her husband.

Soon after, Bertolf conceived a plan to murder Godelieve. Two servants, Lantbert and Hacca, lured Godelieve outside at night and strangled her. Once she stopped breathing they drowned her in a well, and then the corpse was put back in bed, trying to make appear Godelieve died a natural death.

== Legend ==
According to legend, Bertolf married again, and had a daughter Edith, who was born blind: the legend states that Edith was cured through the intercession of Saint Godelieve. Bertolf, now repentant of his crimes, went to Rome to obtain absolution. He went on a pilgrimage to the Holy Land, and became a monk at the Abbey of Saint Winnoc at Bergues. Edith founded a Benedictine monastery at Gistel, which was dedicated to Saint Godelieve, which she joined herself as a nun.

== Veneration ==
The Vita Godeliph recorded that soon after her death, veneration started at two places : in the church where she was buried and where she would later be canonized and her relics enshrined, and on the place where she was killed and became a Christian martyr.

As from the 15th century, the scene of the strangulation of Saint-Godelieve was evoked by many Chamber of rhetorics in processions. As from 1870, on the Sunday following 5 July, a large procession dedicated to Saint Godelieve is taking place in Gistel. In 2017, the Godelieve procession was recognized as an Intangible Cultural Heritage.

Godelieve is invoked against problems with the throat, eyes, marital and familial issues. As Godelieve's feast day was on 6 July, like that of Saint Swithun in England and Saint Medard in France, which are connected with the weather, some sources have her listed as a "weather saint", but no Flemish source mentions a connection to the weather.

The abbey of Ten Putte Abbey in Bruges was dedicated to her. A monastery of Benedictine nuns was established on the site of her home, belonging to the Subiaco Congregation. It was closed due to falling numbers about 2020; the building is currently under review by the city/church authorities.

== Depictions ==
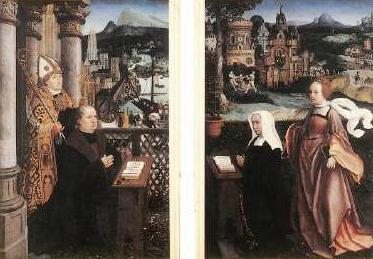
Donor with Saint Nicholas and Wife with Saint Godelina by Jan Provoost

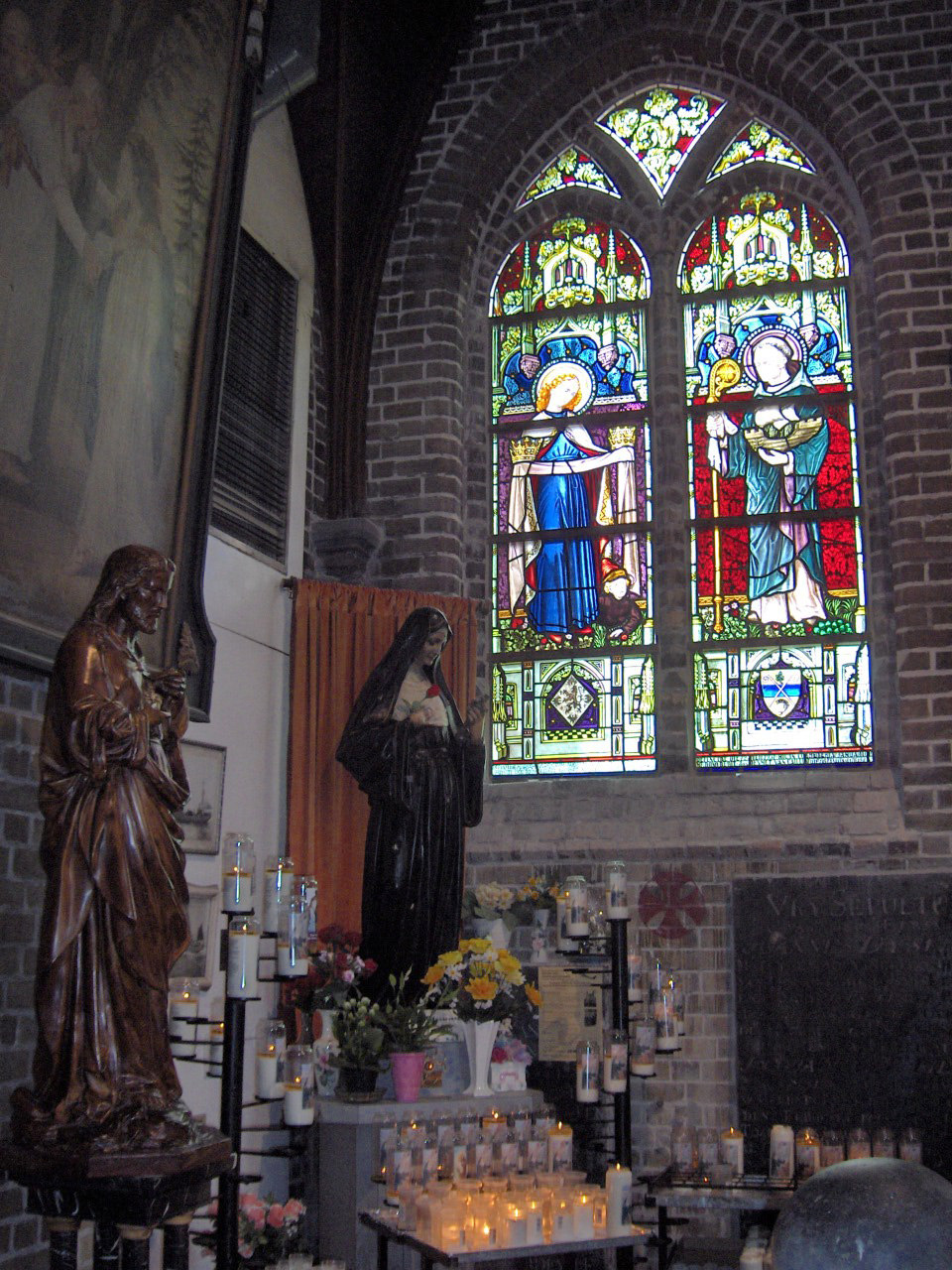
Saint Godelieve and Saint Idesbald in the Onze-Lieve-Vrouw-ter-Duinenkerk, Ostend, Belgium:

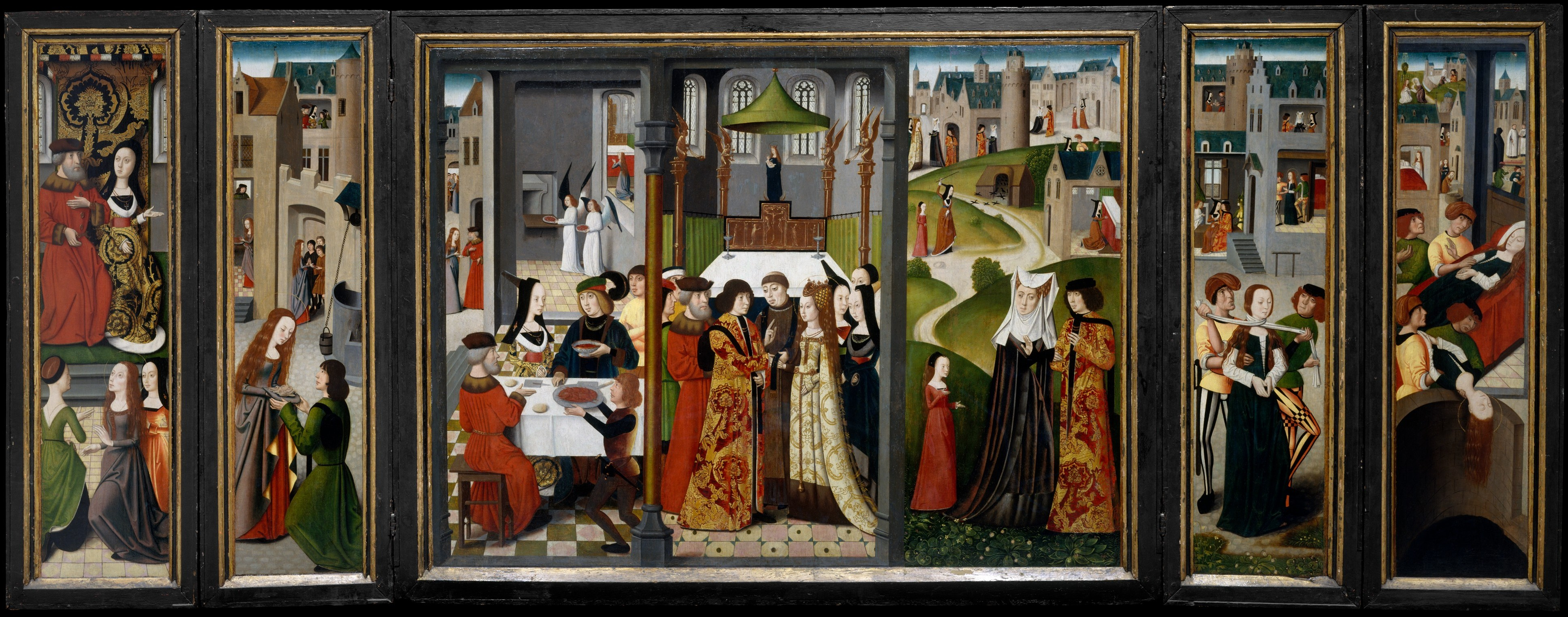
The Godelieve Polyptych, in the Metropolitan Museum of Art in New York City

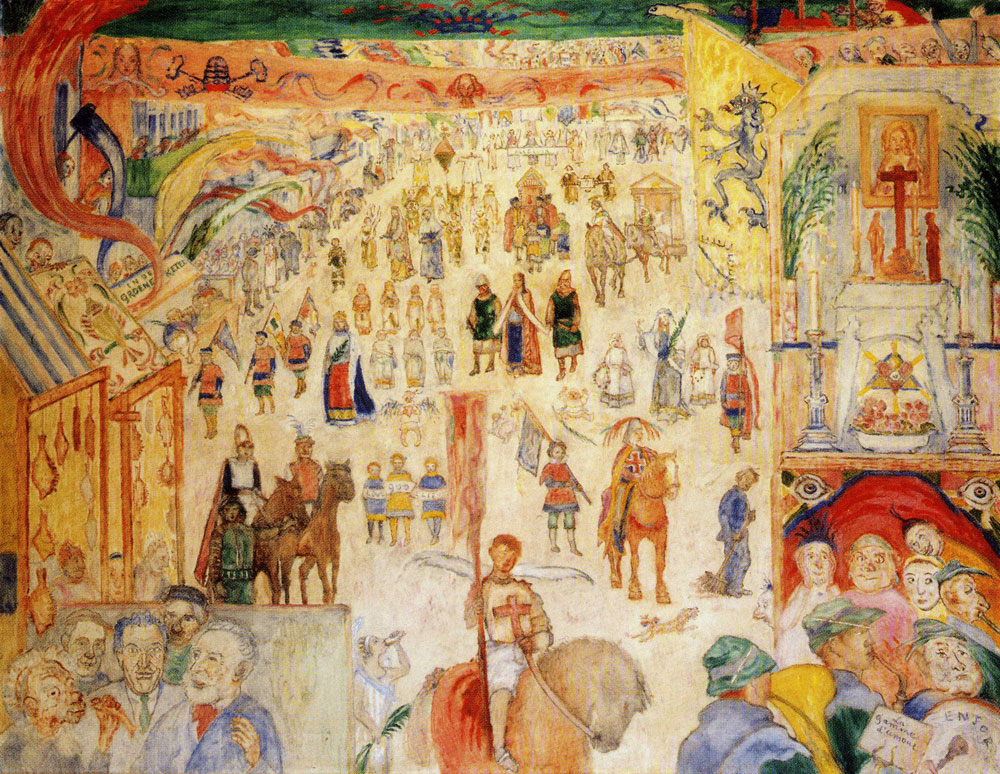
The Procession of Saint Godelieve at Gistel by James Ensor
