= Ten Putte Abbey =

- Abdij Ten Putte or Sint-Godelieveabdij
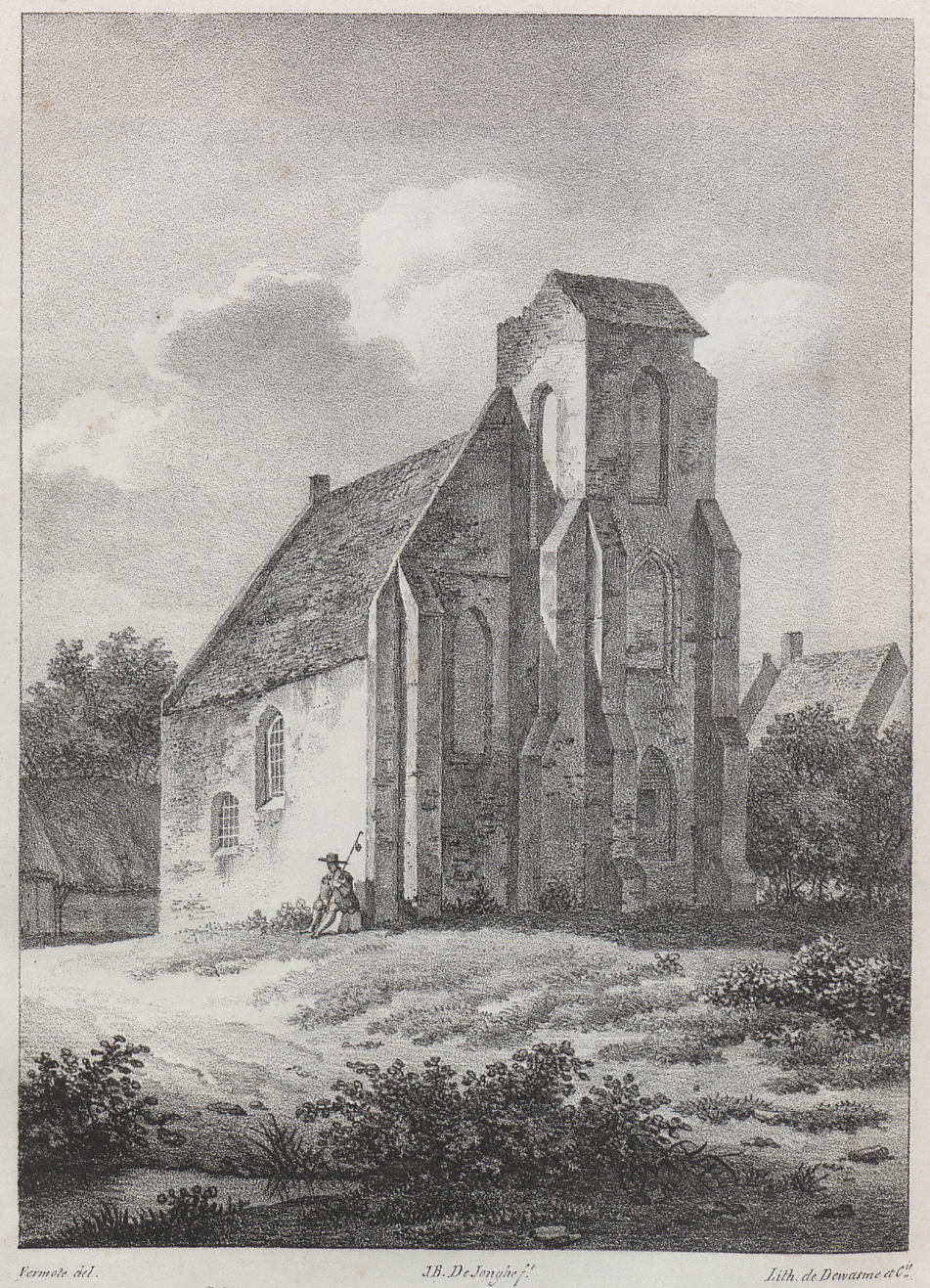
- Saint Godelina / Ten Putte Abbey before the 1890 rebuild

- Location within Belgium

General information
- Location: Abdijstraat 84, Gistel, Belgium
- Coordinates: 51°09′0″N 2°55′08″E

Ten Putte Abbey (also known as the Saint Godelina Abbey) is a monastery with an abbey in Gistel, roughly 8 km (5 miles) to the south of Ostend, in the western part of Belgium. It was built to mark the spot where, in 1070, Saint Godelina was murdered by strangulation and then thrown into a pond. Before 2007 the abbey was home to nine Benedictine nuns, who were members of the wider Subiaco Cassinese Congregation in West Flanders. Since 2007 it has been occupied by brothers and sisters of the "Mother of Peace" community.

Parts of the abbey are sometimes open to visitors including the pond, which has been enclosed as a well, the dungeon where Godelina is said to have been incarcerated, the chapel in which she is believed to have performed a miracle, the Abbey Church and a small recently renovated museum concerning the saint.

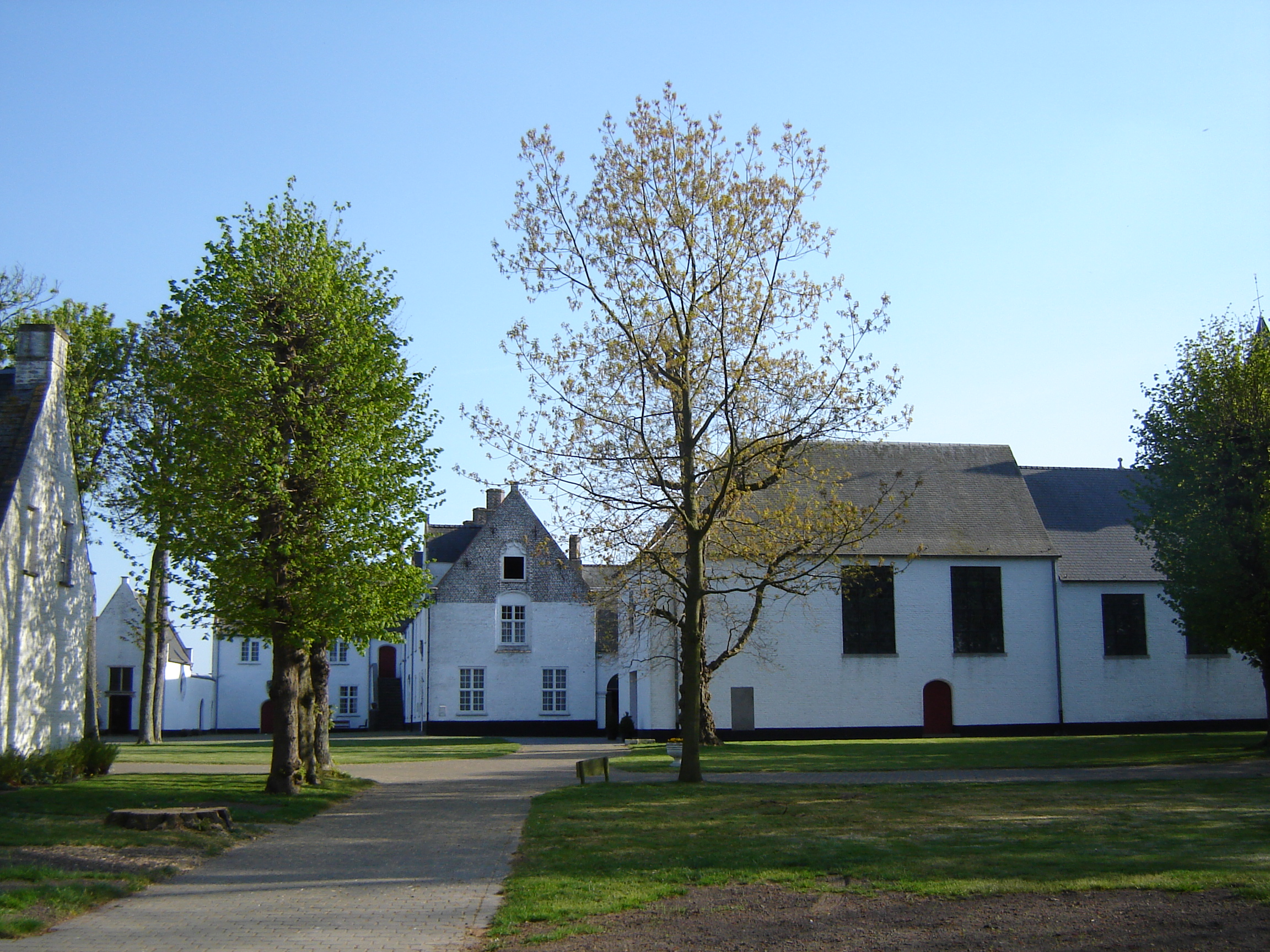

== History ==
The abbey was founded at some point between 1137 and 1171. According to some sources the Benedictine monastery was founded by Edith, a daughter to Bertolf of Gistel by his second marriage, which was to the woman who later became Saint Godelina. Edith was born blind, but received her sight when she washed her eyes in water from the pond in which the body of her mother, the murdered Saint Godelina had been thrown. Edith then went on to become the first abbess of the Benedictine monastery for nuns. This story appears in Latin and low-German language biographical works on the saint, but doubts about it persist. It is undermined by a belief in other quarters that the marriage of Godelina to Bertolf of Gistel was never consummated. Monastic records in any case indicate that the abbey was indeed founded during the twelfth century.

The religious wars that erupted in the second half of the sixteenth century extended destructively into Flanders. On 12 October 1578 the Abbey was attacked by an army of bandits and left in ruins. Only the fourteenth century tower was left standing. The nuns abandoned the undefended site, ending up in Bruges where eventually, in 1623, they set up a new abbey within the city walls in Bovary Street ("de Boeveriestraat") on the south side of the city. The abbey church in Gistel was reconstructed in 1614/15 and became a pilgrimage destination, particularly popular in July when St Godelina's Day is celebrated. Nevertheless, the rest of the site remained in ruins till long after the end of the Eighty Years' War. It continued to be the property of the nuns, now safely in Bruges, till shortly after the outbreak, in 1789, of the French Revolution.

In 1815, following the forced sale of the assets of the bankrupted Anselme de Peellaert, the site came into the hands of a man called Louis Joseph Bortier. He and his immediate heirs left the abbey to deteriorate further. However, in 1889 what remained of the chapel and its estate was sold to the polymath architect Jean-Baptiste Bethune. After a break of 313 years, nuns now returned to St. Godelina. Twelve sister moved in from Bruges. On 2 July 1891 the bishop was able to consecrate a rebuilt monastery, in the neo-Gothic style, using plans drawn up by Bethune. Of the old ruins, only the shell of the old fourteenth century tower was left. The monastery was restored to the status of a Priory in 1891, becoming an Abbey again in November 1934.

Further extensive building development was undertaken between 1952 and 1958 under the direction of the architect Arthur De Geyter.

In 2007 Benedictine nuns were replaced by brothers and sisters from the "Mother of Peace" community. This is a recent order, established in 1992 by Bernard Debeuf and in 1998 recognized by the Bishop of Bruges. The order's spirituality is Marian-Christian and their habits are blue.
