= Léon Danchin =

French artist

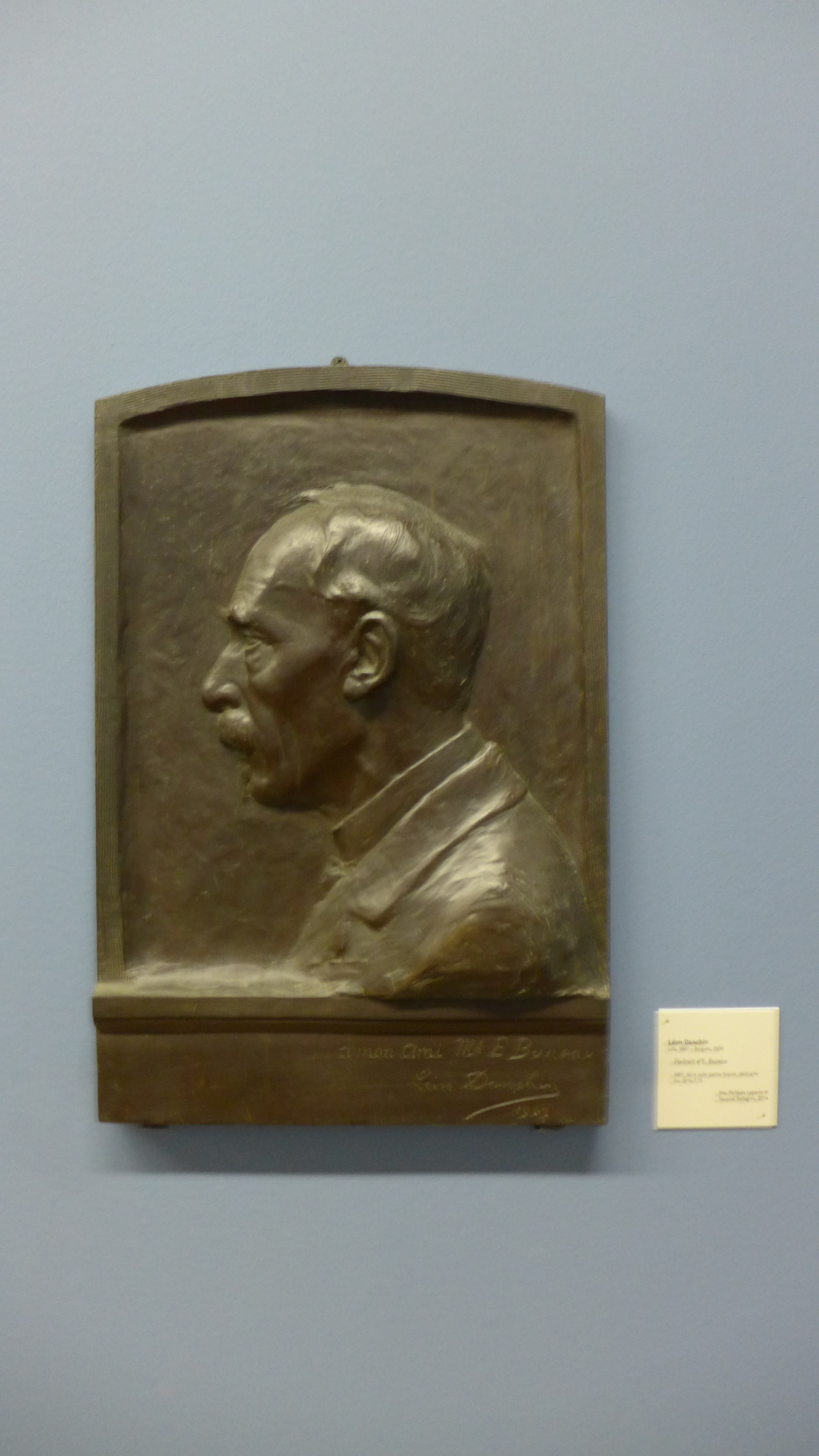
Danchin

Léon Danchin (21 June 1887 - 4 August 1938) was a French artist known for his drawings of animals, primarily sporting dogs. He was also a sculptor.

Danchin was born in Lille (France) on 21 June 1887, the second of six children of Albert and Margaret Danchin. For centuries, the Danchin family lived in northern France, in Anchin in Hainaut, where the family name originated. In 1919, Danchin married Simone Meesemaecker.

For ease of working, Danchin moved his family to Chantilly, close to Paris. His first works sold very well in France, and also in Belgium, the United States, and England. Danchin later moved to Bergues, in the French Flanders, where he was able to hunt regularly. It was during this period that he drew many of the hunting scenes for which he is renowned.

Today, Galerie Hautecœur in Paris manages the re-productions of Danchin's art.

== Sources ==
- Denis Montaut Léon Danchin, animal artist, Ed Montaut, Bordeaux, Saint-Sulpice-et-Monteyrac, 2001
