= Winnoc =

Breton saint

Saint Winnoc
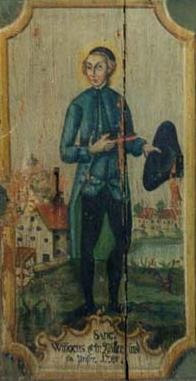
- Saint Winnoc of Flanders
- Born: c. 640
- Died: c. 716/717
- Venerated in: Roman Catholic Church; Eastern Orthodox Church; Anglican Communion
- Feast: 6 November; translation of relics (18 September); Exaltation of Saint Winnoc (formerly kept on 20 February)
- Attributes: abbot with a crown and scepter at his feet, turning a hand-mill, often with a church and bridge nearby; in ecstasy while grinding corn; with Saint Bertin
- Patronage: Millers; against fever; against whooping cough; against drought.

Winnoc (c. 640-c. 716/717) was an abbot or prior of Wormhout. Three lives of the saint are extant (BHL 8952-4). The best of them is the first life, which was written by a monk of Bertin in the mid-9th century or perhaps a century earlier.

== Life ==
Winnoc is generally called a Breton, but the Bollandist Charles De Smedt shows he was more probably of Welsh origin and said to have been of noble birth, of the same house as the kings of Domnonia. Some sources posit that Winnoc's father was Judicael. He may have been raised and educated in Brittany, since his family had fled there to escape the Saxons. He is said to have founded an oratory at St Winnow in Cornwall, though this toponym may be connected with Winwaloe.

Winnoc came to Flanders with three companions, and founded a monastery at Sint-Winoksbergen. He then went to the Monastery of Sithiu, then ruled by Bertin, and was soon afterwards sent to found at Wormhout, a dependent cell or priory (not an abbey, as it is generally called). It became a missionary epicenter for the region. It is not known what rule, Columbanian or Benedictine, was followed at this time in the two monasteries.

When enfeebled by old age, Winnoc is said to have received supernatural assistance in the task of grinding grain for his brethren and the poor. The mill ground the grain automatically due to the intercession of his prayers. A monk who, out of curiosity, came to see how the old man did so much work, was struck blind, but healed by Winnoc's intercession. Many other miracles followed his death, which, according to a fourteenth-century tradition, occurred on 6 November, either 716 or 717.

== Veneration ==
The popularity of Winnoc's cultus is attested by the frequent insertion of his name in liturgical documents and the numerous translations of his relics. He was originally buried at Wormhout, but his relics were translated to Bergues in 899. In the early 11th century the Abbey of Saint Winnoc, a Benedectine monastery, developed around the cult of Winnoc. It is said that people who stood along the route taken by the monks were reported to have been healed of many illnesses, especially coughs and fevers. His relics were invoked against drought. Saint Winoc is the patron saint against fever, whooping cough, and millers. The monastery was burned by Protestants in 1558. Some of Winnoc's relics were destroyed.

His feast is kept on 6 November, that of his translation on 18 September; a third, the Exaltation of St. Winnoc, was formerly kept on 20 February.

== See also ==
- Abbey of Saint Winnoc
