= Bistel =

Belgian videotex service

Bistel - Belgian Information System by Telephone
- Developer: Belgian Government
- Type: Videotex
- Launched: 1986; 40 years ago

Bistel, acronym for Belgian Information System by Telephone, was a Belgian service using the Videotex protocol, established in 1986 at the initiative of the then Prime Minister Wilfried Martens.

It was a federal government service that gave access through videotex to Belga telex news releases, to a press review, judicial databases JUSTEL and CREDOC, economical databases ECOTEL and BUDGETEX.

In 1988, Bart Halewijck, a former PM cabinet adviser and municipal councillor for the same CVP party in Gistel, used the passwords he had kept to view sensitive government informations and showed it to a friend, then to a journalist from De Standaard to prove the security failures. This led to a judiciary "Bistel Case". In spite of recommendations, all passwords had not been changed every six months and many were still the same after two years. Halewijck and his friend, as there was then no specific penal provisions for such crimes, were charged for forgery and use of forgery, theft of energy with burglary, forgery by an official of a telegraphic despatch (an article of the Belgian Penal Code never used since 1911) and destruction of State property. The two first ever "Belgian hackers" got only light penalties but the case showed the urgent need for a specific legislation.
