= Gistel =

- City and municipality
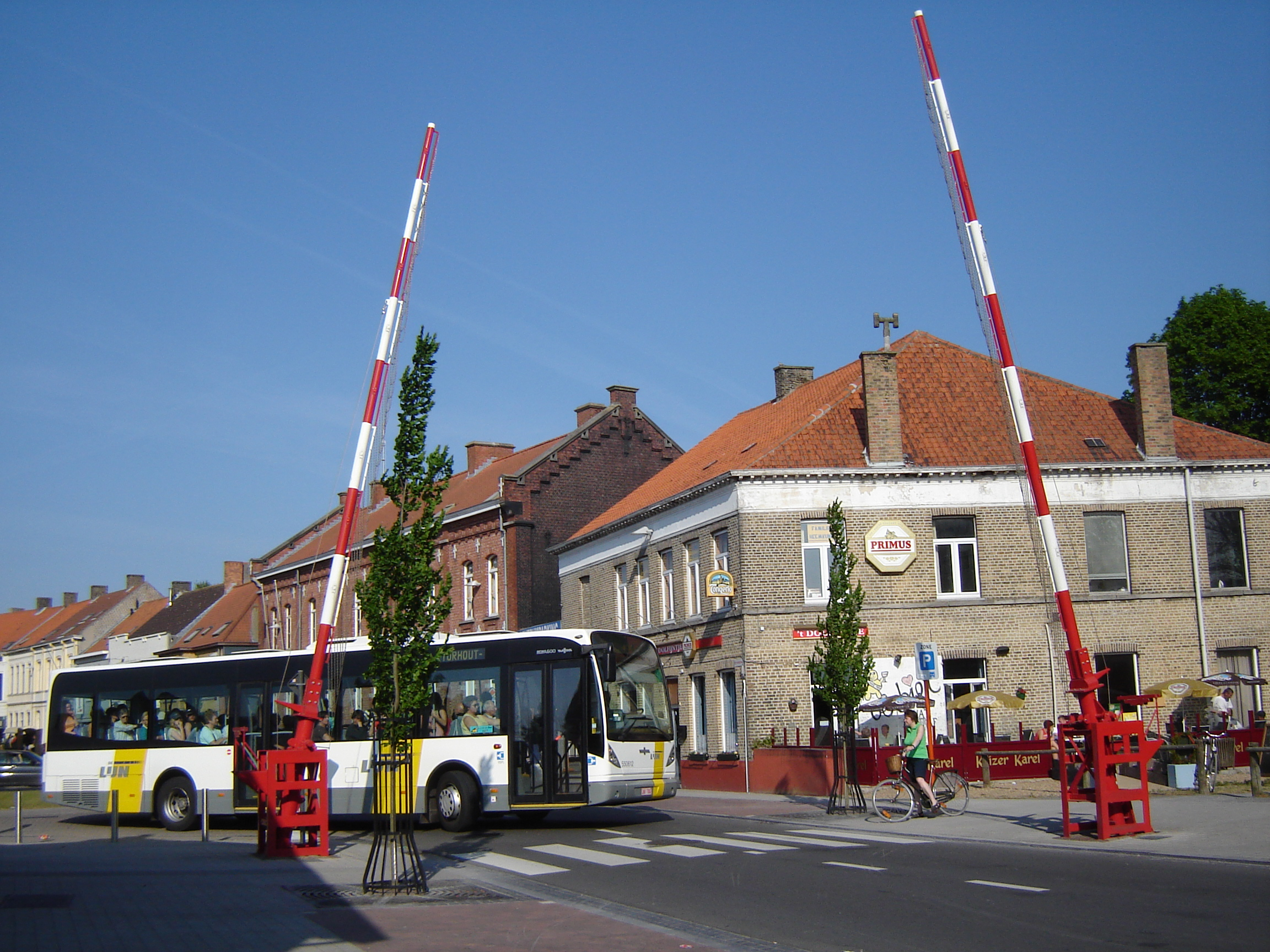

- Flag Coat of arms

- location within arrondissement Ostend and in the province West Flanders
- Interactive map of Gistel
- Location in Belgium
- Coordinates: 51°09′N 02°58′E
- Country: Belgium
- Community: Flemish Community
- Region: Flemish Region
- Province: West Flanders
- Arrondissement: Ostend

Government
  - Mayor: Gauthier Defreyne (VLD)
  - Governing parties: VLD, N-VA, Vooruit

Area
  - Total: 42.84 km^{2} (16.54 sq mi)

Population (2022-01-01)
  - Total: 12,106
  - Density: 282.6/km^{2} (731.9/sq mi)
- Postal codes: 8470
- NIS code: 35005
- Area codes: 059
- Website: www.gistel.be

Gistel (Dutch pronunciation: [ˈɣɪstəl]) is a municipality and city located in the Belgian province of West Flanders.

Following local government boundary reforms in 1971 and 1977, the municipality has comprised not only Gistel, but also the towns of Moere, Snaaskerke and Zevekote.

On January 1, 2006 the Gistel municipality had a total registered population of 11,125, of whom more than 8,000 were in Gistel itself. The total area is 42.25 km² which gives a population density of 263 inhabitants per km². The German town of Büdingen is its twin town.

== Celebrity connections ==
The most famous inhabitant of Gistel was Sylvère Maes, winner of the Tour de France in 1936 and 1939.

Another former resident of Gistel is Johan Museeuw, also famous cyclist, but now retired. He won Paris–Roubaix three times.

In 2011, a museum opened in Gistel, in honor of Maes and Museeuw.

A former mayor, Bart Halewyck, was the first hacker ever convicted in Belgium after the 'Bistel Trial' in 1990. He was already alderman and had to resign after his conviction.

== Images ==
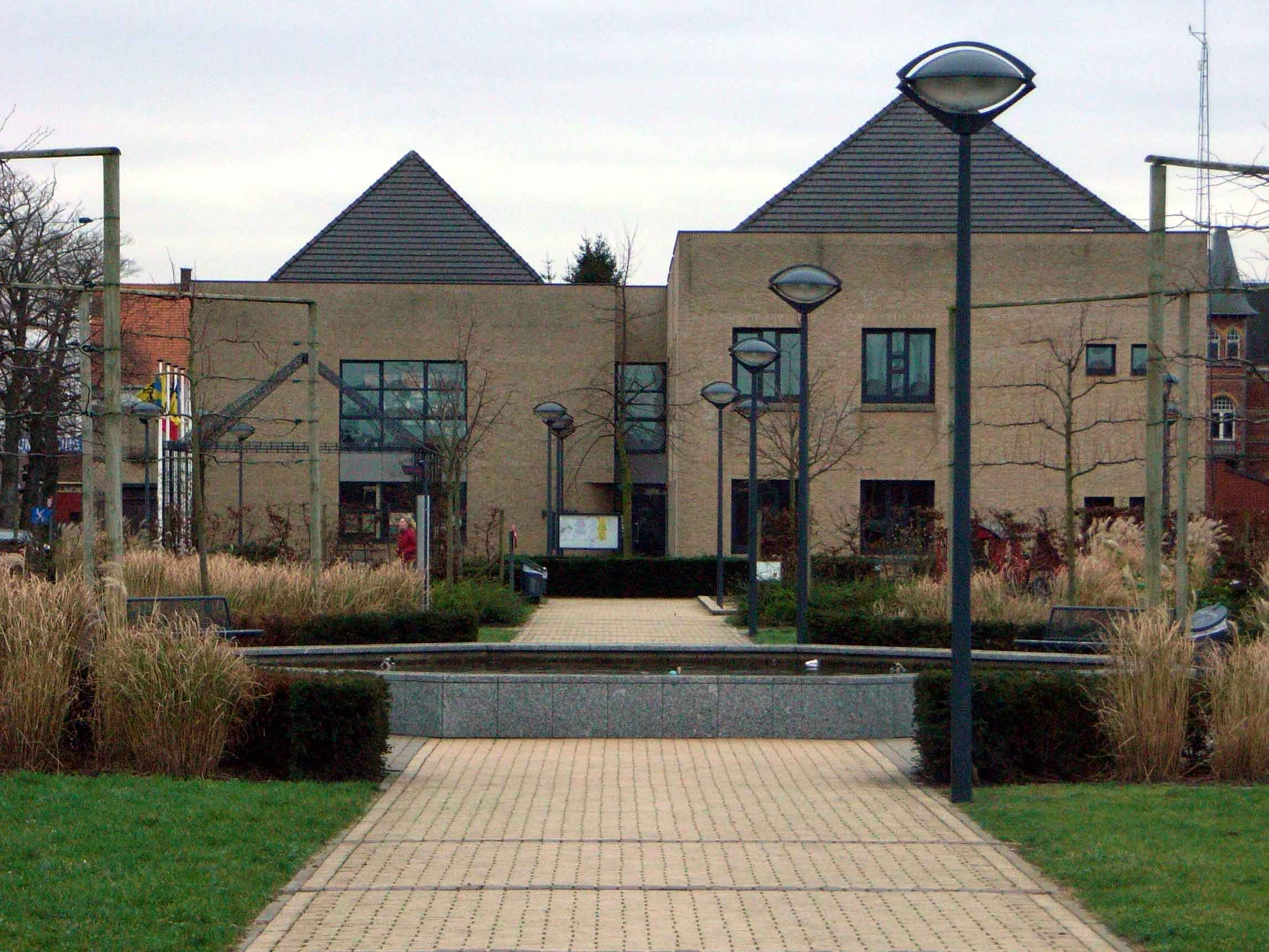
Administration Centre

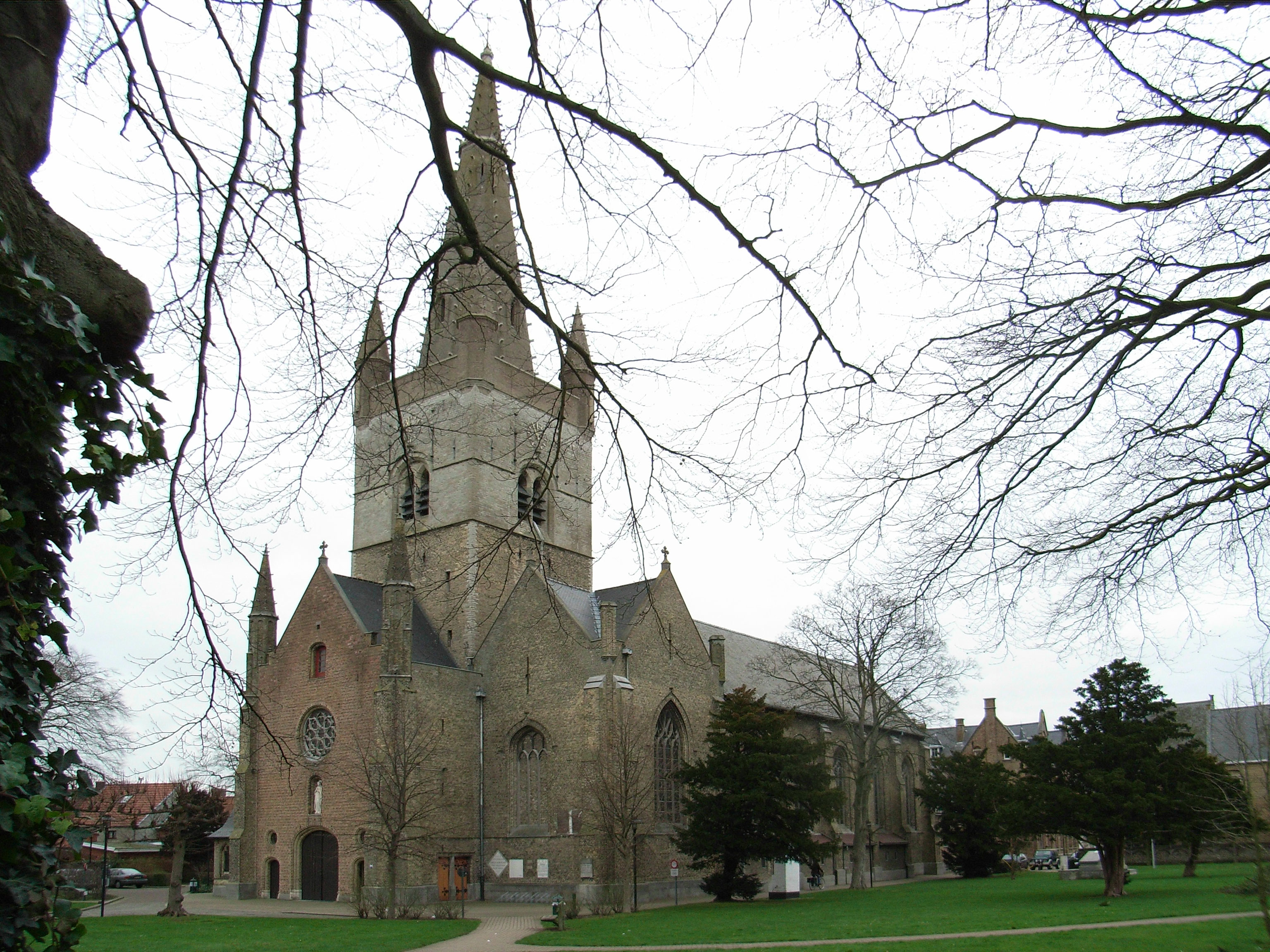
Church of Our Lady (Onze Lieve Vrouw)

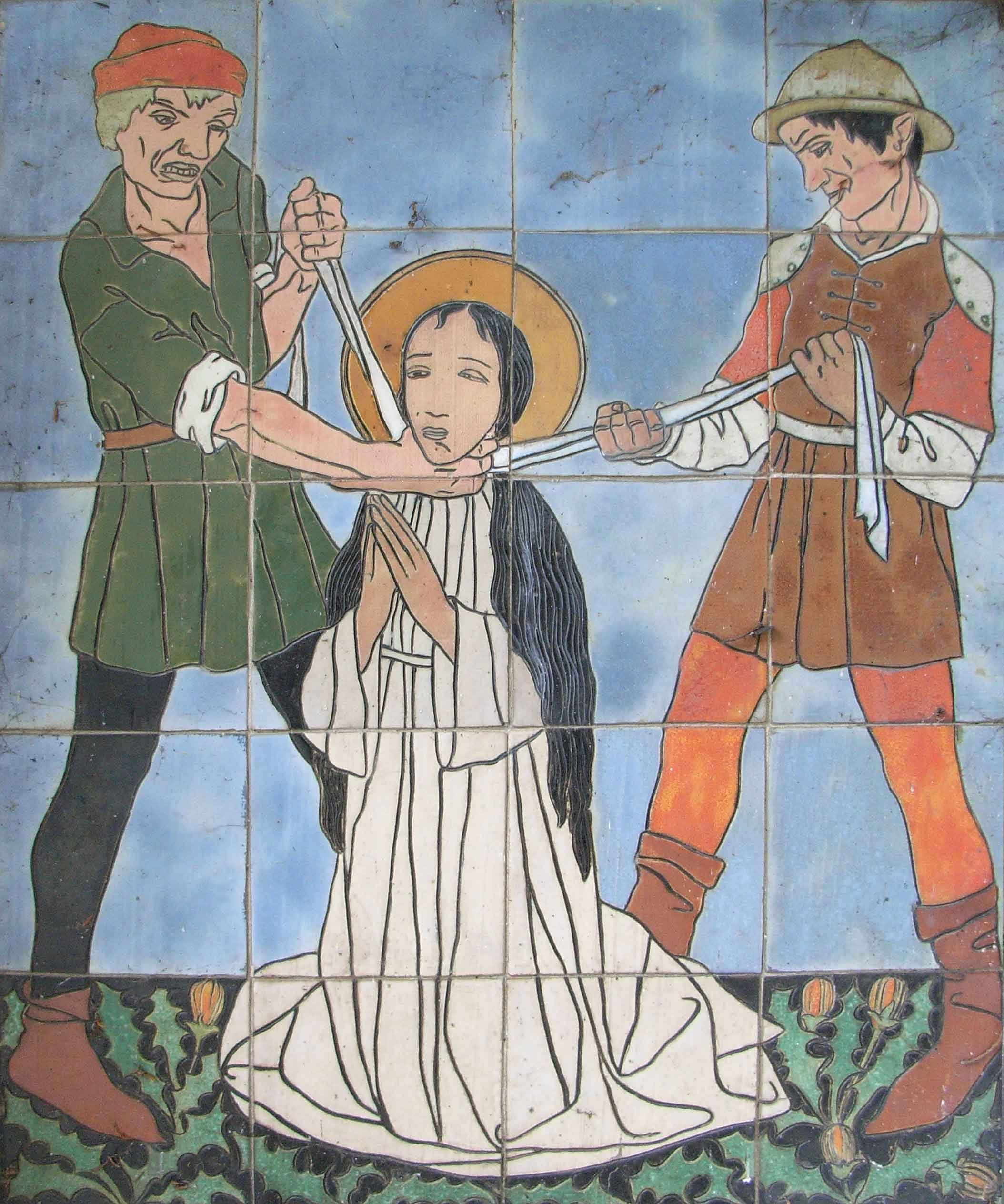
Gistel is the origin of the veneration of Saint Godelieve

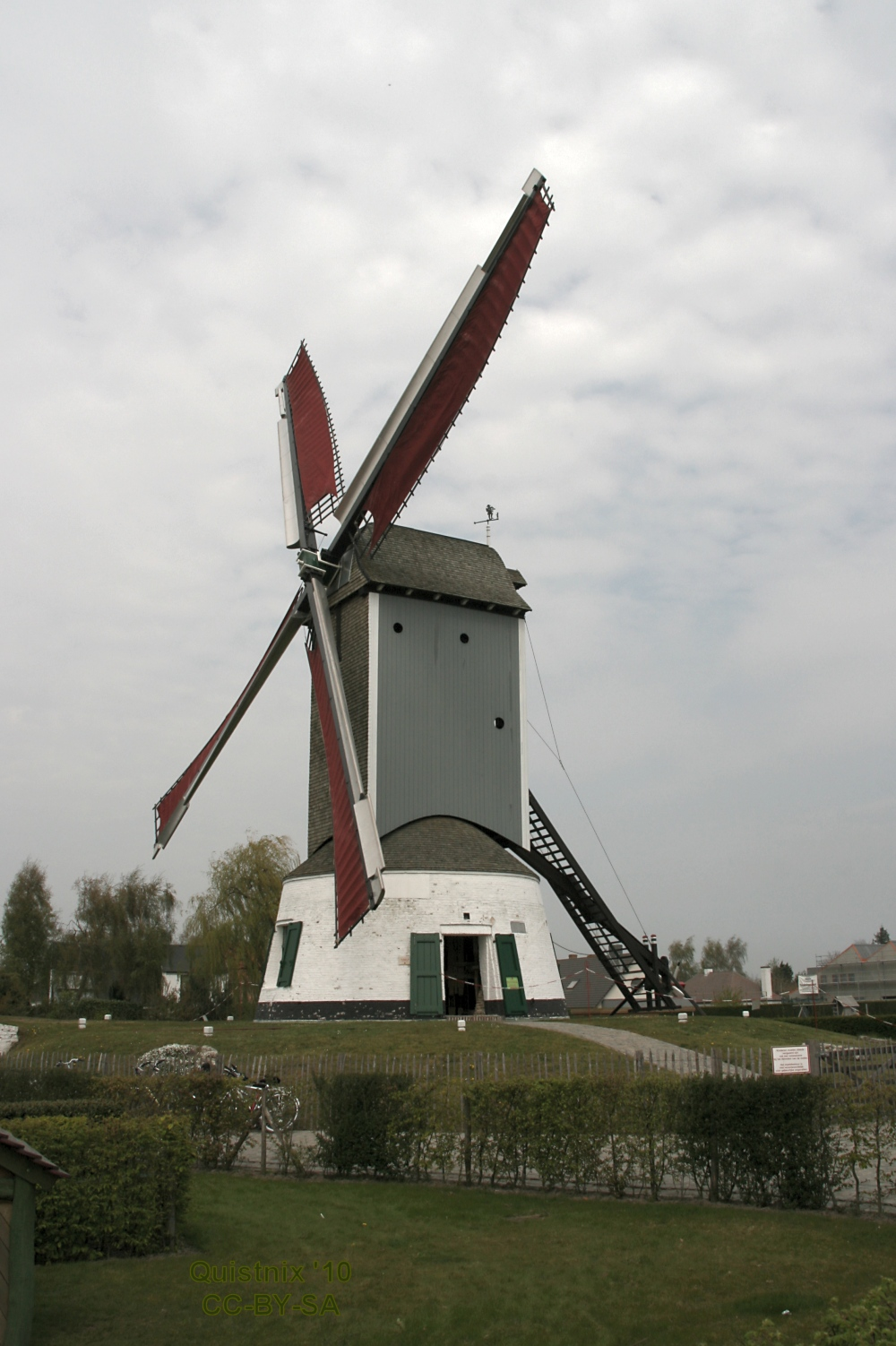
Oostmolen windmill in full sail
