= Abbey of Saint Winnoc =

Abbey in Nord, France

Coordinates: 50°58′05″N 02°26′19″E

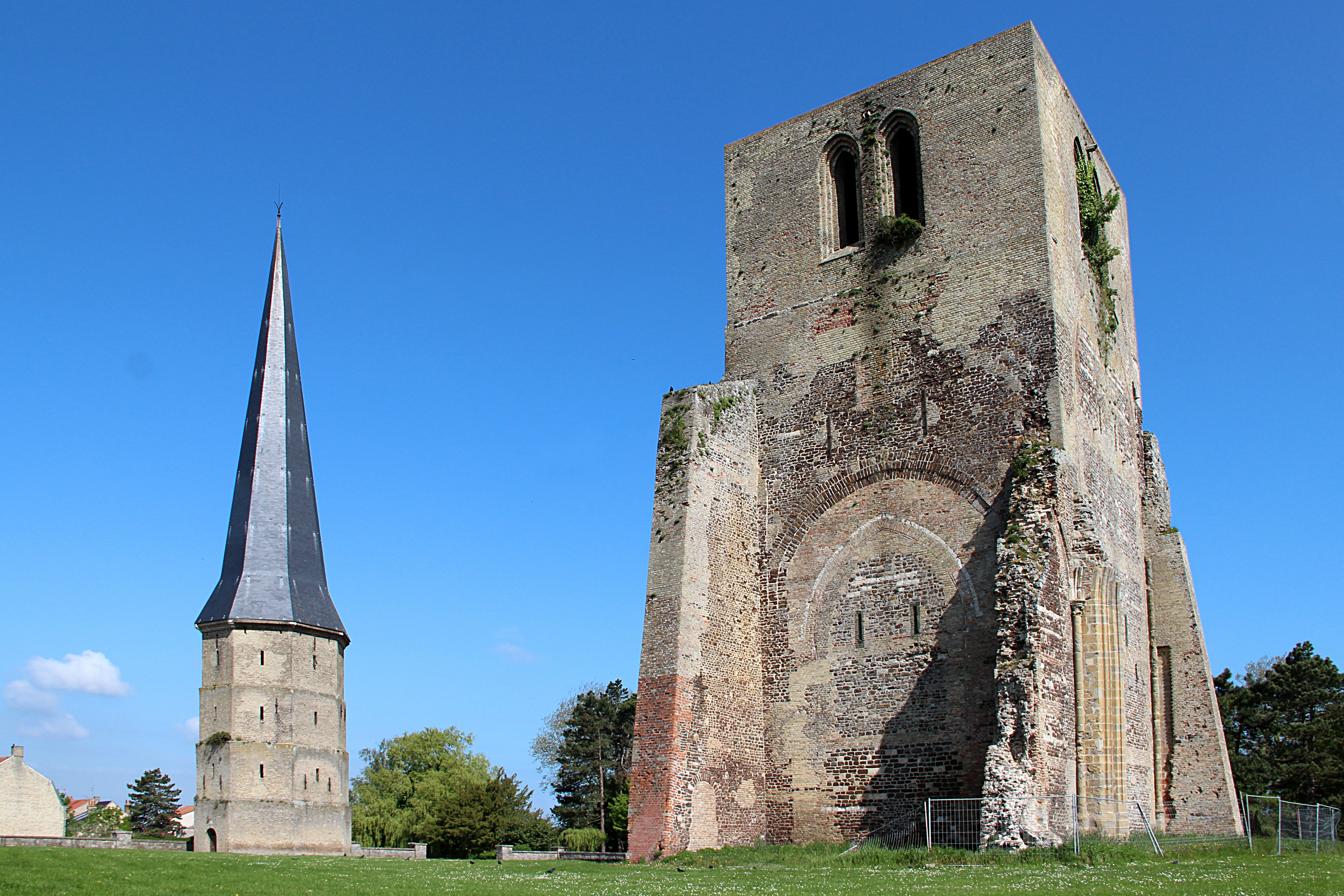
Ruins of the Abbey of Saint Winnoc; the towers were preserved when the abbey was demolished since they served as daymarks for sailors.

The Abbey of Saint Winnoc (French: Abbaye de Saint-Winoc) is a former monastery in Bergues, in the department of Nord in northern France. It traces its origins to the 7th century, and from the early 11th century became a Benedictine abbey and grew in wealth. The monastery was damaged by fire twice, and heavily rebuilt in the 18th century. Following the French Revolution, the abbey was disbanded, sold and most of the buildings dismantled. Only the former gate and two towers remain, as they were used as navigational aids.

== Origins ==
The abbey traces its origins to the late 7th century, when a monastery dedicated to Saint Winnoc was founded by the abbot of the Abbey of Saint Bertin in Wormhout. In 899 Baldwin II, Margrave of Flanders, had the relics of Saint Winnoc moved to Bergues and constructed a new church there. Circa 1020 Baldwin IV, Count of Flanders had yet another church built in Bergues and the relics transported there. It was originally a collegiate church, but in 1022 Count Baldwin expelled the canons and turned the monastery into a Benedictine abbey. Until 1068, the abbot of the monastery was chosen from the ranks of the Abbey of Saint Bertin.

The new abbey was located on an important trade route and close to important commercial centres, and attracted plenty of pilgrims and patrons. It had also been generously bestowed with land and tithes by Count Baldwin, and thus quickly became a rich monastery. From an early date, it began issuing its own coins and received permission to hold a yearly market in Wormhout. The abbey also actively sought to enhance its attractiveness by acquiring the relics of two further saints, Oswald of Northumbria and Lewina, and by producing a written narrative of the reported miracles of Saint Winnoc.

== Later history and dissolution ==
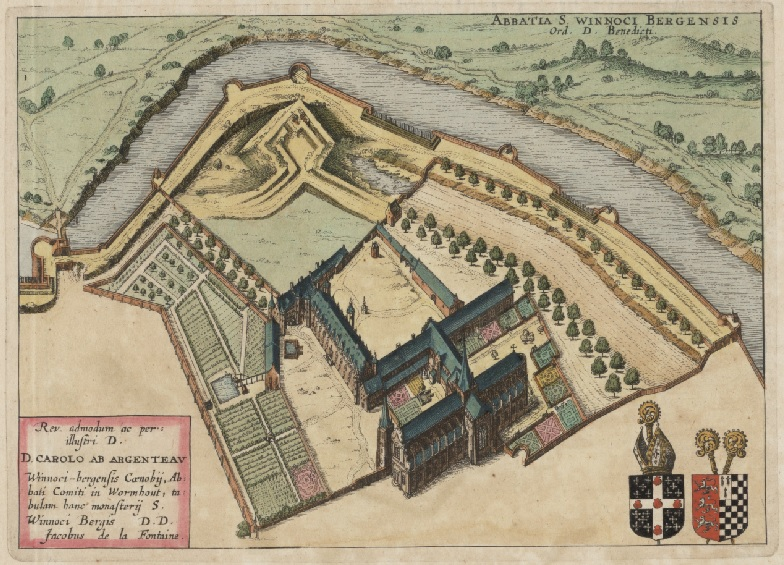
The abbey in the 17th century; illustration by Antoon Sanders in Flandria Illustrata, 1641.

In 1083 the entire abbey was destroyed in a fire, but appears to have been rebuilt by 1133. In that year the new abbey church was consecrated. The choir was substantially enlarged by works which were begun in 1288 and ended during the early 14th century. Another fire damaged the monastery in 1558.

The monastery was largely rebuilt in 1753–1770. The monastery was closed and sold in 1798 following the French Revolution and the ensuing suppression of monasteries. Soon thereafter it was almost entirely dismantled. Only the former gate of the monastery (later moved somewhat) and two towers were preserved, the latter because they served as daymarks, a form of navigational aid for sailors. The western tower collapsed in 1812, and was rebuilt the following year in an octagonal shape.

== Abbots ==
Abbots listed by date of appointment where known.

- 1028 Roderic, monk of Saint Bertin
- 1041 Germain
- 1052 Rumoald, monk of Saint Bertin
- 1068 Ermenger, monk of Saint Winoc
- 1098 Manasses
- 1104 Ingelbert
- 1121 Hermes Walloncappelle
- 1124 Thomas
- 1148 Alfger
- .... Théodoric
- .... Jean I
- .... Acher
- 1170 Walter
- 1178 Alexis
- 1188 Philippe
- 1220 Ingelrame
- .... Willem de Slipe
- .... Jean de Bourbourg
- .... Jean Loys
- .... Gautier de Formezelles
- .... Egide de Boslede
- .... Guillaume de Bapaume
- .... Baudouin de Willèques
- 1290 Pierre Falekin
- .... Nicolas Lay
- .... Guillaume Marant
- .... Jean Bleehart or Vliggaert
- .... Simon Polin or Plotin
- .... Jean Nagelrincq of Ypres
- .... Jean de Bulscamp
- 1331 Jacques Poisson
- .... Jacques Bornincq
- .... Simon Moer
- .... André Colin
- 1383 Jacques Pinchenier
- 1383 Simon de Haringhes
- 1394 Michel Brasseur
- 1420 Georges Moer, the abbey's first mitred abbot
- 1442 Walter Bavelaere
- 1472 Pierre Lotin
- 1488 Jean Maes
- 1490 Jean de Gondebault of Burgundy
- 1498 Adrien de Peene
- 1512 Jacques Wilgiers
- 1517 Jacques De Cortewyle, monk of Vlierbake
- 1524 Roland de Steelandt
- 1527 François Oudegherst
- 1535 Gérard de Haméricourt, monk of Saint Bertin; first bishop of Saint-Omer
- 1544 François d'Avroult
- 1556 Jérôme de Grimberge
- 1576 Jean Le Roy
- 1585 Jean Mofflin
- 1587 Thomas Lardeur
- 1592 Charles d'Argenteau, monk of Saint Winoc
- 1627 Charles d'Argenteau, nephew of previous
- 1660 Maure de Vignacourt
- 1677 Anselme Lamin
- 1678 Benoit Vanderbeke
- 1685 Gérard De Croix
- 1689 Maure d'Hardinne of Bergues
- 1694 Benoit Jansseune of Veurne
- 1709 Gerard Vander Haghe of Dunkirk
- 1722 Guillaume Dubois, French cardinal and statesman
- 1723 Goswin Rickewaert of Bergues
- 1751 Maure Desain of Steenvoorde
- 1780 Benoit Vandeweghe, last abbot of Bergues. In 1789 he presided at the assembly of the clergy of the bailliage of Bailleul to draw up a list of complaints and petitions in preparation for the Estates General of 1789.

== Sources cited ==
- Vanderputten, Steven (2012). "Crises of Cenobitism: Abbatial Leadership and Monastic Competition in Late Eleventh-Century Flanders". The English Historical Review. 127 (525): 259–284. doi:10.1093/ehr/cer409. hdl:1854/LU-1923225. JSTOR 41473996.
