= Bergues =

Bergues (Sint-Winoksbergen)
- Commune
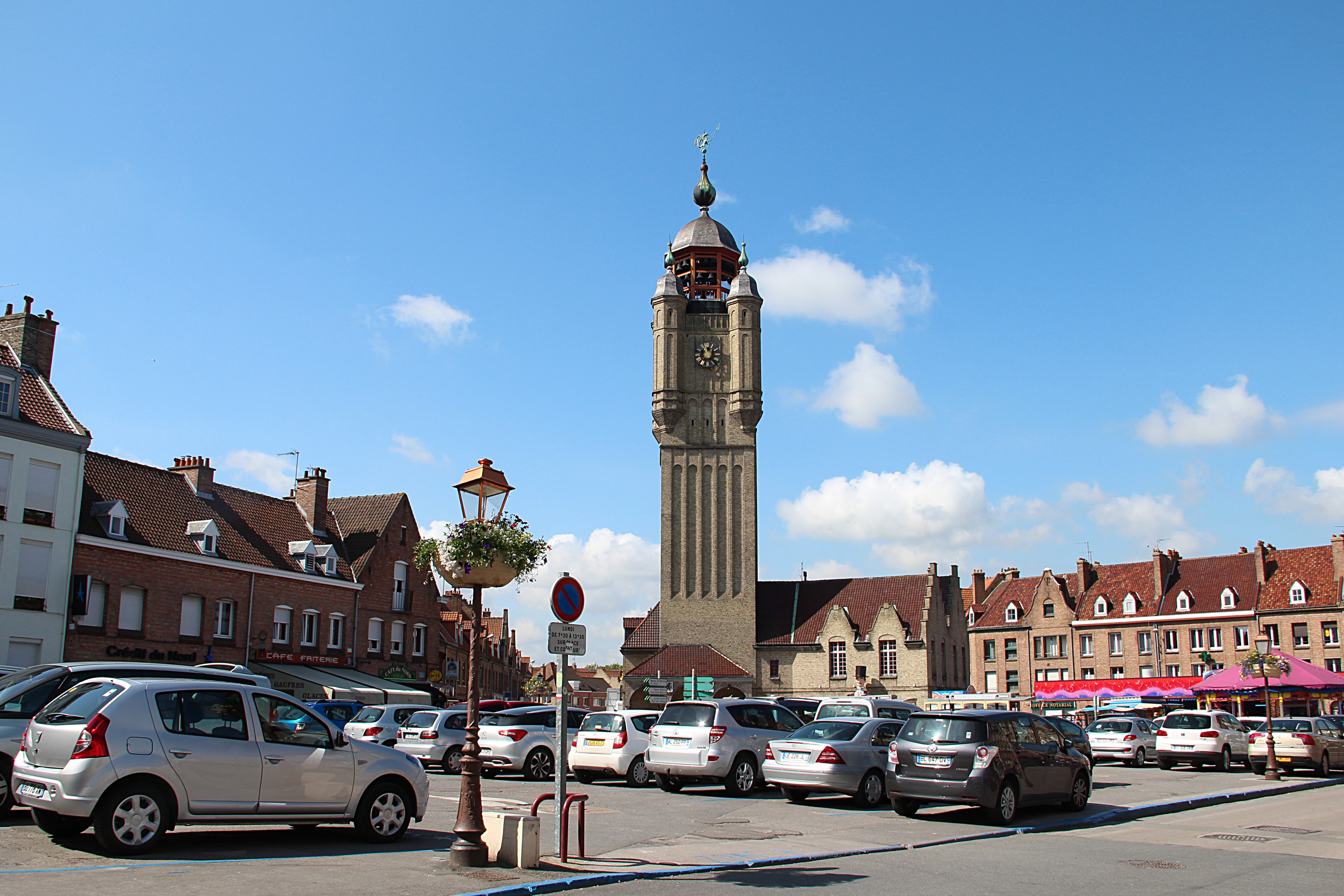
- A street and the belfry of Bergues

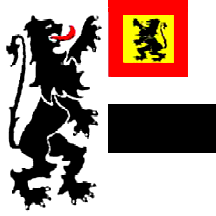
- Flag Coat of arms
- Location of Bergues
- Location within France Location within Hauts-de-France
- Coordinates: 50°58′09″N 2°26′06″E
- Country: France
- Region: Hauts-de-France
- Department: Nord
- Arrondissement: Dunkerque
- Canton: Coudekerque-Branche
- Intercommunality: CC Hauts de Flandre

Government
  - Mayor (2020–2026): Paul-Loup Tronquoy
- Area^{1}: 1.32 km^{2} (0.51 sq mi)
- Highest elevation: 22 m (72 ft)
- Lowest elevation: 1 m (3.3 ft)
- Population (2023): 3,525
  - Density: 2,670/km^{2} (6,920/sq mi)
- Time zone: UTC+01:00 (CET)
  - Summer (DST): UTC+02:00 (CEST)
- INSEE/Postal code: 59067 /59380
- Website: Official website
- ^{1} French Land Register data, which excludes lakes, ponds, glaciers > 1 km^{2} (0.386 sq mi or 247 acres) and river estuaries.

Bergues (French pronunciation: [bɛʁɡ]; Dutch: Sint-Winoksbergen; West Flemish: Bergn) is a commune in the Nord department in northern France.

It is situated 9 kilometres (5.6 mi) to the south of Dunkirk and 15 kilometres (9.3 mi) from the Belgian border. Locally it is referred to as "the other Bruges in Flanders". Bergues is a setting for the 2008 movie Welcome to the Sticks (Original French title: Bienvenue chez les Ch'tis).

The commune is listed as a Village étape.

== History ==
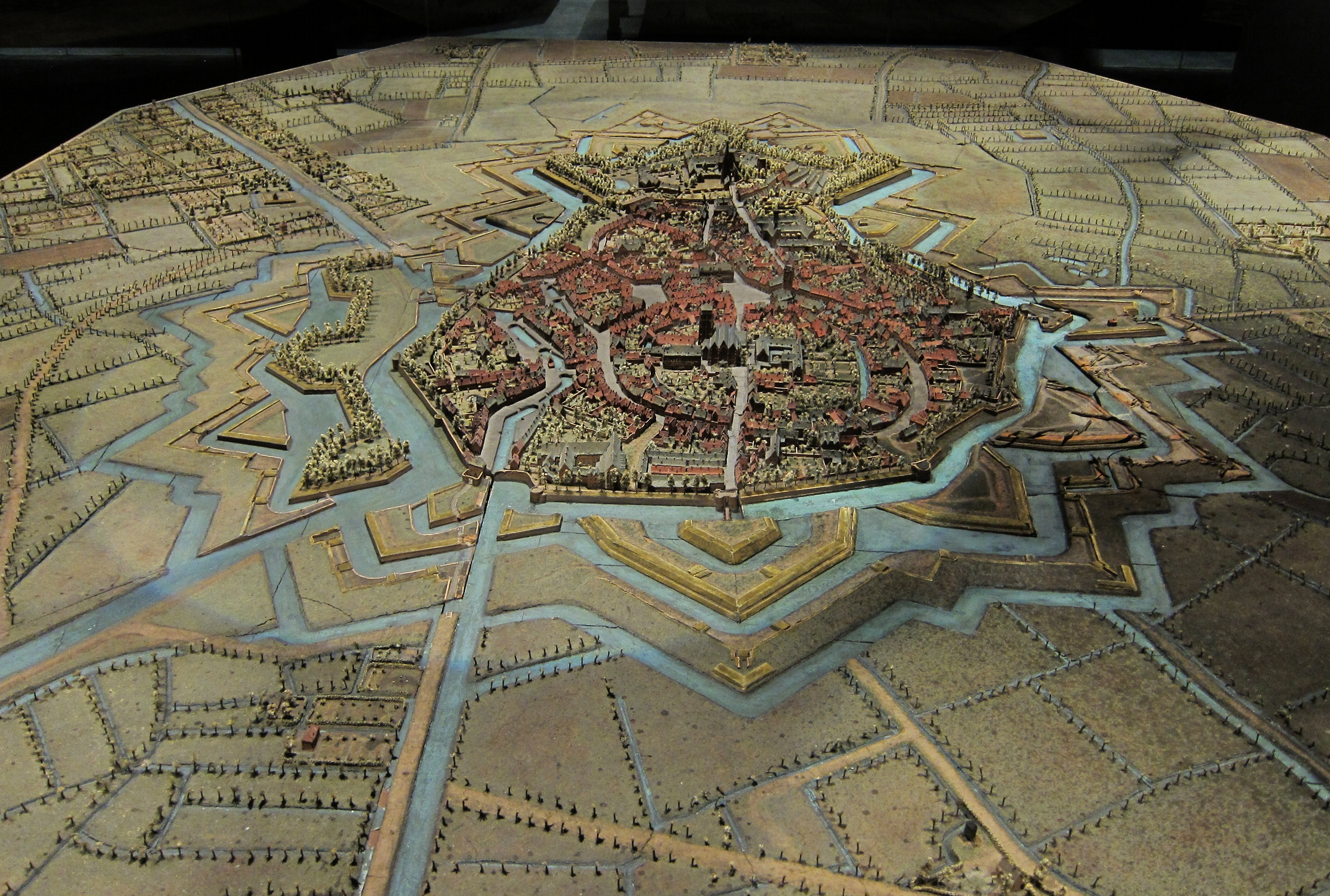
Plan-relief of the citadel of Bergues

The town's name derives from the Dutch groene berg, which means "green hill". According to legend, Saint Winnoc, son of the Breton king, retired to Groenberg, a hill on the edge of the coastal marshes. His establishment soon developed into a small monastery.

In 882, when the Normans began their incursions, the Flanders count Baudouin II built primitive fortifications. Later, in about 1022, Count Baudouin IV built Saint Winnoc Church and interred the relics of St Winnoc there. The church formed the basis of an abbey.

Trade was aided by proximity to the sea, which had not yet receded to Dunkirk, and the abbey. Bergues was chartered in 1240, and its independence was later expressed in the construction of a belfry. It became a port and textile center of regional importance, and part of the Hanseatic League. Its wool market began in 1276 and over the following centuries it was fortified and maintained its independence from France. In 1583, Bergues was besieged and conquered by Alexander Farnese, but king Philip II of Spain allowed it to be rebuilt, establishing the present appearance of the town. Bergues became a major port city and eventually was attached to France by the Treaty of Aix-la-Chapelle in 1668. Louis XIV later developed Dunkirk, and Bergues was eclipsed as a major port. After the French Revolution, its decline continued.

Bergues was devastated by bombardment in World War I, and again in 1940 during the Battle of Dunkirk. The city was entered on 2 June that year, and 80% of it was ruined during World War II.

Near industrialized Dunkirk, its many monuments are reminders of a rich past, and tourism has been developed in recent years.

Bergues was the setting for the 2008 French film Bienvenue chez les Ch'tis. The film, which broke French box office records, is credited with triggering a tourism boom in Bergues.

Possible Roman influence

There is a possibility of Bergues being the Roman Port of 'Marcae' mentioned in the Litus Saxonicum as there appears to be research in the UK that the high sea levels were about 4.5 metres higher in late Roman times than that of today. Bergues appears to be on the Roman Road from Castellum Menapiorum(modern Cassel) a major hill fort, the road appears to stop at about Bergues, which would be on the coast at the time.

Bergues is about halfway between Oudenberg and Boulogne (both Saxon Shore forts) and appears to be land if the sea level is raised 4.5 metres in which case would mean Bergues would have a well protected harbour inland from the town.

== Population ==
Historical population

Year	Pop.	±% p.a.
1793	6,108	—
1821	5,528	−0.36%
1846	5,967	+0.31%
1872	5,774	−0.13%
1901	5,227	−0.34%
1926	3,878	−1.19%
1946	3,237	−0.90%
1962	4,469	+2.04%
1968	4,545	+0.28%

Year	Pop.	±% p.a.
1975	4,485	−0.19%
1982	4,488	+0.01%
1990	4,163	−0.94%
1999	4,209	+0.12%
2007	3,923	−0.88%
2012	3,910	−0.07%
2017	3,653	−1.35%
2023	3,525	−0.59%

Source: EHESS and INSEE (1968-2023)

== Heraldry ==
Arms of Bergues	The arms of Bergues are blazoned : Argent, a lion contourny sable langued gules impaled with Argent, a fess sable, and on a canton Or, a lion sable within a bordure gules.

== Sights ==
- The belfry is the city's most celebrated attraction. Originally constructed in the 13th century, it was rebuilt after the French invasion in 1383 and again in the 16th century, and restored during the 19th century. Damaged by fire in 1940 and destroyed by dynamiting in 1944, it was again rebuilt in 1961. It was classified as a historic building in 2004 and, as one of the Belfries of Belgium and France, a UNESCO World Heritage Site on 16 July 2005. A carillon of 50 bells sounds for the Monday market and other festivities.
- The ramparts, 5,300 metres (17,400 ft) long, are partly medieval and partly constructed by Vauban.
- The Abbey of Saint Winnoc was destroyed in 1789, and only parts remain: the marble gate and two towers.

=== Gallery ===
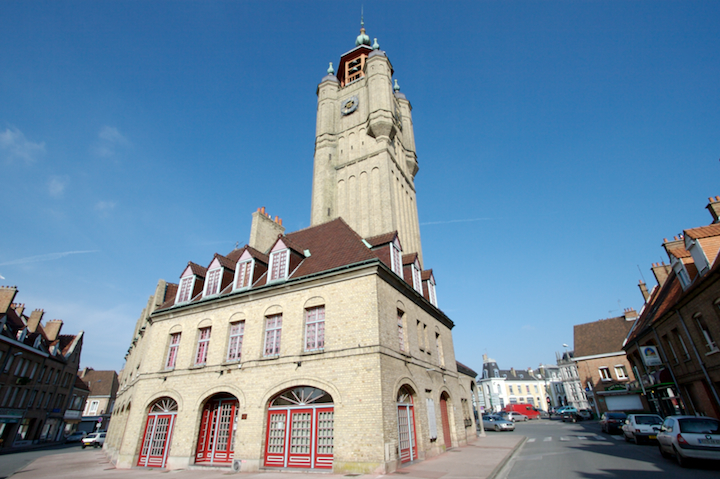
The belfry has a carillon of 50 bells.

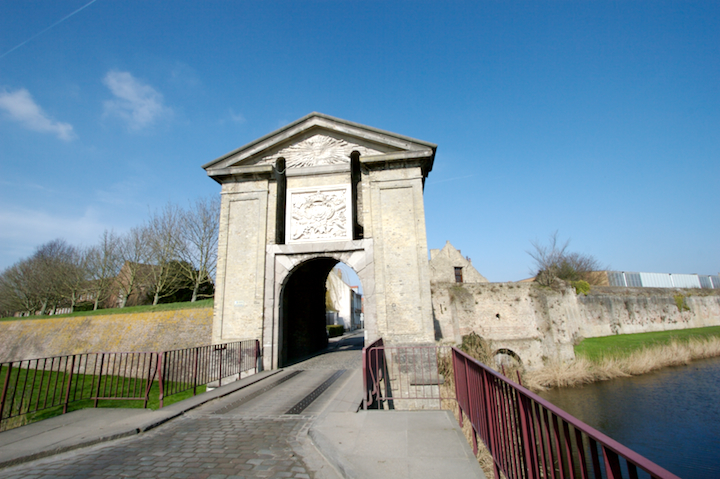
The Gate of Cassel, on a triangular pediment, incorporating the radiating sun of Louis XIV

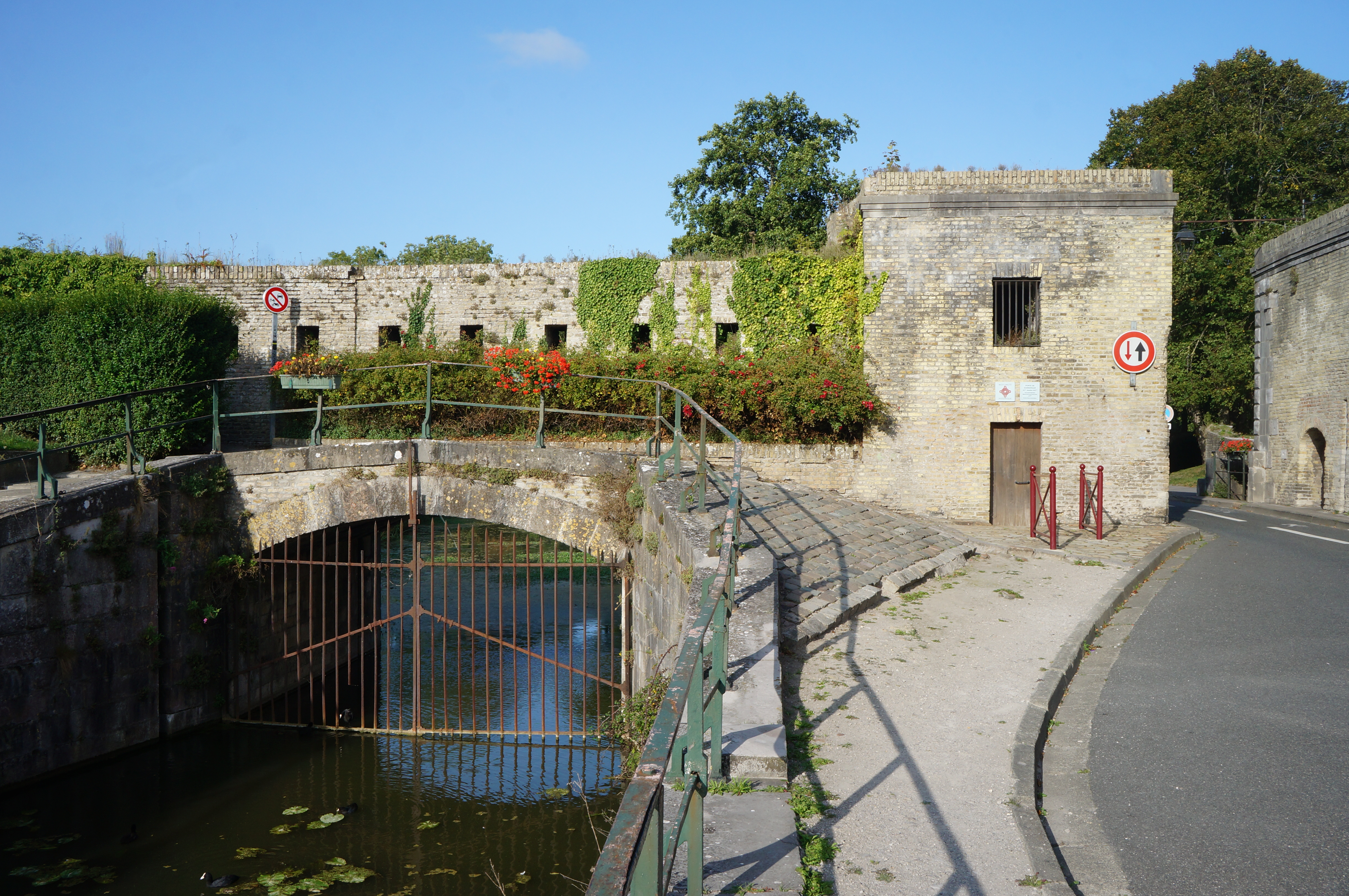
The guardhouse in gate of Dunkerque

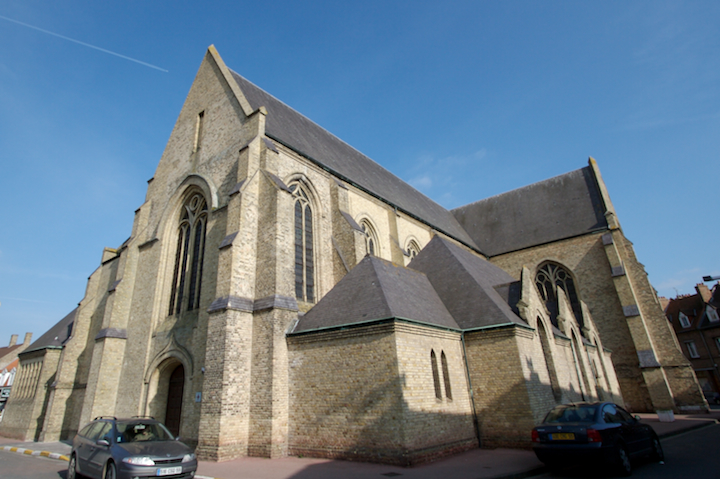
The church of St Martin

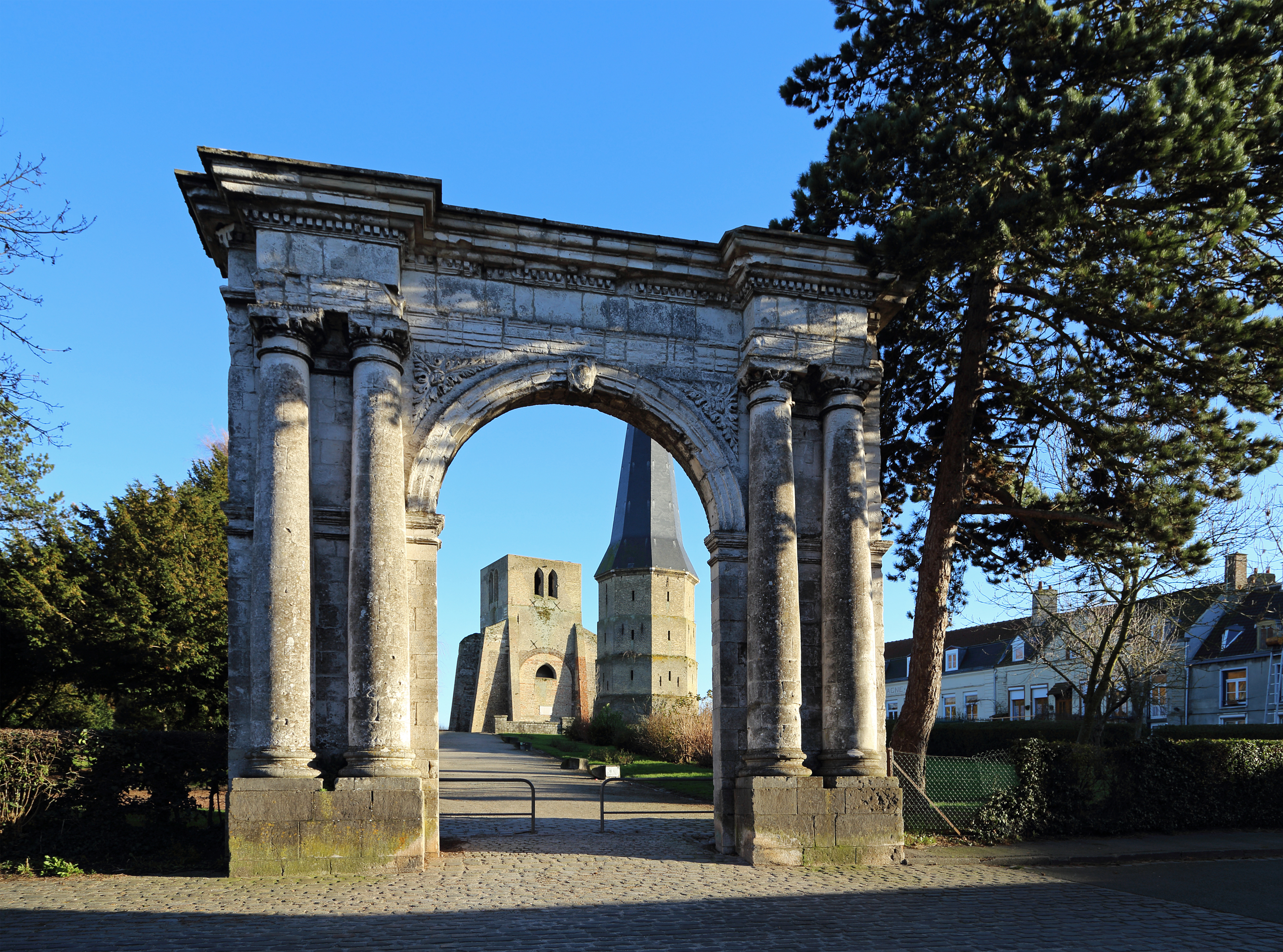
The Marble Gate, main gate of the former Abbey of Saint Winnoc

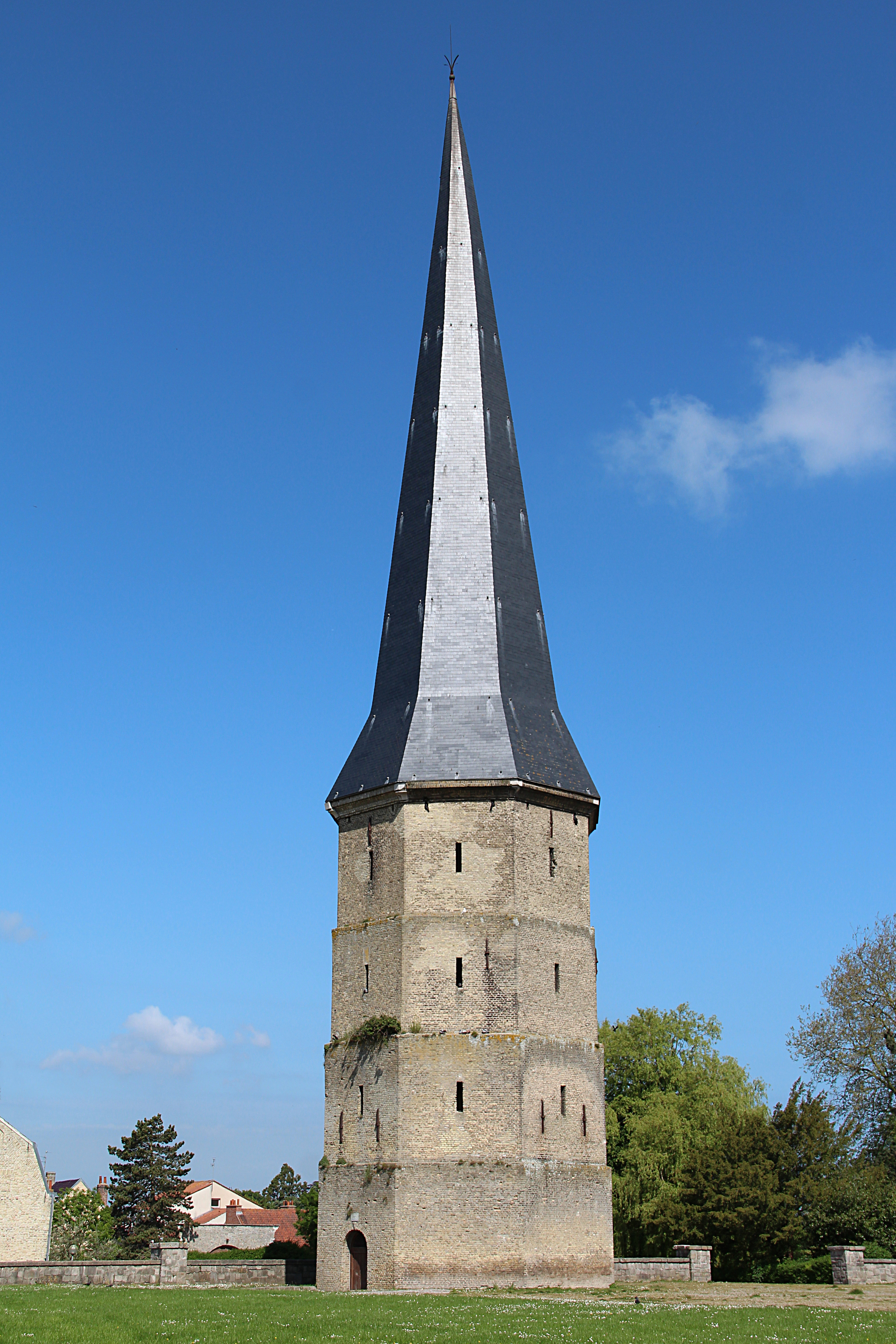
The Tour Pointue of the abbey

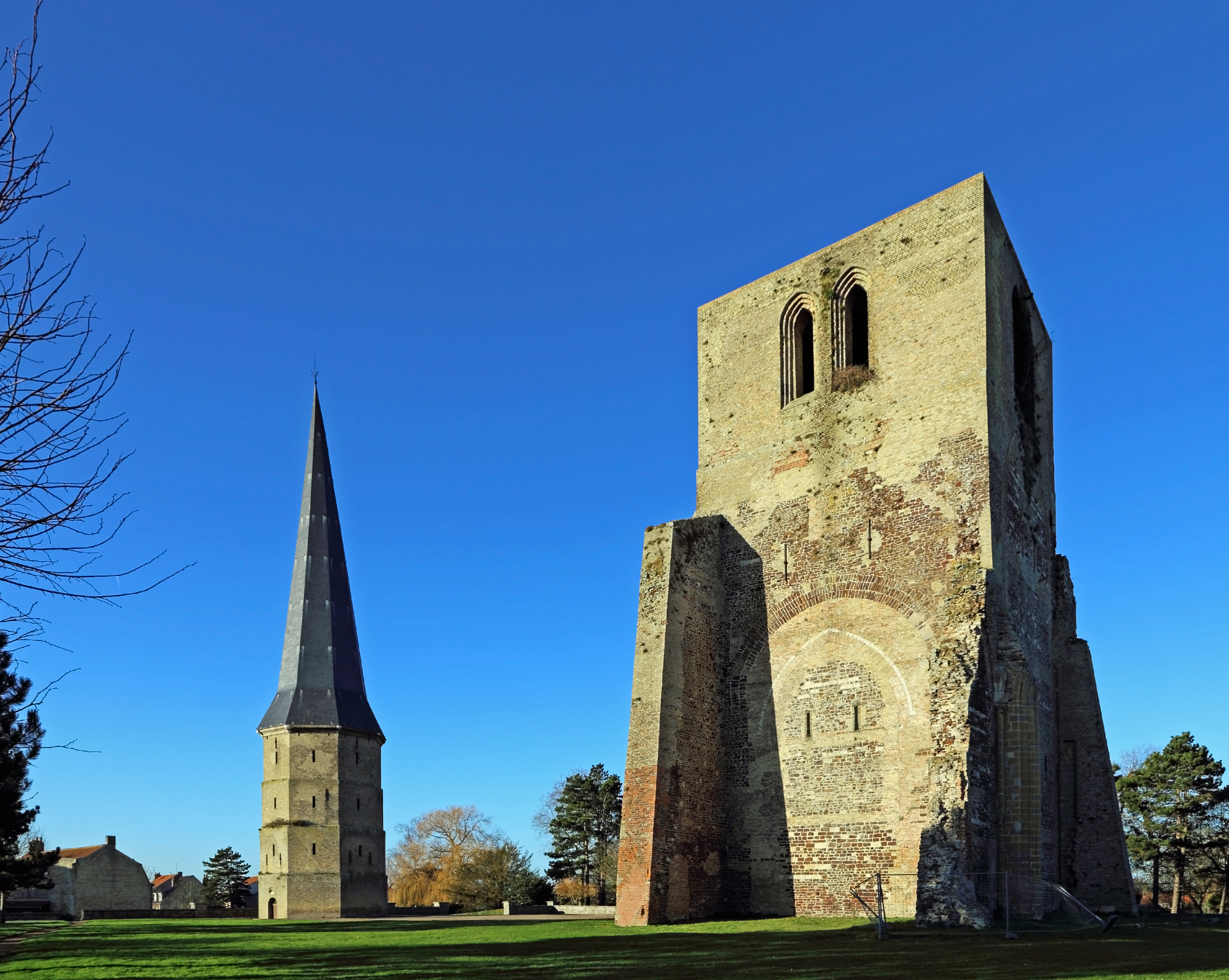
The Tour Pointue and the Tour Carrée of the abbey

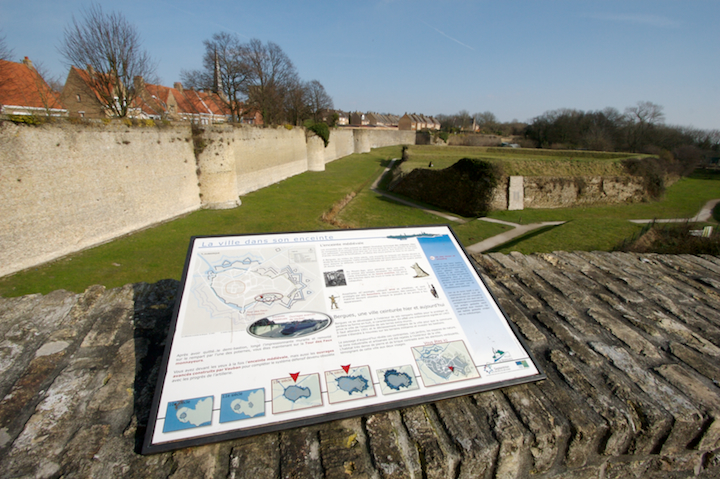
The ramparts, 5300 meters long, have surrounded almost the entire town for five centuries.

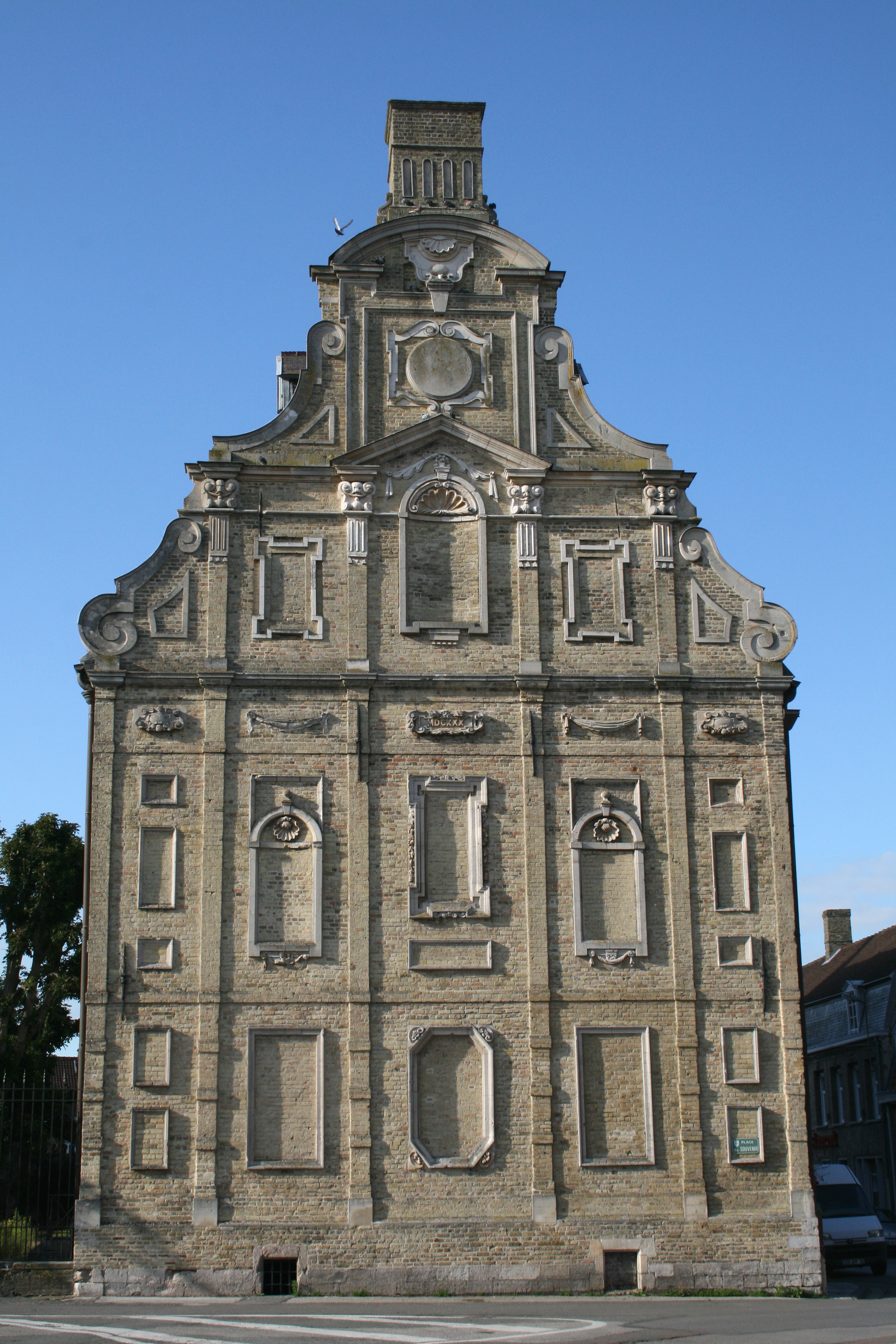
Old mount of piety, now municipal museum in Bergues

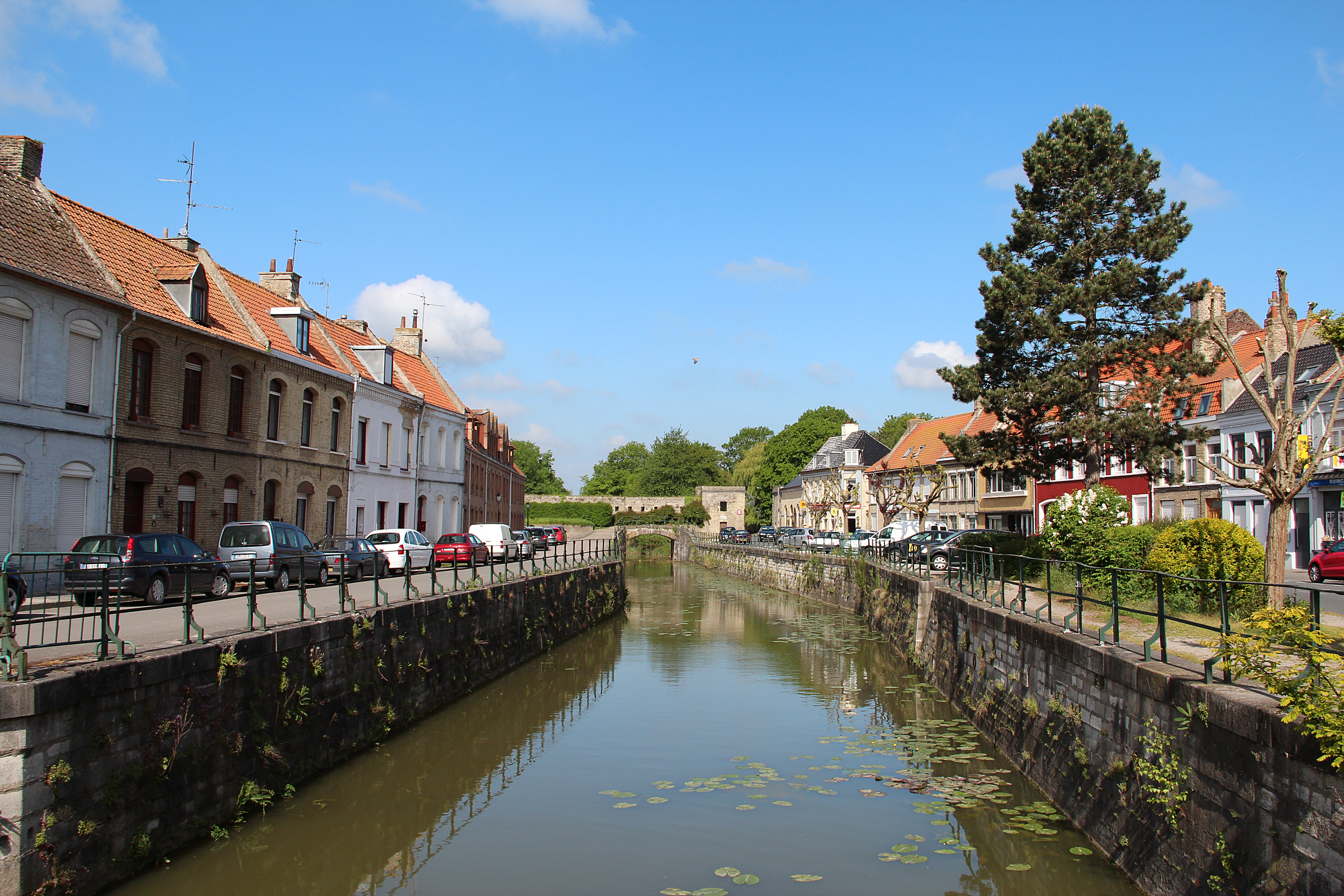
Canal in Bergues

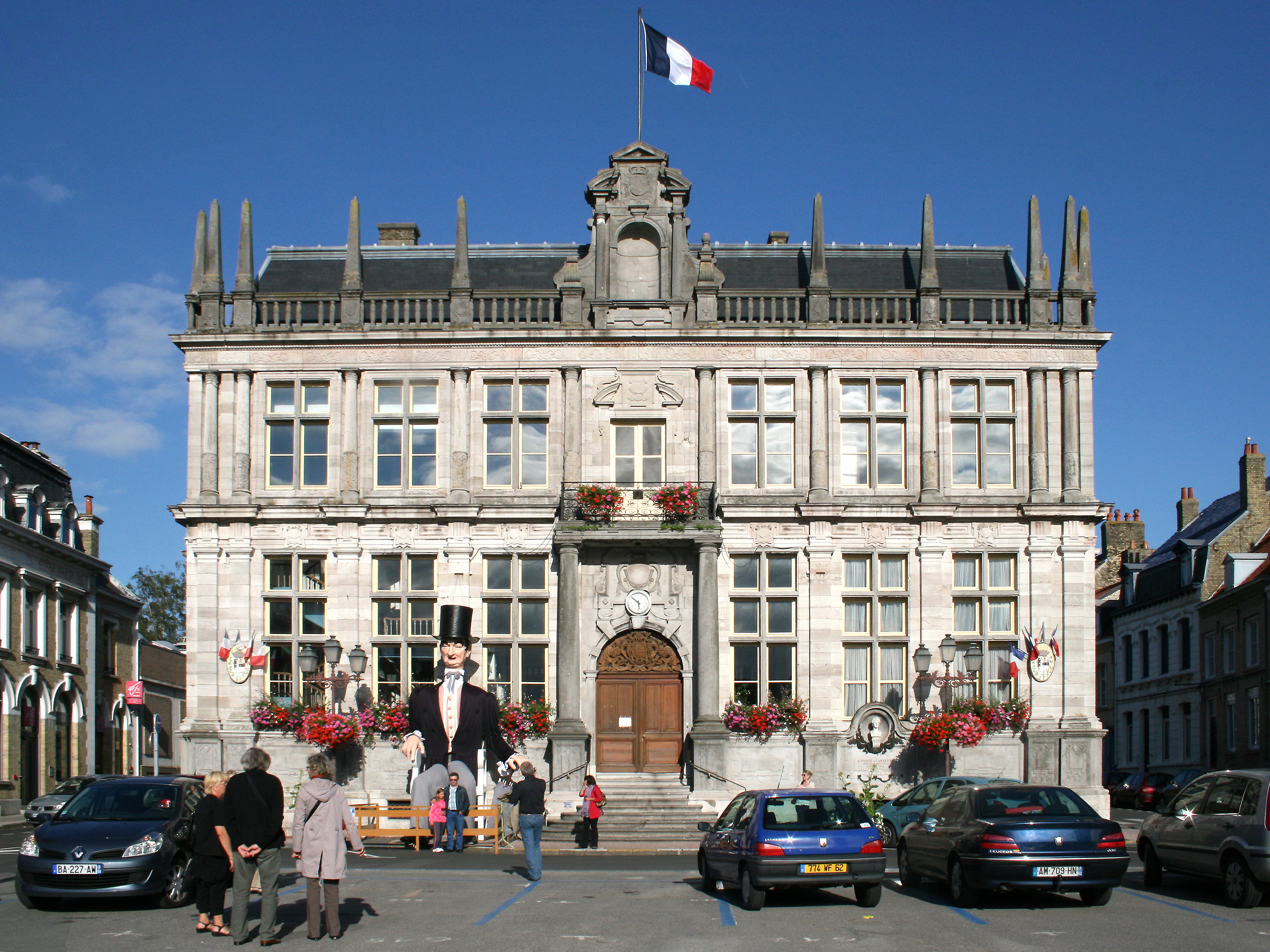
The Town Hall (mairie) in Bergues

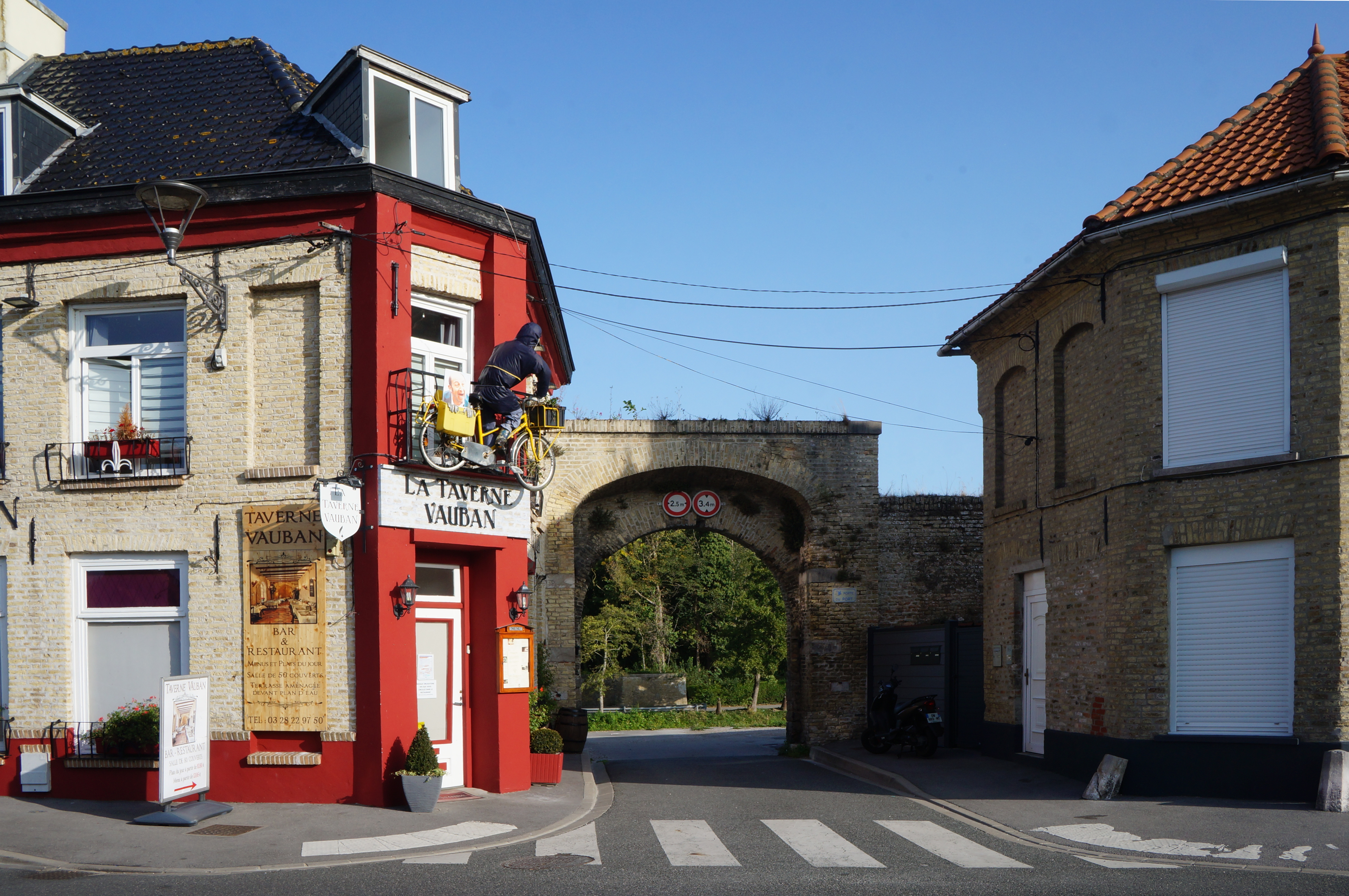
Porte du Port and the Taverne Vauban

== International relations ==
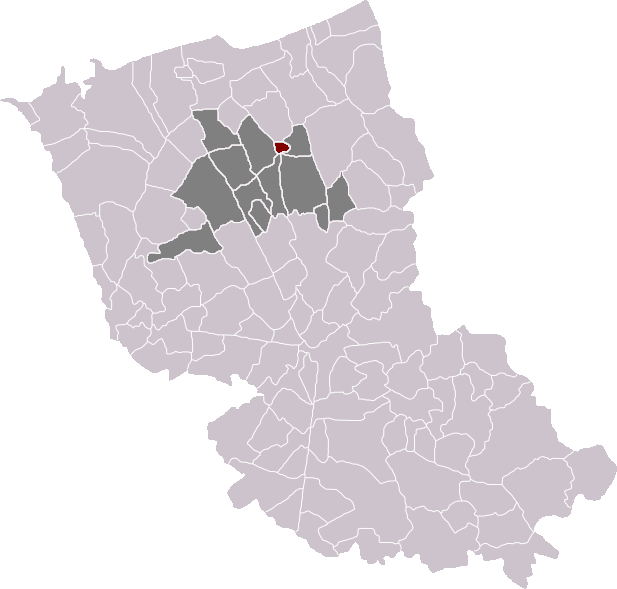
Location of Bergues in the arrondissement of Dunkirk

Twin towns

- Erndtebrück, Germany, since 1973

== Popular culture ==
The movie Bienvenue chez les Ch'tis (by Dany Boon) is set in Bergues.

== See also ==
- Communes of the Nord department
