= Ledringhem =

Ledringhem Ledringem
- Commune
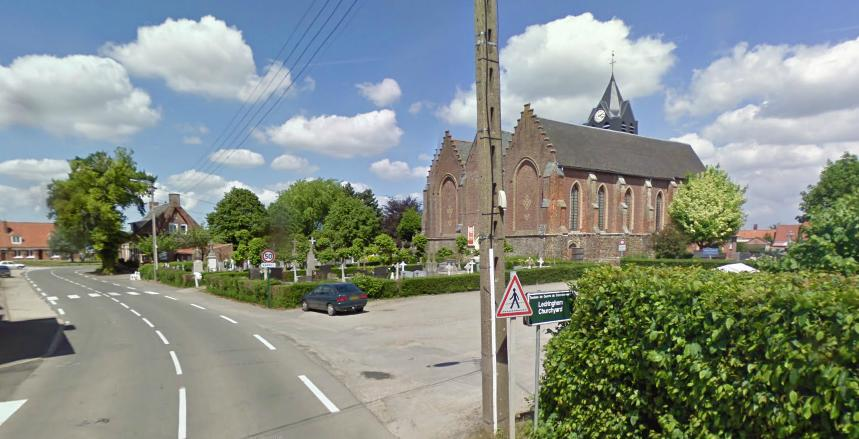
- View of Ledringhem church, graveyard and town hall

- Coat of arms
- Location of Ledringhem
- Location within France Location within Hauts-de-France
- Coordinates: 50°51′19″N 2°26′30″E
- Country: France
- Region: Hauts-de-France
- Department: Nord
- Arrondissement: Dunkerque
- Canton: Wormhout
- Intercommunality: Hauts de Flandre

Government
  - Mayor (2020–2026): Christian Delassus
- Area^{1}: 7.01 km^{2} (2.71 sq mi)
- Elevation: 19 m (62 ft)
- Highest elevation: 26 m (85 ft)
- Lowest elevation: 11 m (36 ft)
- Population (2023): 611
  - Density: 87.2/km^{2} (226/sq mi)
- Time zone: UTC+01:00 (CET)
  - Summer (DST): UTC+02:00 (CEST)
- INSEE/Postal code: 59338 /59470
- ^{1} French Land Register data, which excludes lakes, ponds, glaciers > 1 km^{2} (0.386 sq mi or 247 acres) and river estuaries.

Ledringhem (French pronunciation: [lədʁɛ̃ɡɛm]; West Flemish: Ledringem) is a commune in the Nord department in northern France.

It is situated also in the ancient territory of the County of Flanders, in the Houtland (or woodland, with the cities of Cassel and Hazebrouck) in the Franse Westhoek (French Western corner) where French Flemish was still spoken until recently.

The residents of Ledringhem are called in French Ledringhemois.

== Geography ==
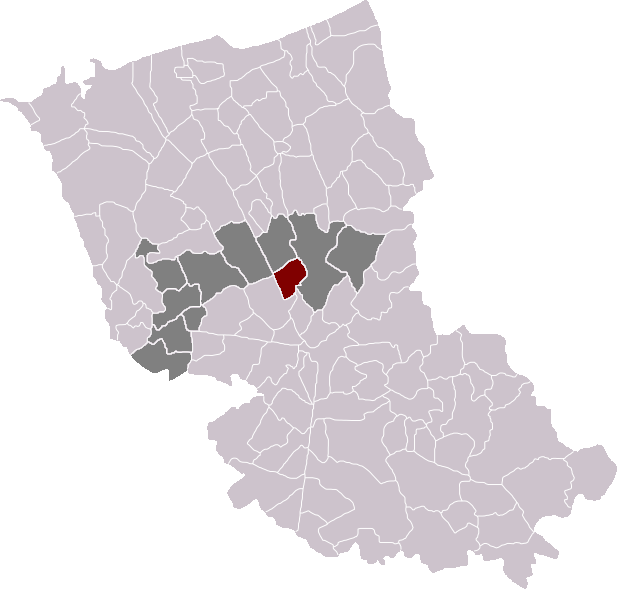
Ledringhem in the arrondissement of Dunkirk

The village is about 4 kilometres (2.5 mi) southwest of the small town of Wormhout, and approximately 10 kilometres (6.2 mi) north of Cassel. Bigger cities are Dunkirk further to the north and Hazebrouck further to the south.

Ledringhem is crossed by the small river Peene Becque, a tributary of the Franco-Belgian river Yser and there is one shorter tributary, the Lyncke Becque, passing closer to the village center. Other small rivers are Trommels Becque, Putte Becque, Platse Becque and Kaliszewski Becque.

The climate in Ledringhem is oceanic with a mild summer (Köppen Classification : Cfb).

== Village limits ==
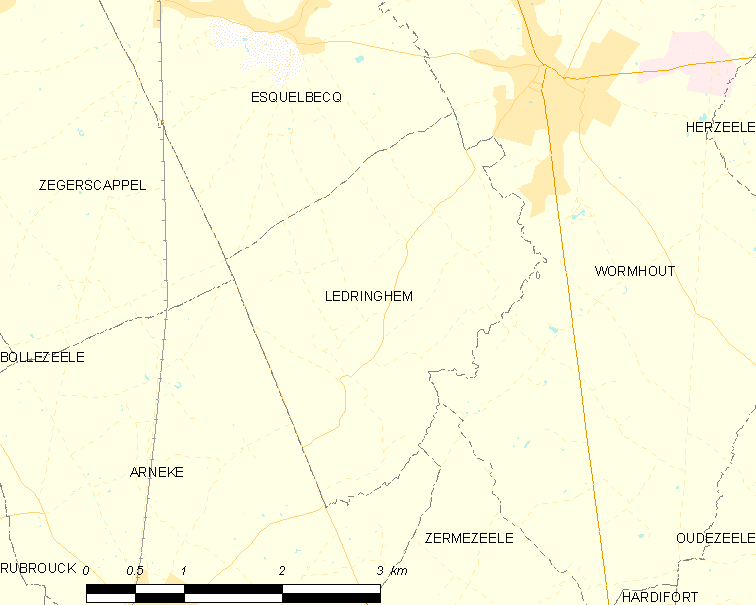
Map

The river Peene Becque constitutes the southern border between Ledringhem and Arnèke and Zermezeele. It is also the South-Eastern limit with Wormhout until the limit crosses a field between rue des postes and rue de la Forgé. The North-Eastern limit with Wormhout is rue Louis Patoor. The village Western limit with Arnèke is Voie romaine (D52). The Northern limit with Esquelbecq is chemin de Rubrouck.

== Place-names ==
The village center consists of the main square (La Place), the church, the cemetery, the town's hall and the village park, forming an islet nested in a large turn of the route de Wormhout.

There are two subdivisions:

- La campagnarde is a more modern part of the village in comparison with the rest of the built patrimony, situated in the west.
- Another modern neighborhood dating 2005 is situated at the former place of the village windmill, destroyed during World War II, at the east. The newly built road serving this neighborhood is called route du moulin (wind mill road).

Other locations (Lieux-dits) are called Bas de la Plaine, La Belette, La Butte, La Motte, La Plaine, La Potence, Le Baron, Les Grenouilles, Les Tambours, Oost Houck (coin de l'Est), Planckeel (Planckael), Sainte Anne, Tampon court and Zinkepit.

Ledringhem is situated on the D55 road (actually called route de Wormhout towards Wormhout in the North-East direction and route d'Arnèke in the West direction).
Other smaller roads include rue Henri Wallaert, chemin d'Esquelbecq, petit chemin d'Esquelbecq (north directions), chemin de Bodeye, chemin de la chapelle, chemin de la pâture grasse, chemin de Steenvoorde, chemin des postes, chemin des prairies, chemin d'Heenhout, chemin du moulin, chemin du tétard borne and voie nouvelle.
The village is a little off the ancient Roman road, now D52, roughly North-South in direction.

== Heraldry ==
Arms of Ledringhem	The arms of Ledringhem are blazoned : Gules, a chevron ermine between 3 pierced mullets of six argent.

== Toponymy ==
=== First appearances in texts ===
- The place-name is first mentioned Leodringas in 723 : "Leodringas mansiones infra Mempisco" in the Latin cartulary of St Bertin's whose first part is credited to St Folquin. This text relates a sale act written in 723 where the names given are Leodringas mansiones or Leodringae mansiones. It is thought that Leodringas is a Latin form of Ledring while mansiones were official stopping places on a Roman road and Mempisco refers to the Pagus Mempiscus, an administrative subdivision in the territory of the Flanders at the time. In this sale act, the owner, who is described as having a considerable wealth, was named Rigobert, whereas the buyer was Erkembode, Sitdiu's (Saint-Omer) abbot.
- Ledreghem in 1080, according to Blomme (Monographie, 1895, page 159), (Note: Edmond-Louis Blomme, 1895. Monograph of Ledringhem (Monographie de la commune de Ledringhem. par M. Blomme, présentée au concours de la Société Dunkerquoise en 1895 (read online (French) on Gallica).) citing the text L'autel de Ledreghem est donné au monastère de Watten par Richard, chanoine de Thérouane vers 1080. from Mémoire des Antiquaires de la Morinie, t. V, page 75, Alexandre Hermand, citing the chronicle of Ébrard de Watten, la Notice sur Watten,
- Ledringehem ar. 1090
- Lidringhere in 1207 (in Innocentius III's Regesta sive epistolae 2, LIBER DECIMUS. XII saecolo, part CXCII, dated 1207). The text states in Latin that two-thirds of the tithes of the village (Lidringhere), with its lordship, lands, and other appurtenances are to be paid to Margarita, abbess of the monastery of Saint Mary of the abbey Sainte-Colombe of Blendecques,
- Ledringhien in 1330 (manuscrit de la bataille de Cassel) The manuscript lists the names of those who died in the Battle of Cassel in 1328 with their belongings. Five names are listed for Ledringhien (Wautiers li Weert, Jehan der Kindre, Michieus der Kindre, Wyl de Vernorsene and Michieus Rase, all possessing a few units of land),

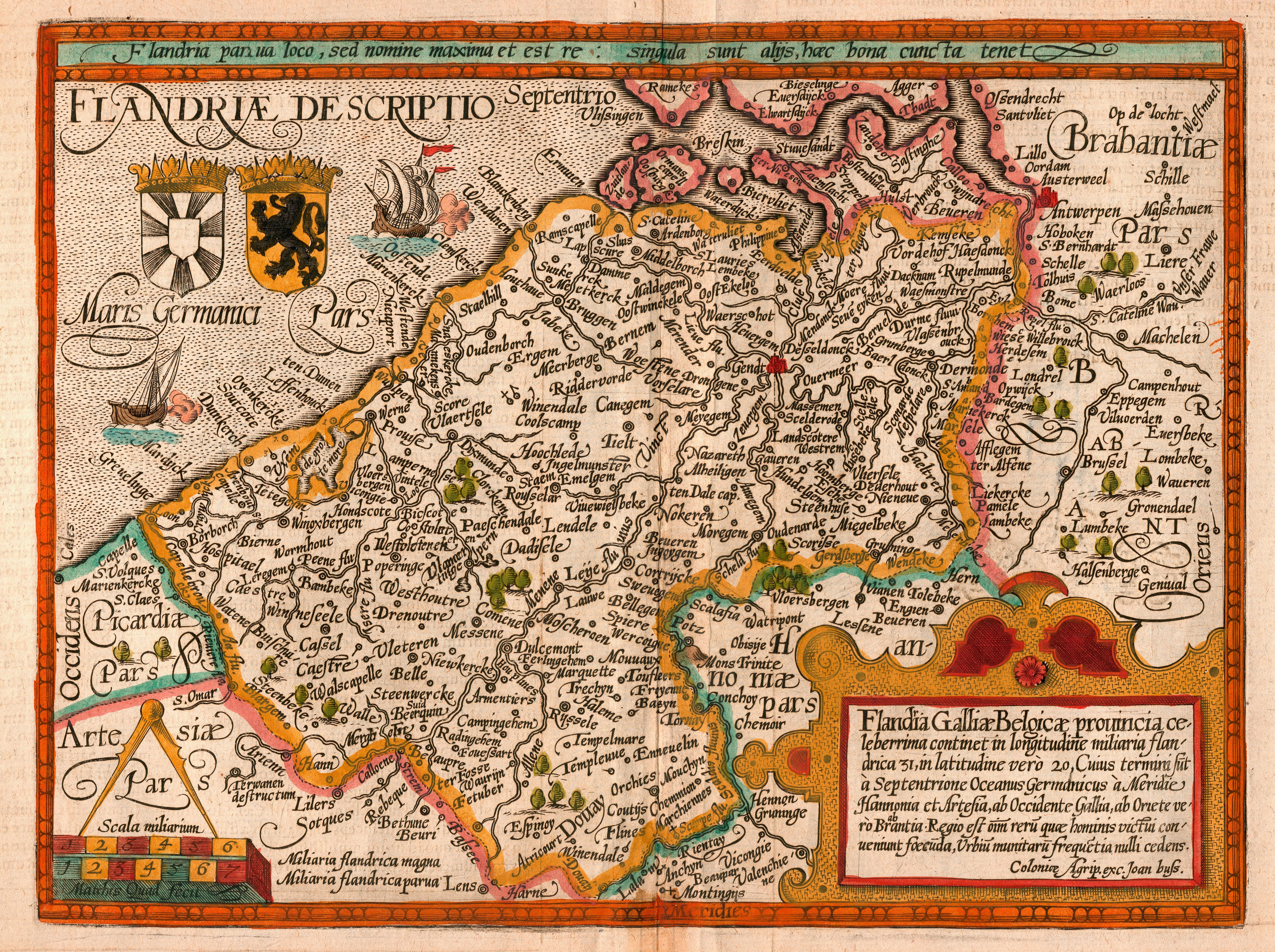
1609 map of the county of Flanders by Matthias Quad (cartographer) and Johannes Bussemacher (engraver & publisher, Cologne)

- Leregem in 1609 (Matthias Quad's map Flandriae Descriptio)
- Leodredingas in 1614–1616 by Ferry de Locre (Ferreolus Locrius) in p. 86 of his Chronicum belgicum (Chronicon belgicum, ab anno CCLVIII ad annum usque M.D.C. continuo perductum.) Atrecht (Arras), a work published posthumously by his father Philippus Locrius
- Leodedringas in 1639, according to Edmond-Louis Blomme, who was school teacher in Ledringhem and who wrote a monograph about the village (Monographie, 1895, page 159), citing the map of the year 800 in Jacques Malbrancq's De Morinis et Morinorum rebus, sylvis, paludibus, oppidis, regia comitum prosapia ac territoriis, Tomus Primus, ab anno ante Christum 309 ad annum eiusdem 751, Tornaci Nerviorum, 1639
- Leregem in 1645 (Joan Blaeu's map Artesia Comitatus Artois)
- Ledrenghem in 1757 (14th sheet of Cassini's map, the village is pictured as a parish with a wooden wind mill)

=== Etymology ===
An ancient and legendary explanation is that the name comes from the Latin form (Ledera) of the name of a local brook called the Leder. This explanation, given in tome II, page 572 of Flandria Illustrata (1641), and though doubtful, is also provided for the name of nearby village Lederzeele. It comes from Sanderus (1586–1664) who wrote, citing Malbrancq: Lederam pluribus ab ortu suo pagis nomem communicantem (The Leder was the source of many country names).

In reality, the place-name Ledringhem is typical Germanic, with the common Germanic double end -ing-hem (name suffix + toponymic appellative) found everywhere in Flanders, corresponding exactly to the English one -ing-ham (e. g. Nottingham). This -ing-hem turned into -egem where Flemish-Dutch continued to be spoken, but remained the same -ing-hem where the Picard language replaced the Flemish one in the Middle Ages. The French language has retained the old version, and often frenchified it as -eng-hien or -ing-hien (see above Ledringhien in 1330, similar to Enghien for instance) but the existence of the evoluted Dutch form is attested : Ledregem in the 17th century.

The only problem that divides the specialists (the "toponymists") is the right identification of the personal name (male's name) contained in this place-name.

The current name Ledringhem could be of Frankish origin, with the -hem particle meaning "home" and Ledring- being the genitive form of Leodro, a common given name at the time, who could have been a local chief. Hem is the same word as Old English hām (home), the Old Low Franconian form would have been *haim.

Another explanation for the name etymology is the Old Low Franconian *Liuthari-ing-haim "home of Luithari's people".

Ernest Nègre notices that the Germanic -heim (sic) is precisely rendered by the Latin mansiones in the earliest document. He hesitates about the personal name contained in this place-name, but believes that it is probably Liutradus instead of Liuthari supported by Marie-Thérèse Morlet, after Albert Dauzat and Charles Rostaing.

The Anglo-Saxon history specialist Daniel Henry Haigh (1819—1879) noticed that the village could share a common etymology with the civil parish of Letheringham in Suffolk, England. and this theory of a Saxon or Anglo-Saxon origin is supported nowadays by linguists that analysed toponyms thought before to be Franconian as Saxon afterwards. Numerous archeological sites in the northern part of France along the channel coast show a very strong Saxon and Anglo-Saxon influence in the early Middle Ages.

== Geology ==
=== Undersurface geology ===
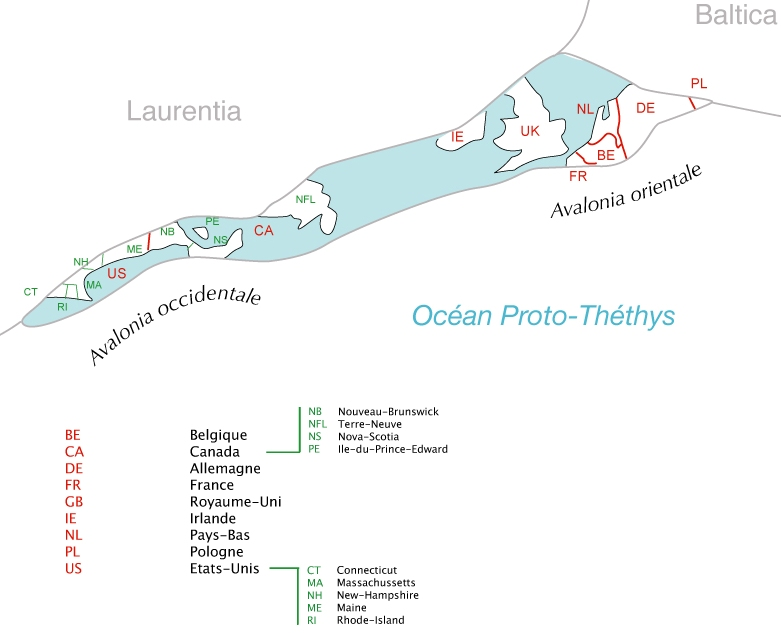
Actual lands (with country boundaries) having been part of Avalonia terrane.

The territory of Ledringhem was part of the microcontinent Avalonia in the Paleozoic era.

Euramerica, also known as Laurussia, was a landmass created in the Devonian as the result of a collision between the Laurentian, Baltica, and Avalonia cratons. Euramerica became a part of the supercontinent Pangaea in the Permian.

In the Jurassic, when Pangaea rifted into two continents, Gondwana and Laurasia, Euramerica was a part of Laurasia.

In the Cretaceous, Laurasia split into the continents of North America and Eurasia. The Laurentian craton became a part of North America while Baltica became a part of Eurasia, and Avalonia was split between the two.

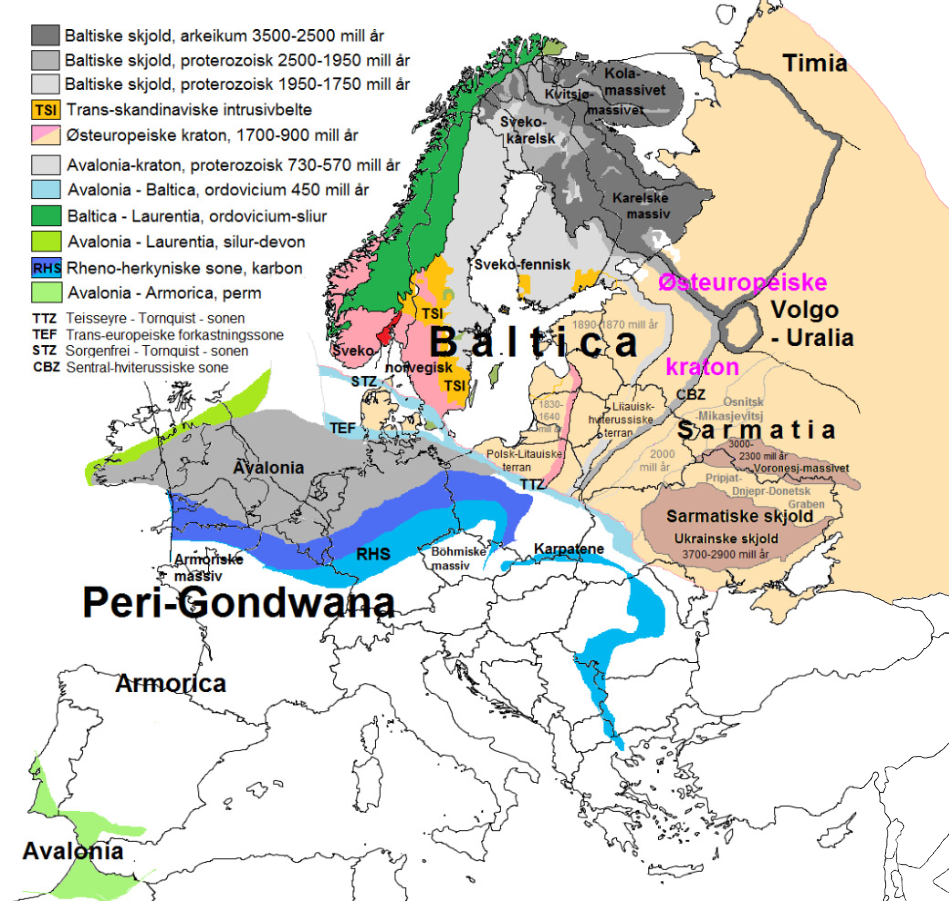

Ledringhem lies on the London-Brabant Massif, a structural high or massif that stretches from the Rhineland in western Germany across northern Belgium (in the province of Brabant) and the North Sea to the sites of East Anglia and the middle Thames in southern England. The London–Brabant Massif is part of the former microcontinent Avalonia. The formation formed an island at some point in geological time. As the island was drifting past the Equator during the Carboniferous, on the shores grew a rich tropical forest swamp.

=== Superficial geology ===
Ledringhem is situated in the Cenozoic Era Bassin de Flandre of French regional geology. It is north of the Weald–Artois Anticline.

== Prehistory ==
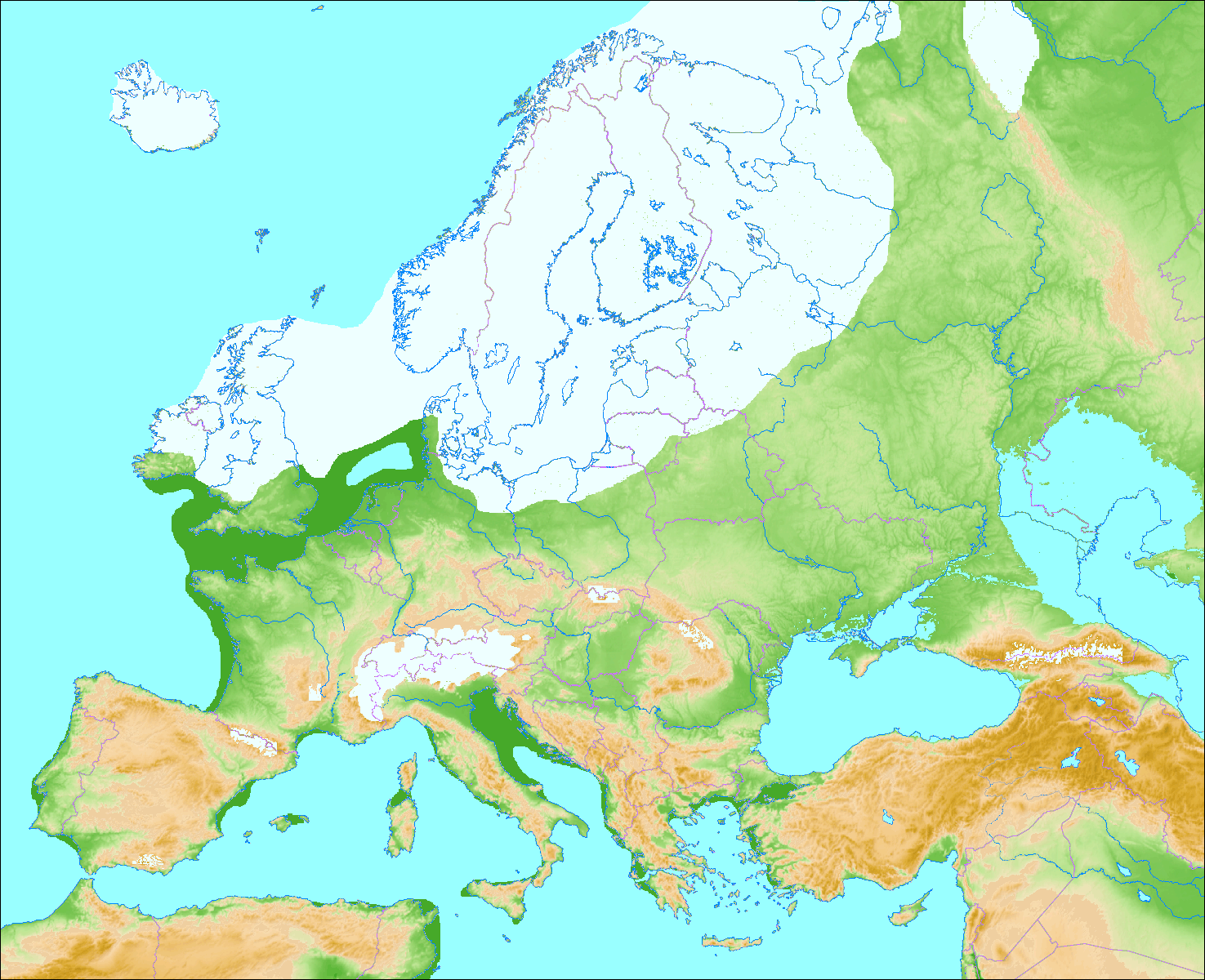
Europe during Weichselian- & Würm-Glaciation

The evidences of the last glacial period, alternatively named Weichsel glaciation or Vistulian glaciation in Europe, suggest that the ice sheets were at their maximum size for only a short period, between 25,000 and 13,000 BP. During the glacial maximum in Scandinavia, only the western parts of Jutland were ice-free, and a large part of what is today the North Sea was dry land connecting Jutland with Britain.

=== Early human settlements ===
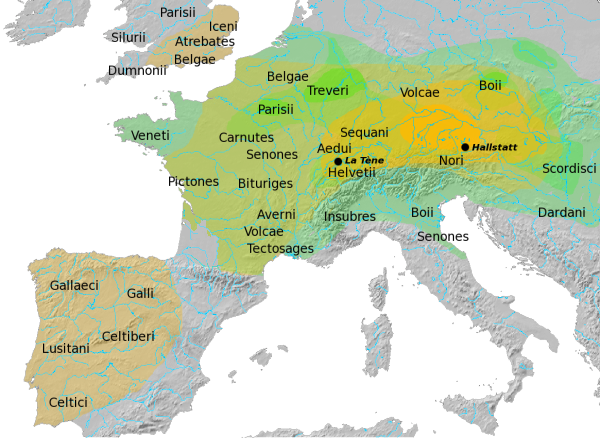
Overview of the Hallstatt and La Tène cultures. The core Hallstatt territory (800 BCE) is shown in solid yellow, the area of influence by 500 BCE (HaD) in light yellow. The core territory of the La Tène culture (450 BCE) is shown in solid green, the eventual area of La Tène influence by 50 BCE in light green. The territories of some major Celtic tribes are labelled. Map drawn after Atlas of the Celtic World, by John Haywood (2001: 30–37).

The territory of Northern France is part of the areas of influence of the Beaker culture (c. 2800–1800 BC), the Atlantic Bronze Age (approximately 1300–700 BC), then of the Hallstatt culture (800 -500 BC) and La Tène culture (450 BC).

== History ==
Archaeological surveys were conducted in 2003 and 2013. The 2013 survey was carried out by the French National Institute for Preventive Archaeological Research (INRAP). The excavations were located south of the village, at the site known as "Route d'Arnèke" (Arneke road), near the Peene Becque River. They revealed thirty-two remains, twenty-one of which could be attributed to a specific chronological period. To the west of the excavated area, some remains were attributed to the La Tène period (the second Iron Age). Other remains were dated to the Gallo-Roman period (Roman Gaul). Furthermore, to the north of the excavation area, other remains have been attributed to the Late Middle Ages. Finally, other, more recent remains, dating from the 16th to 17th centuries, have been uncovered, as well as others, even more contemporary, from the 19th century.

Coins were collected at Les Grenouilles site in Ledringhem. One is a lead bulla from Andrea Contarini, 60th doge of Venice, dating the XIVth century. One is a daalder worth 30 stuivers showing Frederik van den Bergh minted in 1579. 2 coins are lead wheights, one showing a horseman and one a Fleur-de-lis.

=== Gaulish times ===
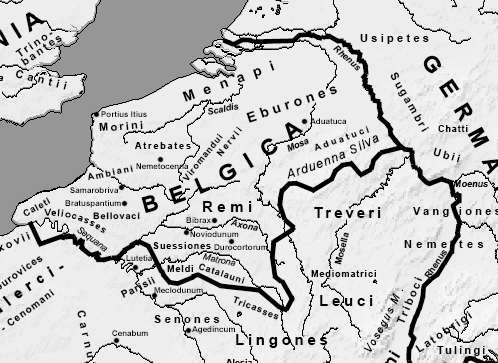
Map of Gallic tribes in Gallia Belgica.

The origins of the village are unclear.

The village could have been occupied since Gaulish times. At that time, the village territory was dry land (or moorland), unlike other territories which were underwater in the "plaine maritime" (see the three Dunkirk transgressions), a polder region made from Les Moëres, part of French Flanders.

The nearby presence of a Roman road (now voie romaine – D52) from Cassel and leading to the sea could have been a reason for an early settlement. This road could have preceded the Romans.

1852 Ledringhem's treasure discovery

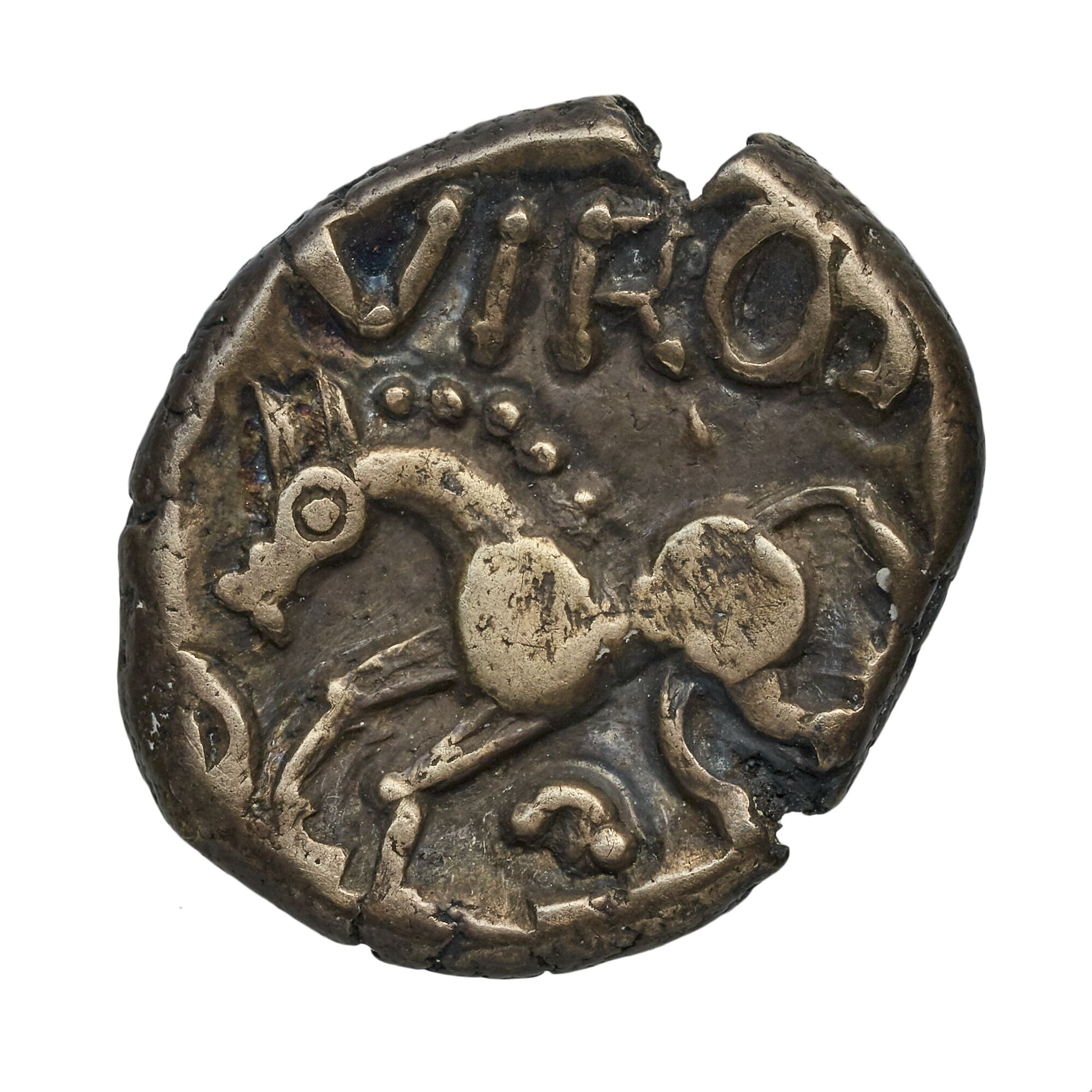
Stater, Nervian, VIROS type, in the National Library of France (Bibliothèque nationale de France).

As a proof of possible gaulish origins, a hoard was discovered in 1852 in Ledringhem. This treasure was estimated by Jérémie Landron (1840–1904), a pharmacist-chemist-gold-and-silver assayer, to be composed of 35 000 small gold coins, described as staters, and locally known as Ledringhem's buttons (boutons de Ledringhem).

The coins were retrieved in an 18-liter vase, which has been lost, by two workers cleaning a farm cesspit of the Mormentyn farm. Each coin was 18 mm wide and weighed approximately 6 grams.

Half of the coins were reddish in color due to a higher richness in copper in the gold-silver-copper alloy, the remaining coins being yellow-white-colored. They presented an image of a running wild horse on one of the two faces.

It has been hypothesized that this treasure could have been hidden underground and never recovered by its Morini or Menapian owners, during troubled times like during the Gallic Wars.

=== Roman time ===
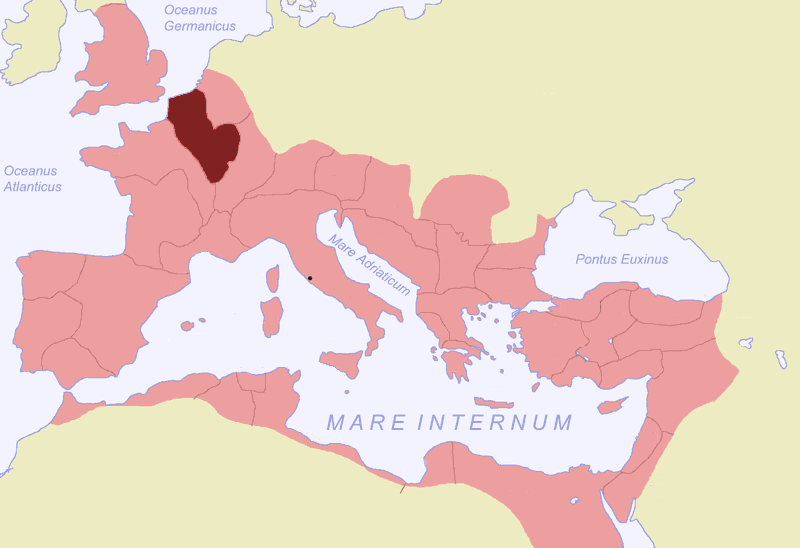
Map of Roman Empire in the 2nd century (116), with Gallia Belgica province highlighted in red.

Julius Caesar conquered the Belgae, beginning in 57 BC. He marched into the territory of the Suessiones and besieged the town of Noviodunum (Soissons). Seeing the Romans' siege engines, the Suessiones surrendered, whereupon Caesar turned his attention to the Bellovaci, who had retreated into the fortress of Bratuspantium (between modern Amiens and Beauvais). They quickly surrendered, as did the Ambiani.

The Nervii, along with the Atrebates and Viromandui, decided to fight (the Atuatuci had also agreed to join them but had not yet arrived). They concealed themselves in the forests and attacked the approaching Roman column at the river Sabis (previously thought to be the Sambre but recently the Selle is thought to be more probable). Their attack was quick and unexpected. The element of surprise briefly left the Romans exposed. Some of the Romans did not have time to take the covers off their shields or to even put on their helmets. However Caesar grabbed a shield, made his way to the front line, and quickly organised his forces. The two Roman legions guarding the baggage train at the rear finally arrived and helped to turn the tide of the battle. Caesar says the Nervii were almost annihilated in the battle, and is effusive in his tribute to their bravery, calling them "heroes".

The Atuatuci, who were marching to their aid, turned back on hearing of the defeat and retreated to one stronghold, were put under siege, and soon surrendered and handed over their arms. However the surrender was a ploy, and the Atuatuci, armed with weapons they had hidden, tried to break out during the night. The Romans had the advantage of position and killed four thousand. The rest, about fifty-three thousand, were sold into slavery.

In 53 BC the Eburones, led by Ambiorix, along with the Nervii, Menapii and Morini, revolted again and wiped out 15 cohorts, only to be put down by Caesar.

The Belgae fought in the uprising of Vercingetorix in 52 BC.

The Menapii again rebelled along with their neighbours, the Morini, in 30 or 29 BC. The Roman governor of Gaul, Gaius Carrinas, successfully quelled the rebellion and the territory of the Menapii was subsequently absorbed into the Roman province of Gallia Belgica.

After their final subjugation, Caesar combined the three parts of Gaul, the territory of the Belgae, Celtae and Aquitani, into a single unwieldy province (Gallia Comata, "long-haired Gaul") that was reorganized by the emperor Augustus into its traditional cultural divisions. The population was partially Romanised from the 1st to 3rd centuries.

The Gallic Empire under Tetricus I by 271 AD (in green)

The Gallic Empire (Latin: Imperium Galliarum) is the modern name for a breakaway realm of the Roman Empire that existed from 260 to 274. It originated during the Crisis of the 3rd Century (AD 235–284). It was retaken by Roman Emperor Aurelian after the Battle of Châlons in 274.

Constantius Chlorus’ first task on becoming Caesar was to deal with the Roman usurper Carausius who had declared himself emperor in Britannia and northern Gaul in 286. In late 293, Constantius defeated the forces of Carausius in Gaul, capturing Bononia (Boulogne-sur-Mer). This precipitated the assassination of Carausius by his rationalis Allectus, who assumed command of the British provinces until his death in 296. Constantius spent the next two years neutralising the threat of the Franks who were the allies of Allectus, as northern Gaul remained under the control of the British usurper until at least 295.

Later Emperor Diocletian restructured the provinces around 300, and split Belgica into two provinces: Belgica Prima and Belgica Secunda. Belgica Prima had Treveri (Trier) as its main city, and consisted of the eastern part. Belgica Secunda was situated between the English channel and the River Meuse, which therefore contained the original "Belgium" that Caesar had described. Reims (Durocortorum) was the capital of that second province.

The Saxon Shore (Latin: litus Saxonicum) was a military command of the late Roman Empire, established during the Crisis of the 3rd Century and consisted of a series of fortifications on both sides of the English channel. It was established in the late 3rd century and was led by the "Count of the Saxon Shore". In the late 4th century, his functions were limited to Britain, while the fortifications in Gaul were established as separate commands, dux tractus Amoricani and dux Belgicae Secundae, with headquarters at Portus Aepatiaci (possibly Étaples).

=== Frankish Empire ===
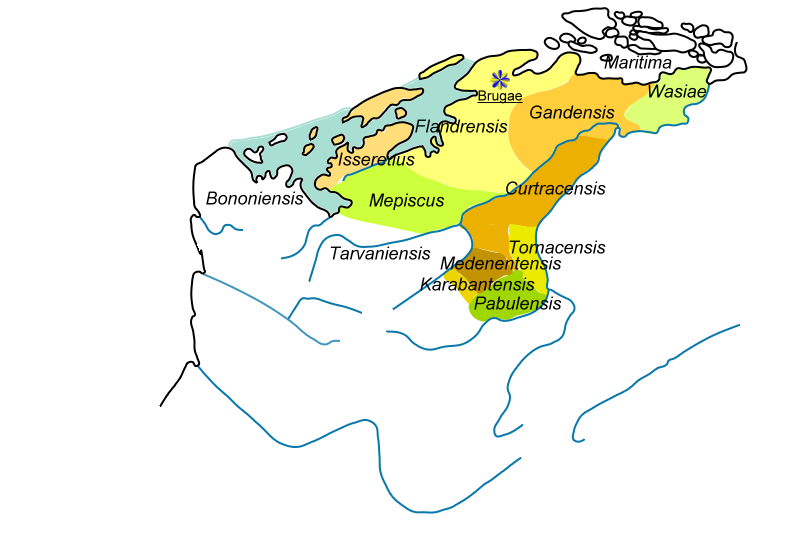
Situation of Pagus Mempiscus. The blue zone corresponds to the future polders (only in the 10th century). The coastline is from the 9th century

Southern part of the Low Countries with bisschopry towns and abbeys c. 7th century. Abbeys were the onset to larger villages and even some towns.

In Gaul, the Franks, a fusion of western Germanic tribes whose leaders had been strongly aligned with Rome since the 3rd century, subsequently entered Roman lands more gradually and peacefully during the 5th century, and were generally endured as rulers by the Roman-Gaulish population.

The Franks became foederati in 358 AD, when Emperor Julian let them keep the areas in northern Gaul, which had been depopulated during the preceding century. Roman soldiers defended the Rhine and had major armies 100 miles (160 km) south and west of the Rhine. Frankish settlers were established in the areas north and east of the Romans and helped with the Roman defense by providing intelligence and a buffer state. The breach of the Rhine borders in the frozen winter of 406 and 407 made an end to the Roman presence at the Rhine when both the Romans and the allied Franks were overrun by a tribal migration en masse of Vandals and Alans.

They emerged victorious and Belgica Secunda became in the 5th century the center of Clovis' Merovingian kingdom and during the 8th century the heart of the Carolingian Empire.

The current territory of the village of Ledringhem became part of Francia, the territory held by Franks, in 481. It became part of West Francia in 843, and more accurately part of Neustria.

From 830 until around 910, the Vikings invaded Flanders. After the destruction caused by Norman and Magyar invasion, the eastern part of the region fell under the eyes of the area's princes.

In 962, Baldwin III, Count of Flanders, son, co-ruler, and heir of Arnulf I died and Arnulf bequeathed Flanders to Lothair of France. On Arnulf's death in 965, Lothair invaded Flanders and took many cities, but was eventually repulsed by the supporters of Arnulf II. He temporarily remained in control of Arras and Douai.

Old Dutch was the Frankish dialects spoken and written in the Low Countries during the Early Middle Ages. It evolved from Old Frankish around the 6th century and in turn evolved into Middle Dutch around the 12th century.

=== Middle Ages ===
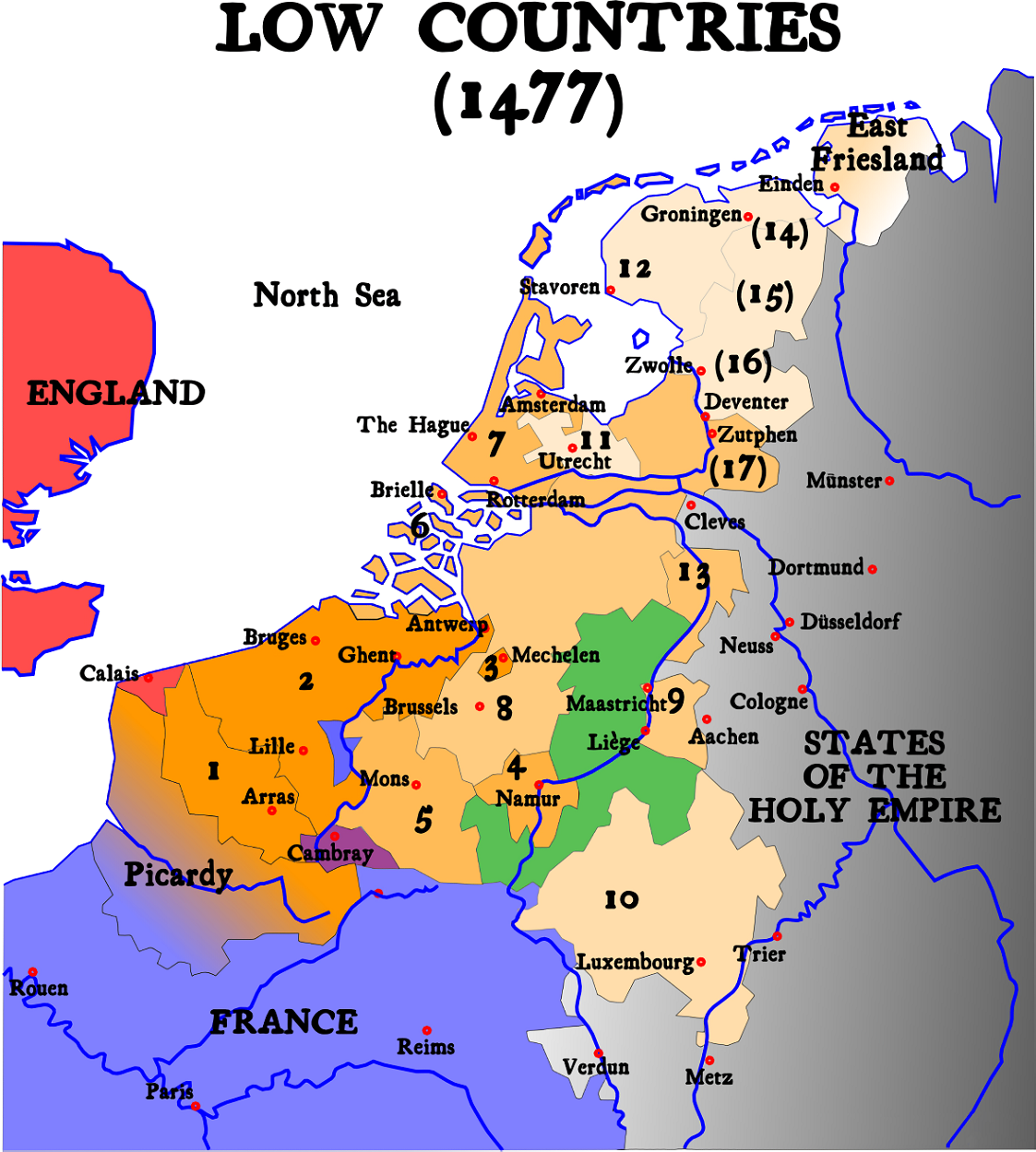
The Seventeen Provinces (orange, brown and yellow areas) and the Bishopric of Liège (green)

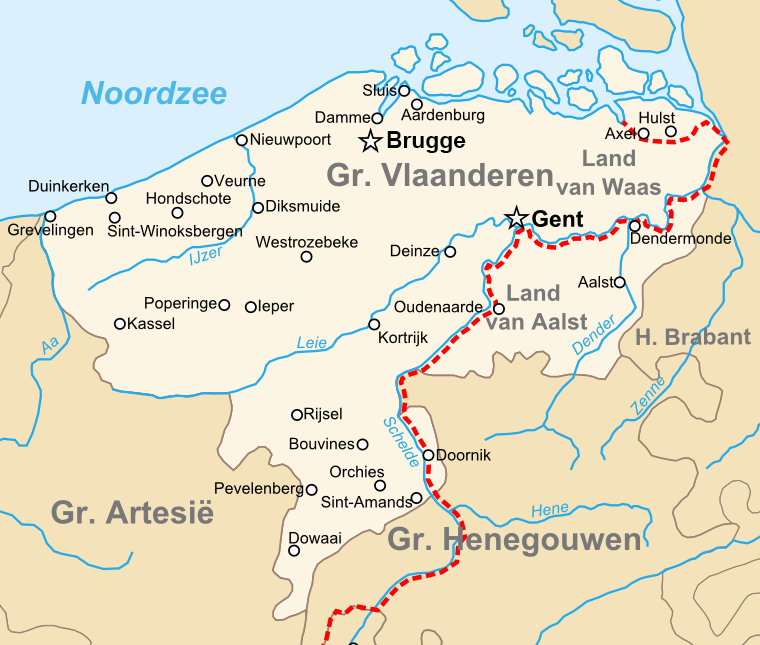
Map of the County of Flanders in the late 14th century.

During the Middle Ages, Ledringhem was one of the 6 fiefs in the Bergues fiefdom, under the jurisdiction of Counts of Flandres. Esquelbecques and Ledringhem were parts of the same fief, but both villages had their own town magistrates.

The County of Flanders was one of the territories constituting the Low Countries. The county existed from 862 to 1795. It was one of the original secular fiefs of France and for centuries was one of the most affluent regions in Europe.

From 1323 to 1328 people from Ledringhem took part to the peasant revolt in Flanders and five of them died in 1328 during the Battle of Cassel.

In 1436, Wautier de Ghistelles was seigneur d'Ekelsbeke et de Ledringhem (Lord of Esquelbecq and Ledringhem) and governor of La Madeleine hospital in Bierne.

In 1469, the fiefdom of Bergues was composed out of 37 villages and Ledringhem had 61 households.

==== English rule over Northern France ====
On 21 May 1420, the Treaty of Troyes is signed. With the Burgundian faction dominant in France, King Charles VI of France acknowledges Henry V of England as his heir and as virtual ruler of most of France.

Charles VII of France and Philip the Good, Duke of Burgundy, then signed the 1435 Treaty of Arras, which allowed the Burgundians to return to the side of the French just as things were going badly for their English allies. With this accomplishment, Charles attained the essential goal of ensuring that no Prince of the Blood recognised Henry VI as King of France. Over the following two decades, the French recaptured Paris from the English and eventually recovered all of France with the exception of the northern port of Calais and the Channel Islands.

==== Habsburg Netherlands ====
Ledringhem was part of the Habsburg Netherlands (1526 to 1556/1581).

On 14 January 1526, the Treaty of Madrid is signed. Peace is declared between Francis I of France and Charles V, Holy Roman Emperor. Francis agrees to cede Burgundy to Charles, and abandons all claims to Flanders, Artois, Naples and Milan.

=== Spanish Netherlands period and Dutch Reformation ===
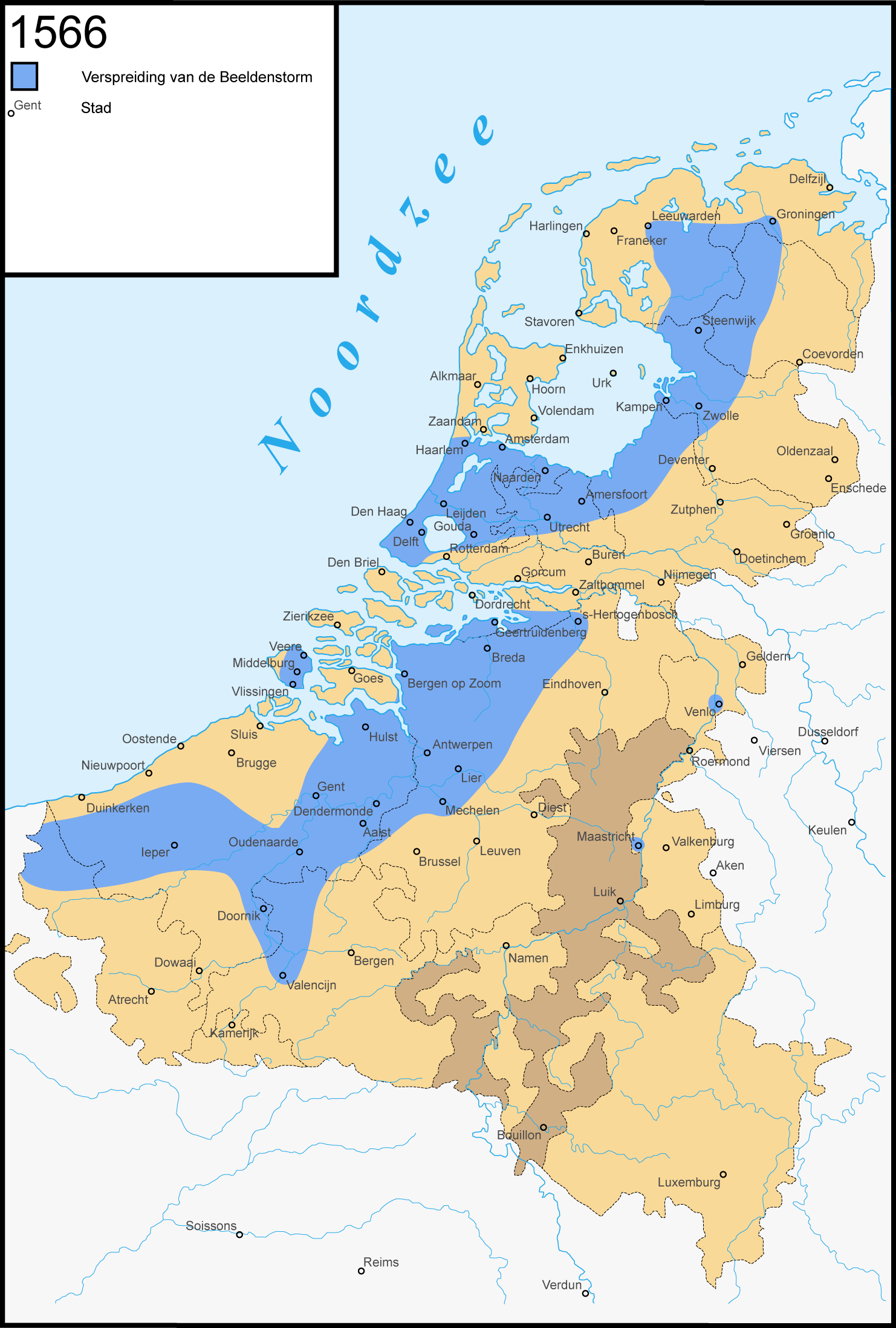
Blue: spread of the Beeldenstorm in the Low Countries.

During the Dutch Reformation Beeldenstorm iconoclasm movement, an episode took place in Ledringhem on Friday 16 August 1566. A depiction of the events is given in:

Jan de Druck was a busy iconoclast. He participated in attacks in Broxeele, Eecke, North and South Berkijn, and Ledringhem, for which he was condemned to death on october 28, 1567, by Alba's special law court, the council of Troubles. His crimes centered on destruction of religious art and objects in parish churches in mid-August 1566: ... He also ransacked several altars at Ledringhem, stealing money amounting to 3 or 4 Parisian pounds and intended "for common devotion." ... Druck's deeds mirror those of other individuals and small groups; at Ledringhem, on September 10, a crowd of about thirty-two seized the priest's house, eating and drinking heartily before they settled down for the night there. Refreshed, the next morning they sacked the local parish church, destroying four altars. They scattered for the balance of the day, some going to Ekelsbeke, other to Arnèke, both sets listening to sermons, only to return at nightfall, this time to the chaplain's house, where they had something to eat and pocketed four candles. Afterward, they randomly searched private houses looking for objects the churchwardens might have hidden, or domestic altars or shrines. The next morning, they continued their efforts, overturning basins of holy oil, smashing up more altars, and shredding the priest's and chaplains's books. As a parting shot, they derisively cut up the chaplain's bonnet.

As Spain was fighting back Reformation, a war developed leading to the formation of a Dutch protestant independent state and the Southern part of the territory still loyal to Catholicism and Spanish power.

As this eighty years war developed, raids against cities and villages occurred. The church of Ledringhem was burnt by orangists during this period. It took several decades for the population to reconstruct it.

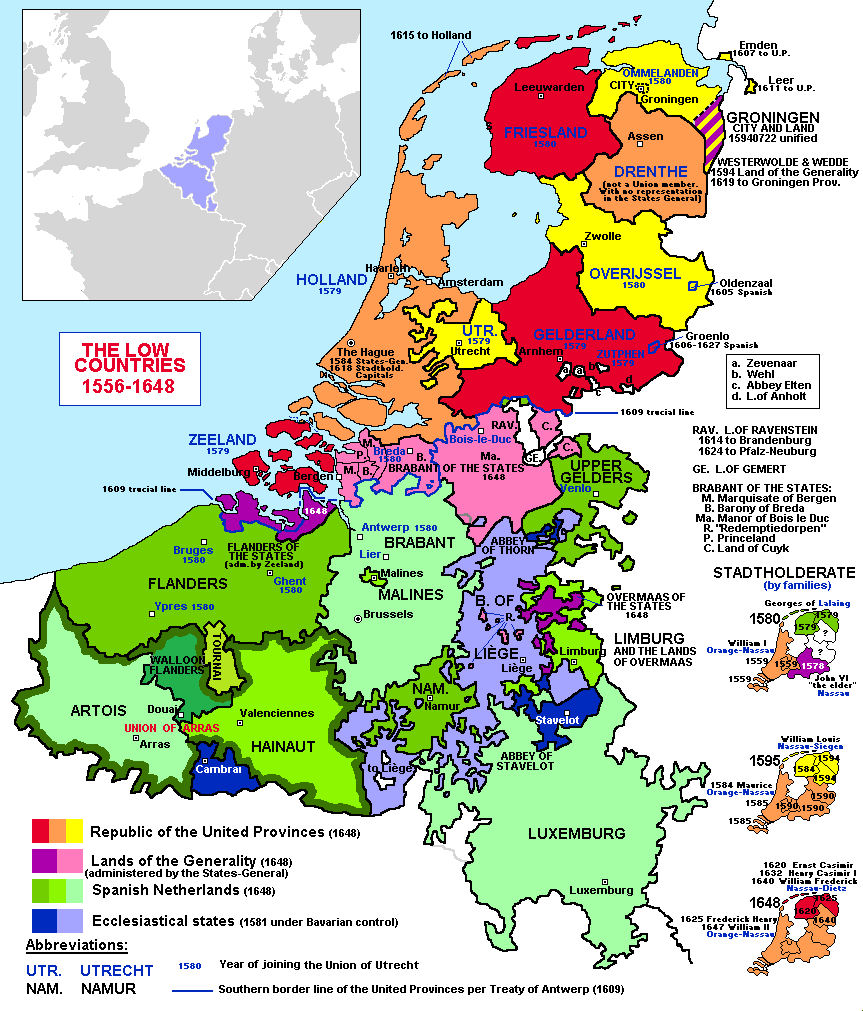
The Low Countries Map (1556–1648)

Ledringhem was part of Southern Netherlands (Dutch: Zuidelijke Nederlanden, Spanish: Países Bajos del Sur, French: Pays-Bas du sud, also called the Catholic Netherlands), a part of the Low Countries controlled by Spain (Spanish Netherlands, 1579–1713), then by Austria after the signing of the Treaty of Utrecht in 1713 (Austrian Netherlands, 1713–1794). The Southern Netherlands remained part of the Burgundian Circle of the Holy Roman Empire until its annexation to France in 1794.

From February to May 1638, a plague episode made victims in Ledringhem.

=== French rule ===
1646 taking of Furnes (Veurne), Dunkirk and Courtrai by Duc d'Enghien 1652 Dunkirk taken back by the Spanish.

On 14 June 1658, Spanish troops of Condé and Juan José de Austria had a severe defeat at the battle of the Dunes, near Dunkirk. Turenne continue his triumphant march into Flanders.

On 22 May 1659, France, England and Netherlands signed the Hedges Concerto treaty. 1659 Treaty of the Pyrenees 1662 Sale of Dunkirk by the English to the French 1672 Franco-Dutch War 1677 Battle of Cassel 1678 taking of Saint-Omer, Treaties of Nijmegen, end of the war

Parts of Flanders became a French possession following the Treaty of Aix-la-Chapelle in 1668, ending the War of Devolution (1667–1668) which saw Louis XIV's French armies overrun the Habsburg-controlled Spanish Netherlands. With the fall of the fortresses of Bergues (6 June 1667), Louis XIV took hold of Ledringhem, part of the Châtellenie.

France gained some territory in Flanders, but nearly all of the Spanish Netherlands, as well as the Franche-Comté, was returned to Spain. Inwardly, Louis XIV was seething. He had hoped to take the entirety of the Spanish Netherlands and felt betrayed by the Dutch, who, to French eyes, were only independent due to French assistance in the Eighty Years' War. The War of Devolution thus led directly to the Franco-Dutch War of 1672–1678.

The consequences of the War of Devolution were manifold. From a purely military perspective, France had gained some advantages, by breaking through the ring of fortresses that surrounded the Spanish Netherlands. This simultaneously increased the French defensive power, as Vauban immediately set about expanding the conquered cities into strong fortifications. These in turn served as starting points from which further French campaigns of conquest could be launched in later wars.

=== French Revolution ===
After the French Revolution, French rule has been secured with revolutionary victory in the Battle of Hondshoote in 1793 against English and Austrian troops wanting to get hold of Dunkirk port.
In 1794 the entire region of the Spanish/Austrian Netherlands was overrun by France ending the existence of this territory as such. This was resisted by the Flamingant movement organized by Roman Catholic clergy. Austria confirmed the loss of its territories by the Treaty of Campo Formio, in 1797.

Henri-Louis de Guernoval, marquis d'Esquelbecq (1729–1801) (marquis de Ledringhem), captain in second of Louis XIV Royal-Cravattes regiment was the last of the nobility member to administer Ledringhem.

=== First French Empire ===
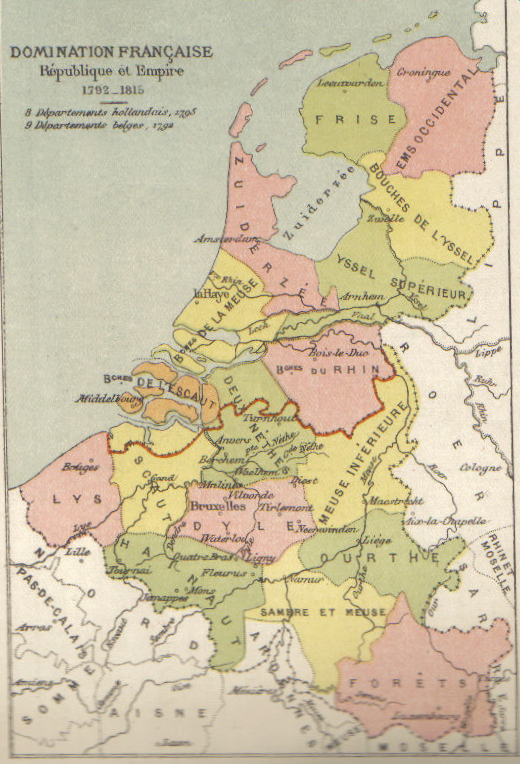
Map of Belgium and the Netherlands during the French occupation (1793–1815).

Ledringhem became part of the First French Empire 1810 Napoleonic Nord département. Most of the Low Countries were also annexed. After Napoleon's defeat at Leipzig (October 1813), the French troops retreated to France. The Treaty of Kortrijk (Dutch: Verdrag van Kortrijk), signed 28 March 1820 in the Belgian city of Kortrijk laid out the boundaries between France and the United Kingdom of the Netherlands (under the reign of King William I of the Netherlands). Nowadays, these boundaries still stand, with some minor corrections, as the official boundary between Belgium and France. In 1830, the Belgian Revolution led to the separation of the Southern Provinces from the Netherlands.

=== World wars ===
Shrapnel, like canon shells and bullet casings can still be found in and around the fields here. They are usually found by farmers ploughing, and date back to World Wars.

World War I

German Schlieffen Plan in 1914 was to invade Belgium to better attack France to the north.

Thus, at the beginning, the war was a mobility war. At that time, French bicycle riding 3e Groupe de Chasseurs Cyclistes were in Ledringhem during the First Battle of Ypres in November 1914. As the war turned into a trenches war with the front established to the east near Ypres, some 30 km away, Ledringhem served as a resting and training place (billet) to the rear. French 12th cuirassiers were there in December 1914 – September 1915, British horse-riding 20th Hussars 7 May 1915, the 75th Brigade RFA in May–June 1916, the 1st Royal Marine Battalion from 14 to 22 November 1917, French 114ème Régiment d'Artillerie Lourde and 15e Régiment de Dragons in May 1918, and 2e Régiment d'Artillerie de Campagne in August 1918. These French troops are then replaced (26–28 June 1918) by English men of the 187th and 190th brigades of the 41st division (2e RAC JMO 26N906-23, 27 & 31).

World War II

A violent battle took place in Ledringhem during the Battle of France in May 1940, which involved British soldiers against German troops. On 27 to 29 May 1940, the British 5th Glosters got separated from the rest of the British forces in Ledringhem and became involved in fierce combats against motorized German troops. Several casualties among the British soldiers, including officers and also French civilians, occurred during the fight. The 2nd Gloucestershire Rifle Volunteers was a battalion that distinguished itself at the defence of Ledringhem before being evacuated from Dunkirk.

Nevertheless, the village was never conquered by the Germans at that time, and finally the British escaped to embark in Dunkirk evacuation during Operation Dynamo. There is a Military Cemetery located at the site of the battle.

Other casualties were made by Leibstandarte SS Adolf Hitler by killing prisoners gathered in a barn at La Plaine au Bois in Wormhoudt on Tuesday 28 May 1940.

Also during that period, the windmill in Ledringhem has been burnt down. The head of the windmill served to repair the Drievenmeulen in Steenvoorde.

After the 1940 defeat, Belgium and Northern France were put under Nazi Germany control. The structure remained in existence until July 1944.

==== War monuments ====
The French Monument to the Dead (Monument aux Morts) presents 25 names, 15 of which being French soldiers killed during the first World War, the other ten being civilian victims during World War II. It is situated in the cemetery near the church.

In the British military part of the cemetery containing 52 graves, there is a Cross of Sacrifice.

== Population ==
Historical population

Year	Pop.	±% p.a.
1793	710	—
1821	704	−0.03%
1846	702	−0.01%
1872	659	−0.24%
1901	478	−1.10%
1926	466	−0.10%
1946	431	−0.39%
1962	399	−0.48%
1968	418	+0.78%

Year	Pop.	±% p.a.
1975	403	−0.52%
1982	522	+3.77%
1990	533	+0.26%
1999	507	−0.55%
2007	667	+3.49%
2012	680	+0.39%
2017	661	−0.57%
2023	611	−1.30%

From the year 1962 on: population without double counting
Source: EHESS and INSEE

== Administration ==
Town hall :.

Mayors :

- 2001–2008, 2008–2014, 2014–current : Christian Delassus
- 1995–2001 : Christian (Roger Germain) Deblock
- Jules Arthur Gabriel Deblock (1877–?), father of Roger
- 1893 : Amand (Aimé Erremond) Cailliau (1842–1923)
- 1870 : M. Vanhoucke
- 1861 : Pierre (Augustin Ambroise) Devulder (1814–?)
- 1854 : M. Wispelaere.
- 1806 : M. Blanckaert
- Pierre Jacques Cornil Hondermarck (1774–1834)
- Charles Winoc Hondermarck (1772–1829)

Ledringhem doesn't participate in a twinnage program with a foreign country municipality.

personalities

- Roger Deblock (1908–1994, in Ledringhem), senator of Nord from 1969 to 1974
- Gabriel Deblock (1935 in Ledringhem-2006), son of Roger, député of Nord from 1993 to 1997

== Transportation ==
There is a bus stop, for pupils to go to collège in Wormhout, or the high school in Hazebrouck, or to go to Wormhout.

The nearest railway stations are in Arnèke and Esquelbecq, for transport to Dunkirk or Hazebrouck and Lille Flandres.

== Accommodations ==
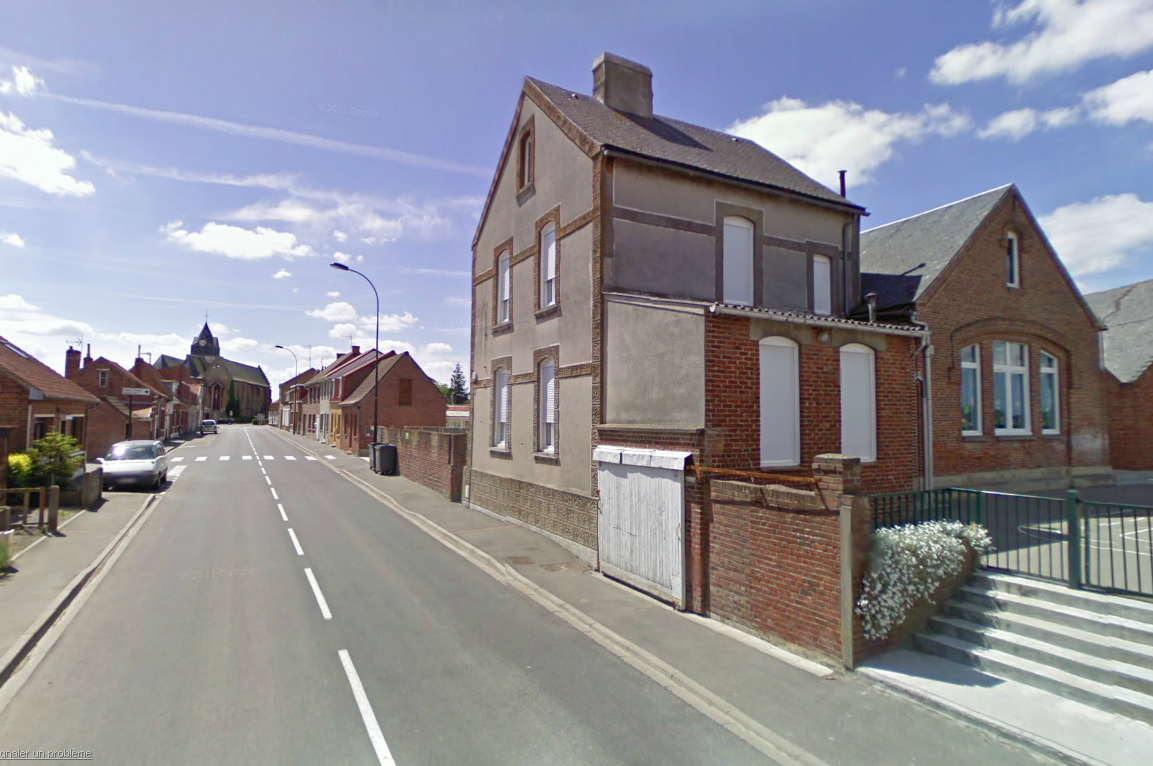
View on Ledringhem's school

There is a municipal school (Ecole "Les boutons d'Or – Butter Bloeme") in Ledringhem. The building dates 1857. The French name "Les boutons d'Or" (golden buttons) may refer to the golden coins making up the Ledringhem's treasure (discovered in 1852).

There is also a multi-sport stadium and a feasting hall (salle des fêtes).

There is le Trou Flamand estaminet (Flemish-style café-restaurant) which is also a general store situated on the main square and the inn Auberge Du Kok-smid situated along route de Wormhout.

== Economy ==
The village main resources are agriculture productions. These include cereals (wheat, barley, oat), flax, fodder (mangel) and sugar beets, potatoes, horticulture and cattle raising (cows, pigs, fowls, ...).

There are a few other businesses and also a general practitioner.

== Social life ==
List of associations in Ledringhem:

- Alcyon, Association pour le rayonnement de la francophonie, help to French speaking students
- Association Audrey 59 Steven
- Association des parents d'élèves de l'école publique de Ledringhem (APEEPL), pupil's parents association
- Association Jeunesse et ambitions
- Association Nature et Patrimoine de Ledringhem (ANPL), Nature and Patrimony association
- Club Agro Convergence
- Frisons en Flandre, Friesian horses association
- Jogging club de Wormhout
- La Jet moins set moto, moto association
- Lame Soeur, help to musicians association
- La Petite Reine Ledringhemoise, bicycling association
- L'Art Sauv., art at the hospital association
- Les Pieds Tanqués, pétanque association
- Les Quickpitchenaeres, carnival association
- Union nationale des combattants de Ledringhem, war veterans association
- Wormhout Volley-Sport
- international association : Association Franco-Britannique de la Plaine au bois, French-British association for La Plaine au bois massacre commemoration, with mayors of Esquelbecq, Ledringhem and Llandudno.

Patron saint fest (Ducasse) occurs during June first Sunday.

== Main sights ==
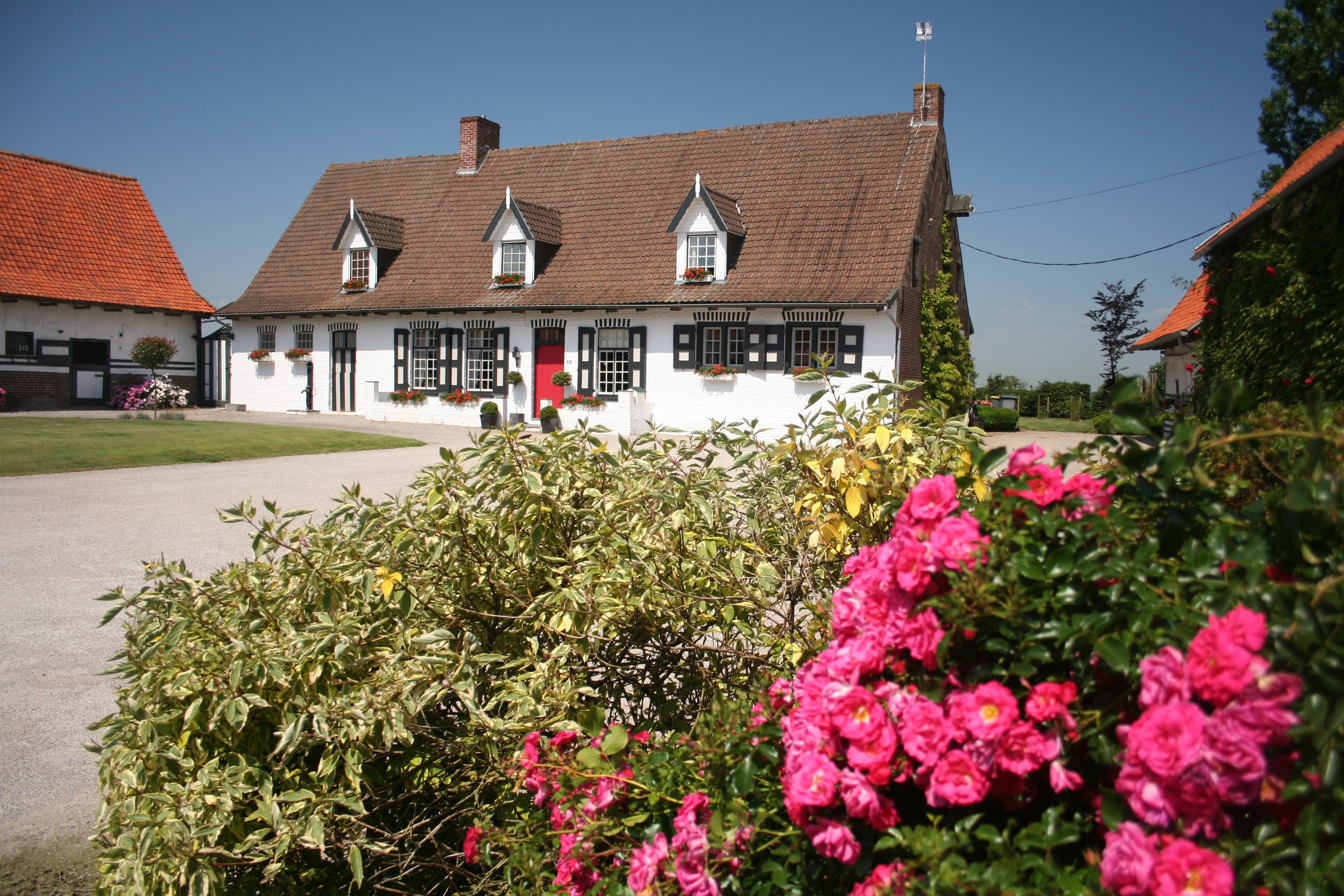
Farmhouse (hofstede) in Ledringhem

- Paeltronck Hoeve (French : ferme du têtard borne) is a typical Flemish farm.

Religious patrimony

- The catholic Hall church-type "hallekerque", with three same-sized naves, is dedicated to Audomar (Saint-Omer) dating 16th century (1548), with an organ and an 18th-century pulpit, an 18th-century tabernacle and a 17th-century retable dedicated to saint Omer. It is made of red bricks. There are several runic-like shapes, made of yellow-coloured bricks, included in the red-coloured brick masonry, around the building. The roof and bell tower are covered with slates.
- Several small chapels and crosses are scattered all around the village.
Church

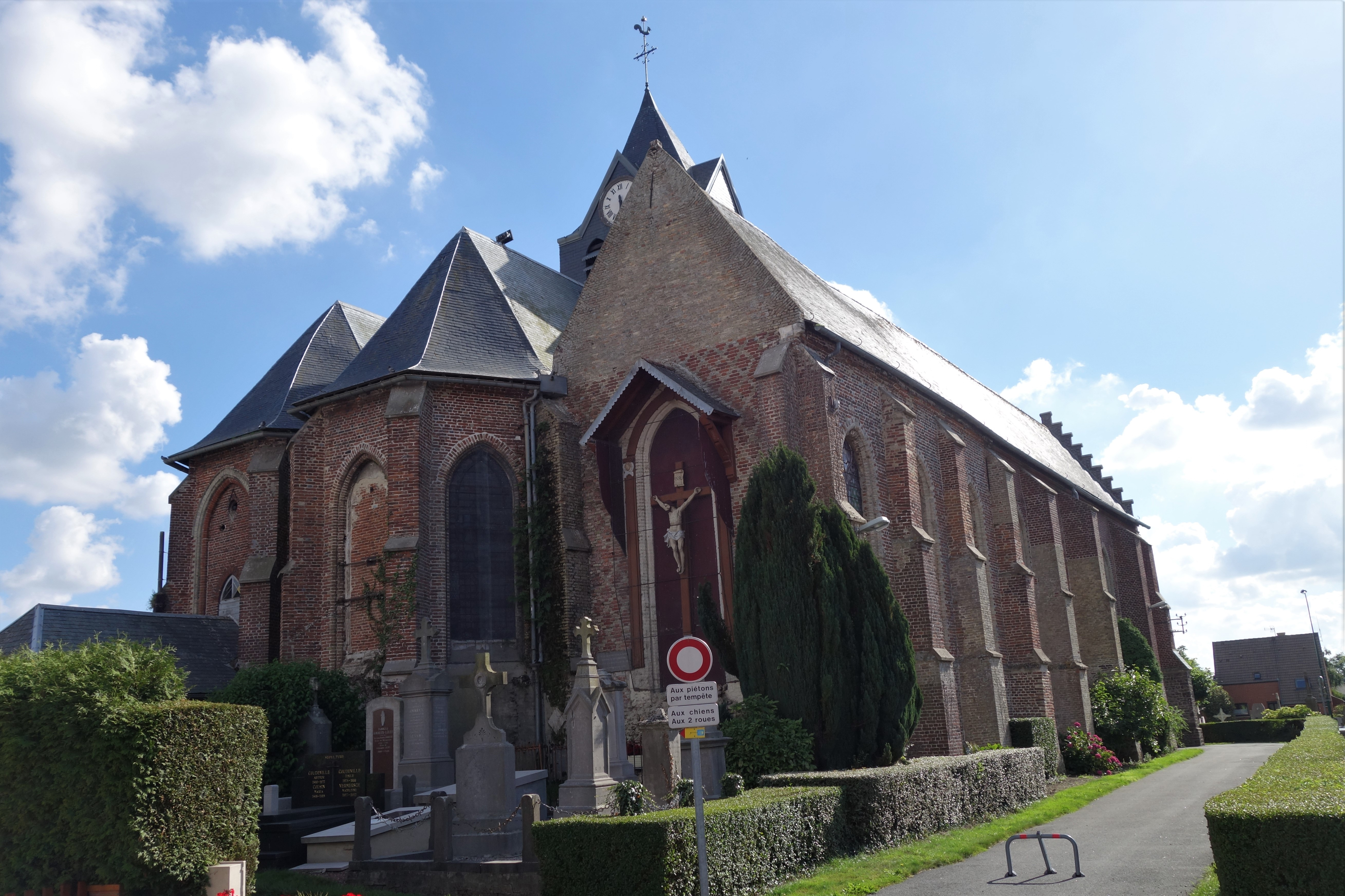
Front view of the church with its double apse chevet and calvary

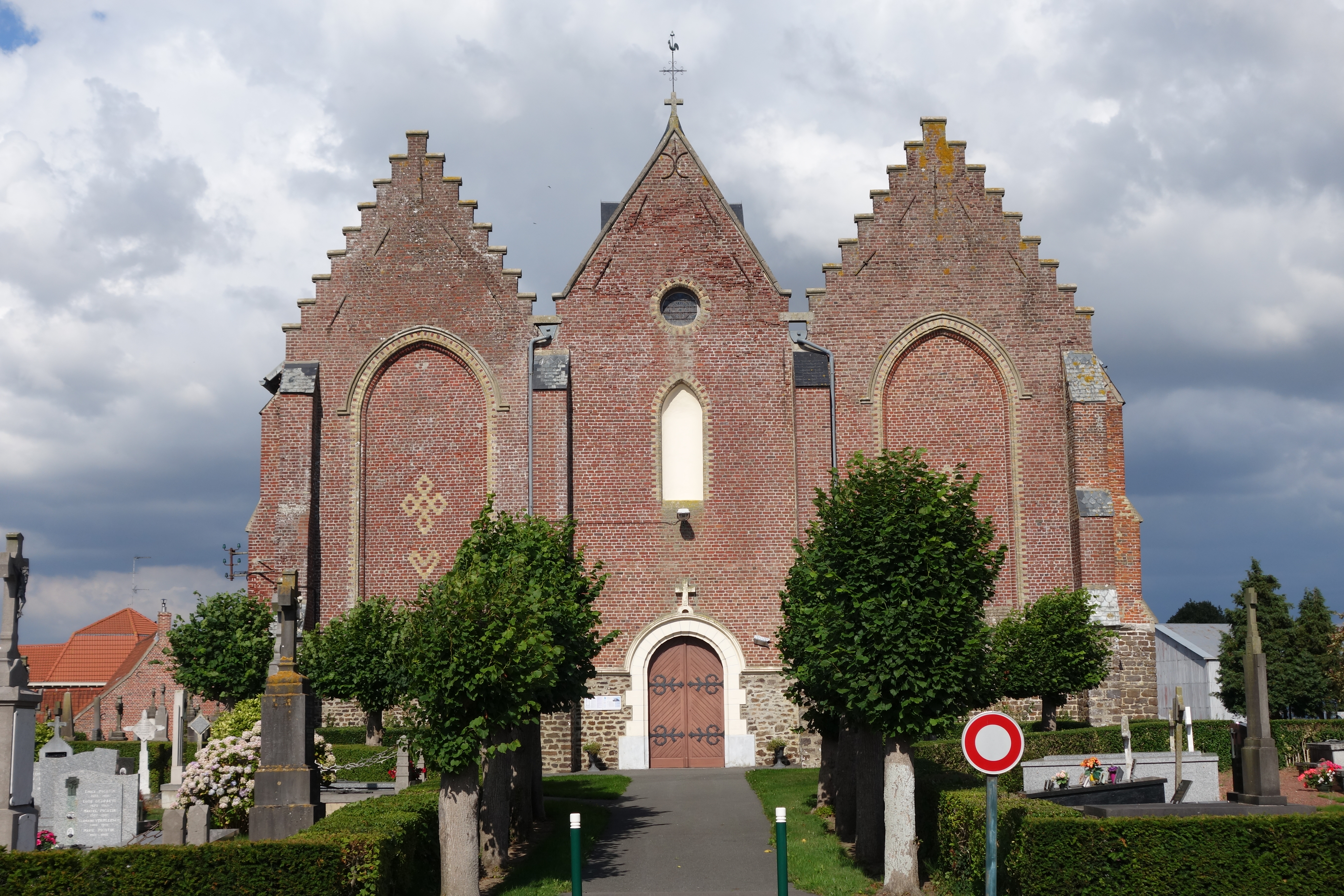
Church hall or hallekerk (hallekerk), made up of three naves, Romanesque A runic-shaped design on the gable of the church, on the left

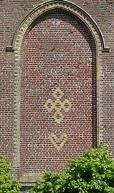
Examples of rune-shaped designs found on Ledringhem's church (a five-lozenges cross and a heart on the façade)
