= Roman roads in the Nord department =

Set of 7 roads in Nord, France

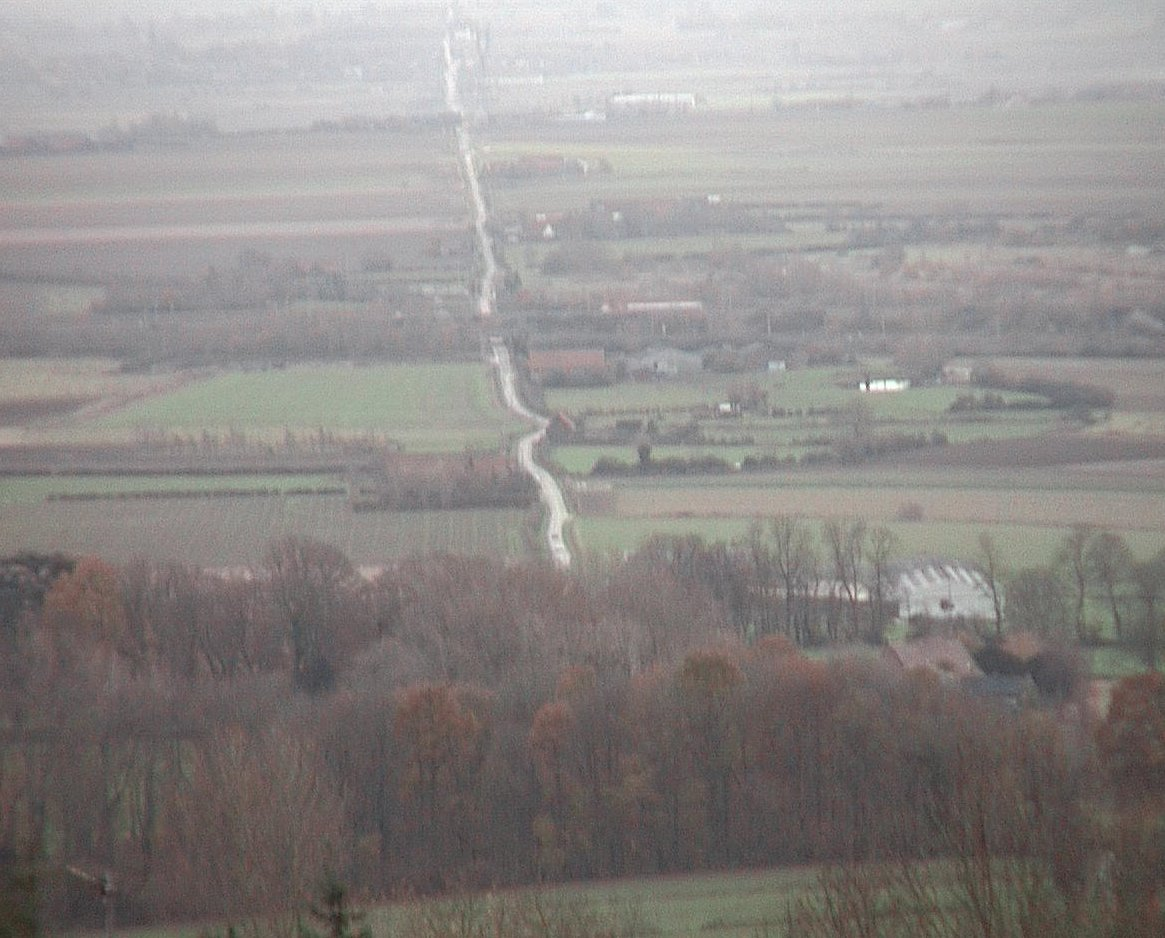
Voie romaine viewed from Cassel

There are seven Roman roads (Voie romaine) in the Nord département in France.

== Départementale 52 ==
The Steen-straete, also called départementale 52 (RD52 or D52), is a road between Cassel and the sea. It was at a time a Roman road, north-south direction extending from Boëseghem, passing by Cassel to the sea. It now leads to Dunkirk. This road could have preceded the Romans.

It forms the villages limit between Ledringhem and Arnèke, between Zegerscappel and Esquelbecq and between Pitgam-Steene and Crochte.

== Départementale 238 ==
From Boëseghem to Cassel, the section is now départementale (RD 238 or D238).

=== Communauté de communes de la Voie romaine ===
There is a Communauté de communes in Nord département called Communauté de communes de la Voie romaine, gathering the villages of Boëseghem, Morbecque, Steenbecque and Thiennes.
