= Gudwal =

Welsh bishop and confessor

Saint Gudwal (fl. 650) was a Welsh bishop and confessor.

== Life ==
Gudwal is said to have been of noble parentage and a native of Wales. At an early age he entered the priesthood, and became a bishop. Afterwards he led a party of 188 monks across the sea to Cornwall, where they were hospitably received by Mevor, a prince of the country, and Gudwal founded a monastery not far off (according to the Bollandists, in Devon). After his death his monks carried his body to Montreuil in Picardy, and it eventually, in 955 or 959, found a resting-place in the monastery of Blandinberg at Ghent, where his festival was kept on 6 June.

Relics of Gudwal were also preserved at Yèvre-le-Châtel and Pithiviers in the Gâtinais. Such is briefly the legend as given by the Bollandists, but Surius and Malbrancq make Mevor a native of Picardy, reading Corminia (Cormont) for Cornuvia (Cornwall), and say that it was there that Gudwal established his monastery. The parish of Gulval, near Penzance, is dedicated to him, and there is a celebrated holy well there, but the old oratory has been destroyed. Gudwal's life and miracles were written by a monk of Blandinberg in the twelfth century (the writer refers to Abbot Gislebert, who died in 1138), but there seems to have been an older life which has perished. The full life is printed in the 'Acta Sanctorum,' and abbreviations of it are given by Capgrave and Surius.

Gudwal must be distinguished from St. Gudwal or Gurval, an Irish monk and disciple of St. Brendan, who became second bishop of St. Malo in the seventh century. This saint's festival was also kept on 6 June, though the day is sometimes given as 6 January.
