= Bierne =

Bierne Bieren (West Flemish)
- Commune
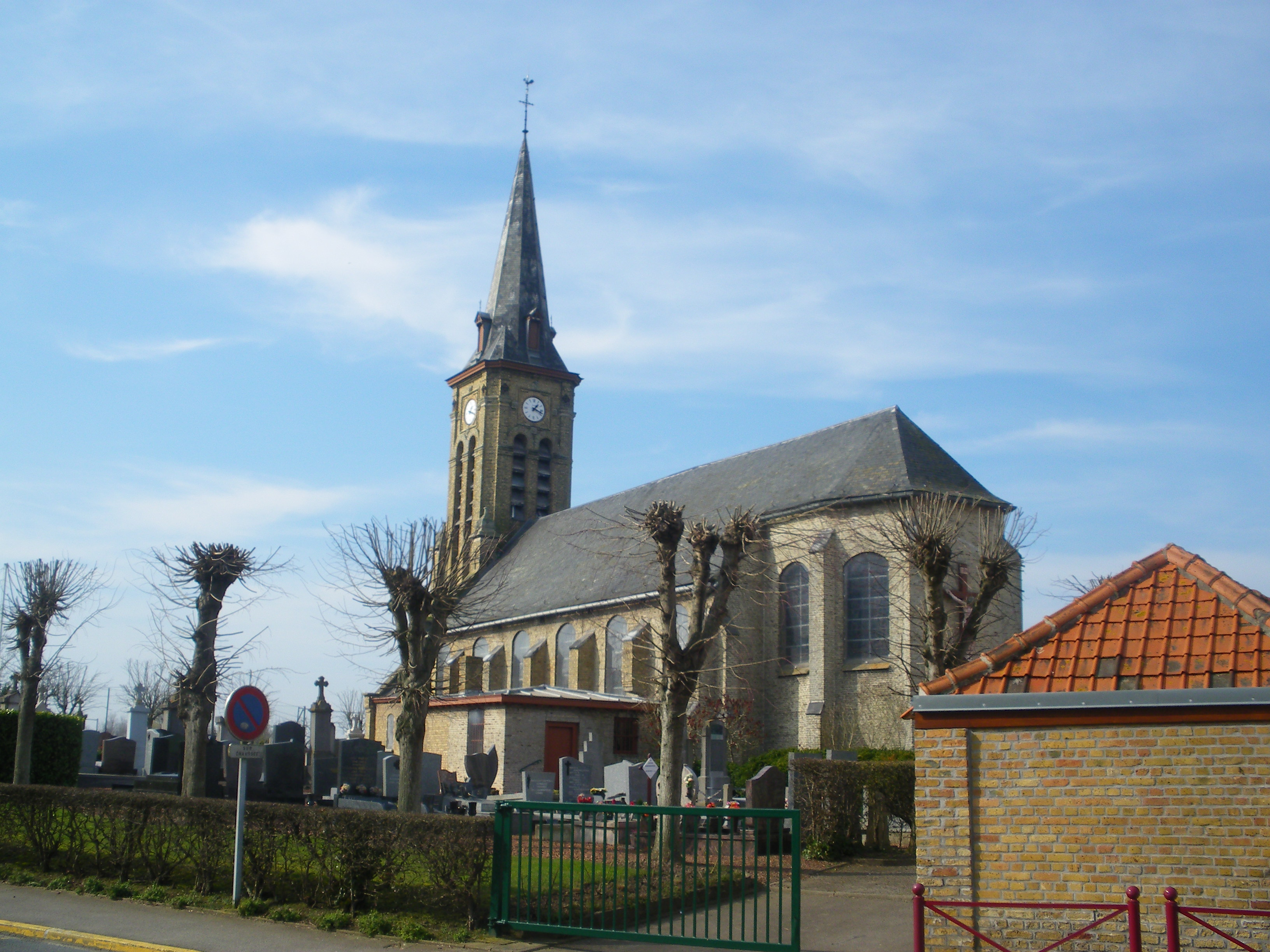
- The church in Bierne

- Coat of arms
- Location of Bierne
- Location within France Location within Hauts-de-France
- Coordinates: 50°57′48″N 2°24′42″E
- Country: France
- Region: Hauts-de-France
- Department: Nord
- Arrondissement: Dunkerque
- Canton: Coudekerque-Branche
- Intercommunality: CC Hauts de Flandre

Government
  - Mayor (2024–2026): Jean-Jacques Verhaeghe
- Area^{1}: 11.04 km^{2} (4.26 sq mi)
- Elevation: 2 m (6.6 ft)
- Highest elevation: 11 m (36 ft)
- Lowest elevation: 0 m (0 ft)
- Population (2023): 1,716
  - Density: 155.4/km^{2} (402.6/sq mi)
- Time zone: UTC+01:00 (CET)
  - Summer (DST): UTC+02:00 (CEST)
- INSEE/Postal code: 59082 /59380
- ^{1} French Land Register data, which excludes lakes, ponds, glaciers > 1 km^{2} (0.386 sq mi or 247 acres) and river estuaries.

Bierne (French pronunciation: [bjɛʁn]; French Flemish: Bieren) is a commune in the Nord department in northern France.

== History ==
In 1436, Wautier de Ghistelles was seigneur d'Ekelsbeke et de Ledringhem (Lord of Esquelbecq and Ledringhem) and governor of La Madeleine hospital in Bierne.

== Population ==
Historical population
Year	Pop.	±% p.a.
1968	676	—
1975	663	−0.28%
1982	1,041	+6.66%
1990	1,621	+5.69%
1999	1,732	+0.74%
2007	1,634	−0.73%
2012	1,703	+0.83%
2017	1,831	+1.46%
2023	1,716	−1.08%
Source: INSEE

== Heraldry ==
Arms of Bierne	The arms of Bierne are blazoned : Argent, a cross between in orle 12 martlets gules.

== See also ==
- Communes of the Nord department
