= Arnèke =

Arnèke Arnyke (West Flemish)
- Commune
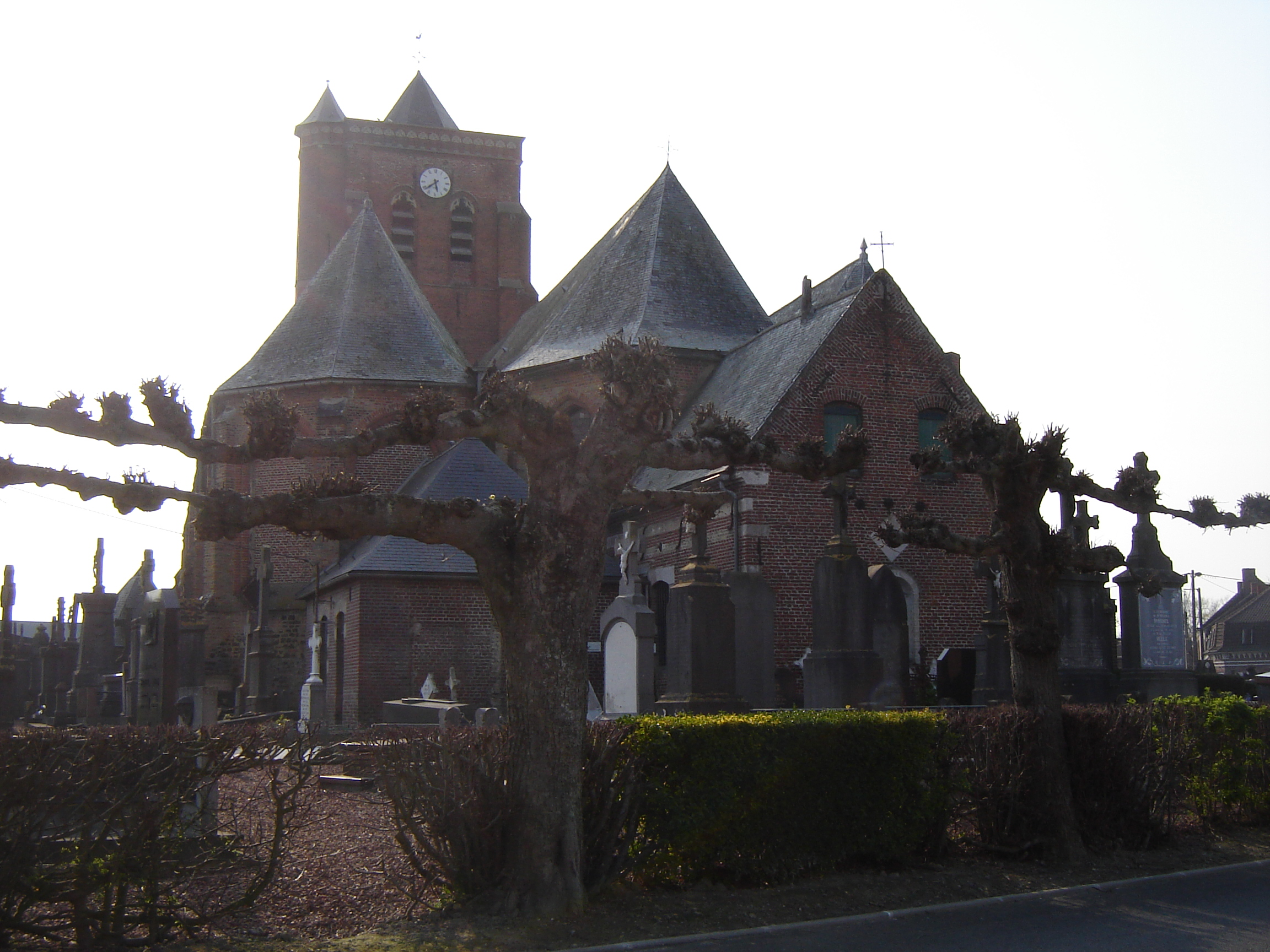
- Saint Martin

- Coat of arms
- Location of Arnèke
- Location within France Location within Hauts-de-France
- Coordinates: 50°49′53″N 2°24′43″E
- Country: France
- Region: Hauts-de-France
- Department: Nord
- Arrondissement: Dunkerque
- Canton: Wormhout
- Intercommunality: CA Cœur de Flandre

Government
  - Mayor (2025–2026): Julie Adjovi
- Area^{1}: 13.41 km^{2} (5.18 sq mi)
- Elevation: 25 m (82 ft)
- Highest elevation: 50 m (160 ft)
- Lowest elevation: 14 m (46 ft)
- Population (2023): 1,594
  - Density: 118.9/km^{2} (307.9/sq mi)
- Time zone: UTC+01:00 (CET)
  - Summer (DST): UTC+02:00 (CEST)
- INSEE/Postal code: 59018 /59285
- ^{1} French Land Register data, which excludes lakes, ponds, glaciers > 1 km^{2} (0.386 sq mi or 247 acres) and river estuaries.

Arnèke (French pronunciation: [aʁnɛk]; French Flemish: Arnyke; Dutch: Arneke) is a commune in the Nord department in northern France.

== Geography ==
Arnèke is situated on the D55 (route de Wormhout). The small river Peene Becque is flowing through the village. The village eastern limit with Ledringhem is voie romaine (D52) and southern limit is Peene Becque.

== Population ==
Historical population
Year	Pop.	±% p.a.
1968	1,256	—
1975	1,390	+1.46%
1982	1,474	+0.84%
1990	1,568	+0.78%
1999	1,549	−0.14%
2007	1,571	+0.18%
2012	1,604	+0.42%
2017	1,617	+0.16%
2023	1,594	−0.24%
Source: INSEE

== Heraldry ==
Arms of Arnèke	The arms of Arnèke are blazoned : Sable, on a cross argent, 5 ermine spots sable.

== Transportation ==
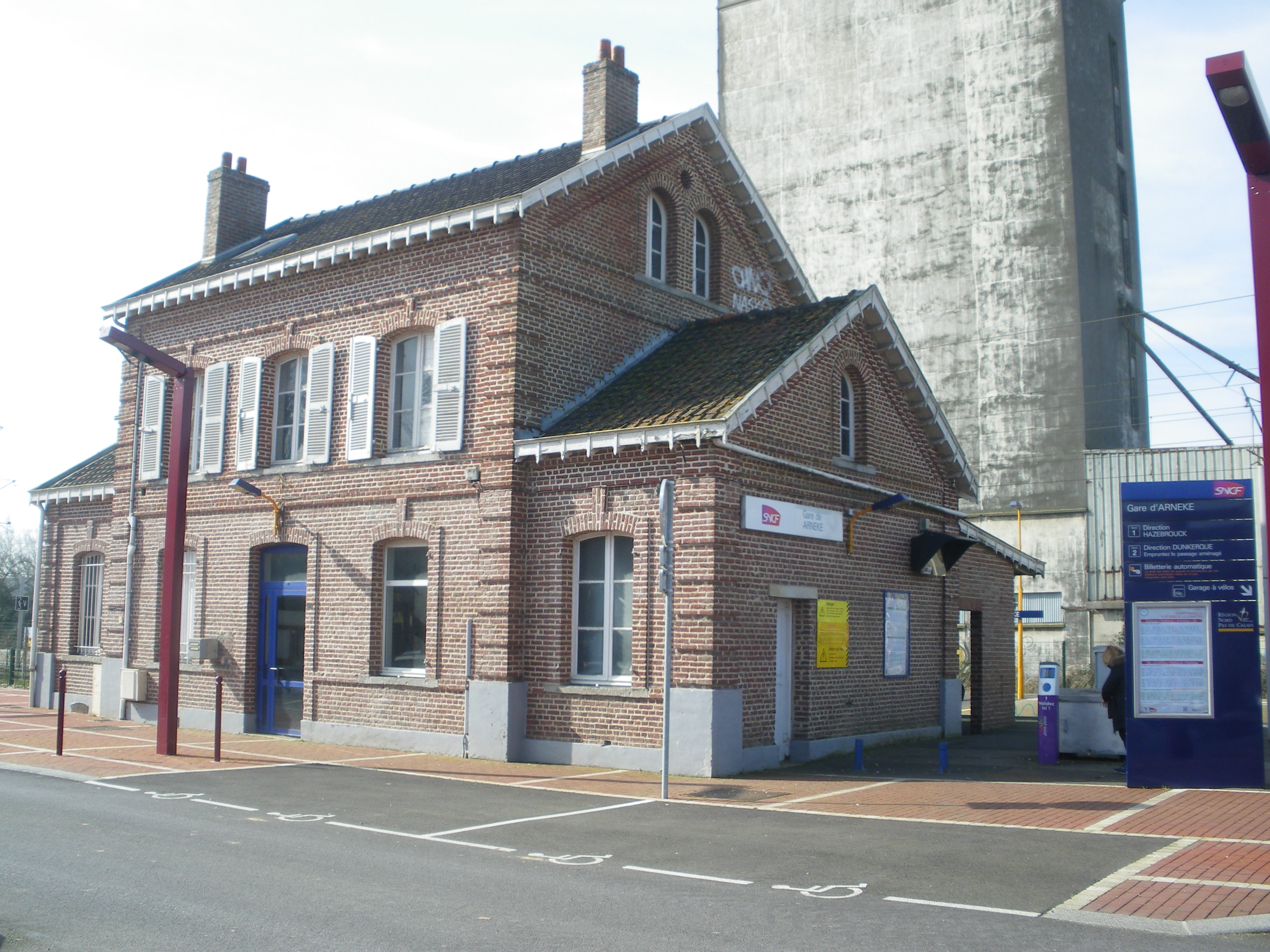
Arneke train station

A train station is serving the village.

== See also ==
- Communes of the Nord department
