= Esquelbecq =

Esquelbecq Ekelsbeke
- Commune
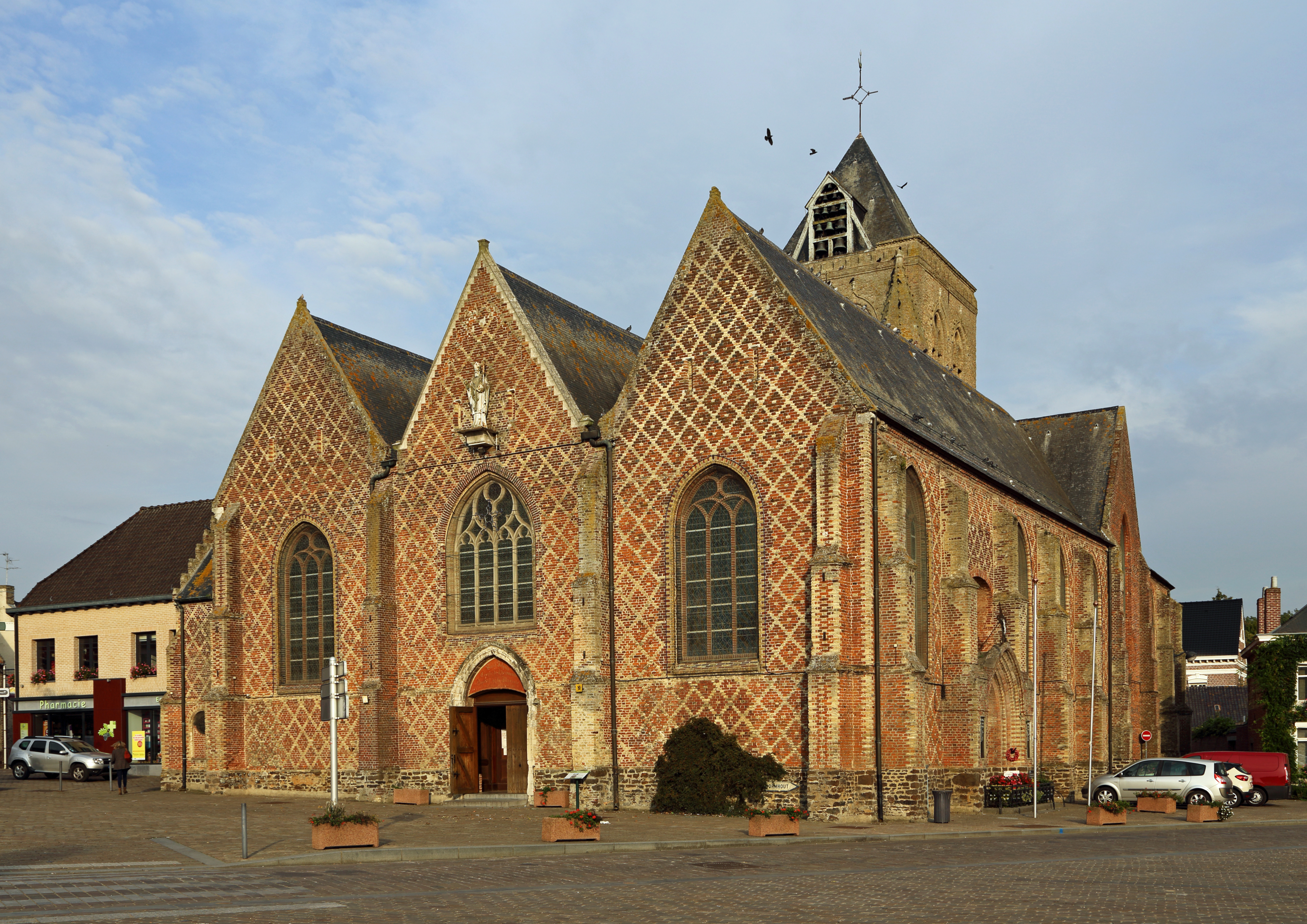
- St Folcwin church in Esquelbecq

- Coat of arms
- Location of Esquelbecq
- Location within France Location within Hauts-de-France
- Coordinates: 50°53′11″N 2°25′55″E
- Country: France
- Region: Hauts-de-France
- Department: Nord
- Arrondissement: Dunkirk
- Canton: Wormhout
- Intercommunality: CC Hauts de Flandre

Government
  - Mayor (2020–2026): Didier Roussel
- Area^{1}: 12.7 km^{2} (4.9 sq mi)
- Elevation: 21 m (69 ft)
- Highest elevation: 29 m (95 ft)
- Lowest elevation: 11 m (36 ft)
- Population (2023): 2,137
  - Density: 168/km^{2} (436/sq mi)
- Time zone: UTC+01:00 (CET)
  - Summer (DST): UTC+02:00 (CEST)
- INSEE/Postal code: 59210 /59470
- ^{1} French Land Register data, which excludes lakes, ponds, glaciers > 1 km^{2} (0.386 sq mi or 247 acres) and river estuaries.

Esquelbecq (French pronunciation: [ɛskɛlbɛk]; from West Flemish: Ekelsbeke) is a commune in the Nord department in northern France.

Its southern limit with Ledringhem is chemin de Rubrouck.

== Population ==
Historical population
Year	Pop.	±% p.a.
1968	1,559	—
1975	1,592	+0.30%
1982	1,907	+2.61%
1990	1,979	+0.46%
1999	2,124	+0.79%
2007	2,206	+0.47%
2012	2,108	−0.90%
2017	2,115	+0.07%
2023	2,137	+0.17%
Source: INSEE

== History ==
In 1436, Wautier de Ghistelles was seigneur d'Ekelsbeke et de Ledringhem (Lord of Esquelbecq and Ledringhem) and governor of La Madeleine hospital in Bierne.

The Wormhoudt massacre was perpetrated near Esquelbecq on 80 British and French prisoners of war by Waffen-SS members at the time of the Dunkirk evacuation in 1940.

== Heraldry ==
Arms of Esquelbecq	The arms of Esquelbecq are blazoned : Or, a chevron azure between 3 mullets of 5 gules.
motto: vaincre ou mourir (win or die)

== Church and organ ==
The church on the village square is dedicated to Folcwin, who died at Esquelbecq in 855 CE. It is a hall church of the hallekerk type characteristic of the region, with three naves of equal length, width, and height. The interior and roof were destroyed by a fire in 1976, but the external appearance is still substantially as it was in 1610, with an attractive lozenge pattern in the brickwork.

The present church organ, by Marc Garnier (who also built an organ for the Elgar Concert Hall at the University of Birmingham), was built after the fire. It is modelled on the designs prevalent in Flanders in the 17th century and is "mesotonic" – tuned so that pieces from that era can be played in meantone temperament.

== Transportation ==
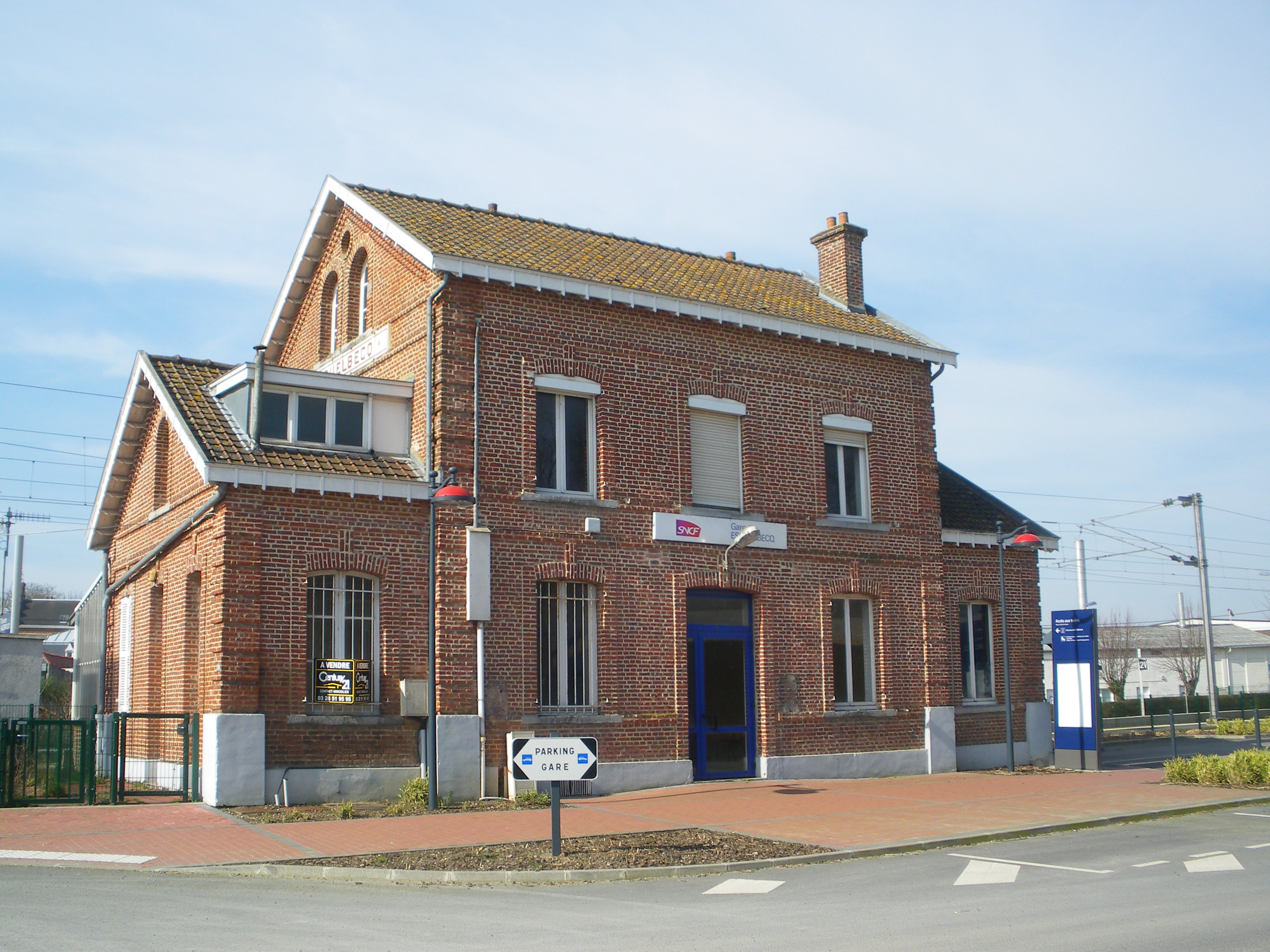
Esquelbecq train station

Esquelbecq is served by a railway station.

== See also ==
- Communes of the Nord department
