= Jacques Malbrancq =

Jacques Malbrancq or Malbrancque, also known as Jacobus Malbrancq or Jacobi Malbrancq (born circa 1579 in Saint-Omer - died in 1653 in Tournai, in what is now Belgium), Father, Audomarensis, e Societate Jesu, was a Jesuit priest in the Southern Netherlands, professor and preacher at Saint-Omer Jesuit college. He is known for his extensive work on the Morini, a gallic tribe.

== Works on the Morini ==
His book, De morinis et morinorum rebus, written in Latin, was published in Tournai, and contains three tomes.

- De Morinis et Morinorum rebus, sylvis, paludibus, oppidis, regia comitum prosapia ac territoriis, regioque praesulum splendore, viis caesareis ac portubus, caesarum domicilio, Audomareae fidei perennitate, templis, monasteriis, centum divorum sanctimonia. His accedunt notae non solùm Morinorum, sed aliarum etiam provinciarum, historicae antiquitati multam facem subministrantes. Deinde divorum … Ad extremum geminus index concionatoribus admodum utilis. Doornik, 1639, Adrianus Quinque
- De Morinis et Morinorum rebus, sylvis, paludibus in vicos et monasteria conversis, de regio monachorum et praesulum splendore, regia spretis connubiis sanctimonia, de horrenda per Nortmannos tectorum et hominum strage, vicis per comites in oppida moenita assurgentibus, de heroicis castellanorum facinoribus, cum illustrium miraculorum centuria. Hic plurimum sibi vendicant Germania, Italia, Hispania, Gallia, Anglia, Scotia, Lotharingia, Belgium universum. Doornik, 1647, Adrianus Quinque
- De Morinis et Morinorum infulis, Audomaraea, Yprensi, Bononica. De Bononicis solymae regibus, Anglicis ad Bononiam et Calesium monarchis, de Francica, Lusitana, Borbonensi, Burgundica, Lotharingica, Anglica, Turriaca, Blesensi, Aucitana, Arvernensi, Castellionensi, Briennensi, Krekia, Cuciaca, Genevensi, familijs apud Morinos pientissimis. De 20. Principum virorum Castellaniis … Tomus III. Pars I. Ab anno Christi M.XC.IV usque ad annum 1313. Doornik, 1654, Weduwe Adrianus Quinque
