= Nizhny Novgorod =

City in Nizhny Novgorod Oblast, Russia

Nizhny Novgorod Нижний Новгород
- City and administrative centre
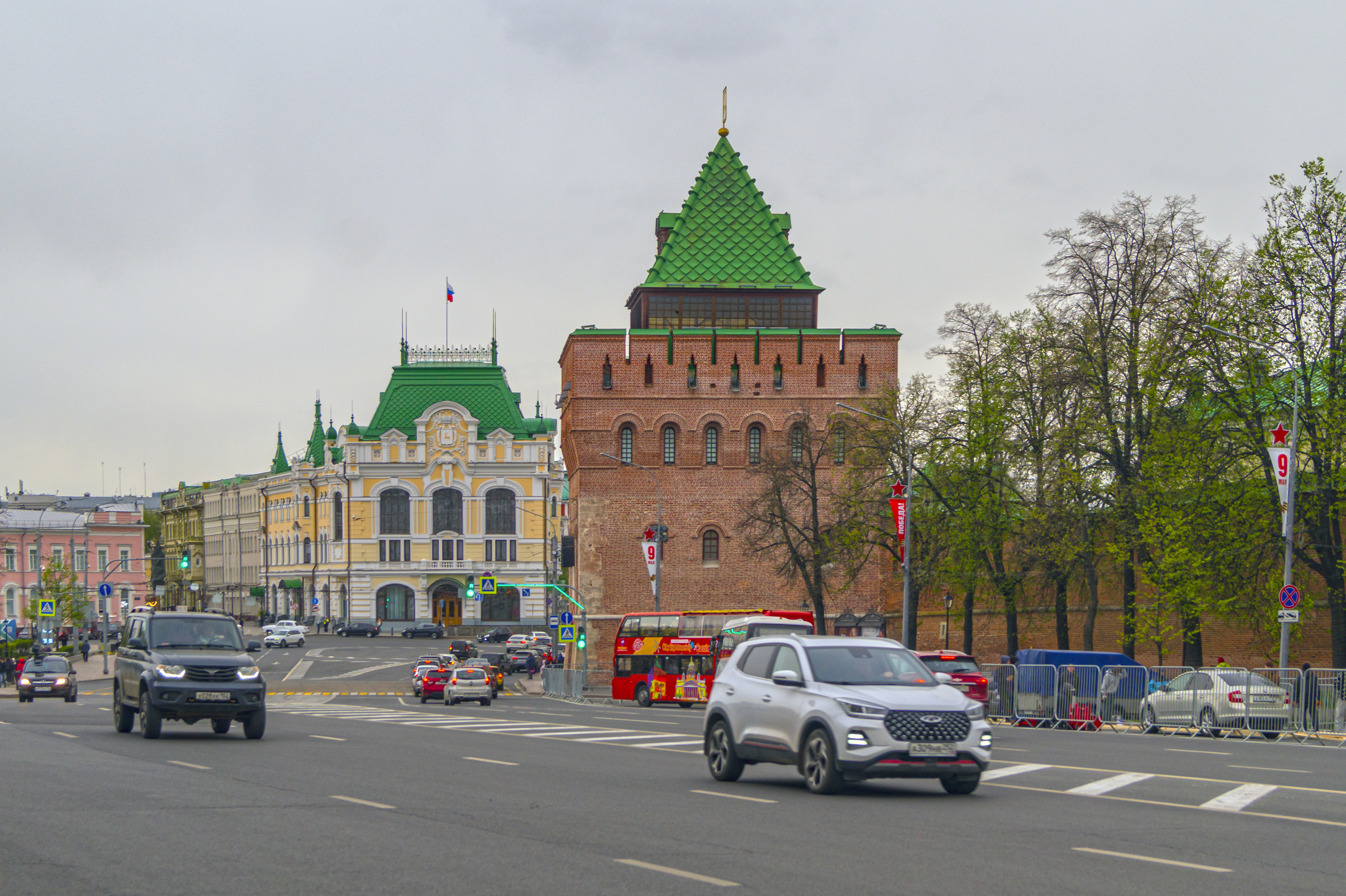
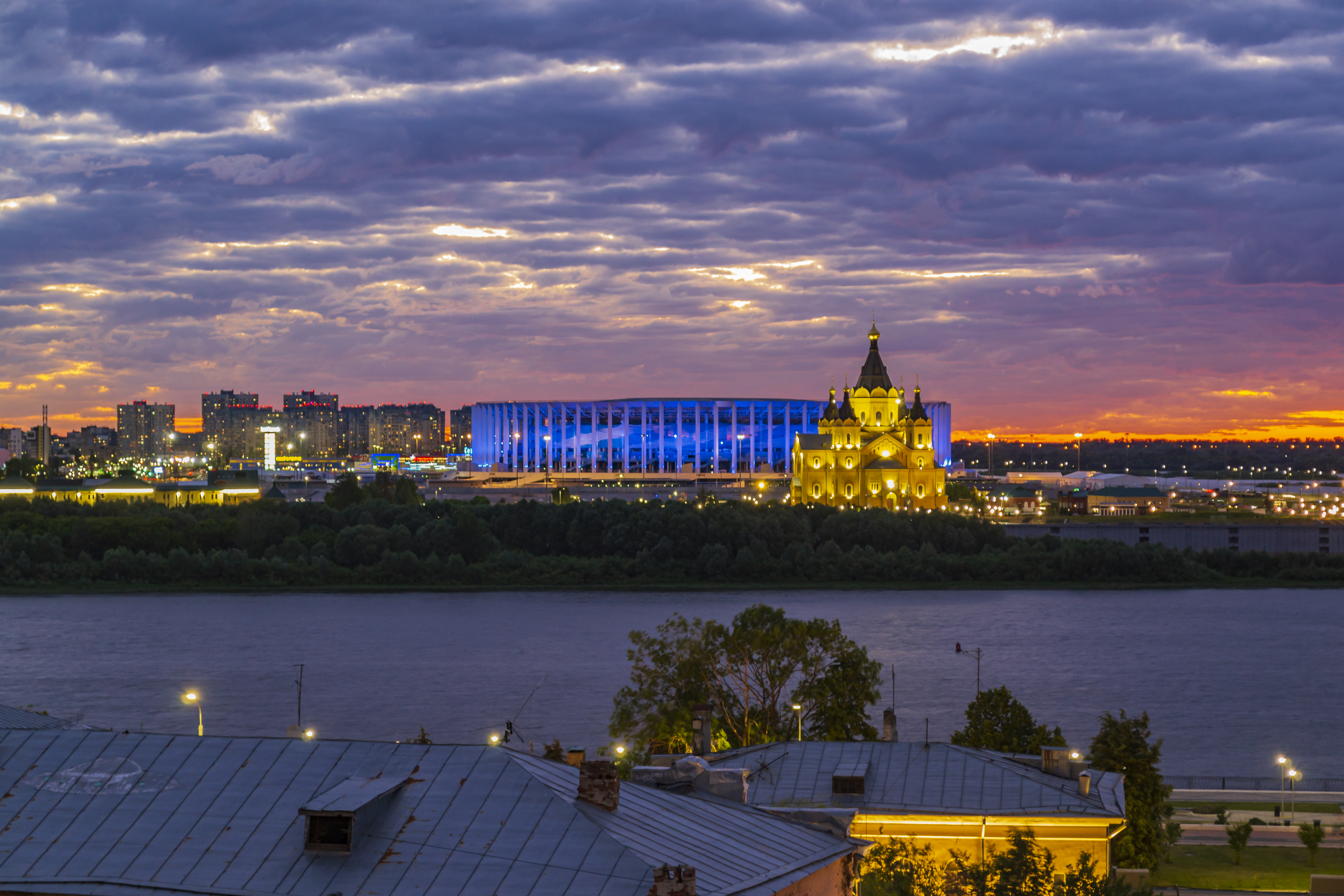
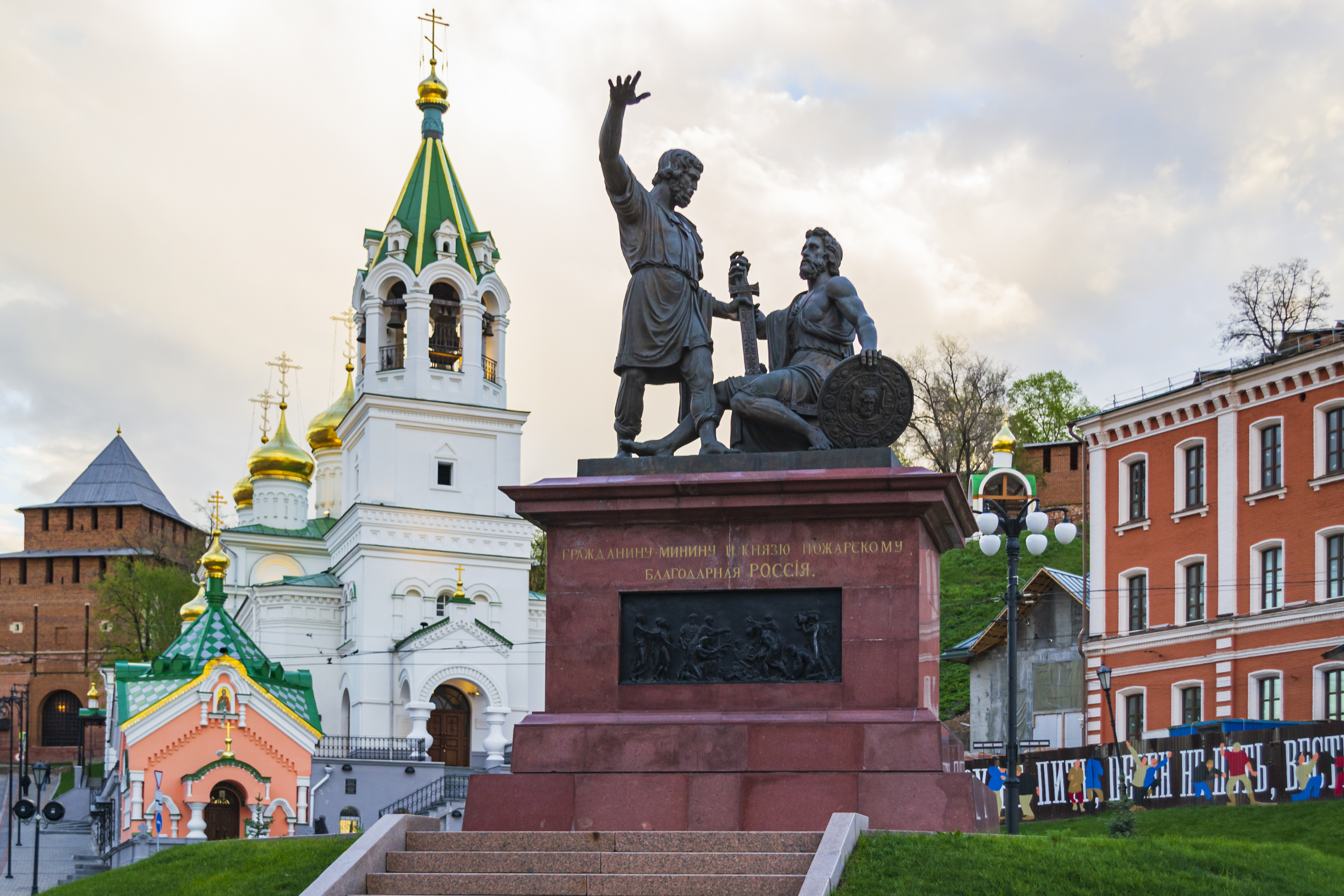
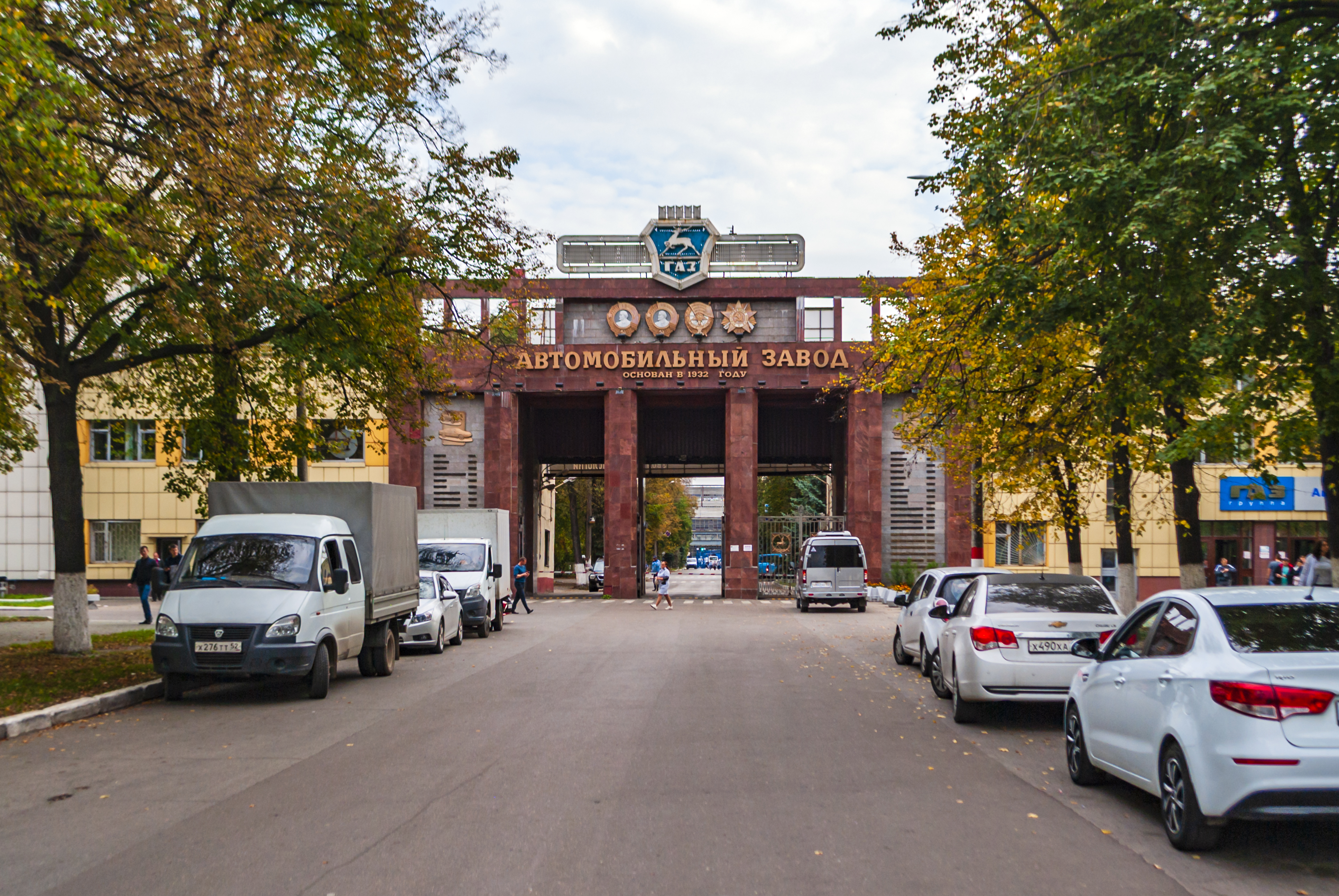
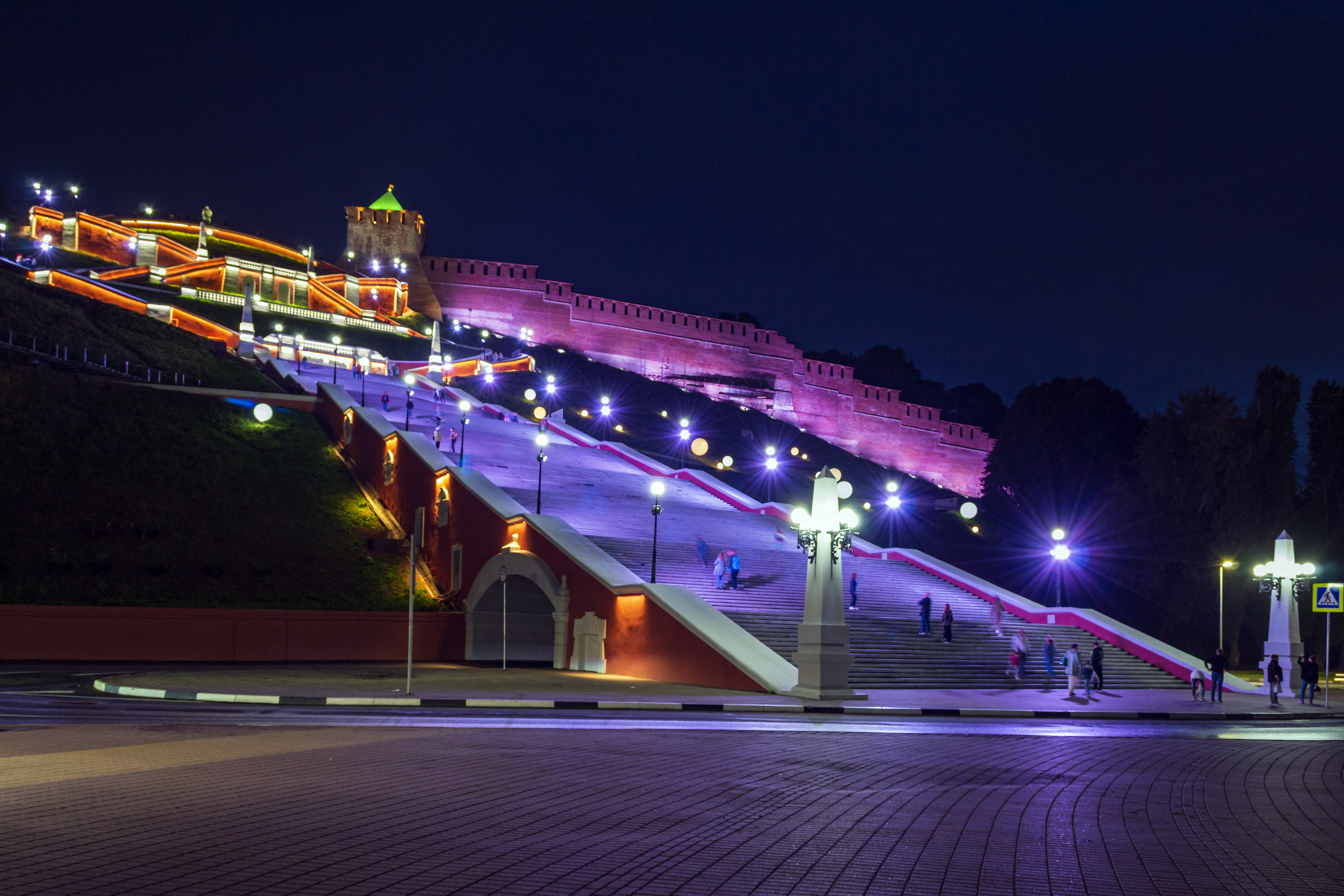
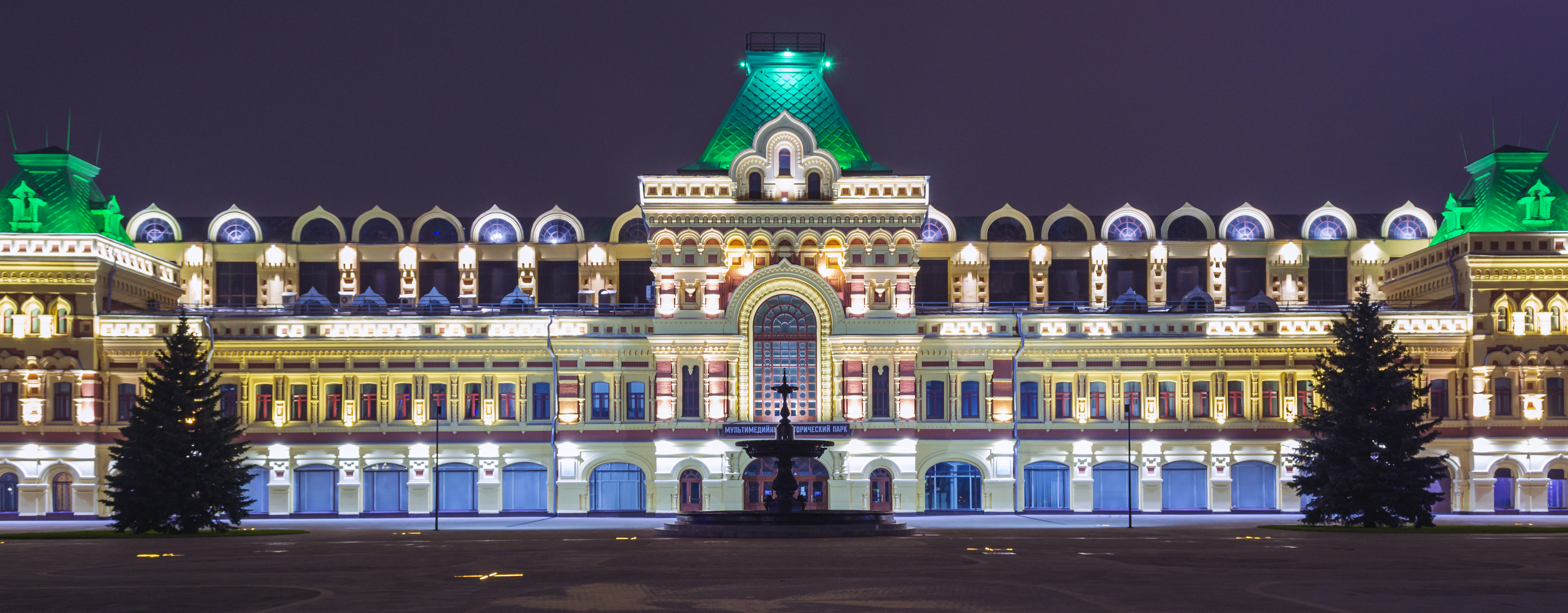
- Dmitrievskaya Tower of the Nizhny Novgorod Kremlin and Minin and Pozharsky Square Alexander Nevsky Cathedral and Nizhny Novgorod Stadium Minin and Pozharsky Monument GAZ Chkalov Stairs Nizhny Novgorod Fair

- Flag Coat of arms
- Interactive map of Nizhny Novgorod
- Location of Nizhny Novgorod Nizhny Novgorod (Nizhny Novgorod Oblast) Nizhny Novgorod (European Russia) Nizhny Novgorod (Europe)
- Coordinates: 56°19′37″N 44°00′27″E
- Country: Russia
- Federal subject: Nizhny Novgorod Oblast
- Founded: 1221
- City status since: 1221

Government
  - Body: City Duma
  - Mayor: Yury Shalabaev

Area
  - Total: 514.56 km^{2} (198.67 sq mi)
- Elevation: 200 m (660 ft)

Population (2010 Census)
  - Total: 1,250,619
  - Estimate (2025): 1,198,245 (−4.2%)
  - Rank: 5th in 2010
  - Density: 2,430.5/km^{2} (6,294.9/sq mi)
- Demonym: Nizhegorodian

Administrative status
  - Subordinated to: city of oblast significance of Nizhny Novgorod
  - Capital of: Volga Federal District
  - Capital of: Nizhny Novgorod Oblast, city of oblast significance of Nizhny Novgorod

Municipal status
  - Urban okrug: Nizhny Novgorod Urban Okrug
  - Capital of: Nizhny Novgorod Urban Okrug
- Time zone: UTC+3 (MSK)
- Postal code: 603000-603999
- Dialing code: +7 831
- OKTMO ID: 22701000001
- City Day: 3rd Saturday of August
- Website: admgor.nnov.ru

Nizhny Novgorod, (Note: /ˌnɪʒni ˈnɒvɡərɒd/ NIZH-nee NOV-gə-rod; Russian: Нижний Новгород, IPA: [ˈnʲiʐnʲɪj ˈnovɡərət], lit. 'Lower Newtown') colloquially shortened to Nizhny and from 1932 to 1990 known as Gorky, (Note: Russian: Горький, IPA: [ˈɡorʲkʲɪ]) is the administrative centre and largest city of Nizhny Novgorod Oblast, and the administrative centre of the Volga Federal District in Russia. The city is located at the confluence of the Oka and the Volga rivers in Central Russia, with a population of over 1.2 million residents, and roughly 1.7 million residents in the wider urban area. Nizhny Novgorod is the sixth-largest city in Russia, and the second-most populous city on the Volga and in the Volga Federal District, and is located 420 kilometers (260 mi) east of Moscow. It is an important economic, architectural, educational and cultural centre in Russia and the Volga-Vyatka Economic Region, and provides the majority of Russia's river tourism.

The city was founded on 4 February 1221 by Prince George II of Vladimir. In 1612, Kuzma Minin and Prince Dmitry Pozharsky organized an army for the liberation of Moscow from the Poles and Lithuanians. In 1817, Nizhny Novgorod became a great trade centre of the Russian Empire. In 1896, at the trade centre, an All-Russia Exhibition was organized. During the Soviet period, the city turned into an important industrial centre, and was known as Gorky. In particular, the Gorky Automobile Plant was constructed in this period. Around this time, the city was given the nickname "Russian Detroit". Shortly before the dissolution of the Soviet Union, the city was renamed Nizhny Novgorod once again. In 1985, the Nizhny Novgorod Metro was opened. In 2016, Vladimir Putin opened the new 70th Anniversary of Victory Plant, which is part of the Almaz-Antey Air and Space Defence Corporation.

The Kremlin – the historic centre of the city – contains the main government agencies of the city and the Volga Federal District. The demonym for a Nizhny Novgorod resident is нижегородец (nizhegorodets) for men or нижегородка (nizhegorodka) for women, rendered in English as Nizhegorodian. Novgorodian is improper, as it refers to a resident of Veliky Novgorod. Nizhny Novgorod was one of the host cities of the 2018 FIFA World Cup.

== Name ==
Originally, the name was just Novgorod ('Newtown'), but to distinguish it from the other, older and well-known Novgorod (Veliky Novgorod) to the west, the city was commonly called Novgorod of the Lower Lands, or Lower Newtown. The city and surrounding land is called lower (nizhniy; нижний), even though it is actually higher in altitude than Veliky Novgorod, because it is situated downstream of other Russian cities such as Moscow, Vladimir and Murom.

From 1932 to 1990, the city was known as Gorky (Горький, [ˈɡorʲkʲɪj]), in honour of author Maxim Gorky, who was born there.

== History ==
=== Seat of medieval princes ===
The city traces its origin from a small Russian wooden hillfort that was founded by grand prince Yuri II of Vladimir in 1221 at the confluence of two of the most important rivers in his principality, the Volga and Oka rivers. It was the easternmost Russian settlement until the founding of Kurmysh by Boris Konstantinovich in 1372. However, Russian expansion eastward was delayed until the capture of Kazan in 1552, after which the Russian fortress of Alatyr was established.

The independent existence of the medieval fort was threatened by the continuous Mordvin attacks against it; the major attempt made by forces under Purgaz in April 1229 was repulsed. After the death of Yuri II on 4 March 1238 at the Battle of the Sit River, the Mongols occupied the fortress. Later a major stronghold for border protection, the fortress of Nizhny Novgorod took advantage of a natural moat formed by the two rivers.

Along with Moscow and Tver, Nizhny Novgorod was among several newly founded towns that escaped devastation during the Mongol invasion of Kievan Rus' on account of their insignificance, but grew into great centres in Russian political life during the hegemony of the Golden Horde. With the agreement of the Khan, Nizhny Novgorod was incorporated into the Vladimir-Suzdal Principality in 1264. After 86 years its importance further increased when the seat of the powerful Suzdal Principality was moved there from Gorodets in 1350. Grand Duke Dmitry Konstantinovich (1323–1383) sought to make his capital a rival worthy of Moscow; he built a stone citadel and several churches and was a patron of historians. The earliest extant manuscript of the Primary Chronicle – the Laurentian Codex – was written for him by the local monk Laurentius in 1377.

=== Fortress city ===
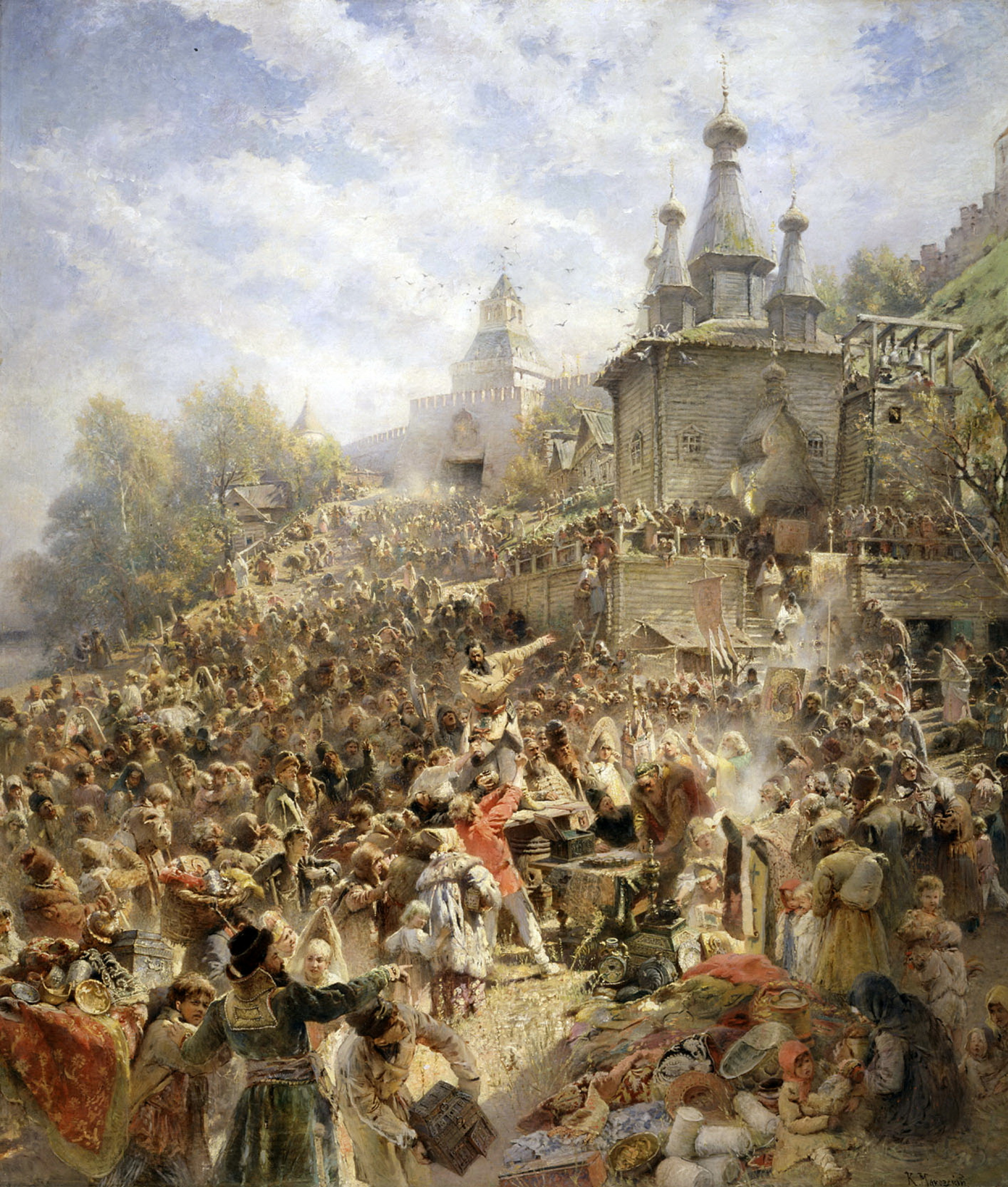
Kuzma Minin appeals to the people of Nizhny Novgorod to raise a volunteer army against the Poles (painting by Konstantin Makovsky, 1896).

After the city's incorporation into the Grand Principality of Moscow in 1392, the local princes took the name Shuysky and settled in Moscow, where they were prominent at the court and briefly ascended the throne in the person of Vasily I of Moscow. After being burnt by the powerful Crimean Tatar chief Edigu in 1408, Nizhny Novgorod was restored and regarded by the Muscovites primarily as a great stronghold in their wars against the Tatars of Kazan. The enormous red-brick Kremlin, one of the strongest and earliest preserved citadels in Russia, was built in 1508–1511 under the supervision of Pietro Francesco. The fortress was strong enough to withstand Tatar sieges in 1520 and 1536.

In 1612, the so-called "national militia", gathered by a local merchant, Kuzma Minin, and commanded by Knyaz Dmitry Pozharsky expelled the Polish troops from Moscow, thus putting an end to the Time of Troubles and establishing the rule of the Romanov dynasty. The main square in front of the Kremlin is named after Minin and Pozharsky, although it is locally known simply as Minin Square. Minin's remains are buried in the citadel. In commemoration of these events, on 21 October 2005, an exact copy of the Red Square statue of Minin and Pozharsky was placed in front of St John the Baptist Church, which is believed to be the place from where the call to the people had been proclaimed.

In the course of the following century, the city prospered commercially and was chosen by the Stroganovs, the wealthiest merchant family of Russia, as a base for their operations. A particular style of architecture and icon painting, known as the Stroganov school, developed there at the turn of the 17th and 18th centuries.

The historical coat of arms of Nizhny Novgorod in 1781 was a red deer with black horns and hooves on a white field. The modern coat of arms from 2006 is the same, with a ribbon of order of Lenin and gold crown from above.

=== Commercial centre ===
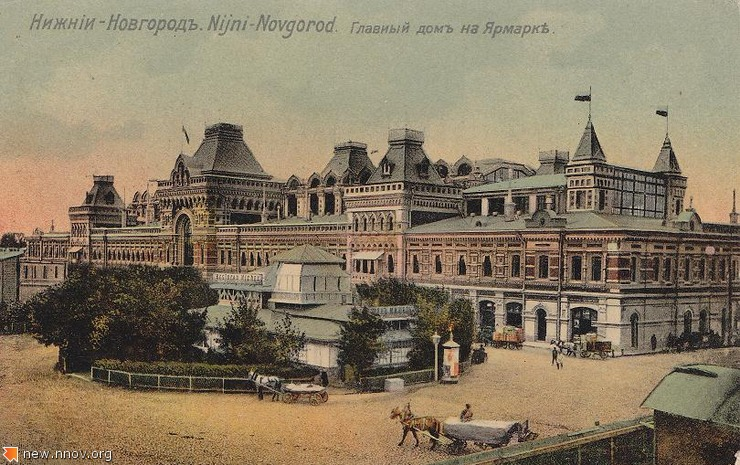
Main building of the Great Russian Fair, 19th-century postcard

In 1817, the Makaryev Fair, one of the liveliest in the world, was transferred to Nizhny Novgorod and started to attract millions of visitors annually. By the mid-19th century, the city was firmly established as the trade capital of the Russian Empire. The world's first radio receiver by engineer Alexander Popov and the world's first hyperboloid tower and lattice shell-coverings by engineer Vladimir Shukhov were demonstrated at the All-Russia industrial and art exhibition in Nizhny Novgorod in 1896. According to official Imperial Russian statistics, the population of Nizhny Novgorod as of 14 January 1913 was 97,000.

The largest industrial enterprise was the Sormovo Iron Works which was connected by the company's own railway to Moskovsky railway station in the Lower City of Nizhny Novgorod. The Kazansky railway station was in the Upper city. Other industries gradually developed, and by the start of the 20th century, the city was also a first-rank industrial hub. Henry Ford helped build a large truck and tractor plant (GAZ) in the late 1920s, sending engineers and mechanics, including future labour leader Walter Reuther.

=== Soviet era ===
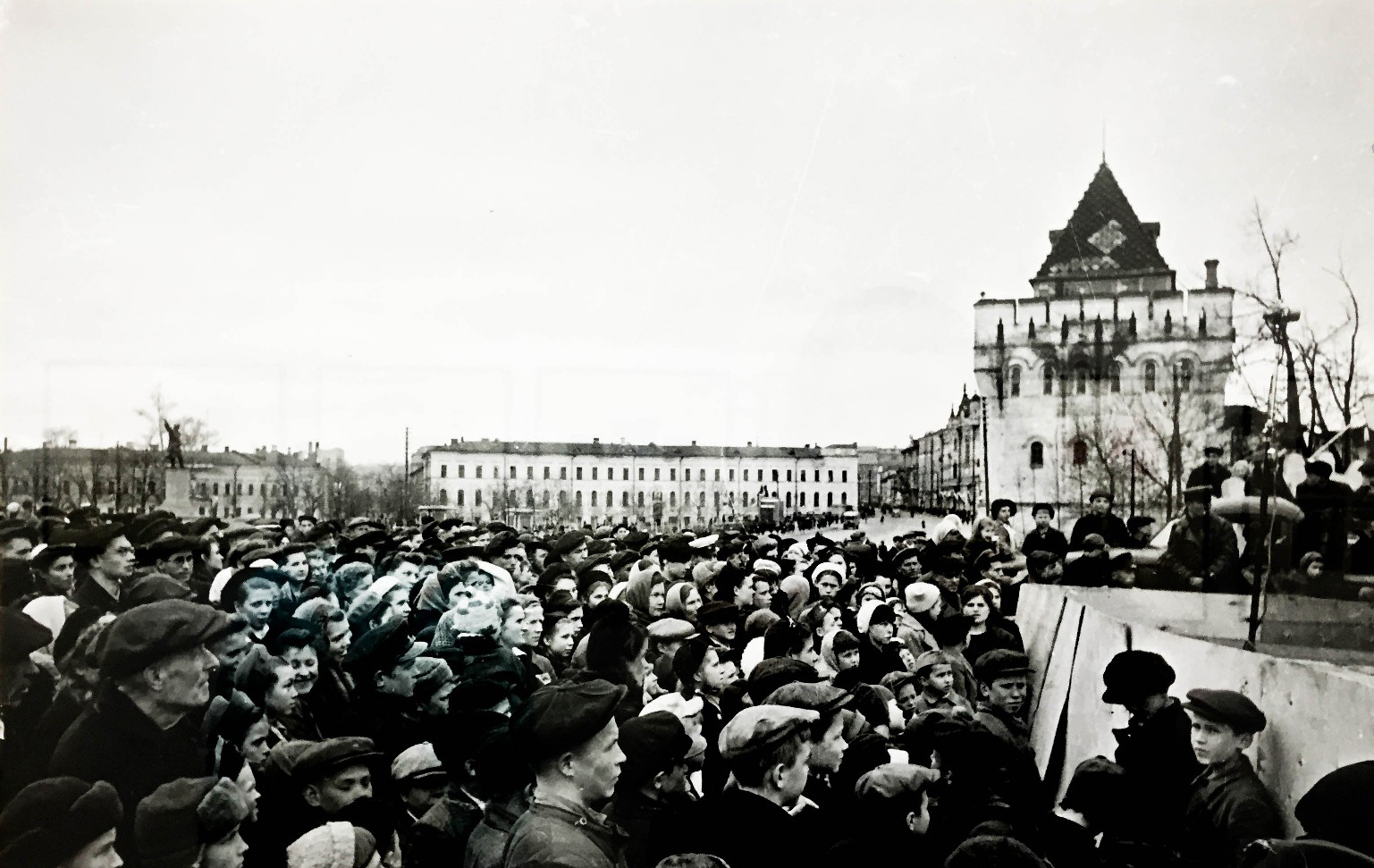
Victory Day on the Minin and Pozharsky Square, 9 May 1945

There are four monuments to those executed in the city between 1918 and 1945: two mark sites where victims were killed and buried during the Russian Civil War, at the Pochainsky and Gendarmes Ravines. The others mark sites in the city at the Bugrovskoe and the Marina Roshcha cemeteries, where those executed or who died in prison were buried.

There were no permanent bridges over the Volga or Oka before the October Revolution in 1917. Temporary bridges were built during the trade fair. The first bridge over the Volga was started by the Moscow–Kazan Railway Company in 1914, but only finished in the Soviet Era when the railway to Kotelnich was opened for service in 1927.

The Marxist activist and Tsarist dissident Maxim Gorky was born in Nizhny Novgorod in 1868 as Alexey Maximovich Peshkov. In his novels he described the dismal life of the city proletariat. When he returned to the Soviet Union in 1932 on the invitation of Joseph Stalin, the city was renamed Gorky. The city bore Gorky's name until 1990. His childhood home is preserved as a museum, known as the Kashirin House, after Alexey's grandfather who owned the place.

During World War II, from 1941 to 1943, Gorky was subjected to air raids and bombardments by Germany. The Germans tried to destroy the city industry because it was a major supplier of military equipment to the front. Of the attacks made in the rear of the Soviet Union, these became the most powerful in the entire duration of the war.

During much of the Soviet era, the city was closed to foreigners to safeguard the security of Soviet military research and production facilities, even though it was a popular stopping point for Soviet tourists travelling up and down the Volga in tourist boats. Unusually for a Soviet city of that size, even street maps were not available for sale until the mid-1970s. In 1970, by the Decree of the Presidium of the Supreme Soviet of the USSR, the city was awarded the Order of Lenin. Mátyás Rákosi, the former Stalinist General Secretary of Hungary's communist party, died in exile there in 1971. On 20 November 1985, in the city the first section of the metro was launched. The physicist and Nobel Peace Prize laureate Andrei Sakharov was exiled there during 1980–1986 to limit his contacts with foreigners. An end to the "closed" status of the city accompanied the reinstatement of the city's original name in 1990.

=== Post-Soviet era ===
The 800th anniversary of Nizhny Novgorod was celebrated on 21 August 2021. It celebrated the history and the great people who came from the city. The climax of the celebration was the city's 800th Anniversary Gala Show. Natalia Vodianova gave a speech and Vladimir Putin was in attendance. The Central Bank of Russia issued commemorative coins to honor the 800th anniversary.

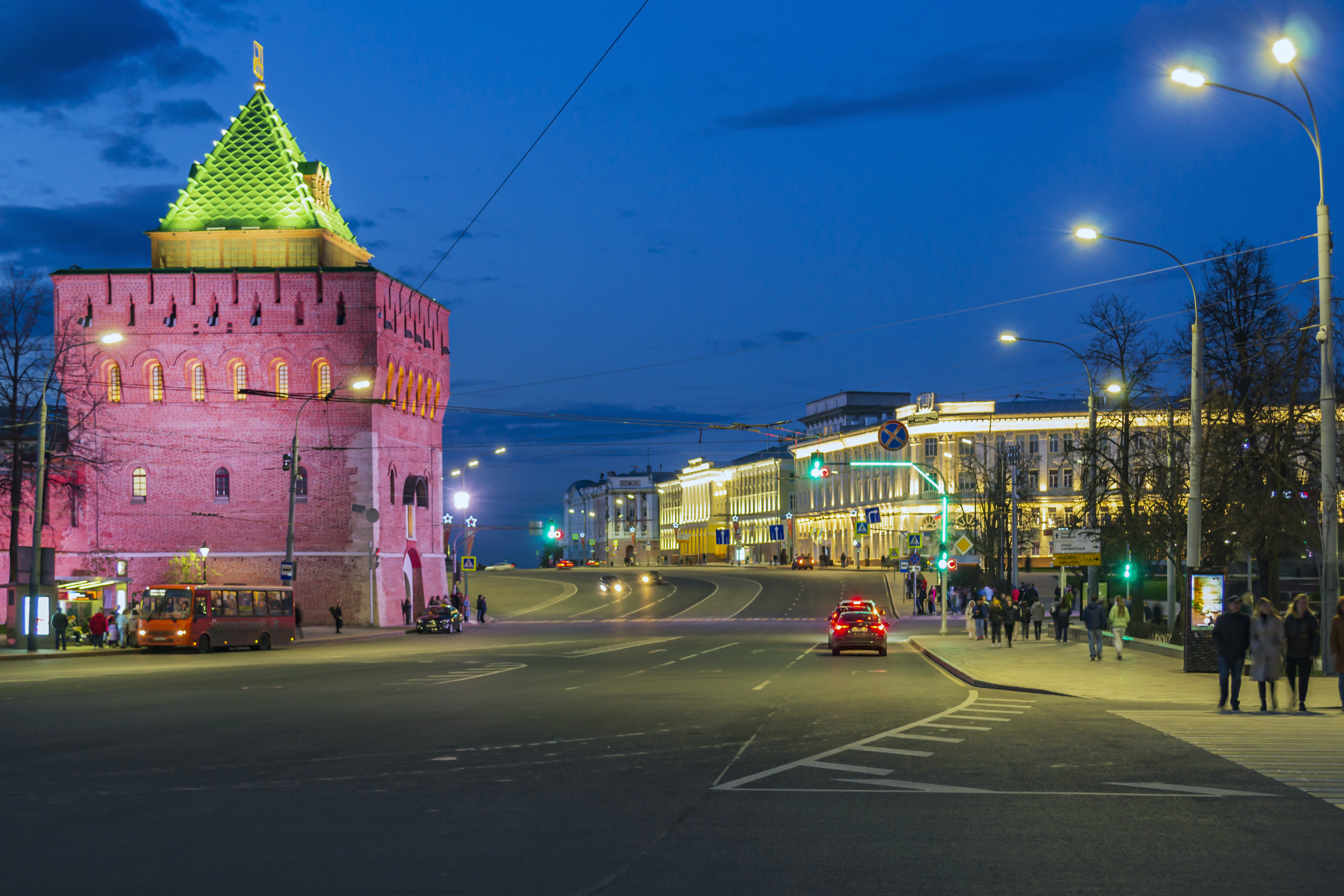
Minin and Pozharsky Square

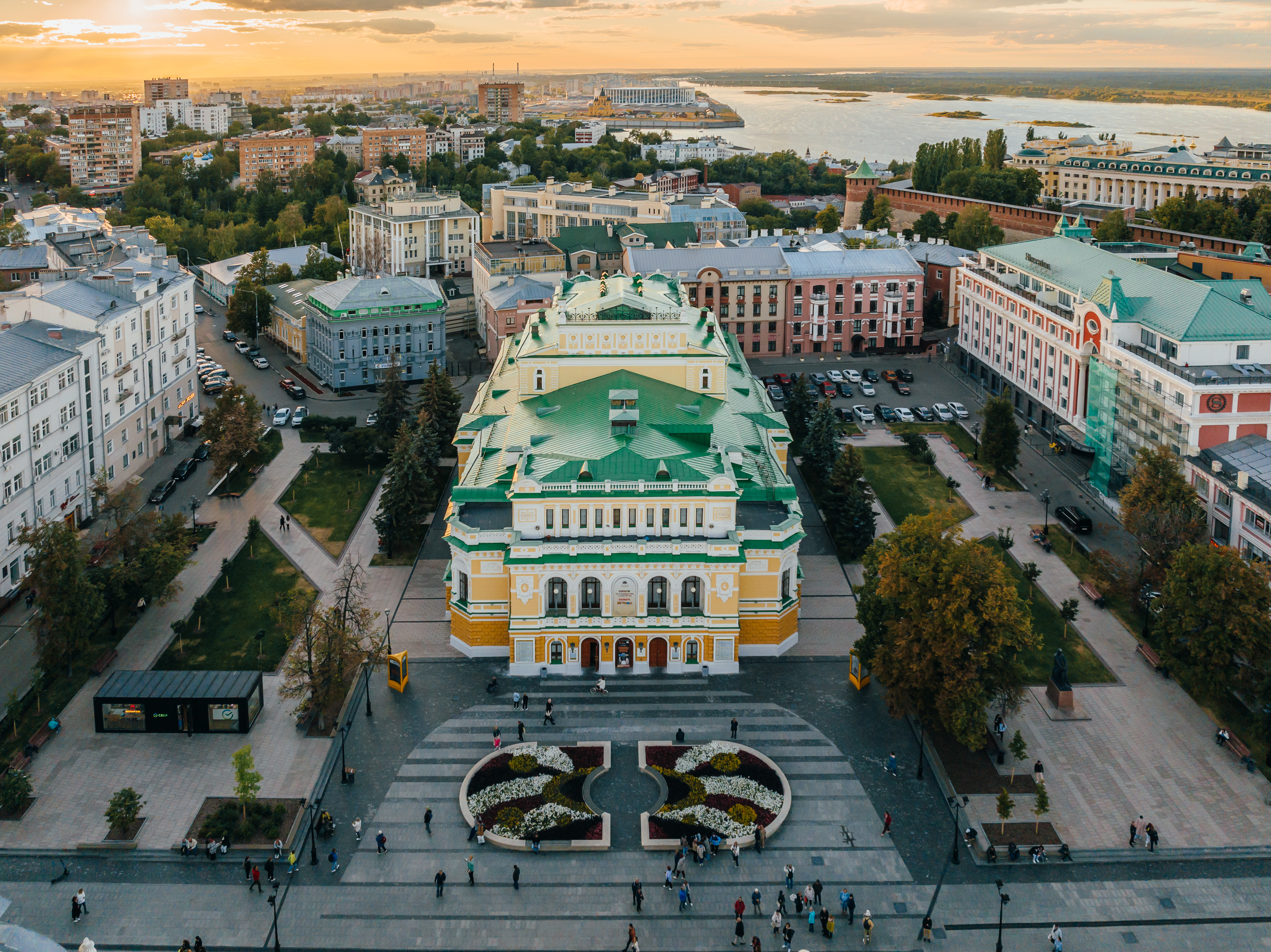
M. Gorky Drama Theatre

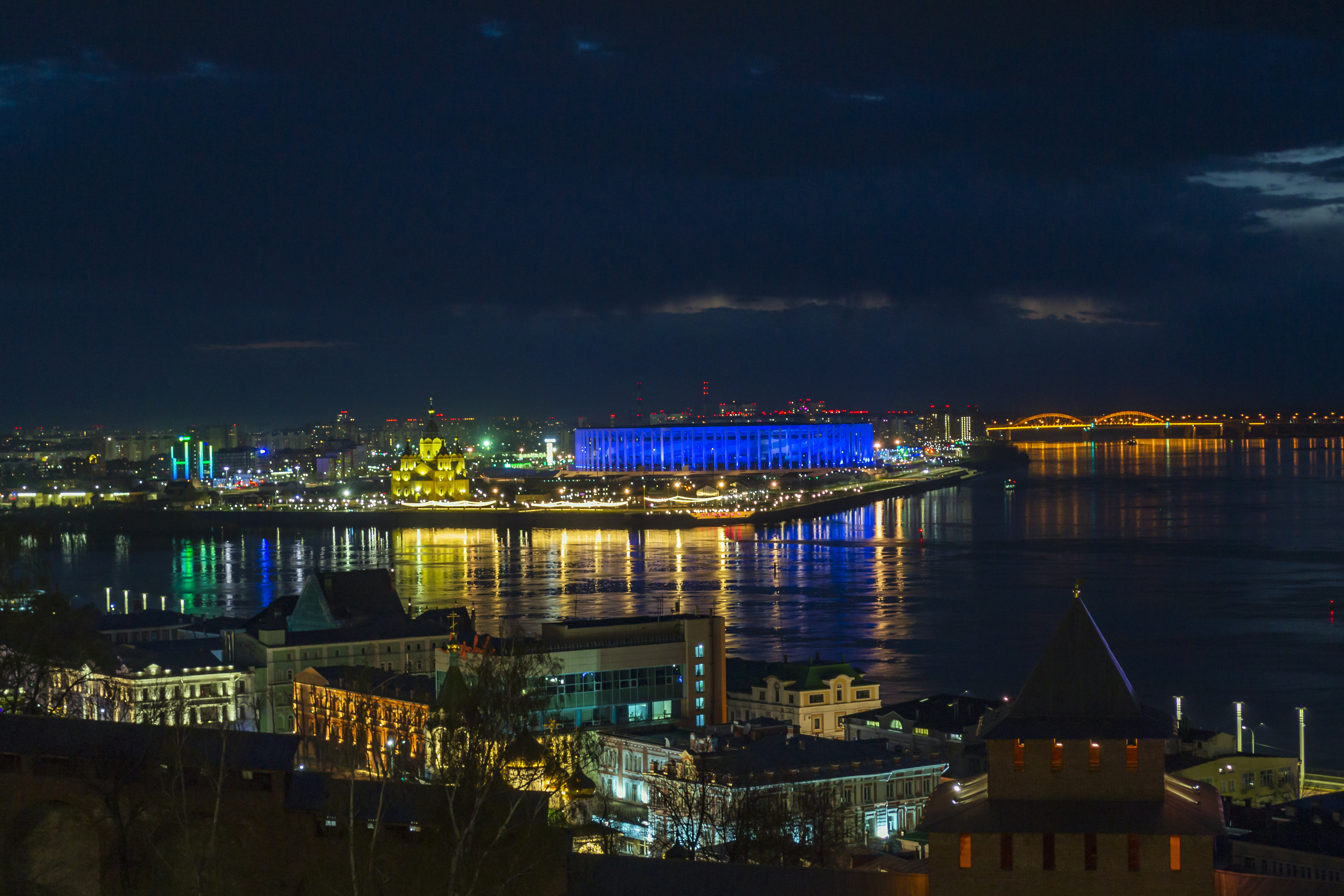
The Spit (confluence of Oka and Volga Rivers)

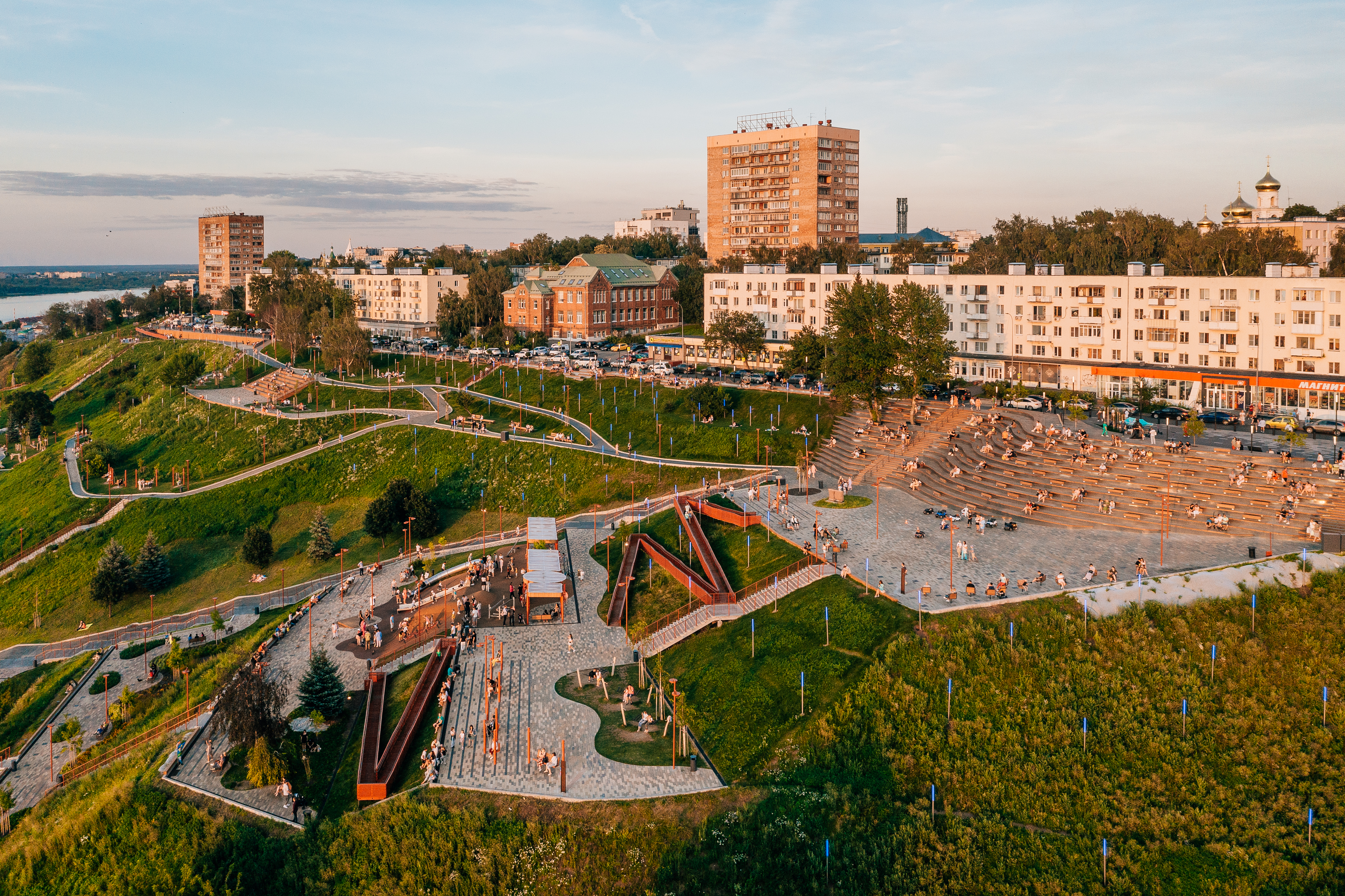
Fedorovsky embankment

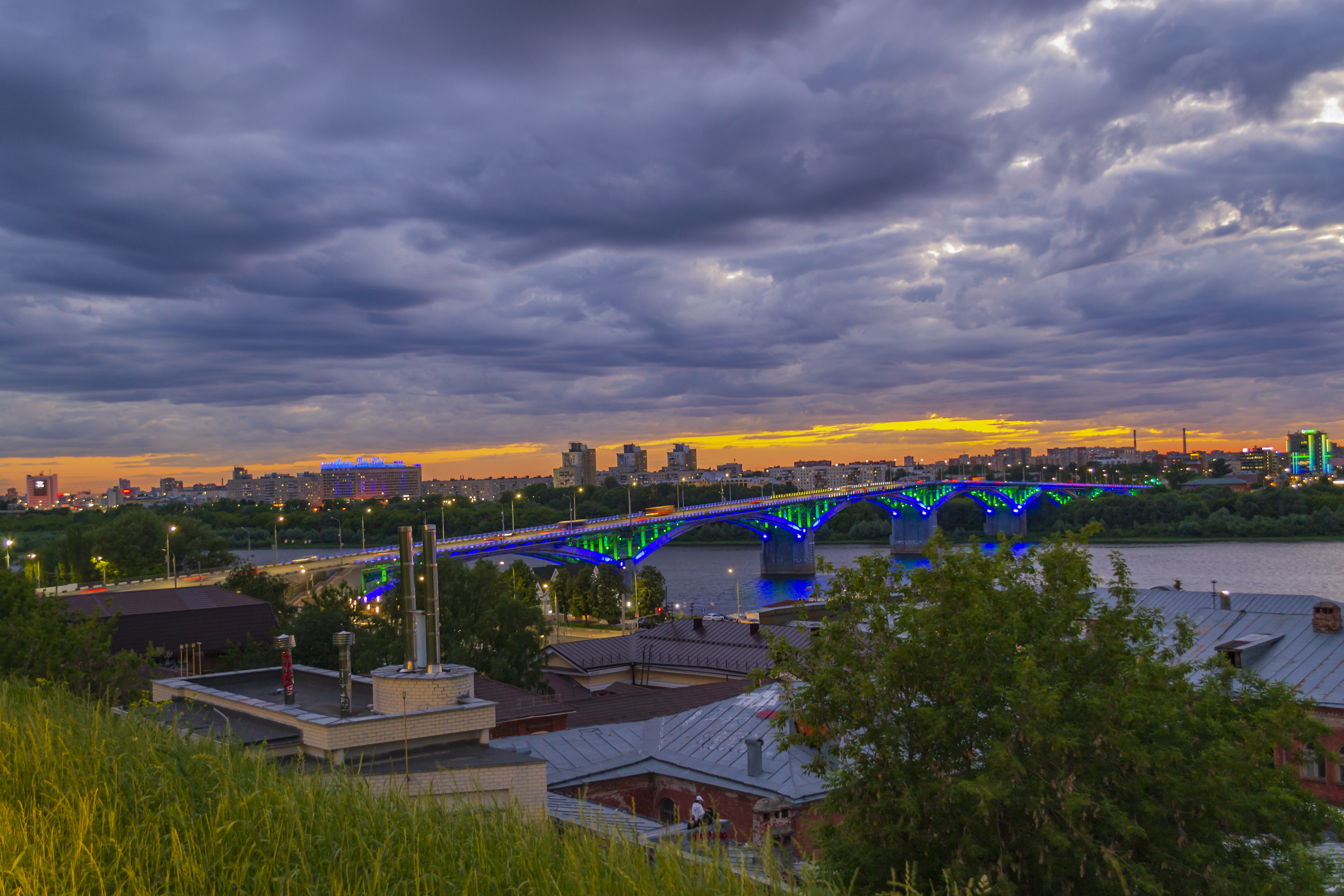
Kanavino Bridge

== Administrative and municipal status ==
Nizhny Novgorod is the administrative centre (capital) of Volga Federal District and Nizhny Novgorod Oblast. Within the framework of administrative divisions, it is, together with one resort settlement and twelve rural localities, incorporated as the city of oblast significance of Nizhny Novgorod—an administrative unit with the status equal to that of the districts. As a municipal division, the city of oblast significance of Nizhny Novgorod is incorporated as Nizhny Novgorod Urban Okrug. In December 2011, Marat Safin was elected to the Russian Parliament as a member of Vladimir Putin's United Russia Party, representing Nizhny Novgorod.

== City layout and divisions ==
Administrative divisions of Nizhny Novgorod

Nizhny Novgorod is divided by the Oka River into two distinct parts. The Upper City (Russian: Нагорная часть, Nagornaya chast, Mountainous part) is located on the hilly eastern (right) bank of the Oka. It includes three of the eight city districts into which the city is administratively divided:

1. Nizhegorodsky (the Kremlin, the historical and administrative centre of the city);
2. Prioksky
3. Sovetsky

The Lower City (Russian: Заречная часть, Zarechnaya chast, Over river part) occupies the low (western) side of the Oka, and includes five city districts:

1. Avtozavodsky (built around the Gorky Automobile Plant);
2. Kanavinsky (the site of the Nizhny Novgorod Fair and the location of the main train station);
3. Leninsky.
4. Moskovsky (home of the Sokol Aircraft Plant and its airfield);
5. Sormovsky (where Krasnoye Sormovo and the Volga Shipyard are located);

All of today's lower city was annexed by Nizhny Novgorod in 1929–1931.

== Demographics ==
Historical population
Year	Pop.	±%
1897	90,000	—
1926	221,544	+146.2%
1939	643,689	+190.5%
1959	941,962	+46.3%
1970	1,170,133	+24.2%
1979	1,344,474	+14.9%
1989	1,438,133	+7.0%
2002	1,311,252	−8.8%
2010	1,250,619	−4.6%
2021	1,228,199	−1.8%
Source: Census data

- Population: 1,228,199 (2021 census); 1,250,619 (2010 census); 1,311,252 (2002 census); 1,438,133 (1989 Soviet census).
- Births (2009): 12,934
- Deaths (2009): 20,987

Nizhny Novgorod has a population of 1,228,199 within city limits and two million in the urban agglomeration, making it the sixth-largest city in Russia, ranking after Moscow, Saint Petersburg, Novosibirsk, Yekaterinburg and Kazan. Russians make up 94.8% of the city's population. Among the remainder are Tatars, Armenians, Azerbaijanis, Ukrainians, Uzbeks, Jews and others.

== Geography ==
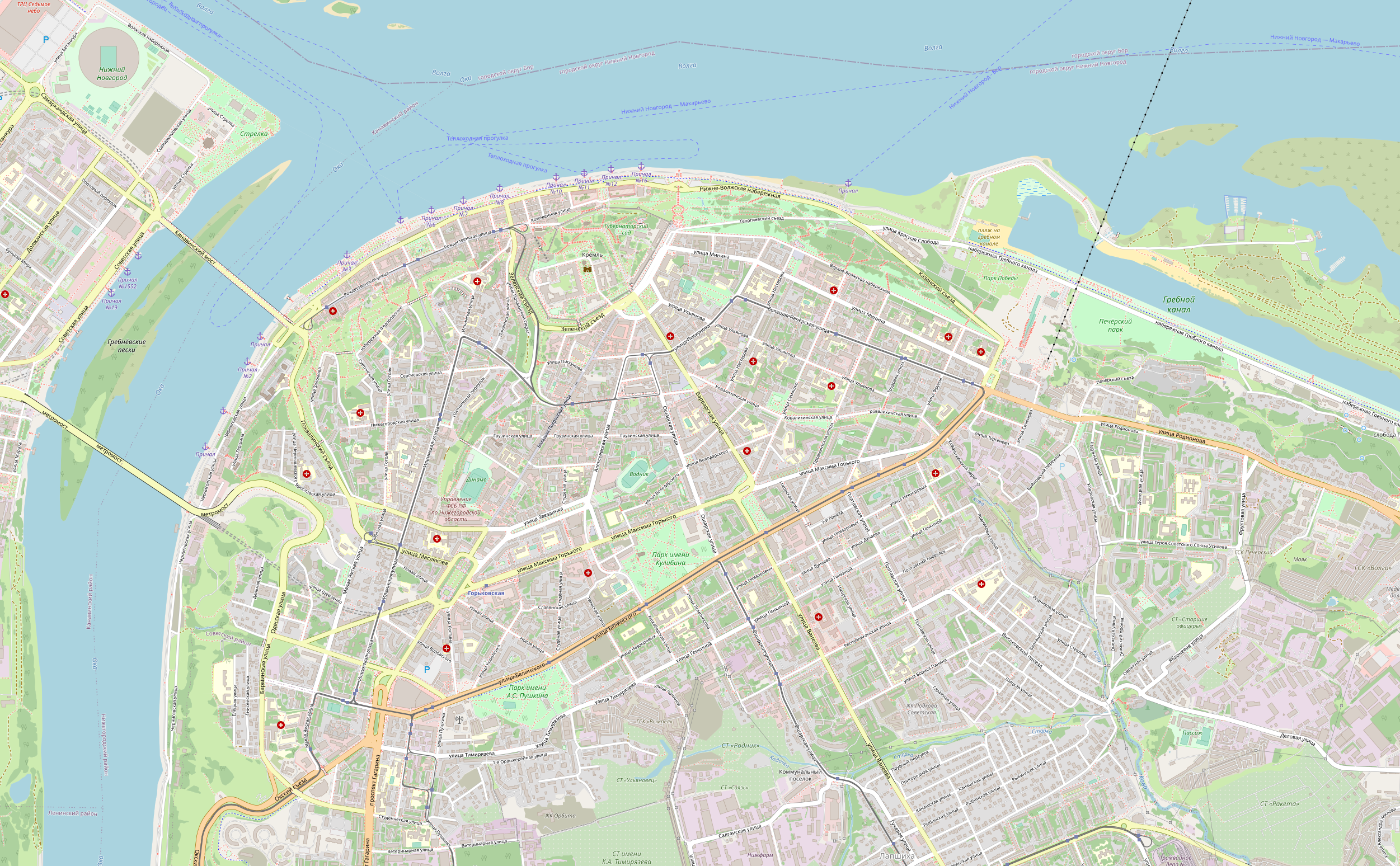
Historical centre of the city

=== Time ===
The area operates in what is referred to in international standards as Moscow Standard Time (MSK), which is 3 hours ahead of UTC, or UTC+3. Daylight saving time is no longer observed.

=== Climate ===
In 1834, the first weather station was opened in Nizhny Novgorod. A century later it transformed into Gorky Hydrometeorological service; since 1978, it has been known as the Higher Volga hydrometeorology and natural habitat control department.

The climate in the region is continental, specifically humid continental (Dfb), and it is similar to the climate in Moscow, although colder in winter, which lasts from late November until late March with a permanent snow cover. Average temperatures range from +19 °C (66 °F) in July to −9 °C (16 °F) in January. Average annual temperature is +4.8 °C (40.6 °F), wind speed 2.8 m/s, air humidity 76%. Being far enough away from the Baltic Sea for maritime effects to lower, Nizhny Novgorod has similar winters to Bothnian Bay climates near the Arctic Circle, but instead has very warm summers for its latitude.

Nizhny receives on average 1,775 hours of sunshine a year. The maximum duration of daylight is in June (17 hours 44 minutes), and the minimum in December (6 hours 52 minutes). Overcast is often reported in winter: 75% to 80% of the time the sky is covered in clouds, while it's only 49 to 56% in April through to August. In autumn and winter, the overcast is usually in the mornings, then the sky clears in the afternoon. In spring and summer, on the contrary, it is clear in the mornings, while towards midday clouds cluster ('cumulus cloud'), and disappear towards the evening.

In spring, temperatures set above zero around 5 April and stay until the end of October. On average precipitation comes at 653 mm per year, mostly in July and least of all in March. Generally, 180 days out of 365 enjoy some form of precipitation. Snow first comes in October but the blanket of snow insulates the ground at November-end and melts mid-April. As a rule, the air temperature in winter ranges from −10 °C (14 °F) to −20 °C (−4 °F). A storm rarely takes place in winter here (a few dates to mention are 27 November 1940, 30 November 1951, 14 February 1960, and 3 December 1962). In spring there's less precipitation than in other seasons. Spring flies by as snow melts in the second half of March and is normally gone by the end of April. Summer comes at the beginning of June, when the temperature sets around +15. Maximum heat can be observed towards the third decade of July. Average temperatures range from +15 °C (59 °F) to +20 °C (68 °F). A maximum temperature of +38.2 °C (100.8 °F) was recorded during the 2010 Northern Hemisphere summer heat waves. Summer rain is short but intense, with strong wind. In September, temperature starts to drop and gets below +10 °C (50 °F) in the mid-20s of the month. It rains often and heavily in autumn, and the sky is overcast.

Climate data for Nizhny Novgorod (1991–2020, extremes 1835–present)
Month	Jan	Feb	Mar	Apr	May	Jun	Jul	Aug	Sep	Oct	Nov	Dec	Year
Record high °C (°F)	5.7 (42.3)	7.2 (45.0)	17.3 (63.1)	26.3 (79.3)	32.5 (90.5)	36.3 (97.3)	38.2 (100.8)	38.0 (100.4)	31.0 (87.8)	24.2 (75.6)	15.9 (60.6)	8.5 (47.3)	38.2 (100.8)
Mean daily maximum °C (°F)	−5.9 (21.4)	−4.8 (23.4)	1.5 (34.7)	11.0 (51.8)	19.3 (66.7)	22.7 (72.9)	24.9 (76.8)	22.6 (72.7)	16.2 (61.2)	8.3 (46.9)	0.1 (32.2)	−4.3 (24.3)	9.3 (48.7)
Daily mean °C (°F)	−8.6 (16.5)	−8.0 (17.6)	−2.2 (28.0)	6.1 (43.0)	13.5 (56.3)	17.3 (63.1)	19.7 (67.5)	17.4 (63.3)	11.7 (53.1)	5.0 (41.0)	−2.1 (28.2)	−6.7 (19.9)	5.3 (41.5)
Mean daily minimum °C (°F)	−11.1 (12.0)	−10.7 (12.7)	−5.2 (22.6)	2.2 (36.0)	8.6 (47.5)	12.6 (54.7)	15.1 (59.2)	13.2 (55.8)	8.3 (46.9)	2.5 (36.5)	−4.0 (24.8)	−8.9 (16.0)	1.9 (35.4)
Record low °C (°F)	−41.2 (−42.2)	−37.2 (−35.0)	−28.3 (−18.9)	−19.7 (−3.5)	−6.9 (19.6)	−1.8 (28.8)	5.1 (41.2)	0.9 (33.6)	−5.5 (22.1)	−16.0 (3.2)	−30.9 (−23.6)	−41.4 (−42.5)	−41.4 (−42.5)
Average precipitation mm (inches)	50 (2.0)	40 (1.6)	40 (1.6)	40 (1.6)	42 (1.7)	73 (2.9)	75 (3.0)	68 (2.7)	59 (2.3)	67 (2.6)	52 (2.0)	59 (2.3)	665 (26.2)
Average extreme snow depth cm (inches)	31 (12)	43 (17)	40 (16)	5 (2.0)	0 (0)	0 (0)	0 (0)	0 (0)	0 (0)	1 (0.4)	6 (2.4)	16 (6.3)	43 (17)
Average rainy days	5	4	5	13	17	19	18	18	18	18	10	6	151
Average snowy days	28	24	18	7	1	0.1	0	0	1	8	20	26	133
Average relative humidity (%)	86	81	74	64	60	69	70	74	79	82	87	86	76
Mean monthly sunshine hours	37.6	74.7	152.7	217.0	294.6	307.0	317.1	261.3	158.7	84.7	39.5	23.4	1,968.3
Source 1: Pogoda.ru.net
Source 2: NOAA

== Government and politics ==
Nizhny Novgorod constituency for the State Duma.

=== Government ===
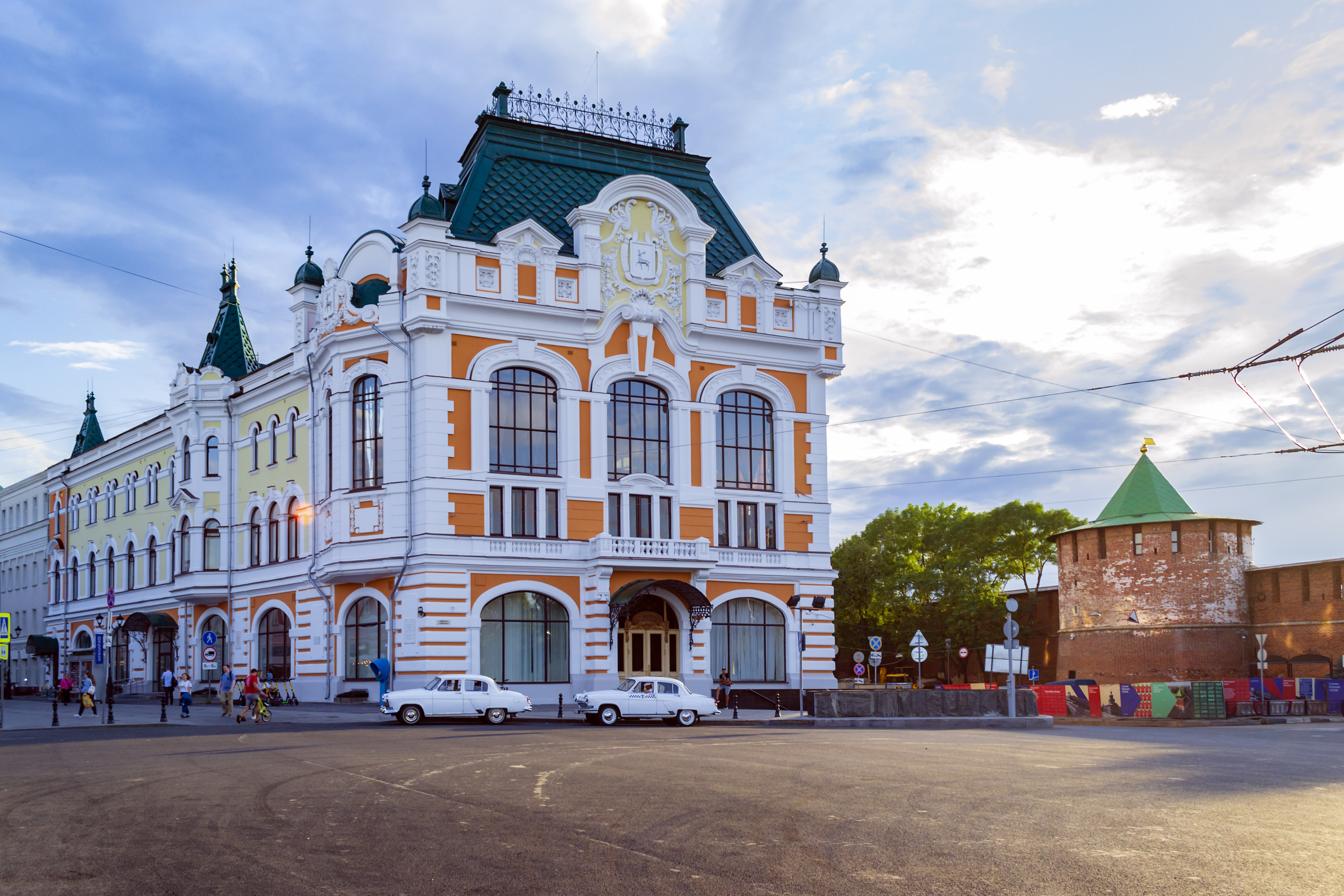
The former City Duma building on Minin and Pozharsky Square

The city of Nizhny Novgorod is governed by the city administration and the City Duma. The mayor of the city may be the chairman of the City Duma; however, it may be another person.

The mayor is at the head of the city. The city administration and the city duma are subordinate to him. There are no direct elections of the mayor for city residents. The mayor is appointed by the decision of the City Duma. Since 28 October 2020, Yuri Shalabaev has been the mayor of Nizhny Novgorod.

District heads are not elected.

=== Politics ===
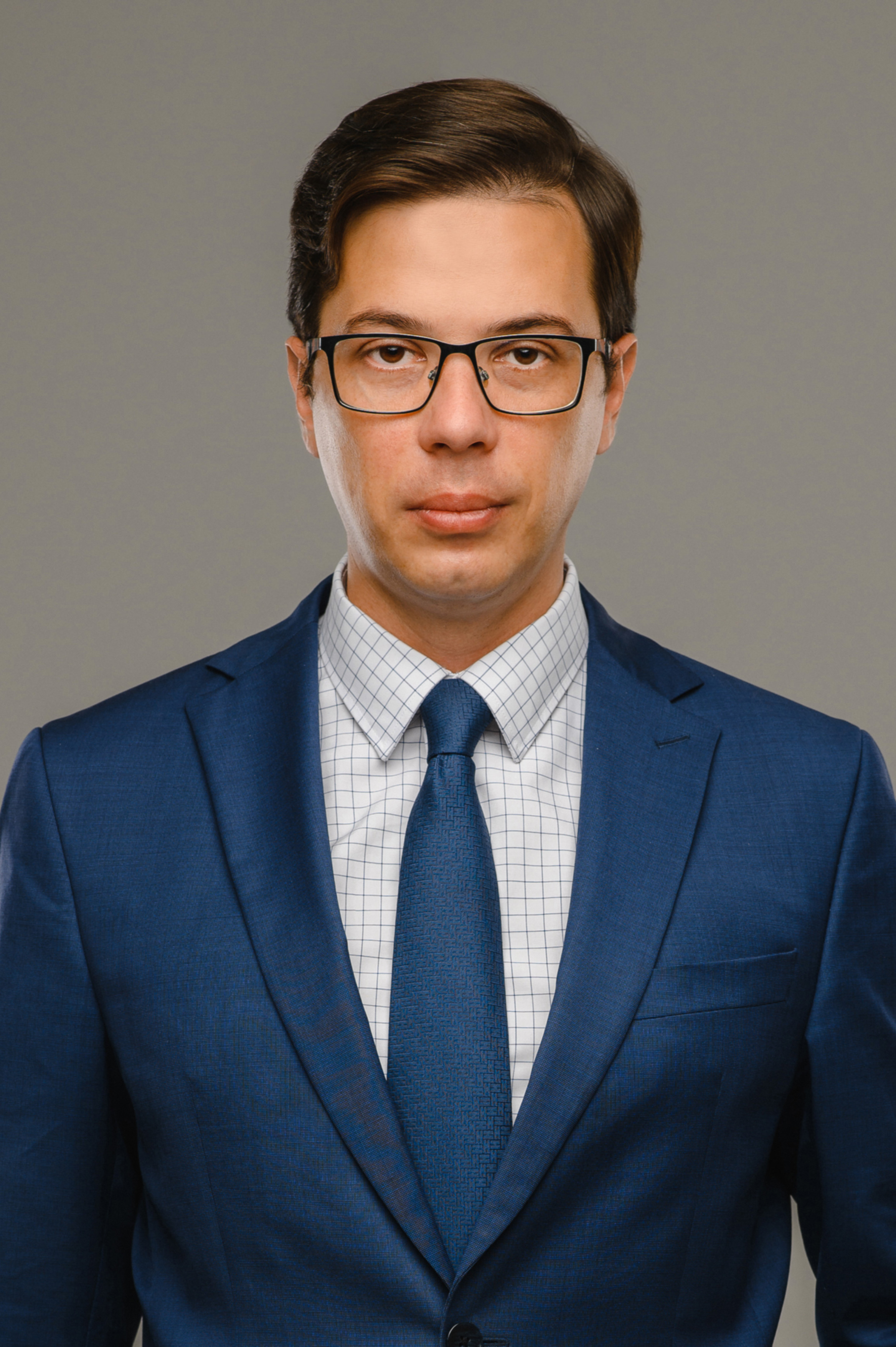
The current mayor of Nizhny Novgorod is Yuri Shalabaev

From 1991 to 2009, the mayor of the city was elected by the townspeople for a term of 5 years. During this time, four people have been in this post: Dmitry Bednyakov, Ivan Sklyarov, Yuri Lebedev, Vadim Bulavinov (twice).

In recent years, the role of the regional government headed by the governor in city affairs has significantly increased.

On 25 October 2010, the position of mayor was abolished and instead two formal positions appeared—the head of the city and the head of the administration. Oleg Sorokin was elected mayor of the city. At an extraordinary meeting of the City Duma on 3 December 2010, Oleg Kondrashov was approved as the head of the administration of Nizhny Novgorod.

On 22 July 2015, by the decision of the City Duma of Nizhny Novgorod, Kondrashov was removed from his post. Since then, he has been wanted by the police. On 19 December 2017, the mayor of the city, Oleg Sorokin, was arrested. On 7 March 2019, the Nizhny Novgorod District Court sentenced him to 10 years in a strict regime colony with a fine of 460.8 million rubles.

On 7 October 2015, Ivan Karnilin became the head of the city. In December 2016, opposition blogger Alexei Navalny published a video of his investigation, featuring Karnilin as the hero. As it turned out, it is possible that his ex-wife bought two apartments in Miami in 2013 and 2014 for a total of almost $2 million. On 23 May 2017, Karnilin wrote a letter of resignation, which was adopted by the City Duma. All this time, an anti-corruption check was going on, which began long before the "investigation" of Alexei Navalny.

After Ivan Karnilin, the last position of the head of the city was held by Elizaveta Solonchenko, who held it from 21 June to 20 December 2017. After that, the post of mayor of the city returned, which was taken by Vladimir Panov. He held this position from 17 January 2018 to 6 May 2020. Panov resigned ahead of schedule in connection with the transfer to a new position of Deputy Chairman of the State Commission for the Development of the Arctic.

Since 6 May 2020, Yury Shalabaev has taken the post of mayor. He introduced the practice of weekly online meetings with city residents in his Telegram channel. This significantly affected the speed of execution of various instructions and control. Shalabaev works closely with Governor Gleb Nikitin. Under his mayorship, a large-scale modernization of public transport continues: the purchase of new transport, the introduction of contactless payment, the construction of new metro stations. The quality of roads has also improved. The system of Nizhny Novgorod central diameters was launched.

=== City symbols ===

The historical coat of arms of Nizhny Novgorod was approved on 16 August 1781.

The coat of arms and flag of the city depicts a red deer, which is a symbol of nobility, purity and greatness, life, wisdom and justice. The current city coat of arms and flag were adopted on 20 December 2006.

The coat of arms of the city of Nizhny Novgorod is an image of a deer on a French heraldic shield, framed on the sides and bottom with a ribbon of the Order of Lenin. Above the upper part of the coat of arms there is a five-toothed crown, showing that Nizhny Novgorod is an urban district—the capital of the Nizhny Novgorod Oblast.

The unofficial historical symbols of the city are also the Dmitrievskaya Tower of the Kremlin, the Spit and the Chkalov Stairs.

== Economy ==
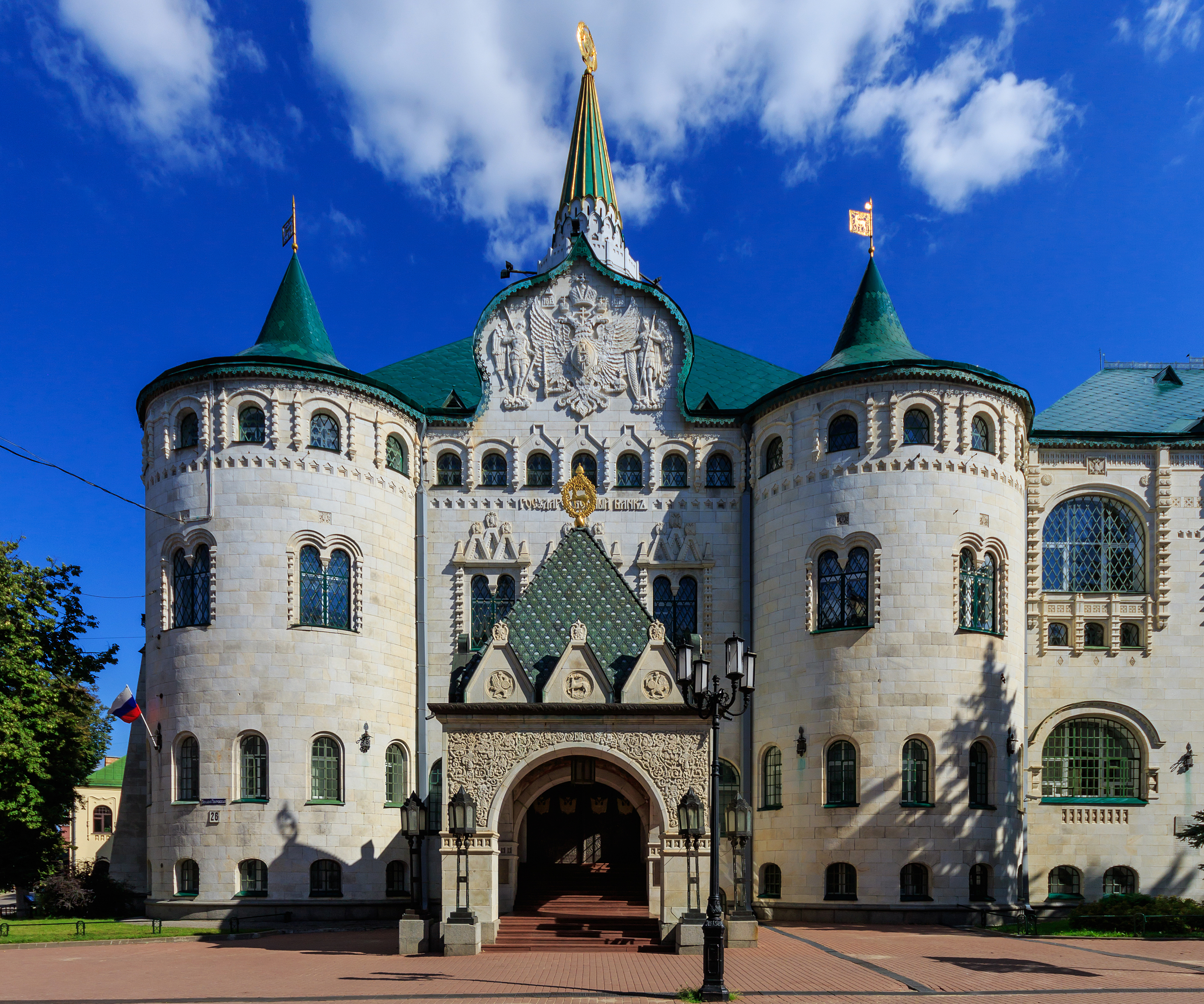
State Bank of Nizhny Novgorod, built in 1913

Since the reign of Emperor Alexander III, Nizhny Novgorod has become the centre of all-Russian merchants. On 15 July 1822 the largest Nizhny Novgorod fair was solemnly opened on the left bank of the Oka. Then Nizhny Novgorod became the main city of all-Russian and international trade. In 1929, the Fair was closed, and the city's economy began to develop in a completely different direction.

The Soviet city of Gorky became one of the largest industrial centres in Russia, the leading role in which belonged to the enterprises of mechanical engineering, metalworking and information technology. At the same time, the first auto giant, the Gorky Automobile Plant, was built.

The very foundation of the city at the confluence of two navigable rivers predetermined both its military-strategic and commercial significance. Local merchants traded not only with Moscow, Kazan, Yaroslavl, Astrakhan, but also with the cities of Europe and Central Asia. In May 1767, during the royal visit of Empress Catherine II, she ordered the creation of a new enterprise, the Nizhny Novgorod Trading Company.

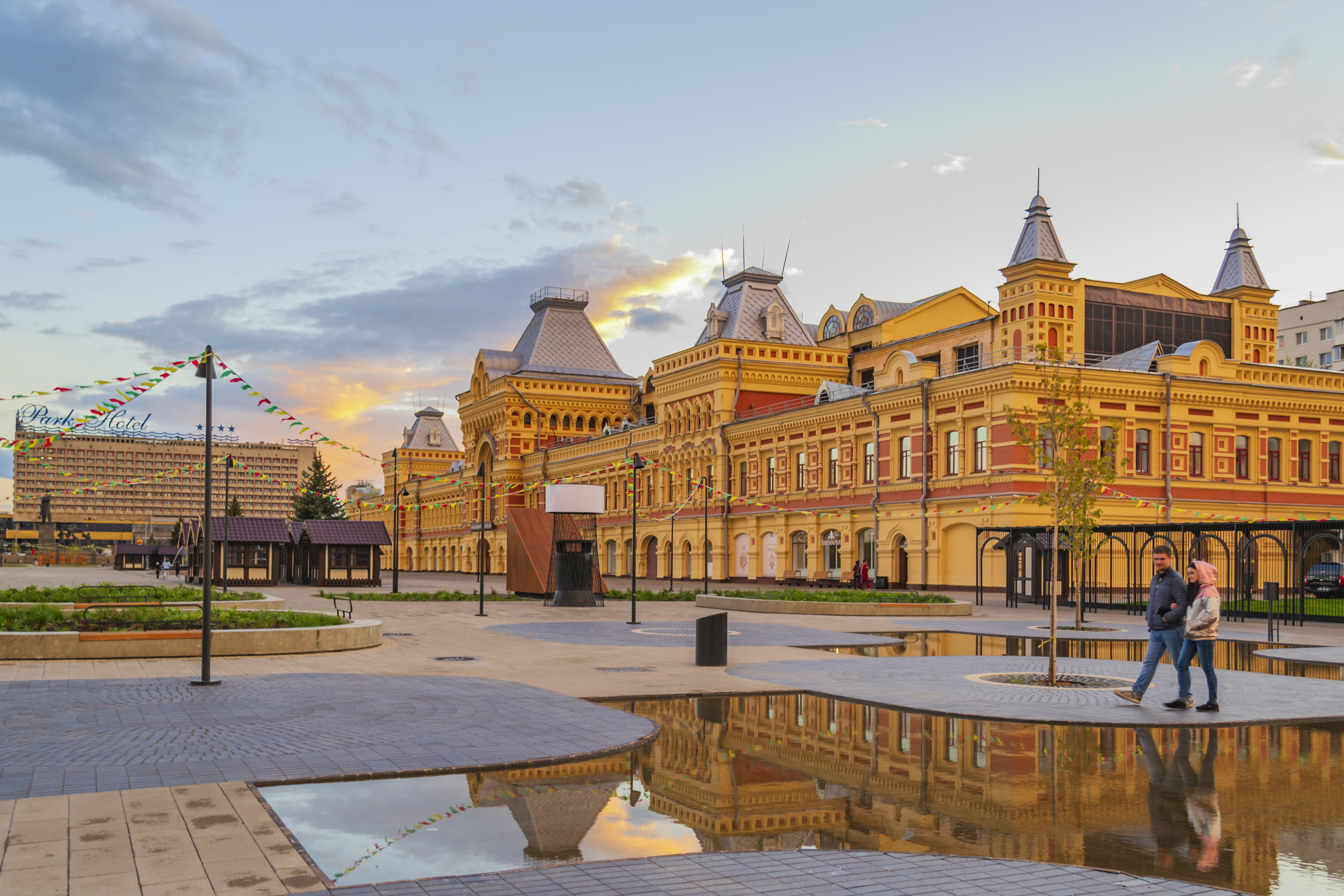
Nizhny Novgorod Fair

The main factor in the formation of Nizhny Novgorod as the main trading centre of Russia at the beginning of the 19th century was the transfer here in 1817 of the Makariev Fair.

At the expense of the treasury, under the general project and under the leadership of Augustine de Betancourt, the largest guest complex in Europe was created. At the stage before 1822, the Cathedral of the Savior was built according to the project of Auguste de Montferrand, 3 administrative, 4 "Chinese" wooden and 56 brick buildings with thousands of shops, hotels, taverns and a summer theatre. For the first time in Europe, sewerage was provided here. At the second stage, the complex of the Cathedral of the Savior was completed, a mosque and an Armenian-Gregorian church were built. The third stage marked a strict rectangular redevelopment of the fair with the paving of all streets, the creation of a number of new places of worship, including the Alexander Nevsky Cathedral, a three-story commercial building, called the Persian Caravanserai, was erected near the mosque. The fourth stage was the last in a series of reconstructions and included: the construction of the stone circus of the Nikitin brothers, the Brazilian passage on theatre Square, the new Main Fair House in the Russian style, which became one of the largest passages of the Russian Empire.

The current Nizhny Novgorod fair is an interactive museum. The inauguration of the governor and various official events are held in the armorial hall.

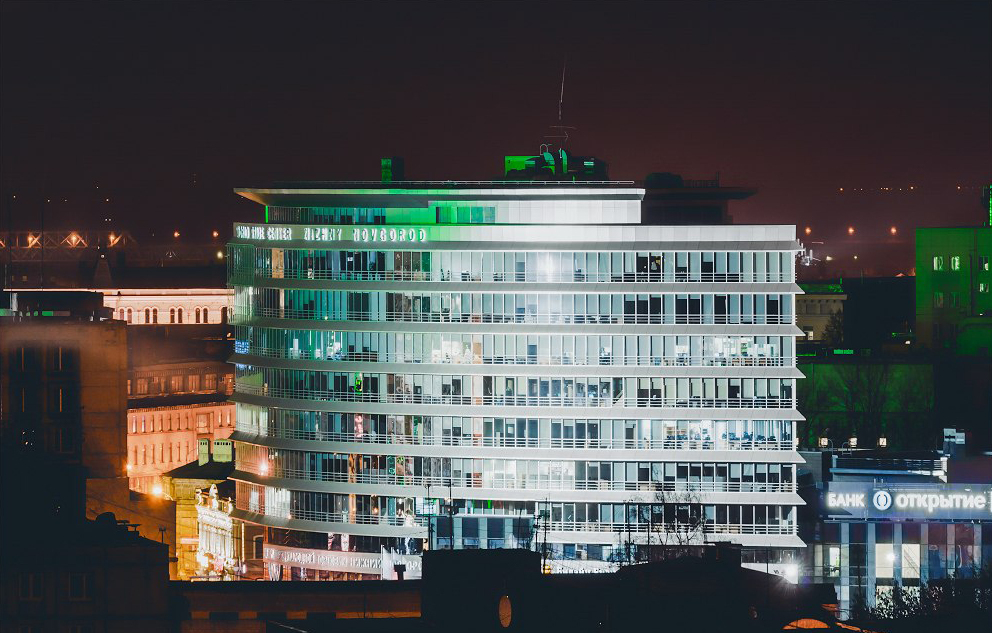
World Trade centre Nizhny Novgorod

Currently, trade in Nizhny Novgorod is represented mainly by its retail sector. In the 1990s, Belinsky Street was actively built up with shopping centres. In the mid-2000s, three shopping centres were built on the territory of Old Kanavino near the Railway Station, on Revolution Square. In 2008, in the very centre of Nizhny Novgorod, near the historical quarter known as the Black Pond, the Lobachevsky Plaza business centre was built, which was recognized as one of the best architectural projects of 2009.

In January 2019, Nizhny Novgorod was recognized as the best city in Russia in terms of quality of life. It took first place among Russian cities and 109th in the world in terms of quality of life. The rating was compiled by the website numbeo.com, which specializes in statistics on the cost of living and consumer prices in different countries of the world. When compiling the rating, the purchasing power of the population, safety, health care, the cost of living, the ratio of real estate prices and incomes of the population, traffic congestion, the level of environmental pollution, and climate were taken into account.

In 2022, the average nominal salary in Nizhny Novgorod, according to Federal State Statistics Service, was 45,795 rubles.

=== Information technology ===
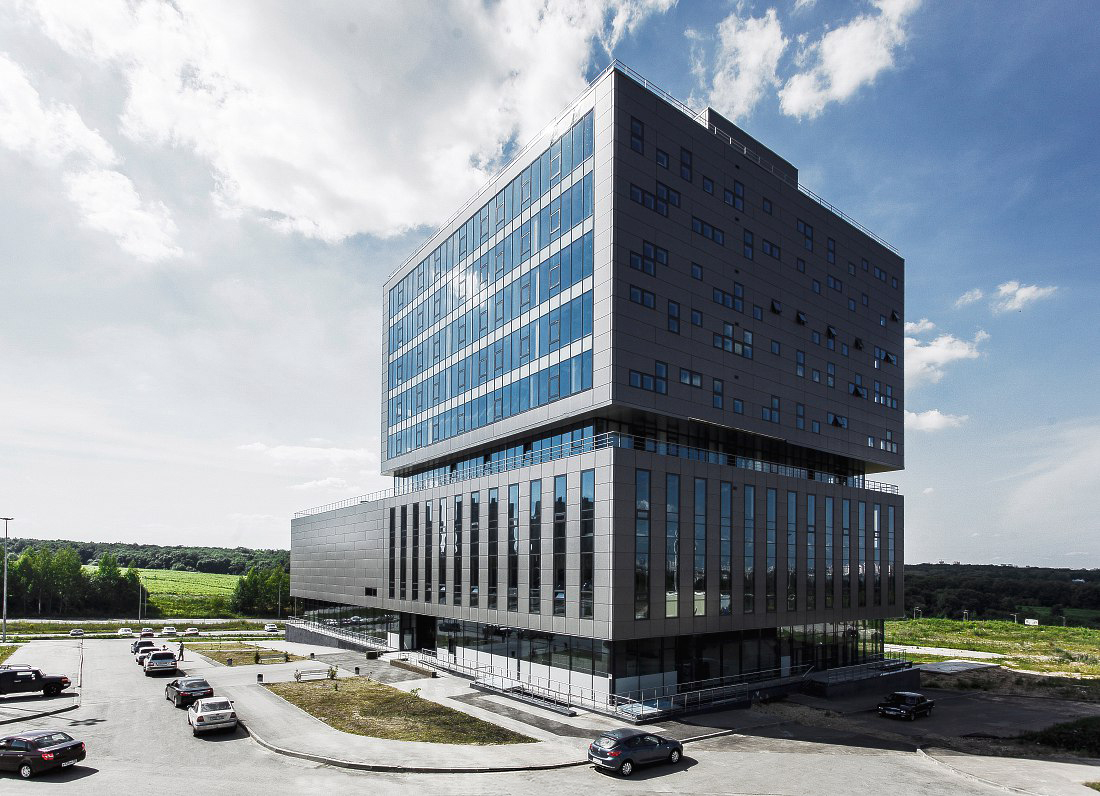
IT-Park

Nizhny Novgorod is one of the centres of the IT industry in Russia. It ranks among the leading Russian cities in terms of the quantity of software R&D providers. Intel has a big software research and development centre with more than 500 engineers in the city, as well as a major data centre. In 2022 Intel suspended business operations in Nizhny Novgorod.

In Nizhny Novgorod, there are also a number of offshore outsourcing software developers, including Bell Integrator, Itseez, Tecom, Luximax Systems Ltd, MERA, RealEast Networks, Auriga, SoftDrom and Teleca, as well as many other smaller companies specialising in the delivery of services to telecommunication vendors.

There are 25 scientific R&D institutions focusing on telecommunications, radio technology, theoretical and applied physics, and 33 higher educational institutions, among them are Nizhny Novgorod State University, Nizhny Novgorod State Technical University, Privolzhsky Research Medical University, as well as Nizhny Novgorod Institute of Information Technologies, that focuses on information technologies, software development, system administration, telecommunications, cellular networks, Internet technologies, and IT management.

Nizhny Novgorod has also been chosen as one of four sites for building an IT-oriented technology park – a special zone that has an established infrastructure and enjoys a favourable tax and customs policy.

=== Engineering industry ===
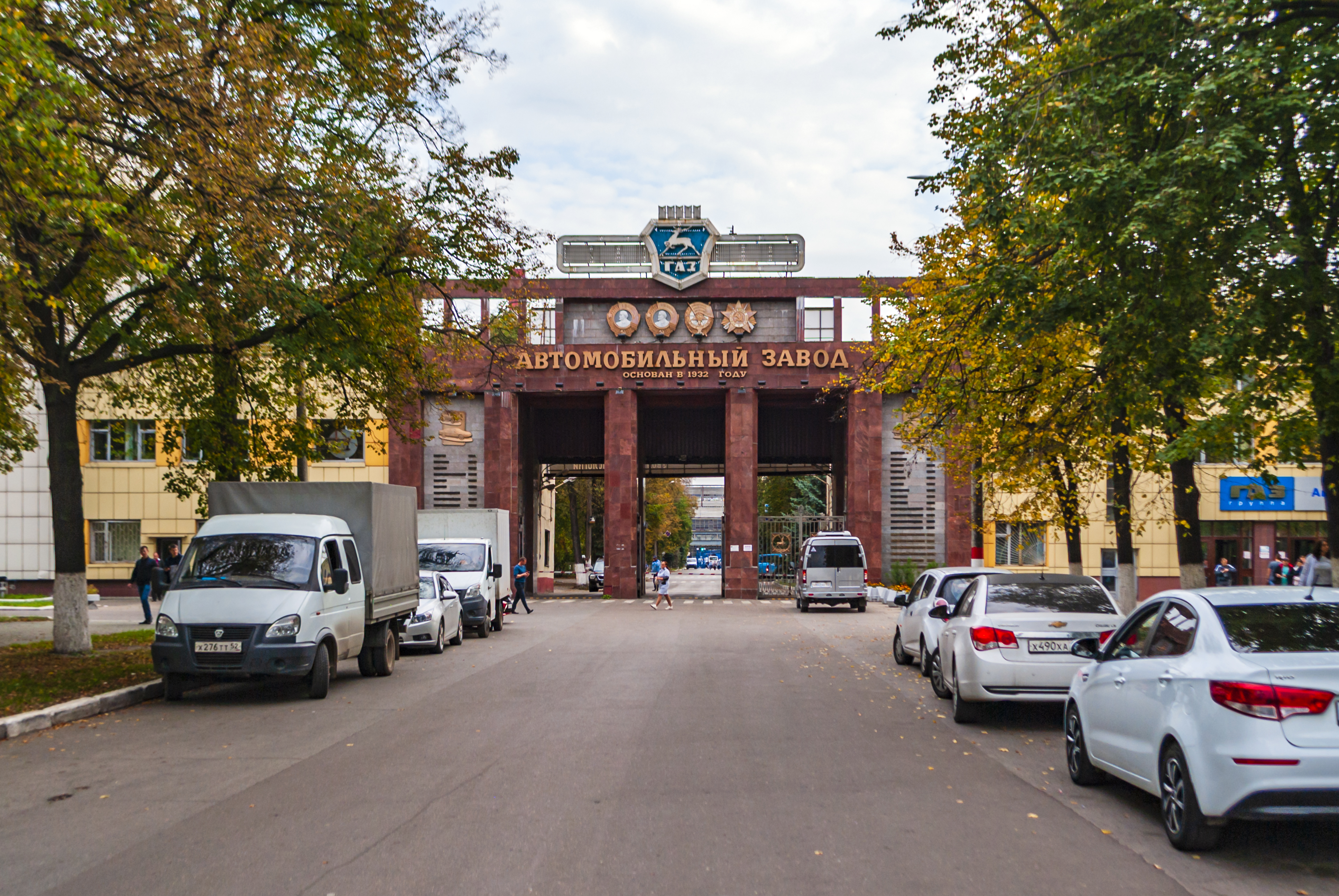
Gorky Automobile Plant

Engineering is the leading industry of Nizhny Novgorod's economy with transportation – the auto industry, shipbuilding, diesel engines, aircraft manufacture, and machine tools – predominating; the auto industry being the leading sector (50%).

Some of the largest plants include:

- JSC Gorky Automobile Plant – personal cars, trucks, armored personnel carriers, and other autos
- JSC Krasnoye Sormovo – river and sea ships, submarines
- JSC Sokol – planes, jets
- PJSC Nizhny Novgorod Machine-building Plant – armament, artillery, howitzers, anti-tank guns, oil and gas fittings
- JSC Hydromash – hydraulic actuators, landing gear
- JSC Nitel – TV sets
- JSC RUMO – diesel generators
- JSC Krasny yakor – anchor chains
- OKBM Afrikantov – nuclear reactors

== Transportation ==
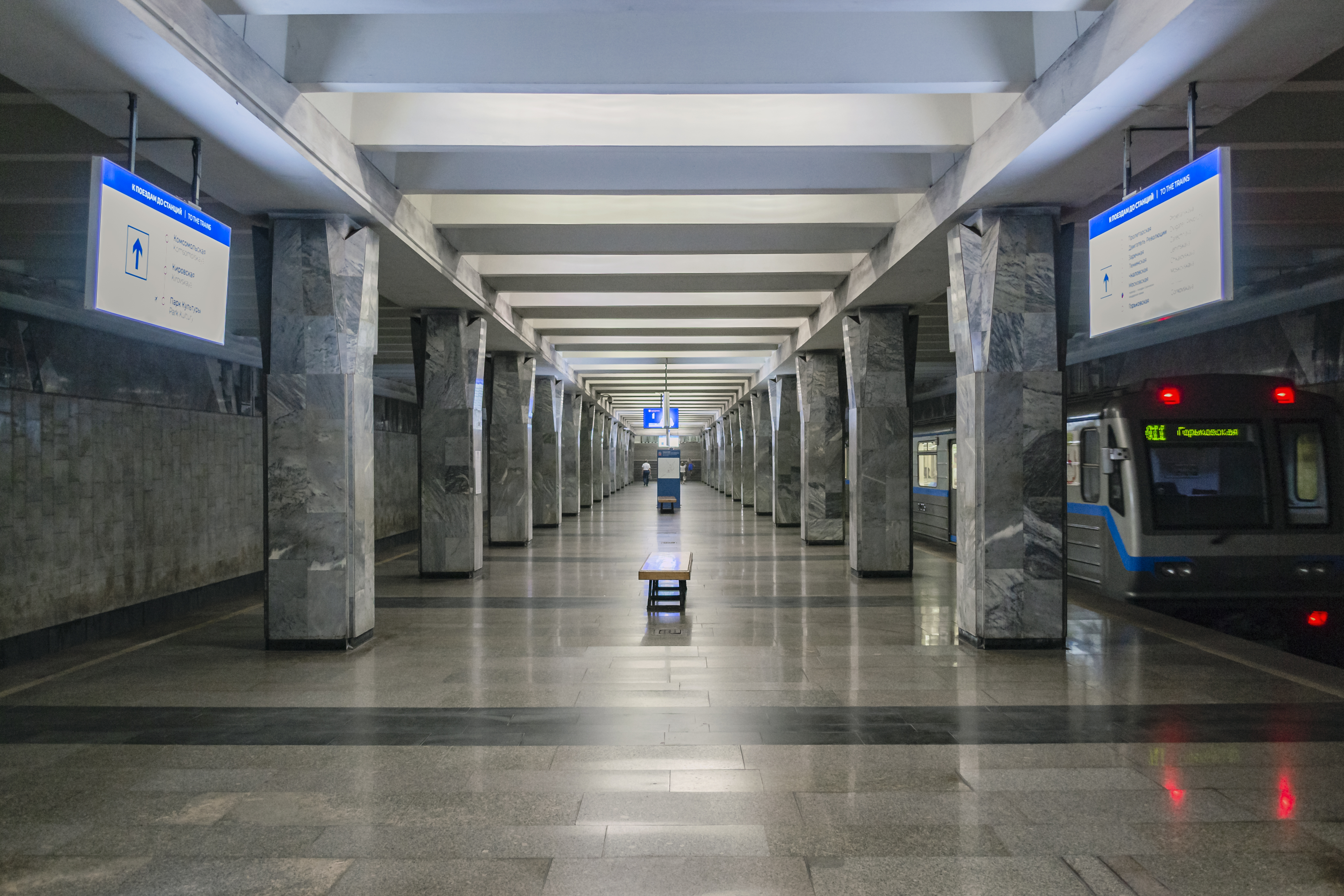
Avtozavodskaya metro station

=== Local public transportation ===
Public transportation within the city is provided by a trams, marshrutkas (routed taxis), buses, and trolleybuses. Electric and diesel commuter trains run to suburbs in several directions.

==== Metro ====
Nizhny Novgorod Metro underground rapid transit system was opened in 1985; it now has two lines with 15 stations, connecting with railway terminal, and carrying 102,000 passengers daily.

==== S-Train ====
Nizhny Novgorod City Rail is a network of railway transport (S-Train) in the city. Together with the metro it forms a system of high-speed rail transport of the city. It has two lines: Sormovskaya and Priokskaya. It was founded on 24 June 2013, on the basis of the Gorky Railway, as an addition to the metro.

=== Railway ===
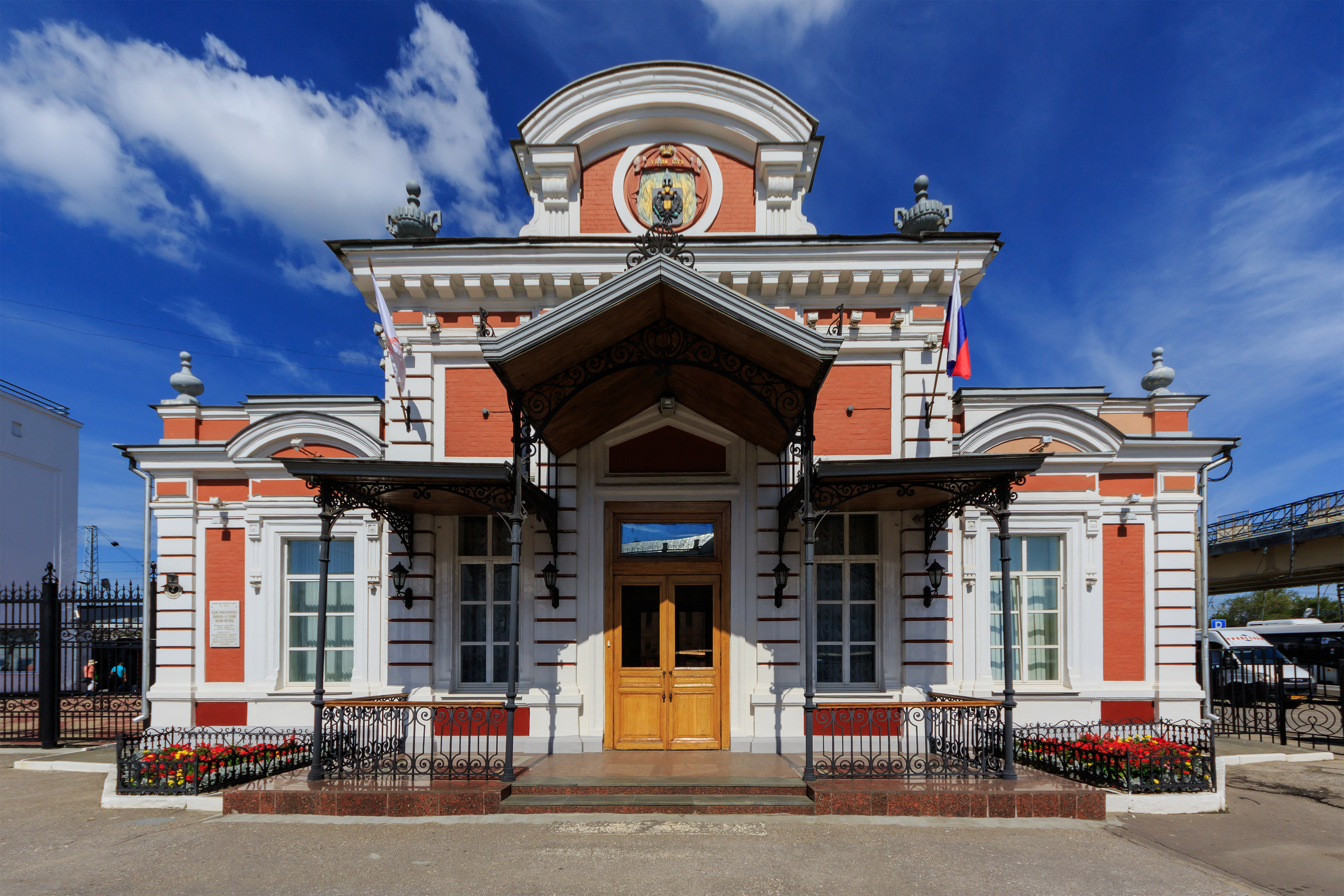
Emperor's Pavilion on Moskovsky railway terminal.

The Gorky Railway, a Russian Railways department which operates some 5,700 km (3,500 mi) of rail lines throughout the Middle Volga region and 1,200 km (750 mi) in Nizhny Novgorod Oblast, is headquartered in Nizhny Novgorod. Since 1862, there has been a railway connection between Nizhny Novgorod and Moscow. Overnight trains provide access to Nizhny Novgorod from Moscow, Saint Petersburg, Kazan, Yaroslavl and others. А fast train transports passengers between Nizhny Novgorod and Moscow in less than four hours. Passengers can continue from Nizhny Novgorod eastward along the Trans-Siberian Railway, with direct trains to major cities in the Urals and Siberia, as well as to Beijing, Pyongyang and Ulaanbaatar.

The first high-speed rail Sapsan train to Moscow (Kursky Rail Terminal) and Saint Petersburg (Moskovsky Rail Terminal) was launched on 30 July 2010. The route has been run using Strizh trains since 2015.

Suburban commuter trains (elektrichka) connect Nizhny Novgorod with Vladimir, Dzerzhinsk, Murom, Kirov, Arzamas, Zavolzhye, Balakhna, and others.

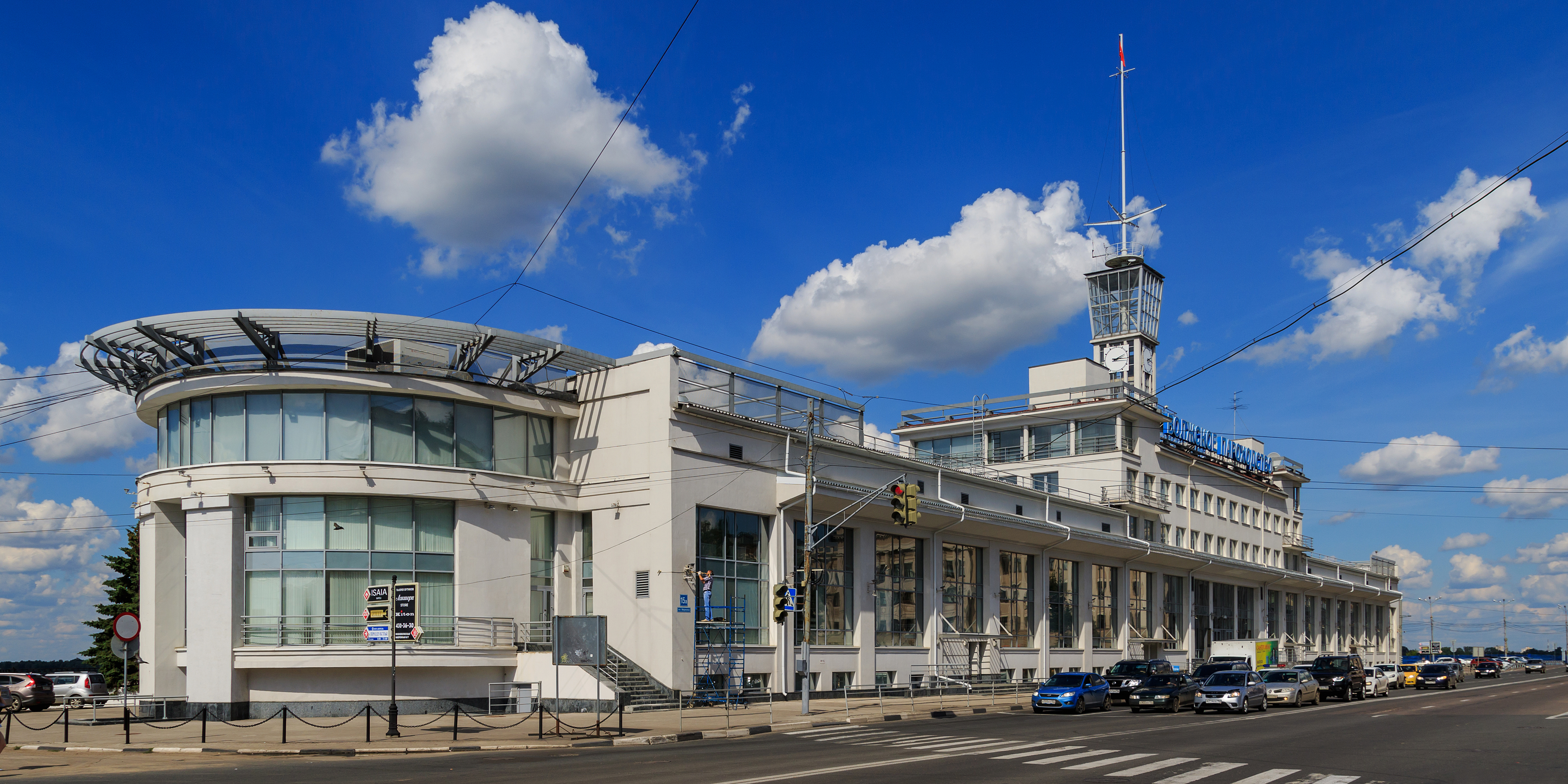
River terminal

=== Waterways ===
Nizhny Novgorod is an important centre of Volga cargo and passenger shipping. During summer, cruise vessels operate between Nizhny Novgorod, Moscow, Saint Petersburg, and Astrakhan. In 2006 a small number of Meteor-class hydrofoils resumed operations on the Volga river. In August 2019, river navigation within the region was resumed. The hydrofoil Valdai began to sail along the routes Nizhny Novgorod – Gorodets and Nizhny Novgorod – Makaryevo.

=== Highway ===
The city is served by the Russian highway M-7 (Moscow – Nizhny Novgorod – Kazan – Ufa), and is a hub of the regional highway network. Also through the city passes the federal highway P158 (Nizhny Novgorod – Saransk – Penza – Saratov).

=== Intercity buses ===
The system of Nizhny Novgorod's bus terminals underwent significant changes in 2015, as the old main intercity bus terminal in Lyadov Square (just south of the city centre) closed, and a new bus terminal opened in Scherbinki, a few miles to the south. Currently, the city's main bus terminals are the following:

- Kanavino Bus Station, near the Moscow Railway Station. Mostly serves directions west and northwest (e.g. toward Moscow)
- Scherbinki Bus Station, a few miles south of the city centre. Mostly serves directions east and south.

Out of the three bus terminals, only the Kanavino station is near a subway line; the other two are connected with the rest of the city by city buses.

=== Aerial cableway ===
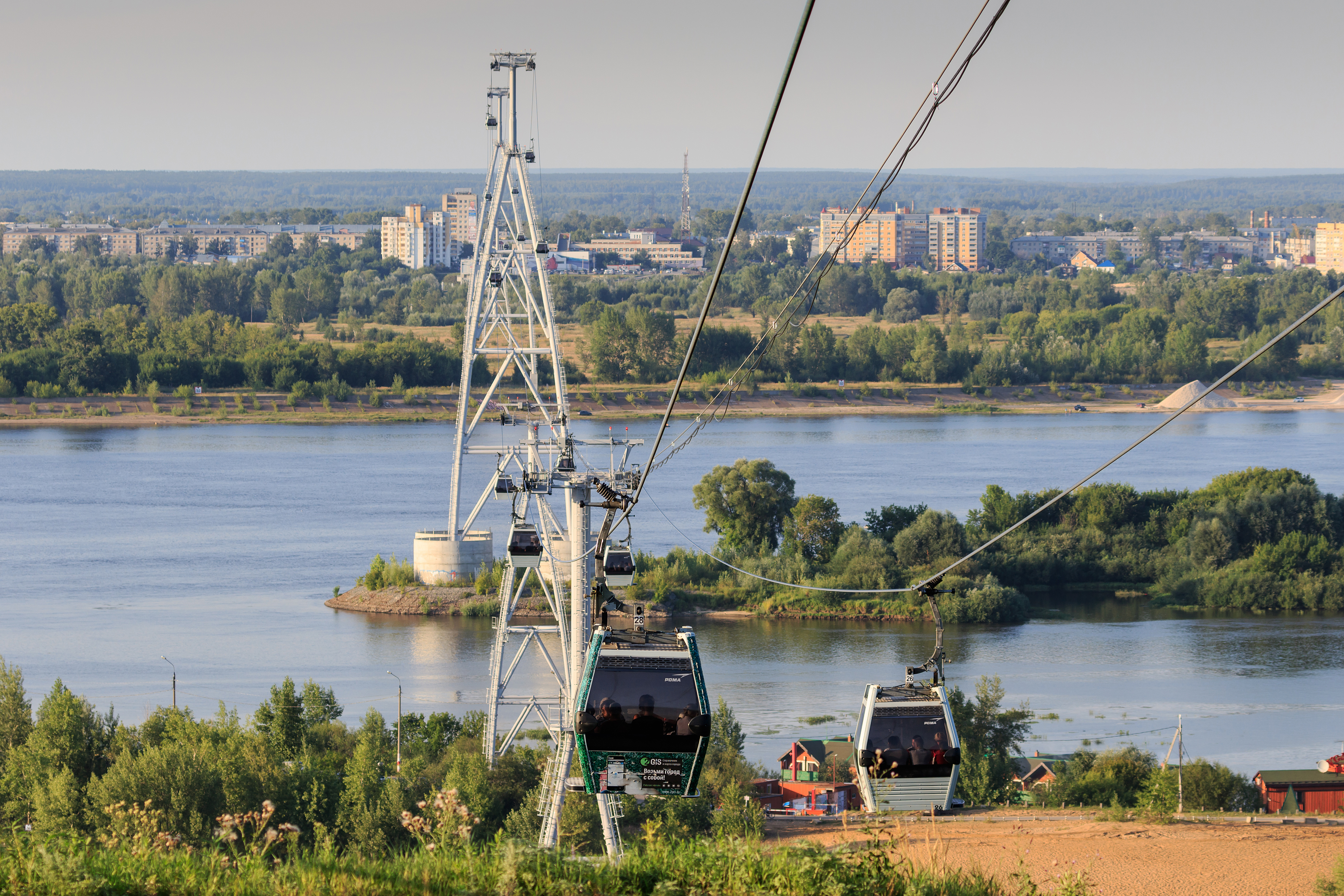
Nizhny Novgorod-Bor Cableway

In 2012, the cableway connecting Nizhny Novgorod and Bor was launched. The length of the cableway is 3.5 km (2.2 miles). It has the largest unsupported span in Europe above the water surface, which is 861 metres (2,825 feet). The main purpose is to provide an alternative type of passenger transportation in addition to river taxis, electric trains and buses. The cable car has also become a popular tourist attraction, thanks to panoramic views from the cabins.

Not far from Nizhegorodskaya station there are the Nizhny Novgorod Cathedral Mosque and Pechersky Ascension Monastery.

Around 100 metres (330 feet) from the Borskaya station is the park of historical reconstruction of Pax Romana, which represents a collective image of a site of the Roman borderland at the turn of the 1st–2nd centuries AD, with a military camp and a small town that developed from the Marktant village at the camp. On 31 July 2014, there was an incident when lightning struck a metal support near the booth during a heavy thunderstorm, and the cable car was stopped with people in the cabins.

=== Air travel ===
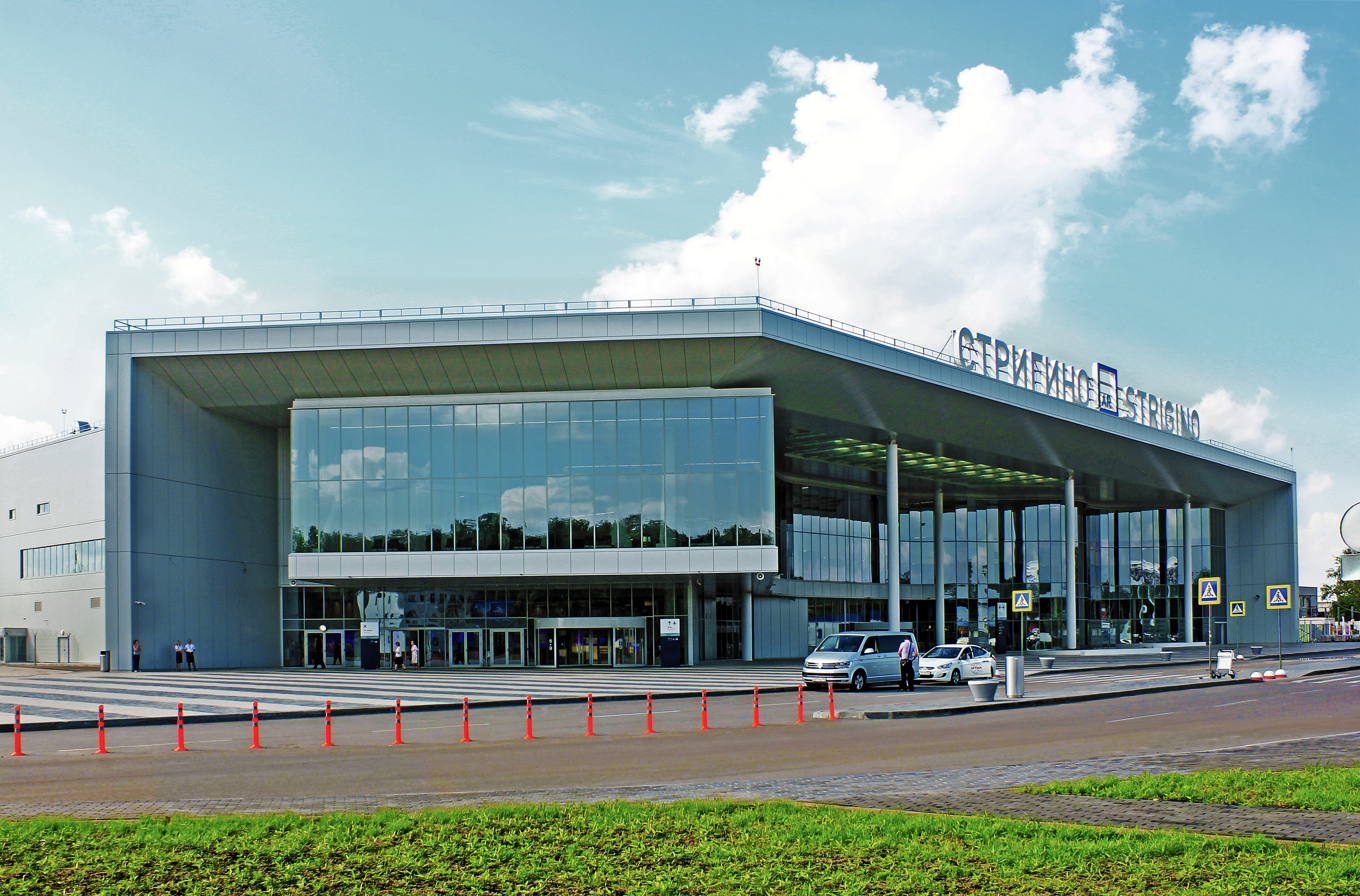
Strigino International Airport.

Nizhny Novgorod is served by Strigino International Airport, which has direct flights to major Russian cities and the Middle East. The air base Sormovo was an important military airlift facility, and Pravdinsk air base was an interceptor aircraft base during the Cold War. S7 Airlines and Aeroflot fly to Moscow's Domodedovo and Sheremetyevo Airports daily.

It is unknown when the first aerodrome in Nizhny Novgorod was built, but its location was 0.5 km (0.31 mi) north of where the "Moscow" cinema stands today. This aerodrome was named Nizhny Novgorod Airport. In 2011 HC Airports of Regions won their bid on the investment project into Nizhny Novgorod International Airport. In 2012, renovations were made in order to more efficiently exploit the existing facility while the new one is being built.

A new terminal was opened on 29 December 2015, able to handle around 300 passengers per hour.

== Main sights ==
Much of the central city is built in the Russian Revival and Stalin Empire styles. The dominating feature of the city skyline is the grand Kremlin (1500–1511), with its red-brick towers. After Bolshevik devastation, the only ancient edifice left within the Kremlin walls is the tent-like Archangel Cathedral (1624–1631), first built in stone in the 13th century.

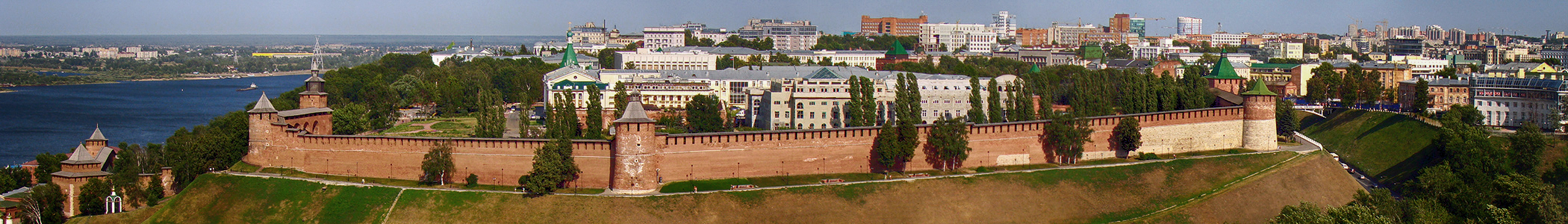
The Nizhny Novgorod Kremlin

There are more than 600 unique historic, architectural and cultural monuments in the city. There are about 200 municipal and regional art and cultural institutions within Nizhny Novgorod. Among these institutions, there are eight theatres, five concert halls, 97 libraries (with branches), 17 cinemas (including five for children), 25 institutions of children's optional education, eight museums (16 including branches), and seven parks.

=== The Fair ===
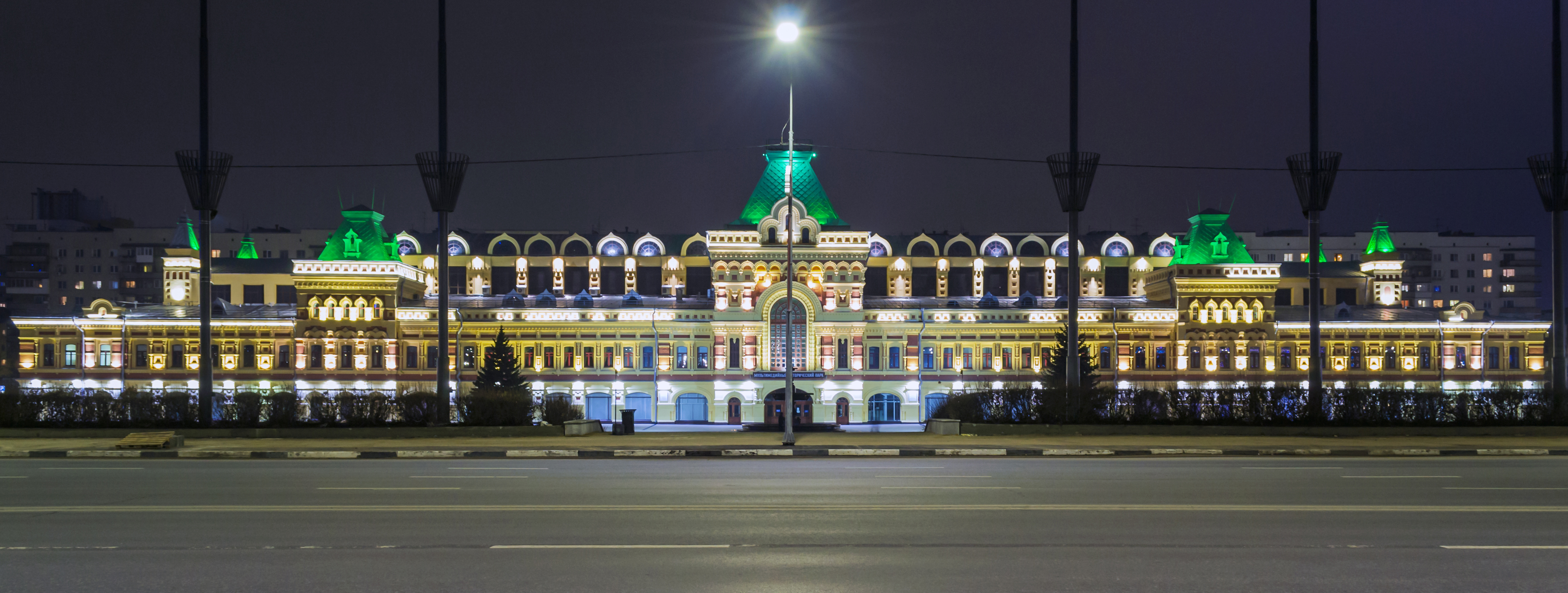
The Main Fair Building

The centre of the fair was the main building in the spirit of classicism and the side administrative buildings that formed the central square. To protect from floods, a 3.5 m (11 ft) high dam was built. On 4 November 2017, a new multimedia exhibition called "Russia is My History" was opened in the Main Fair Building. The main focus of the exhibition is the history of Nizhny Novgorod, starting from Finnic peoples. On the territory of the complex there are departments in which they tell about the foundation of the city, the struggle for independence in the Time of Troubles and the bombing of the city during the World War II.

=== Bolshaya Pokrovskaya Street ===
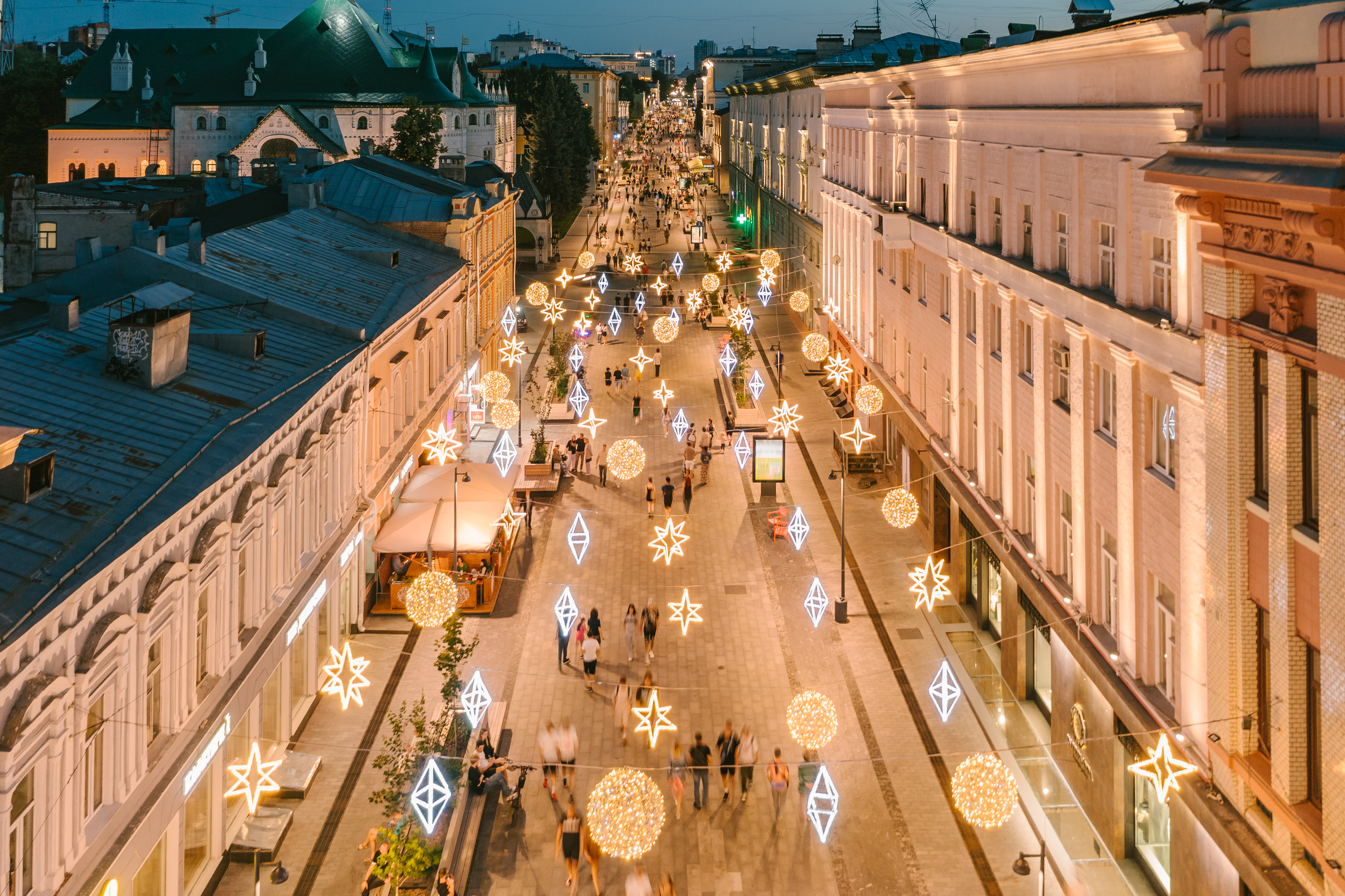
Bolshaya Pokrovskaya Street.

This is the main street of Nizhny Novgorod, located in the city centre. Most of it is pedestrianised. There are many architectural monuments and various street sculptures.

=== Nizhny Novgorod art gallery ===
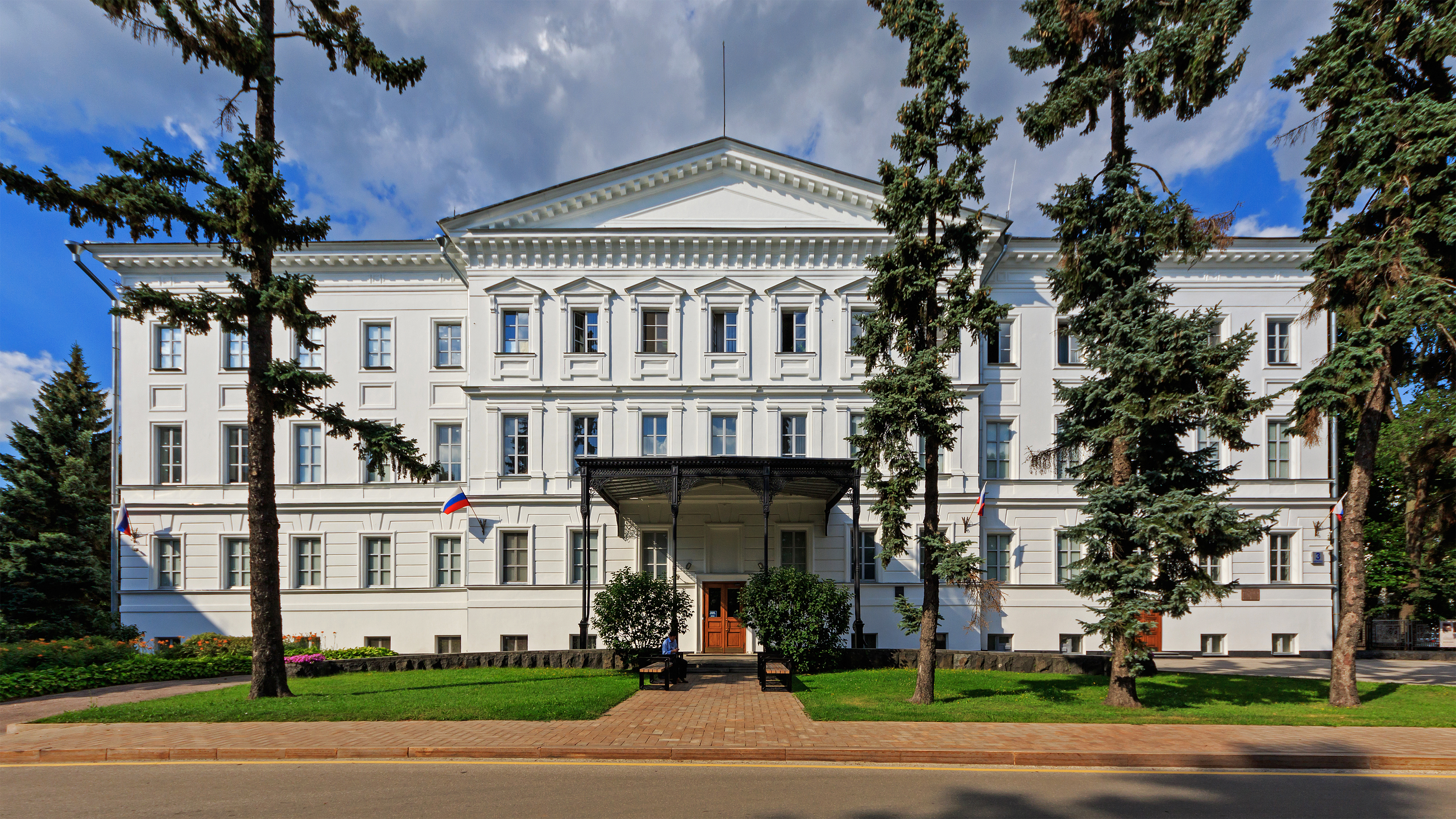
The State art gallery

The art gallery in Nizhny Novgorod is a large and important art gallery and museums of human history and culture.

Nizhny Novgorod has an art gallery with more than 12,000 exhibits, as well as a large collection of works by Russian artists such as Viktor Vasnetsov, Karl Briullov, Ivan Shishkin, Ivan Kramskoi, Ilya Yefimovich Repin, Isaak Iljitsch Lewitan, Vasily Surikov and Ivan Aivazovsky. There are also collections of works by Boris Kustodiev and Nicholas Roerich, as well as Western European art including works by David Teniers the Younger, Bernardo Bellotto, Lucas Cranach the Elder, Pieter de Grebber, Giuseppe Maria Crespi and Giovanni Battista Piranesi.

The gallery also includes a collection of Russian avant-garde works including those by Kazimir Malevich, Wassily Kandinsky, Natalia Goncharova and Mikhail Larionov. There is also a collection of East Asian art.

=== Houses of worship ===
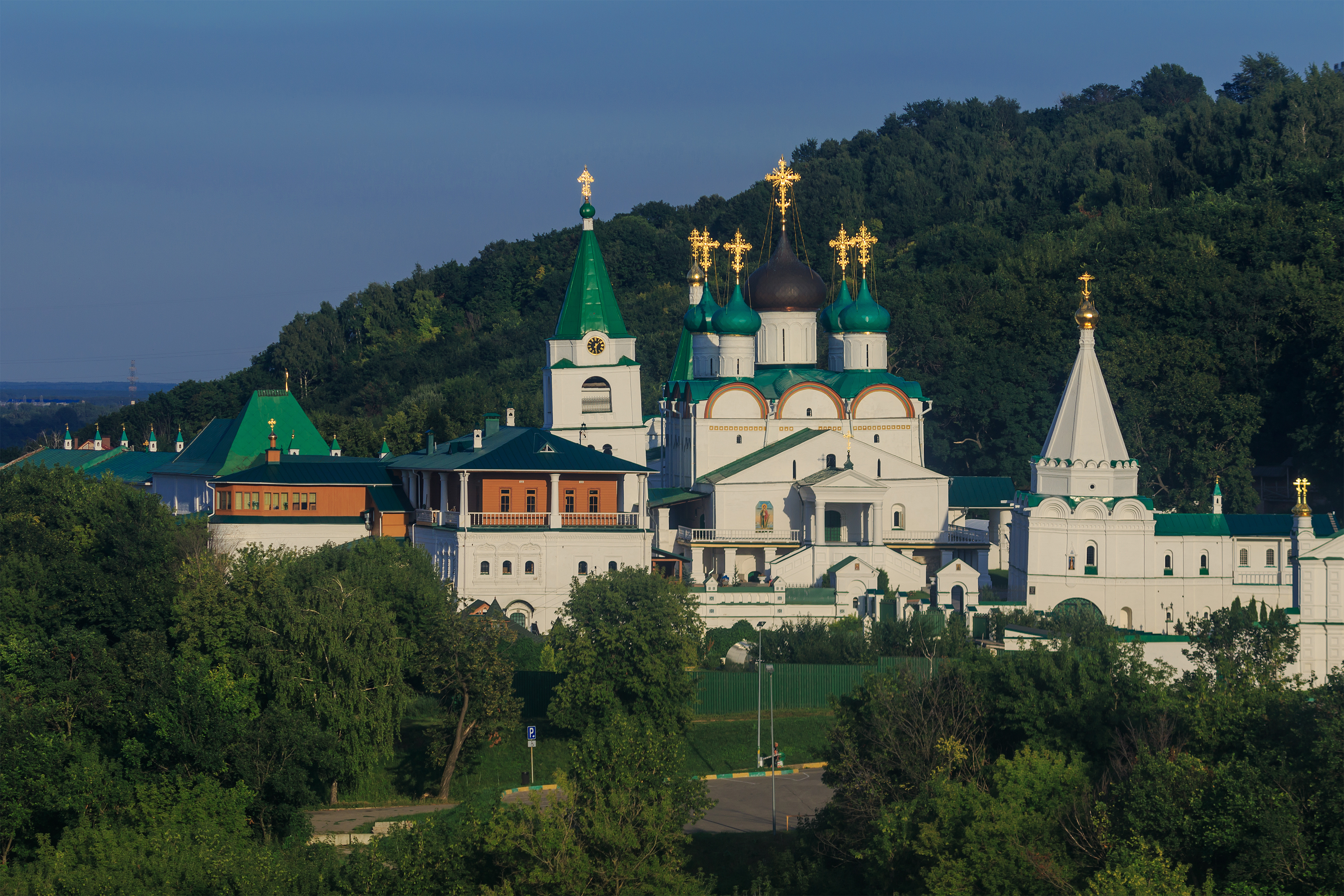
Pechersky Ascension Monastery

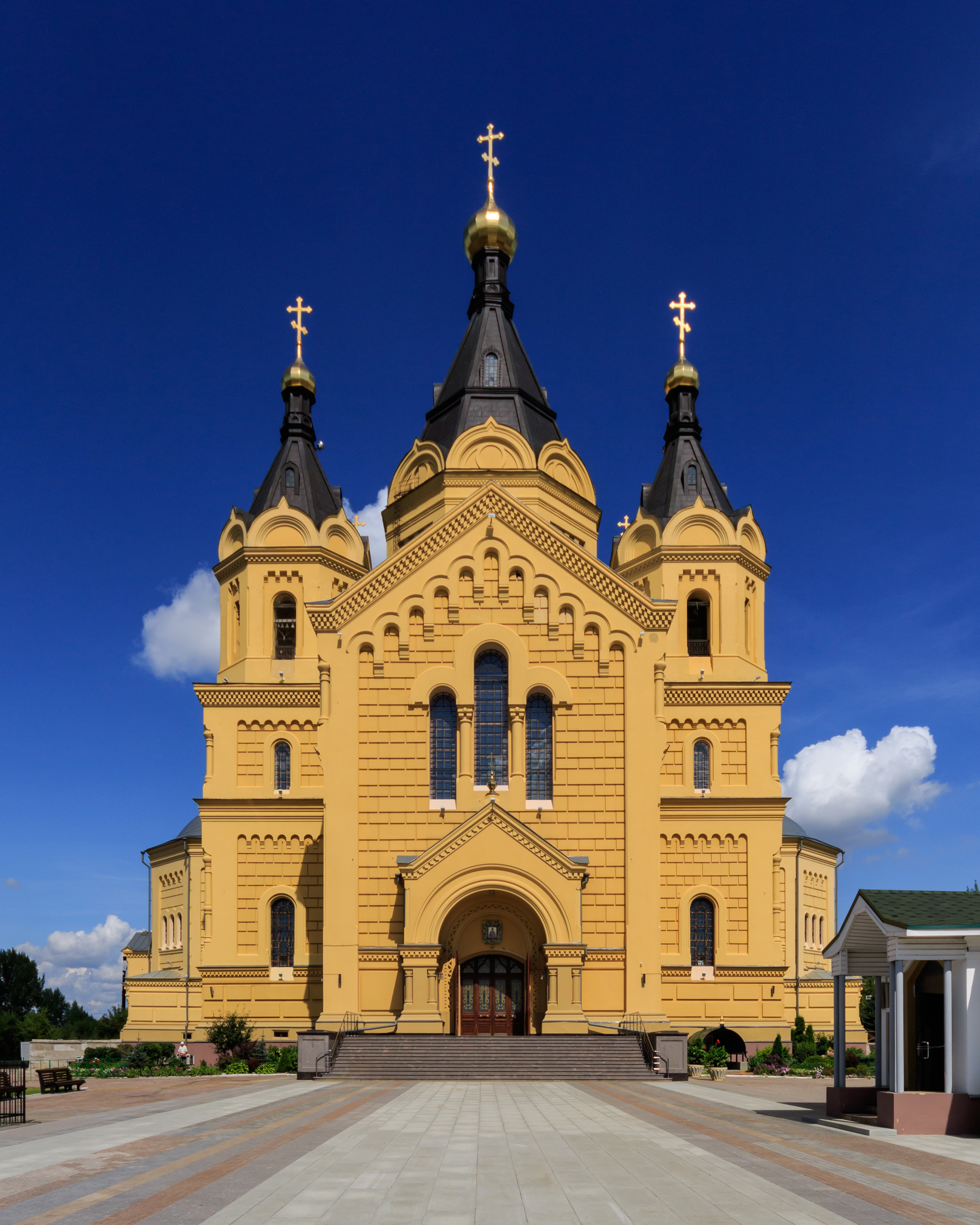
Alexander Nevsky Cathedral (New Fair Cathedral)

Other notable landmarks are the two great medieval abbeys. The Pechersky Ascension Monastery features the austere five-domed cathedral (1632) and two rare churches surmounted by tent roofs, dating from the 1640s. The Annunciation monastery, likewise surrounded by strong walls, has another five-domed cathedral (1649) and the Assumption church (1678). The only private house preserved from that epoch formerly belonged to the merchant Pushnikov.

There can be little doubt that the most original and delightful churches in the city were built by the Stroganovs in the nascent Baroque style. Of these, the Virgin's Nativity Church (1719) graces one of the central streets, whereas the Church of Our Lady of Smolensk (1694–97) survives in the former village of Gordeyevka (now, part of the city's Kanavinsky District), where the Stroganov palace once stood.

Other notable churches include:

- the Transfiguration Cathedral, also known as the Old Fair Cathedral, a huge domed edifice built at the site of the great fair to an Empire style design by Agustín de Betancourt and Auguste de Montferrand in 1822;
- the Alexander Nevsky Cathedral, designed in the Russian Revival style and constructed between 1856 and 1880 at the Spit of Nizhny Novgorod (the confluence of the Oka and the Volga). It is the third-tallest Cathedral in Russia;
- the Church of the Nativity. One of the most beautiful churches in the city. Was built 1696–1719 on the means of the merchant Grigory Stroganov. It is one of the best examples of Stroganov style. Church located at the Rozhdestvenskaya Street.
- the recently reconstructed Church of the Nativity of John the Precursor (1676–83), standing just below the Kremlin walls; it was used during the Soviet period as an apartment house;
- the parish churches of the Holy Wives (1649) and of Saint Elijah (1656);
- the Assumption Church on St Elijah's Hill (1672), with five green-tiled domes arranged unorthodoxly on the lofty cross-shaped barrel roof;
- the shrine of the Old Believers at the Bugrovskoe cemetery, erected in the 1910s to a critically acclaimed design by Vladimir Pokrovsky;
- the wooden chapel of the Intercession (1660), transported to Nizhny Novgorod from a rural area.

The centrally located Nizhny Novgorod Synagogue was built in 1881–1883; disused during the Soviet era, it was renovated and reopened circa 1991.

=== Chkalov Stairs ===
The Chkalov Staircase connects Minin and Pozharsky Square, the Upper Volga, and the Lower Volga embankments. It was built by the architects Alexander Yakovlev, Lev Rudnev, and Vladimir Munts. The staircase itself was constructed in the late 1940s by German prisoners of war forced to labour around Gorky. It is the longest staircase in Russia. The staircase starts from the monument to Chkalov, near St. George's Tower of the Kremlin. It is built in the form of a figure of eight and consists of 560 steps if you count it on both sides. The number of steps from the bottom to the top is 442 on the right. In the intersections of the side slopes there are two observation platforms. At the bottom of the stairs is a monument to the Hero boat, which is located at the Lower Volga embankment.

=== Nizhny Novgorod Stadium ===
Standing on a spit of the Volga and Oka Rivers in the city centre is the international-class Nizhny Novgorod Stadium. This arena hosted six games of the 2018 FIFA World Cup. After the World Cup, the stadium serves as a multipurpose sports complex.

=== Other ===
A singular monument of industrial architecture is a 128 m (420 ft) open-work hyperboloid tower built on the bank of the Oka near Dzerzhinsk as part of a powerline river crossing by the eminent engineer and scientist Vladimir Shukhov in 1929.

There are also architectural buildings:

- Neustroevs-Bashkirov manor house

=== Gallery ===
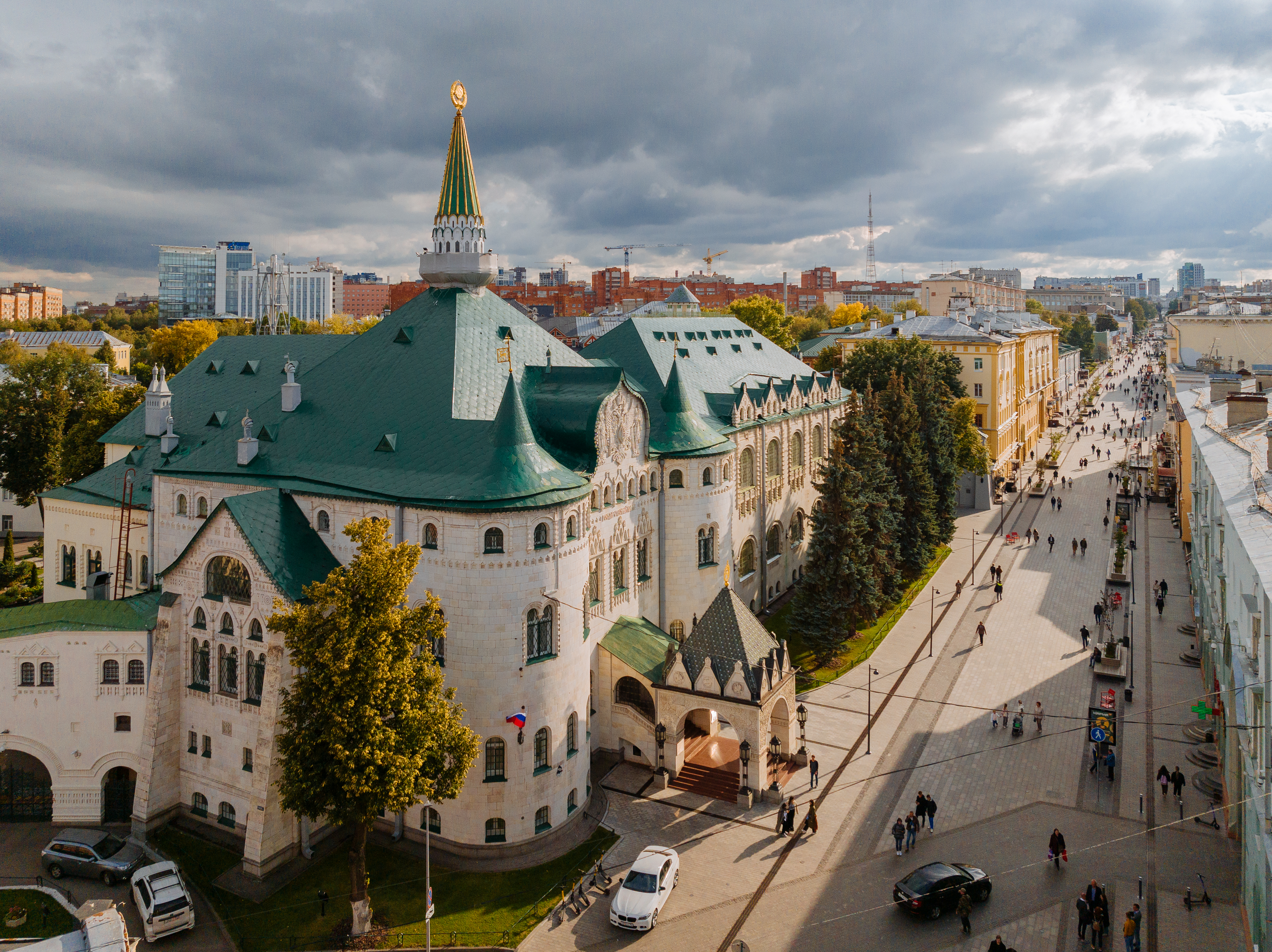
Nizhny Novgorod State bank.

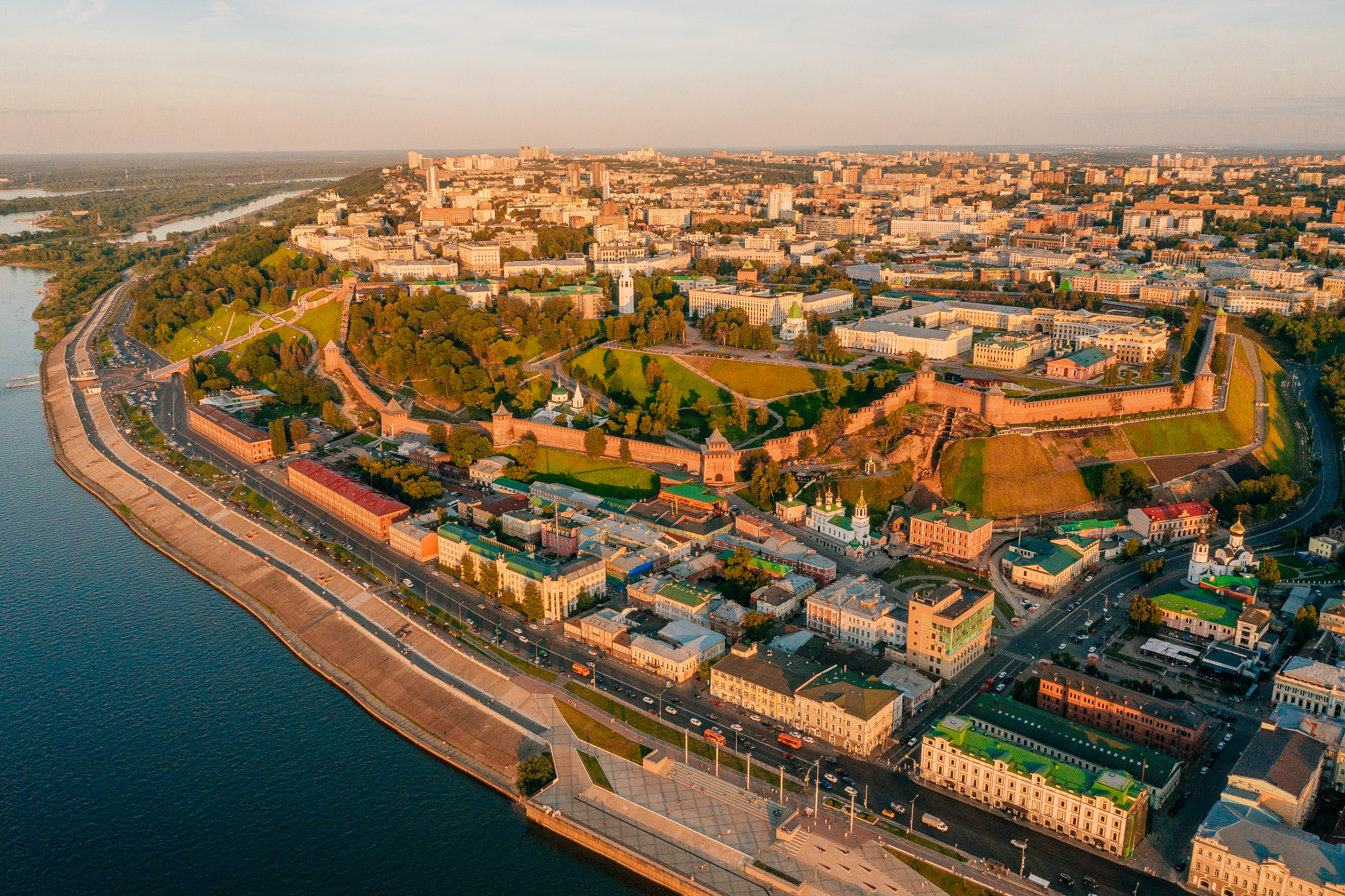
View of Nizhny Novgorod Kremlin

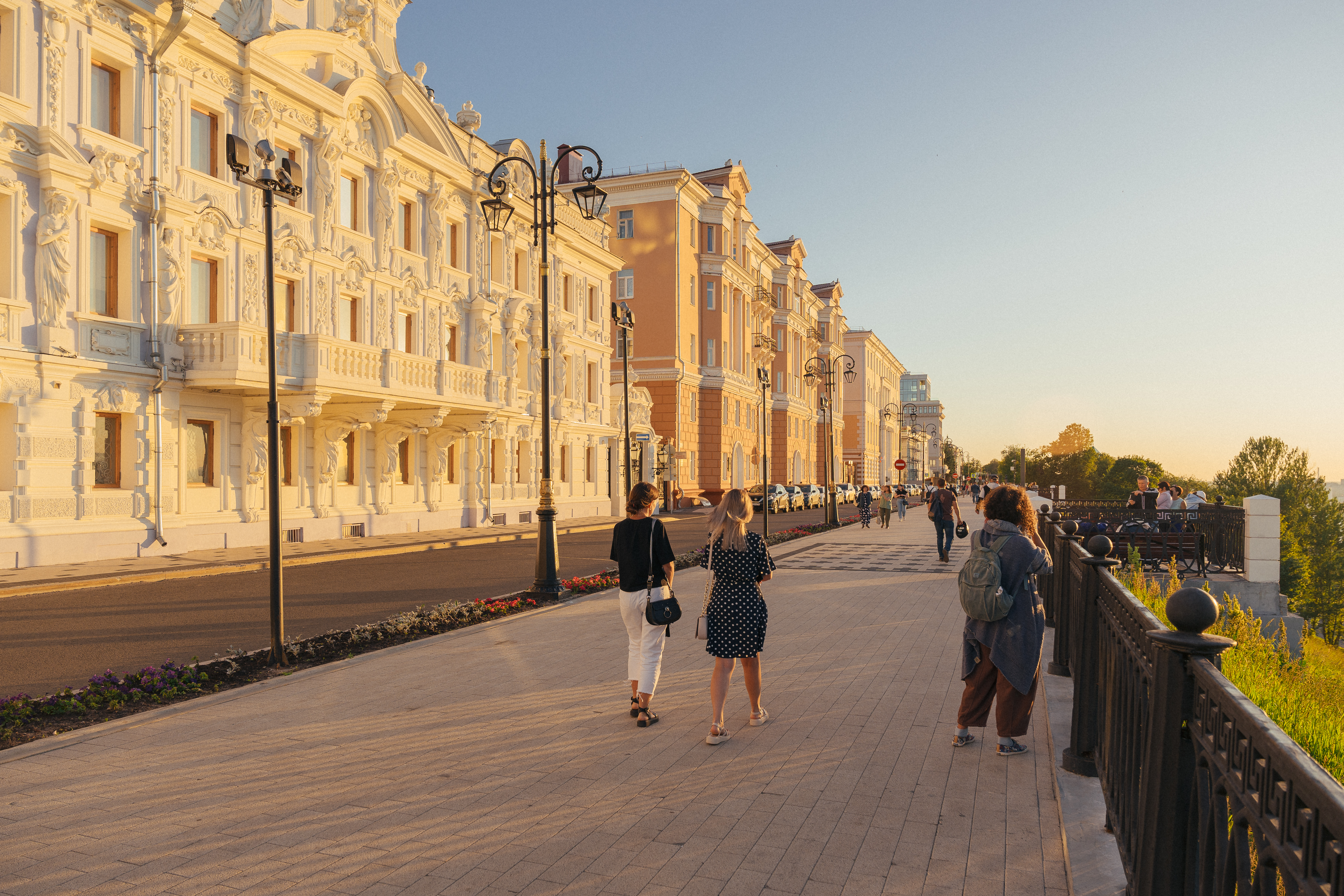
Verkhnevolzhskaya embankment.

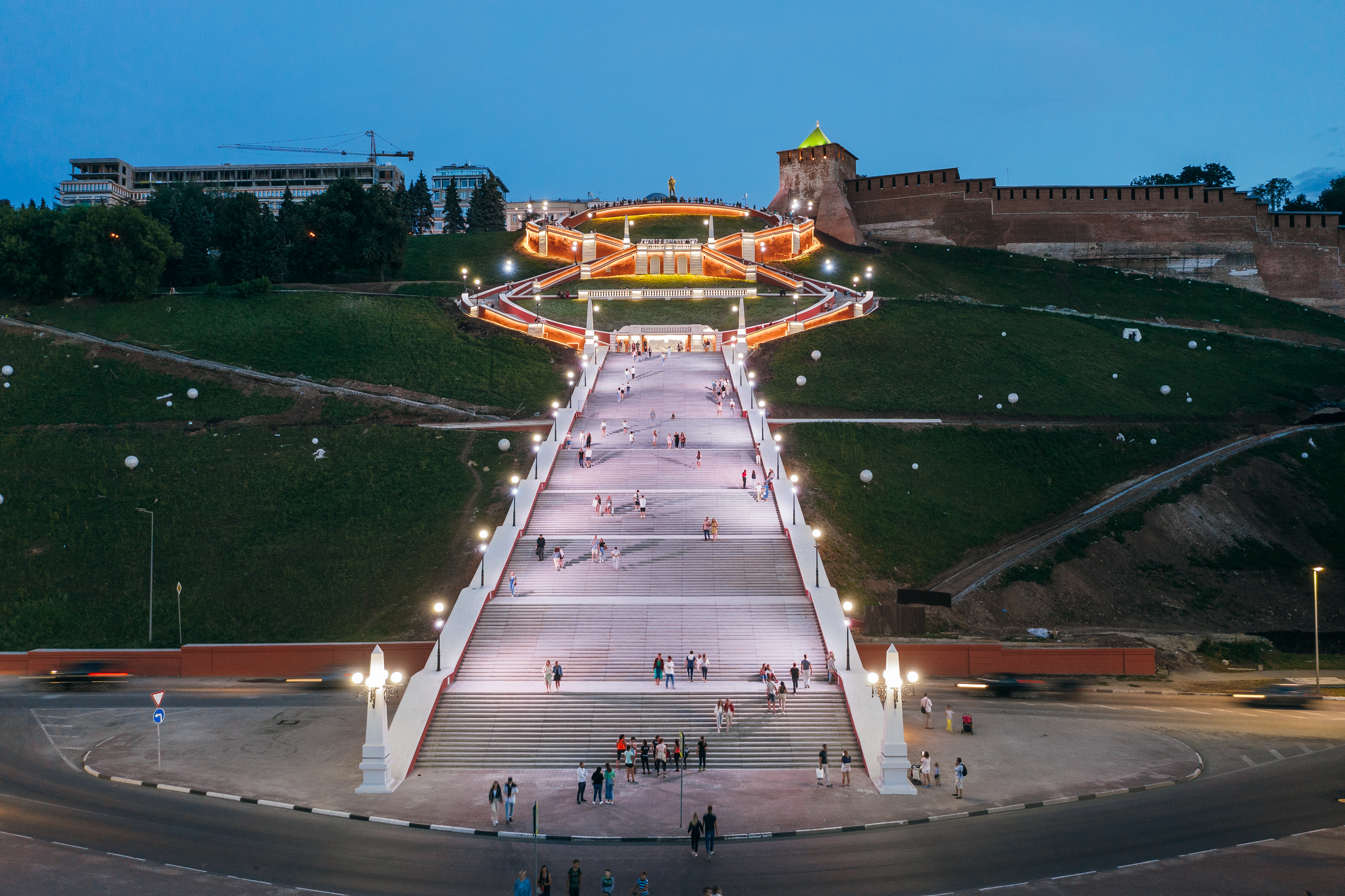
Chkalov Stairs.

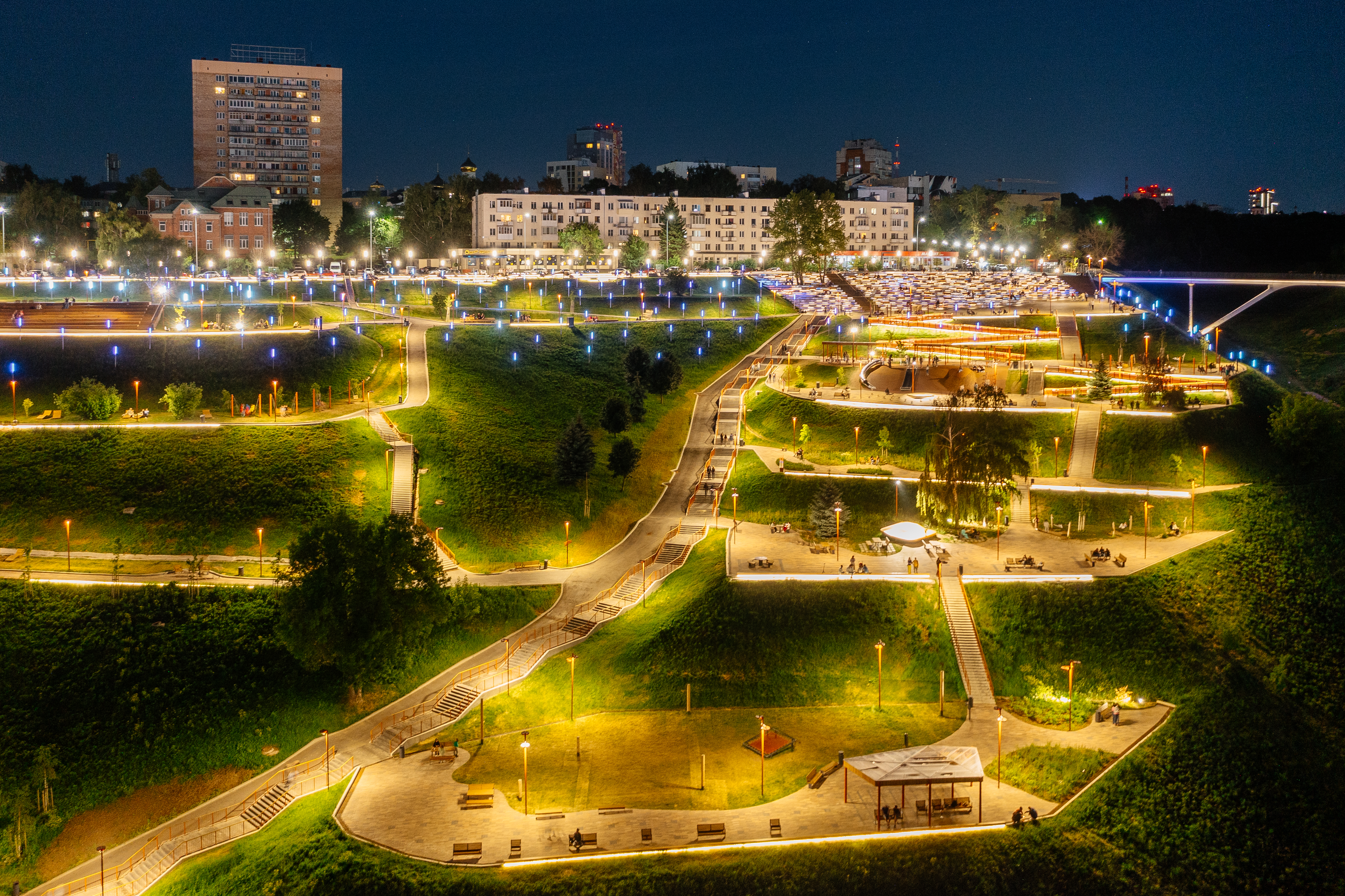
Fedorovsky embankment.

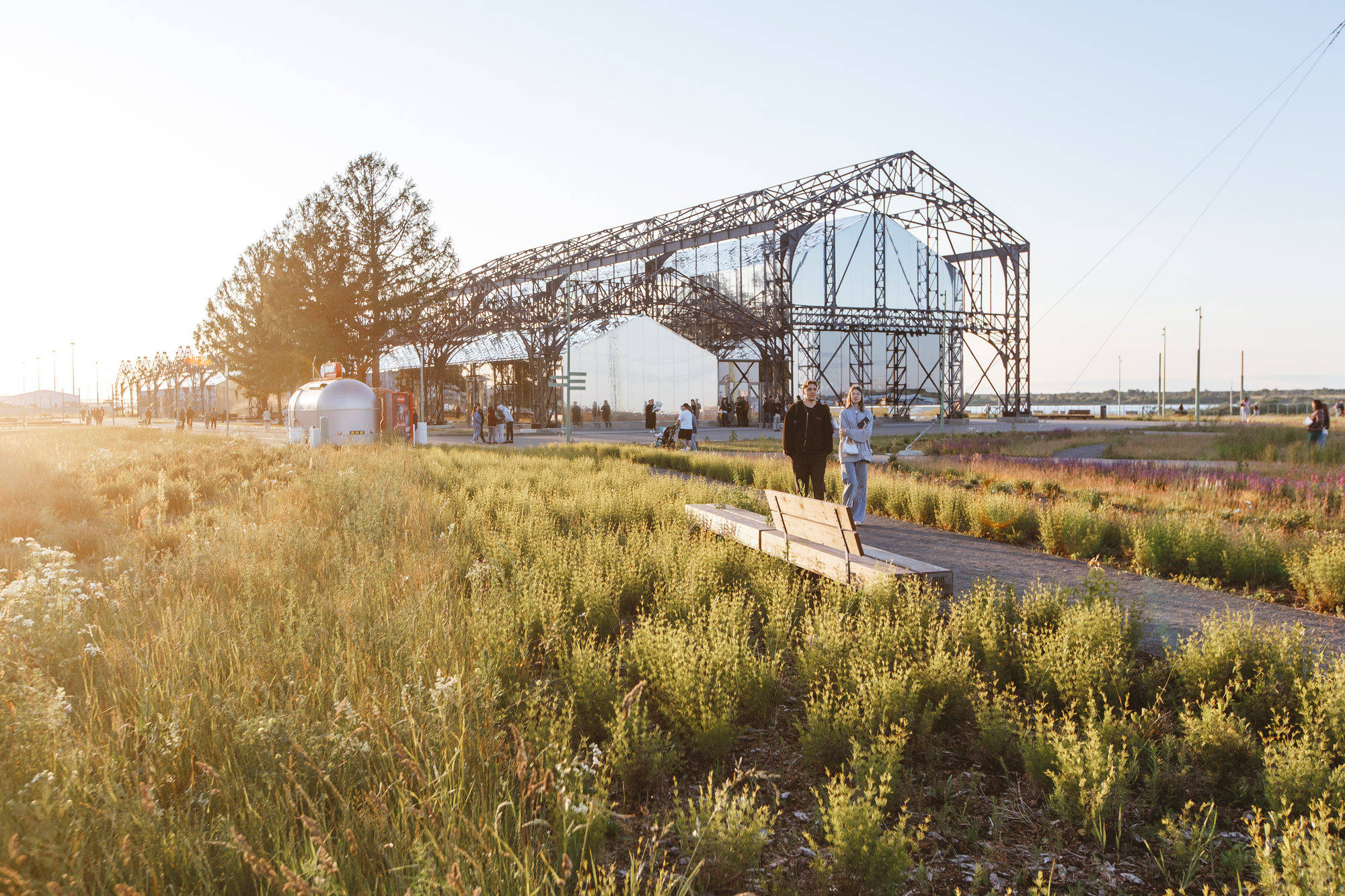
Warehouses on the Strelka (Spit) of Nizhny Novgorod.

== Education ==
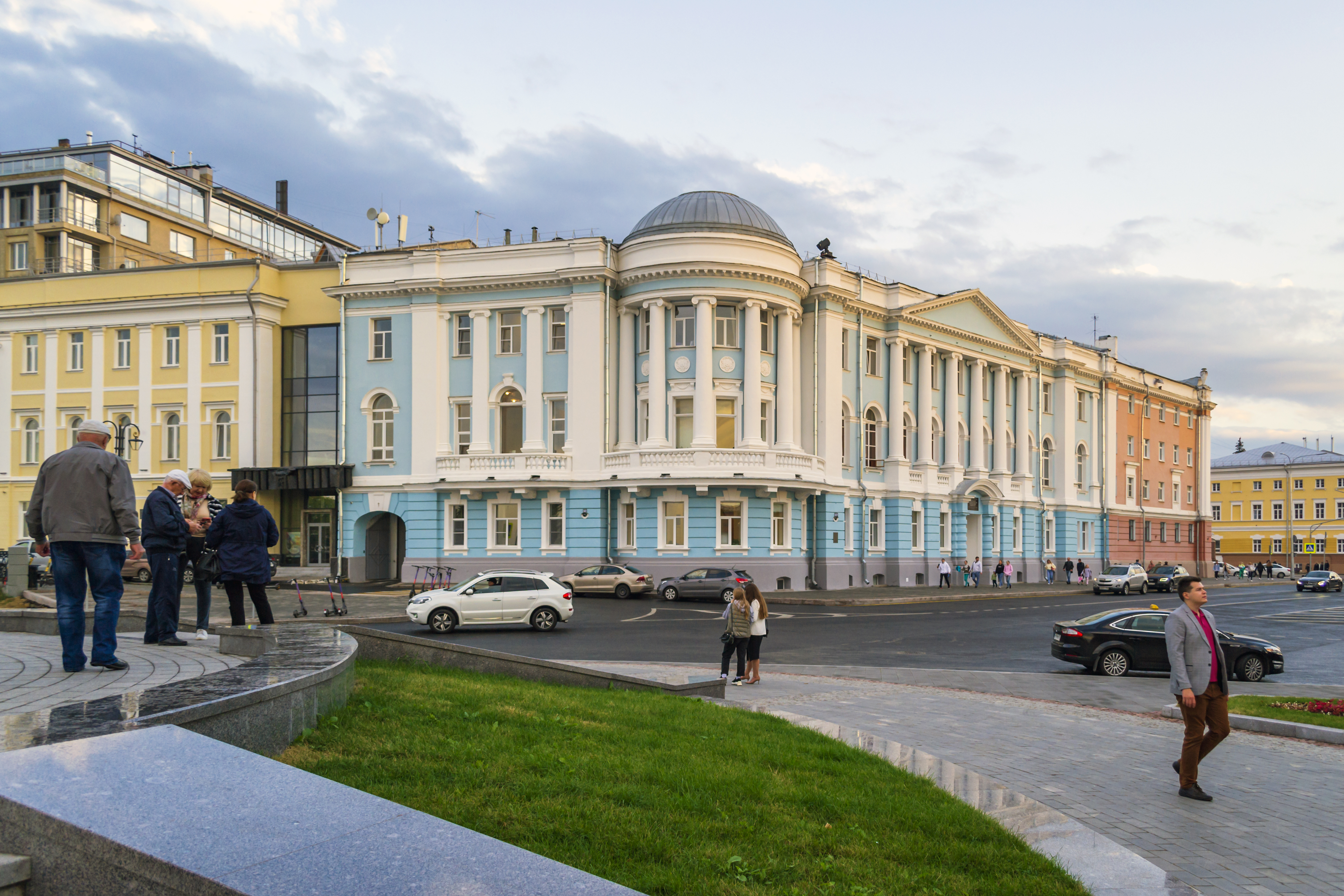
Main Entrance of Medical University

Nizhny Novgorod is home to the following educational facilities:

- N. I. Lobachevsky State University of Nizhny Novgorod
- Nizhny Novgorod State Technical University
- Research Medical University of Volga region
- Nizhny Novgorod State University of Architecture and Civil Engineering
- Nizhny Novgorod State Linguistic University
- Nizhny Novgorod State Pedagogical University
- Nizhny Novgorod State Agricultural Academy
- Volgo-Vyatsky Region Civil Service Academy

There are also twenty research institutes located in the city.

== Sports ==
Several sports clubs are active in the city:

Club	Sport	Founded	Current league	League Rank	Stadium
FC Nizhny Novgorod	Football	2015	Russian Premier League	1st	Nizhny Novgorod Stadium
Torpedo Nizhny Novgorod	Ice hockey	1946	Kontinental Hockey League	1st	Trade Union Sport Palace
Start Nizhny Novgorod	Bandy	1932	Bandy Super League	1st	Start Stadium
BC Nizhny Novgorod	Basketball	2000	VTB United League	1st	Trade Union Sport Palace
ASC	Volleyball	2016	Major League A	2nd	FOK Zarechye
Sparta	Volleyball	2000	Women's Volleyball Supreme League A	2nd	FOK Zarechye
Futbol-Hokkey NN	Futsal	1996	Futsal Supreme League	2nd	FOK Krasnaya Gorka

=== 2018 FIFA World Cup ===
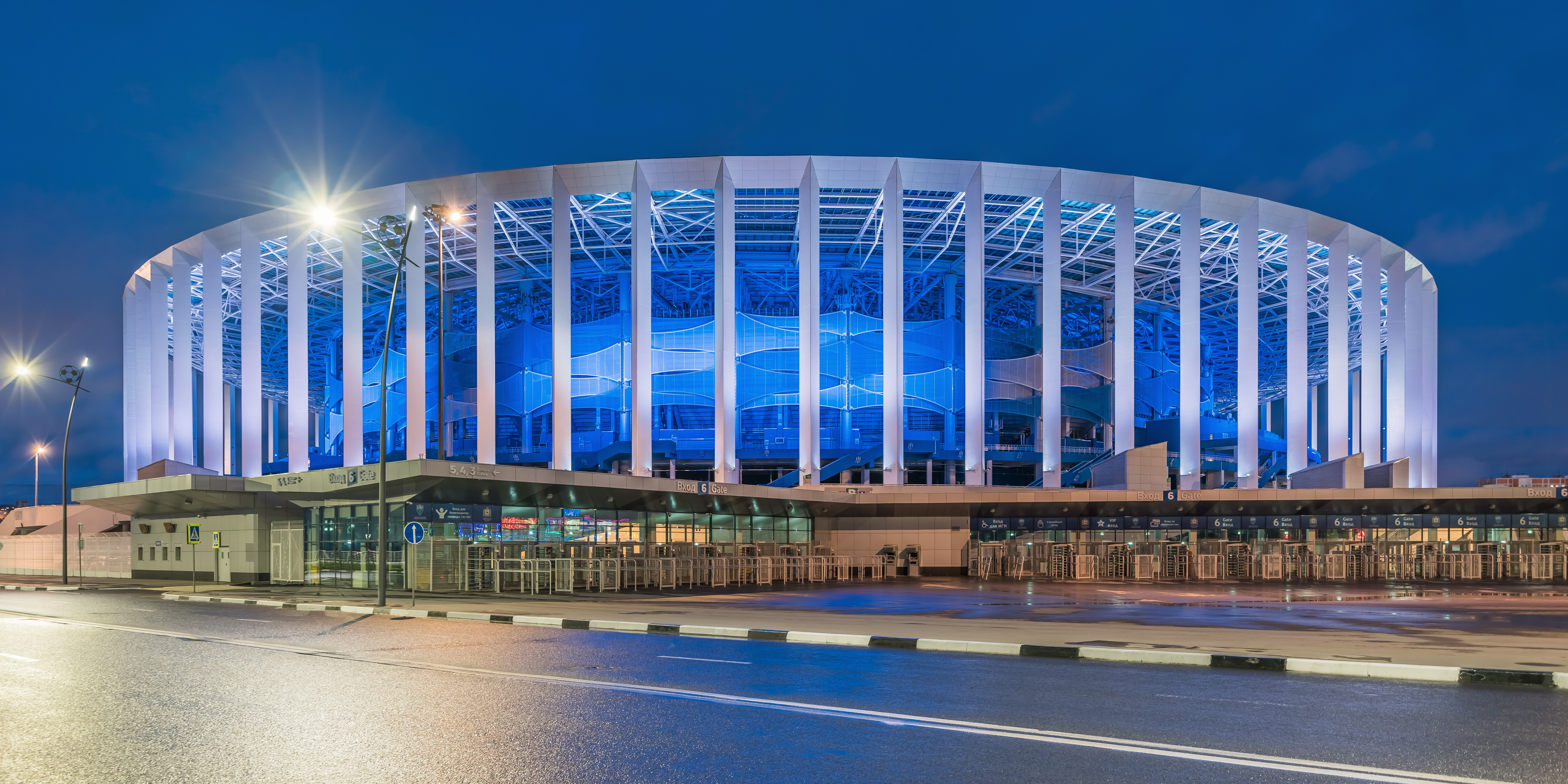
The Nizhny Novgorod Stadium hosted the 2018 FIFA World Cup games

Russia hosted the 2018 FIFA World Cup, and six matches were played at the new Nizhny Novgorod Stadium. The stadium is built beside the confluence of the Volga and Oka rivers and has a capacity of 44,899 people. The stadium hosted six matches of the FIFA World Cup:

- 18 June 2018 15:00 Sweden – South Korea, Group F
- 21 June 2018 21:00 Argentina – Croatia, Group D
- 24 June 2018 15:00 England – Panama, Group G
- 27 June 2018 21:00 Switzerland – Costa Rica, Group E
- 1 July 2018 21:00 Croatia – Denmark Round of 16
- 6 July 17:00, Uruguay – France Quarter-finals

During the World Cup, the Minin and Pozharsky Square hosted the FIFA Fan Fest. The venue was open on game days from 13.00 till 00.00. The Fan Fest venue included a hospitality area, a folk art craft shop, and food outlets (20 stationary and 7 mobile outlets). The games were broadcast on a big screen.

== Media ==
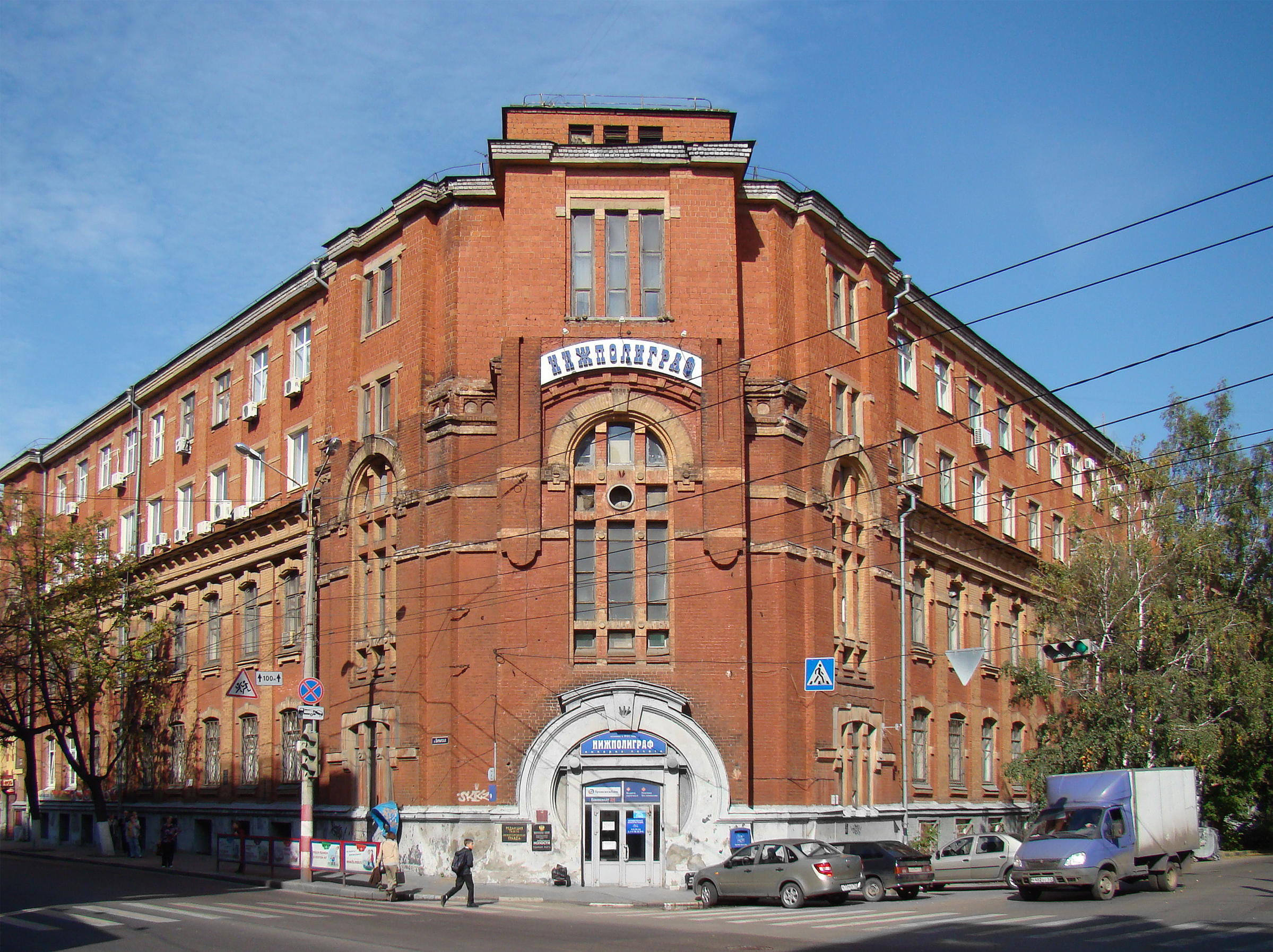
Nizhpoligraf - Polygraphic industrial and Publishing centre

Nizhny Novgorod is the centre of television and radio broadcasting in the region and the Volga Federal District. There are local TV stations, the Internet, and print media.

=== Newspapers ===
In the city, there are some popular urban newspapers. Nizhegorodskaya Pravda, Stolitsa Nizhny and Nizhegorodsky rabochiy are Russian-language media headquartered in Nizhny Novgorod. Nizhegorodskaya pravda is the oldest newspaper of the city.

=== TV and radio ===
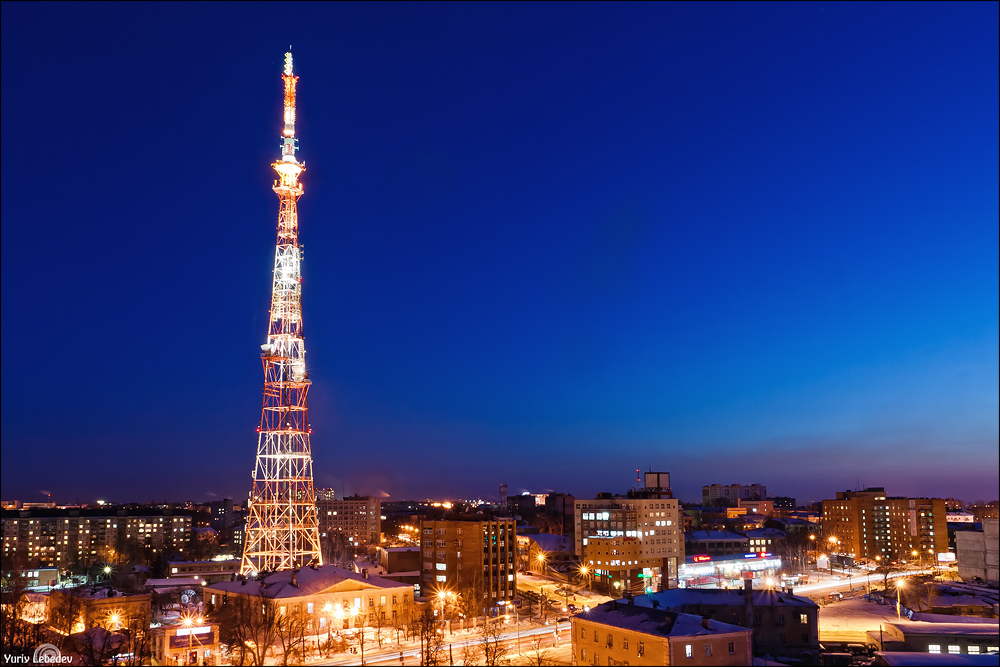
View of TV-Tower

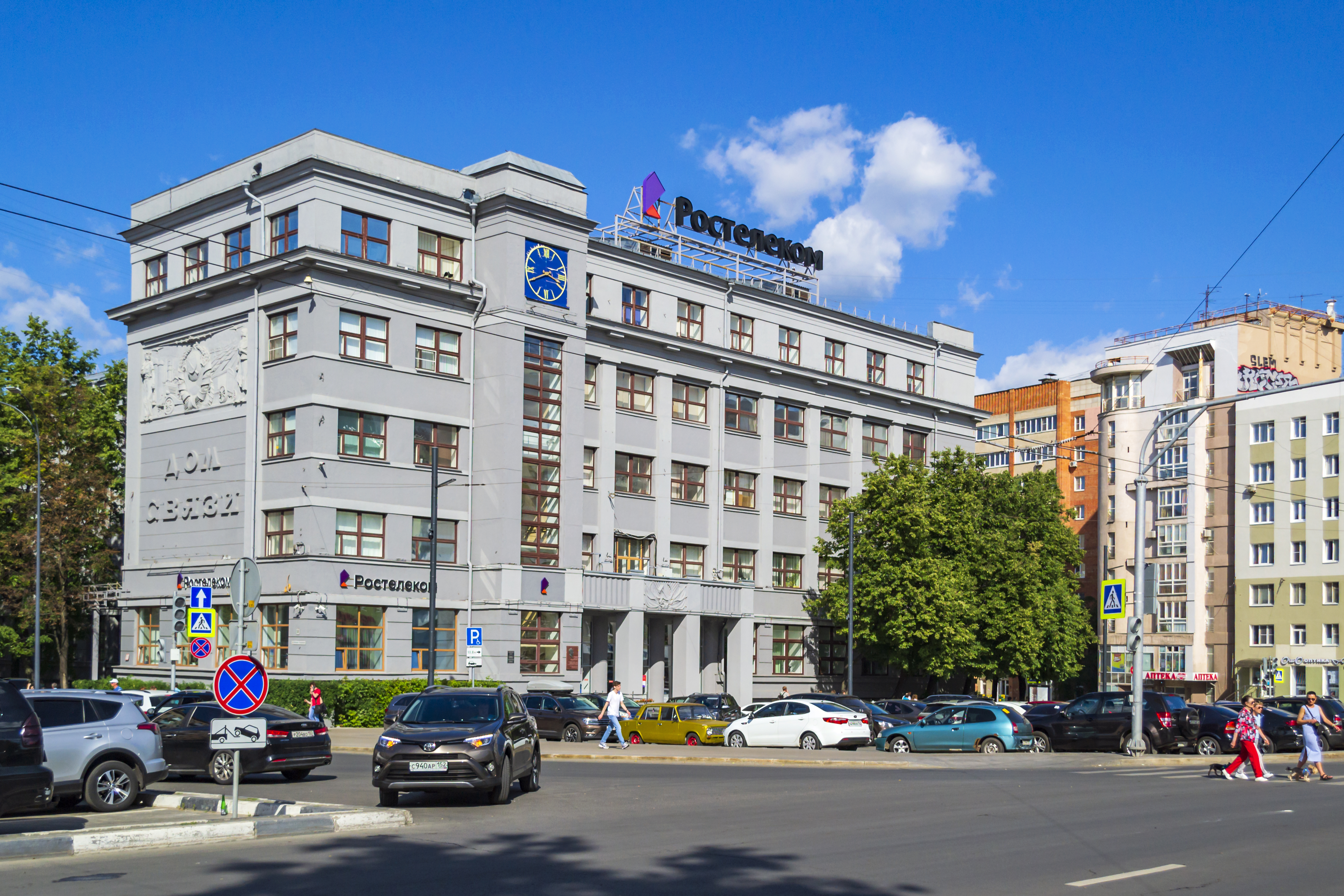
Communications House, Central Post Office and Headquarters of Rostelecom

One of the first TV channels in the city was NNTV. It was created during the Soviet period, on the basis of the Gorky television. Also, there is the TV channel Volga. The earlier existing most popular TV channel, Seti-NN, stopped broadcasting in December 2015.

Nizhny Novgorod television networks:

- Channel One
- Russia-1
- Russia-2
- NTV
- TV Tsentr
- Channel 5
- Russia-K
- Russia-24
- Public Television of Russia
- REN TV
- STS
- 3ABN
- TNT
- TV-3
- Zvezda
- Domashny
- Carousel
- Peretz
- 2x2
- Pyatnica!
- Disney Channel
- RBC
- RU.TV
- STRC Nizhny Novgorod
- NNTV
- Volga

Nizhny Novgorod radio stations:

- 3ABN Russia Radio
- "Russian (Russkoye) Radio"
- "Europa Plus"
- "DFM"
- "NRJ (Russia)"
- "Radio Maximum"
- "Obraz"
- "NN-Radio"
- "Comedy Radio"
- "Love Radio"
- "Pioneer FM"
- "Radio Dacha"
- "Nashe Radio"
- "Radio 7"
- "Yumor FM" (until 8 September, to be replaced by "Radio RBC")
- "Retro FM"
- "Politseiskaya Volna (Police Wave)"
- "Radio Rendez Vous"
- "Zvezda"
- "Radio Rossii"
- "Radio Mayak"
- "Business FM"
- "Autoradio"
- "Silver Rain"
- "Shanson"
- "Dorognoe Radio (Radio of roads)"
- "Vesti FM"
- "Kommersant FM"
- "Children's (Detskoe) Radio"
- "Radio Alla"
- "Hit FM"
- "Radio Record"

== Twin towns – sister cities ==
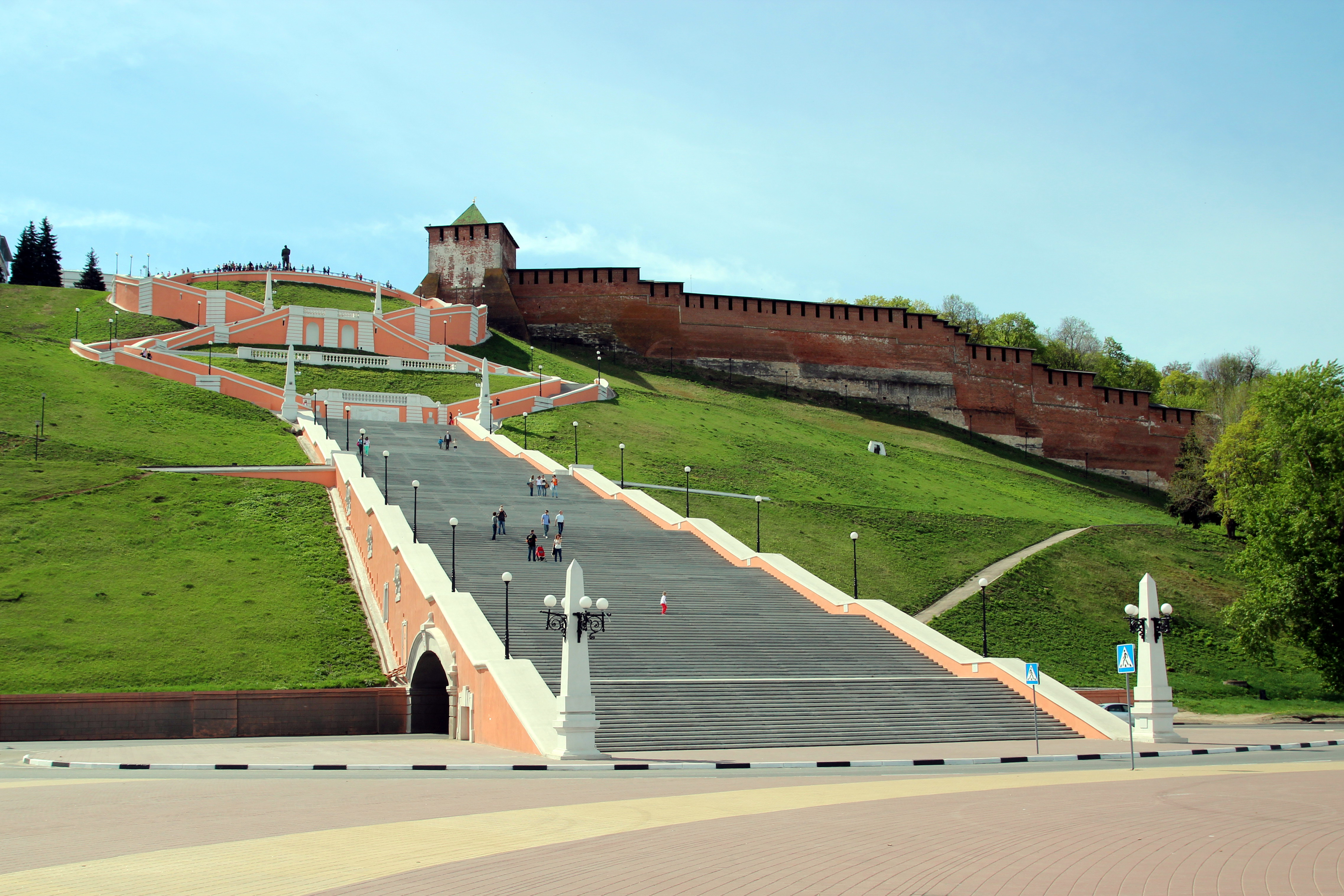
Volga riverside, Kremlin and Chkalov Stairs view

Nizhny Novgorod is twinned with:

- Bălți, Moldova
- Dobrich, Bulgaria
- Essen, Germany
- Győr, Hungary
- Hefei, China
- Heraklion, Greece
- Jinan, China
- Kharkiv, Ukraine
- Linz, Austria
- Matanzas, Cuba
- Minsk, Belarus
- Novi Sad, Serbia
- Philadelphia, United States
- Sant Boi de Llobregat, Spain
- (Georgia (country)) Sukhumi, Georgia
- Suwon, South Korea
- Tampere, Finland
- Istočno Sarajevo, Bosnia and Herzegovina

== Bibliography ==
Vlasov, Andrey (2018). Nizhny Novgorod. Photravel; Hard Cover ed. edition. ISBN 978-0998240299.
