= Spit of Nizhny Novgorod =

- Стрелка Нижнего Новгорода (Russian)
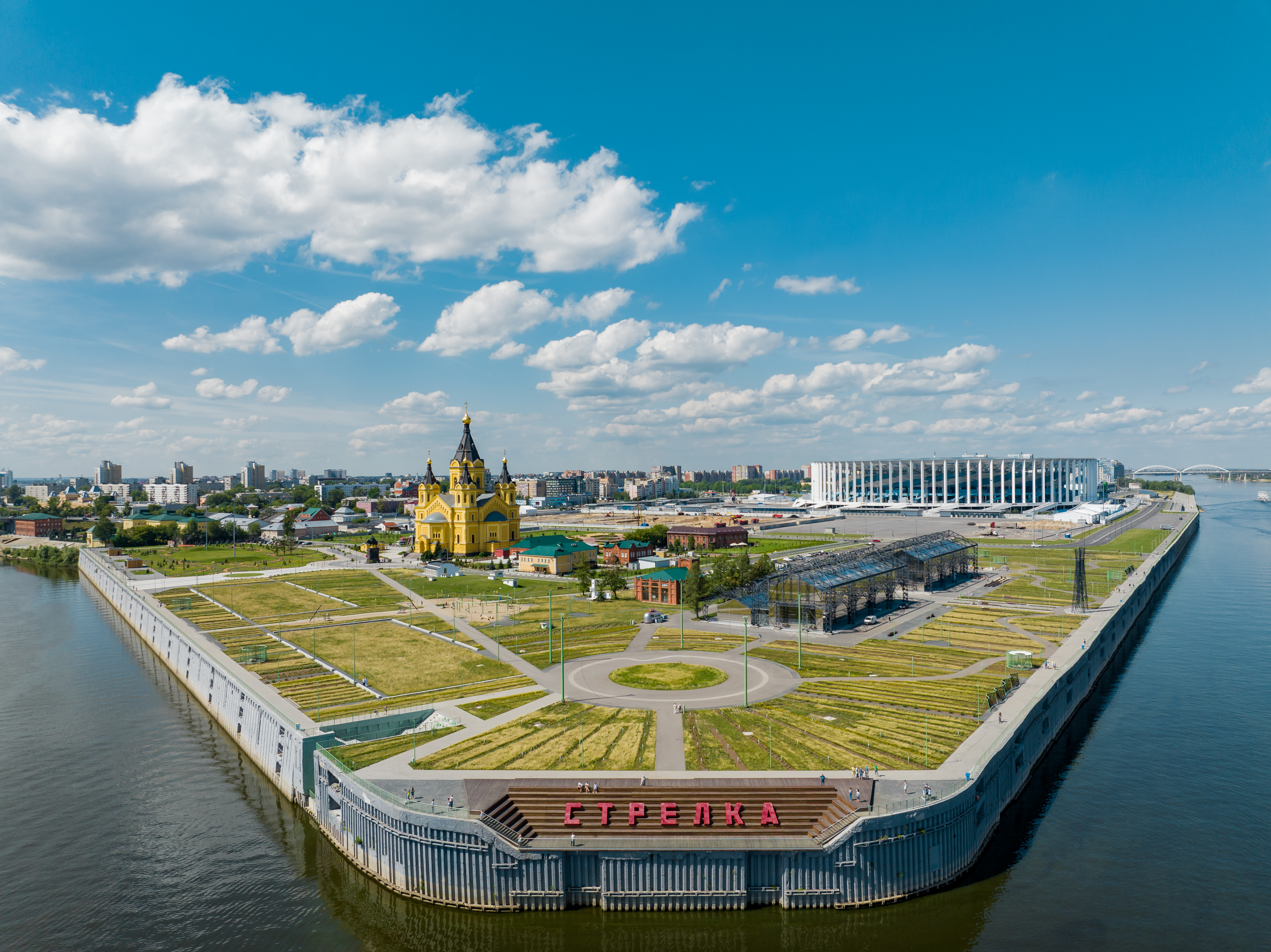
- The Spit

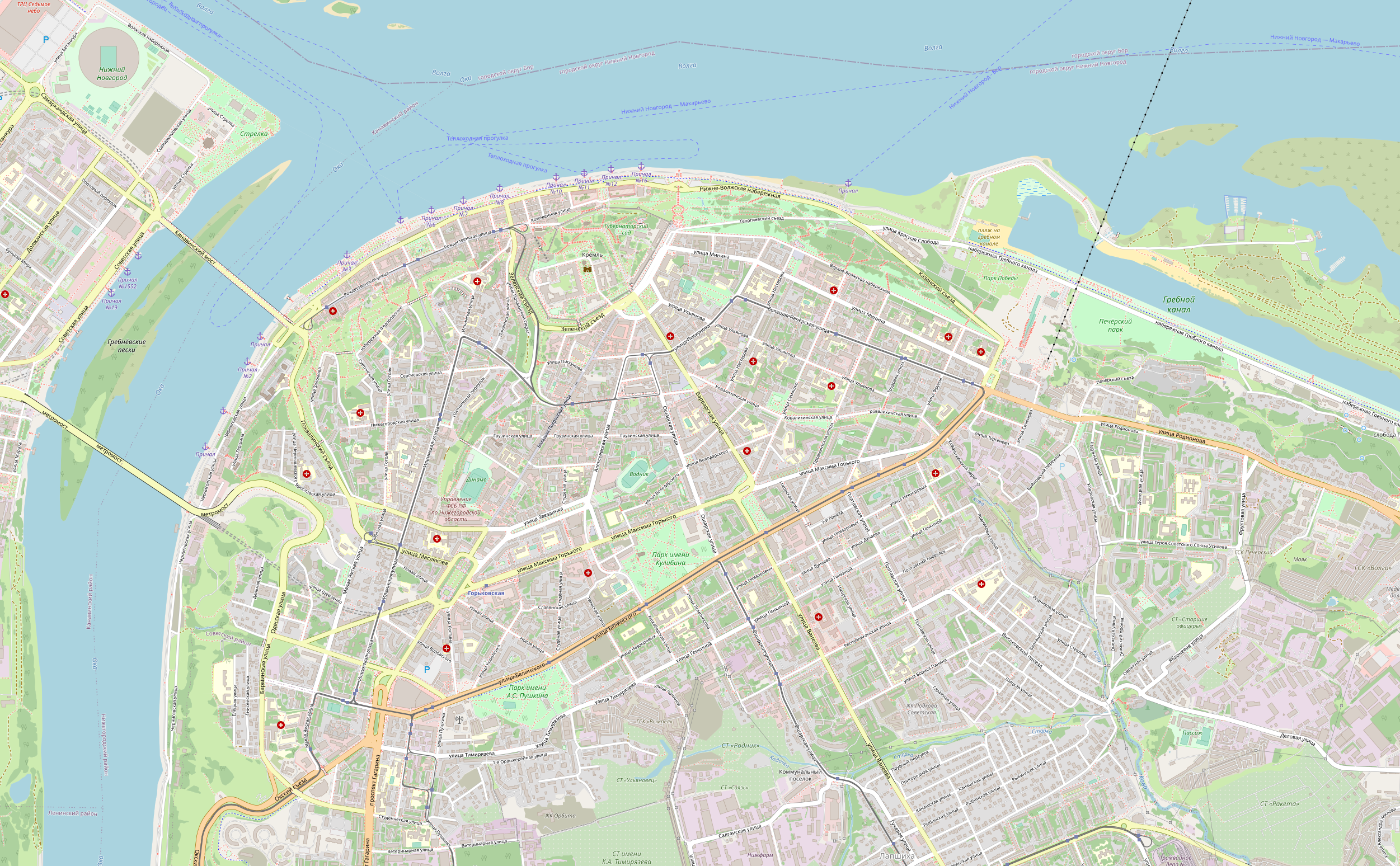
- Location within Nizhny Novgorod
- 56.334325°N 43.973227°E
- Type: River port
- Location: Nizhny Novgorod, Russia

History
- Built: 16th century
- Rebuilt: 2018

Site notes
- Governing body: City Duma of Nizhny Novgorod

The Spit of Nizhny Novgorod (Russian: Стрелка Нижнего Новгорода, romanized: Strelka Nizhnego Novgoroda short name is the Spit or Strelka) is one of the main natural landmarks in the historical centre of Nizhny Novgorod. It is located at the confluence of the Oka and Volga rivers.

== Description ==
The Spit separates the Oka and the Volga. The Spit is also the location of the Alexander Nevsky Cathedral.

There is the Nizhny Novgorod Stadium for the 2018 FIFA World Cup on the Spit. The Strelka metro station was also launched in 2018.

== History ==
=== From the 16th to the 20th century ===
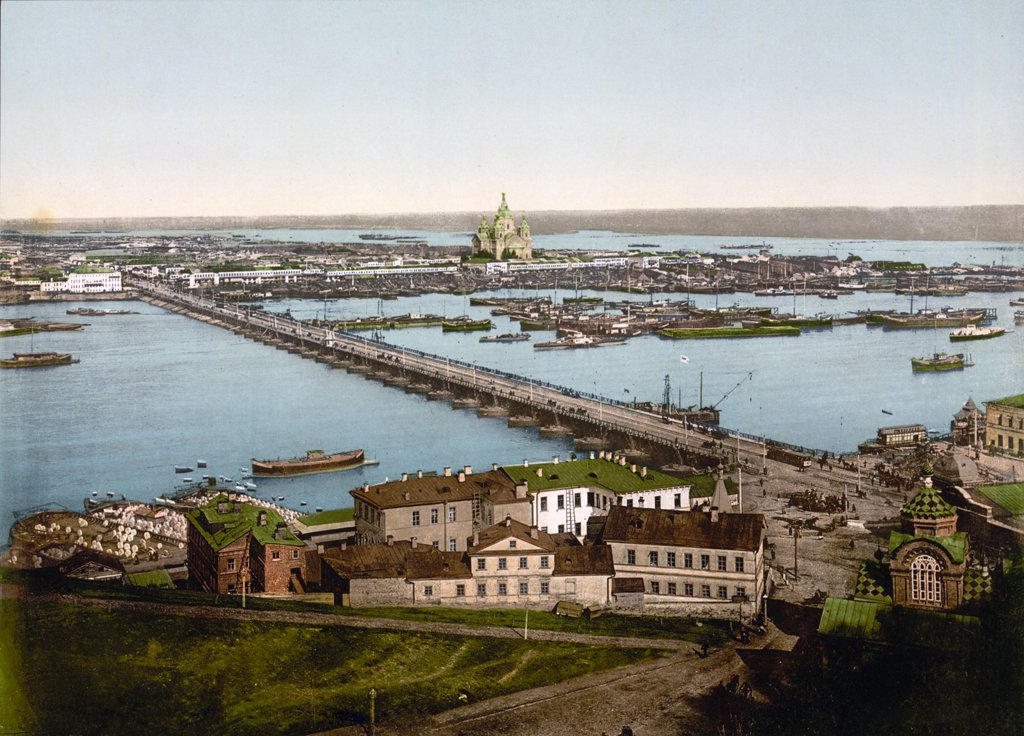
View of the Spit and Alexander Nevsky Cathedral. Andrei Karelin and Ivan Shishkin. 1880.

In the times of the Russian Tsardom, the Spit (Strelka) was the center of the Strelitzky camp of Nizhny Novgorod Uyezd, thereby receiving its name. Later the river port began to form here. This place was convenient for the unloading and loading of cargo and merchant ships arriving in Nizhny Novgorod along the Oka and Volga. A low place, at the intersection of two rivers, became more profitable for the construction of berths than the high Nizhny Novgorod hill.

During the time of the Russian Empire, St. Petersburg piers from the Oka side were added to the piers on the Volga shore. A new stage in the development of the river port on the Spit was the transfer of the fair from Makariev in 1817. In 1880, the Alexander Nevsky Cathedral was built on the Spit. Also it was called New Fair. During the All-Russia Exhibition in 1896, there were built guest houses and exhibition pavilions. Also, the first tram was opened, connecting the city with the fair.

=== The Soviet period ===
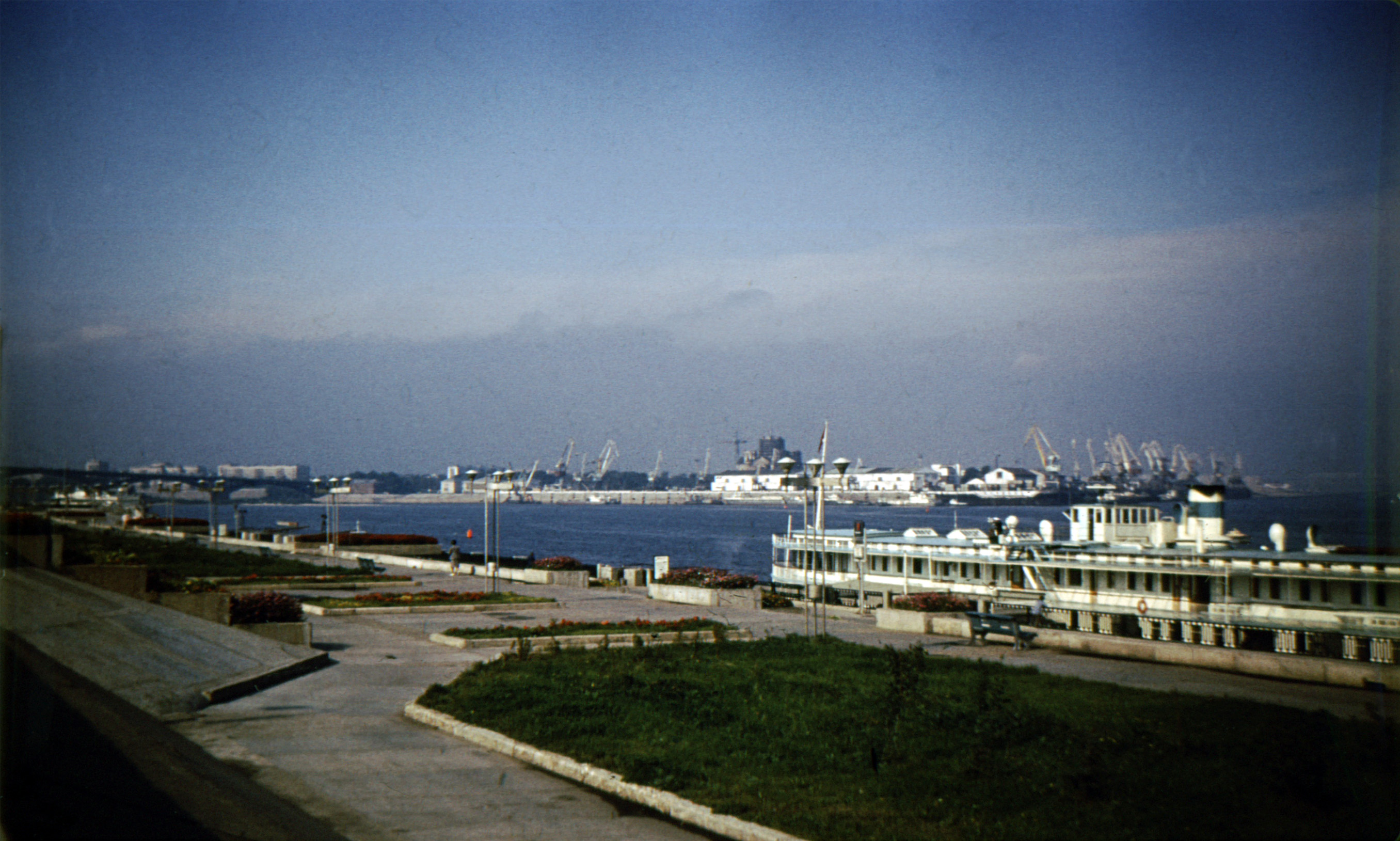
The Spit in the Soviet period. A dark gray building in the center is the former Alexander Nevsky Cathedral, converted into a warehouse. 1985.

During the Soviet Union, there have been major changes in the territory of the Spit. February 5, 1918, the administration of wharves was established. In 1932 a large cargo port was built on this territory. Also, in the late 1930s, the destruction of Alexander Nevsky Cathedral began. On the site of the cathedral it was planned to build a giant lighthouse with a monument to Vladimir Lenin from above. However, only its roof and domes were dismantled. During the entire Soviet period it was used as a warehouse and communal housing for the port workers. During the World War II on the roof of the cathedral, instead of the central dome, an anti-aircraft machine gun was installed to repel Luftwaffe attacks on the port. The Spit's defense did not allow the Germans to bombing the port territory and the Oksky (Kanavinsky) bridge. After the war, the port began to increase cargo turnover and became one of the largest in the Soviet Union. During the Cold War, a network of underground anti-nuclear bunkers was built at the Spit. In 1983, the restoration of Alexander Nevsky Cathedral began.

=== Current Russia ===
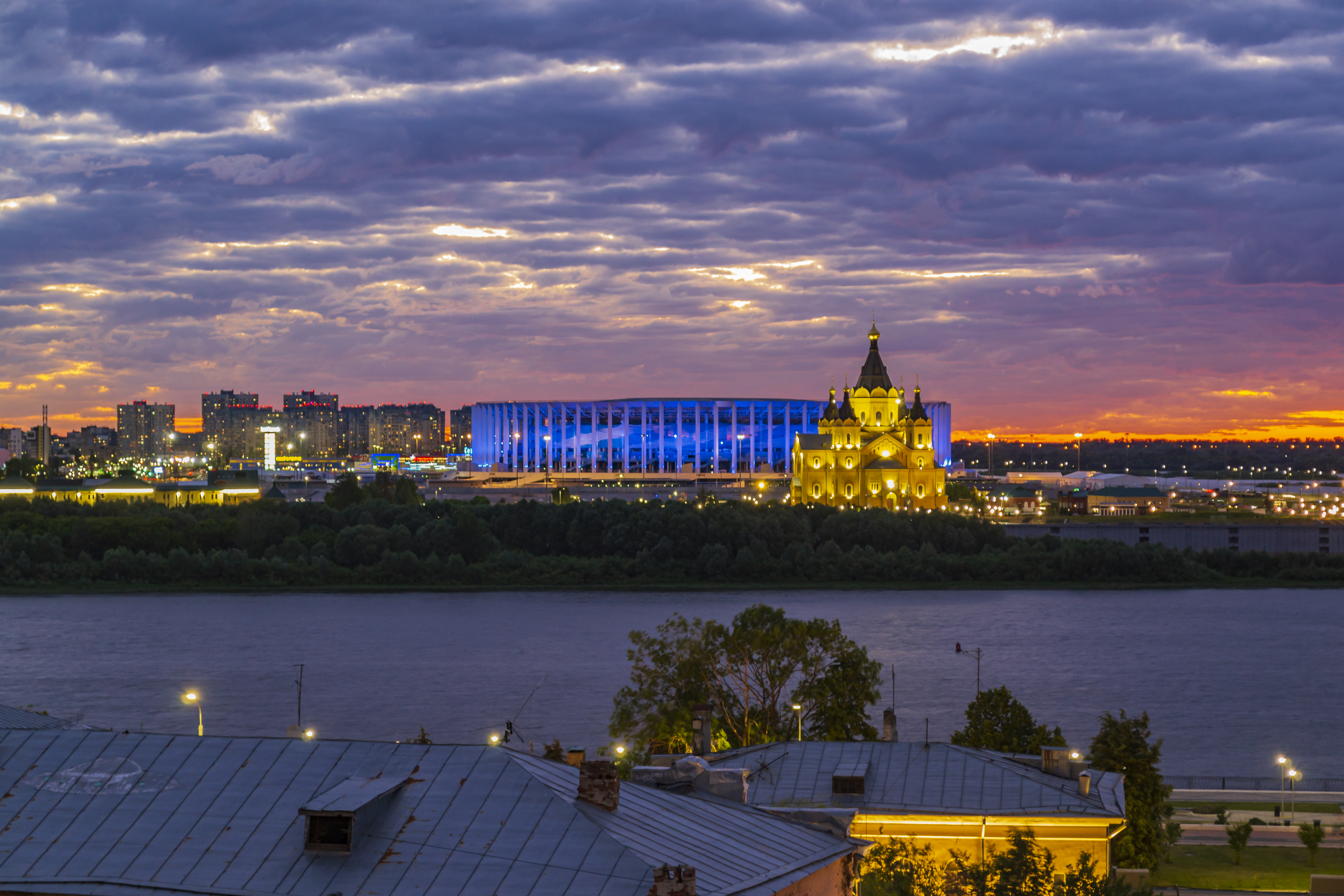
View of the Spit, Alexander Nevsky Cathedral and the Nizhny Novgorod Stadium at night. 2022

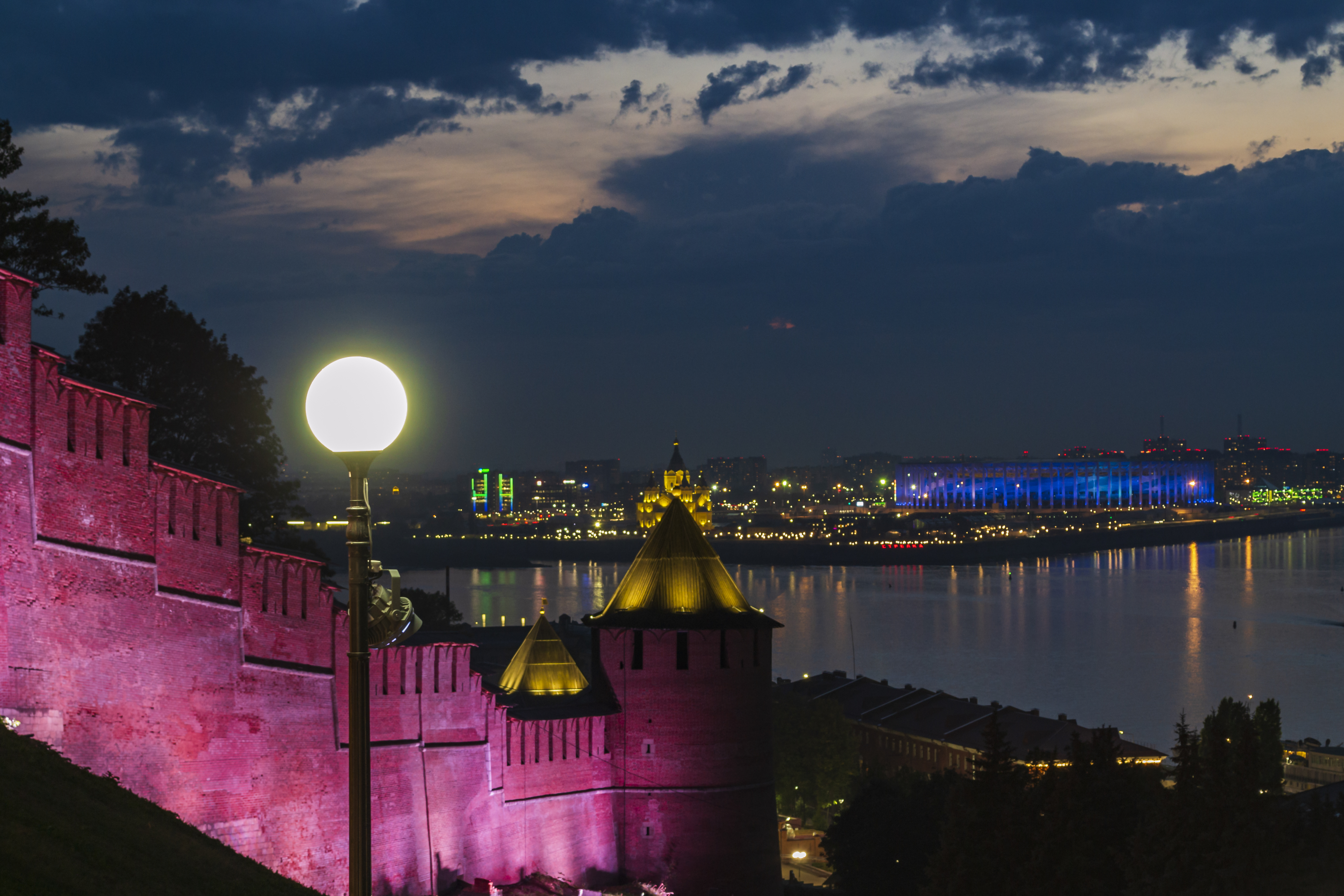
Borisoglebskaya tower of the Nizhny Novgorod Kremlin and the Spit

After the dissolution of the Soviet Union, the port on the Spit was privatized. The territory around it began to be built up by private buildings and garages. In the 90s, the city council and local residents did not care about the exterior of the Spit. The restoration of Alexander Nevsky Cathedral was completed. In the early 2000s the situation changed. The construction of a microdistrict in the wasteland near the port began. In the beginning the microdistrict Sedmoe Nebo was built, a hypermarket of the same name opened a little later. The development of this territory was included in the general plan of the 70s. It was planned to build residential areas and a new highway on the embankment of the Volga. On the territory continued to build new houses, roads and other infrastructure. In the beginning of 2010 there were plans for the development of the territory for the trade and business center Strelka-City. However, in 2015 it became known that the territory of the Spit will be built stadium for the 2018 FIFA World Cup and territory around it will be completely reconstructed. In the same year the river port was transferred, and its functions were distributed between the towns of Kstovo, Bor and other. Near the stadium is the construction of the Strelka metro station. The station is named after the Spit (Strelka).

During the reconstruction in the former port were discovered lacy metal structures of the All-Russia Exhibition of 1896, which were transported to the Siberian pier and converted into warehouses in 1902. The townspeople advocated the preservation of these structures in the same place and the governor supported the citizens of Nizhny Novgorod. These structures are planned to be restored and used for other purposes. August 1, 2017 were demolished old concrete warehouses, built in the 30s in the Soviet period. They had no historical value. However, the media and liberal activists presented this information as if historical warehouses with lace structures were demolished.

On November 1, 2016, the construction of a highway on the Volga embankment from Strelka along the micro district Meshcherskoe Ozero began. Designing and commencement of construction also accompanied a scandal provoked by local residents. They were again supported by the media and liberals. The inhabitants considered this territory to be their immediate place of rest and walks, and also called it an ecological zone. However, this embankment was completely destroyed and littered. This did not correspond in any way to the residents' words about a full-fledged place for recreation. In addition, the project to build a road on the Volga embankment was developed in 1977 and approved in 2010.

Another discovery was the underground bunkers built during the Cold War, in the event of a nuclear strike. They were found in December 2016. Public proposals were made on their preservation and transformation into the Museum of the Cold War.
