= Historic centre of Nizhny Novgorod =

Historic centre of Nizhny Novgorod Исторический центр Нижнего Новгорода
- Reservation
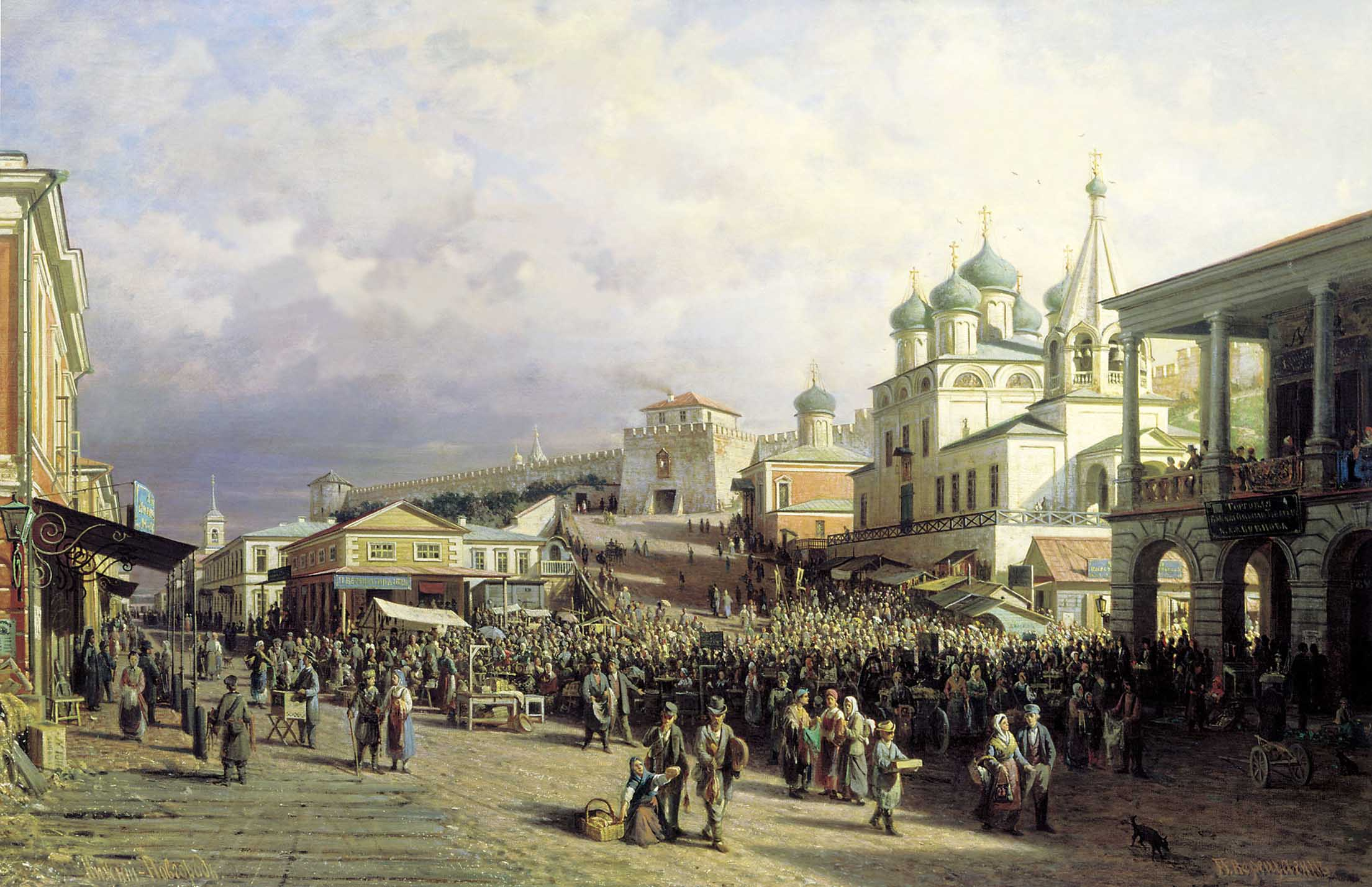
- Lower Posad and the Kremlin
- Nickname: Old city
- Interactive map of Historic centre of Nizhny Novgorod
- Coordinates: 56°19′6″N 43°59′40″E
- Country: Russia
- City: Nizhny Novgorod
- Division: Upper City

The historic centre of Nizhny Novgorod (also old Nizhny Novgorod, the old town) is the downtown of Nizhny Novgorod with historical buildings in the borders up to 1917. A number of ancient buildings, natural landmarks and historic districts are found in the area. In the old city there are buildings of different epochs and architectural styles, including Neo-Byzantine, Stroganov's Baroque, Empire, Modern. These include the medieval Kremlin, 19th-century mansions and Stalinist monumental houses.

== Sites ==
The site contains the following objects

1. Historic centre of Nizhny Novgorod (downtown);
  - The Kremlin;
  - Upper Posad;
  - The Fair;
  - The Spit (Strelka);
  - Moskovsky railway station and Revolution Square;
2. Historic centre of Sormovo;
  - The Sormovo Factory.

== Location ==
The old city is located on two hills: Kremlevsky and Ilyinsky. On the Kremlevsky hill is the Kremlin itself and the historical districts around it: the Upper and Lower Posads, the Rozhdestvenskaya Side, a complex of historical streets (for example: Bolshaya Pokrovskaya and the Varvarskaya), the Pechersky Monastery, and Pochayna River. On the Ilyinsky hill there is the territory of Zapochainye, starting from Ilinskaya street and ending with the Lyadov Square.

The old Kanavino with the Fairground and the old Sormovo are considered part of the old town, despite the fact that these settlements were included in the city after 1917. The old Kanavino includes the territory of the Fair, the Spit and the Gordeevka. There are many landmarks in this territory: the Fair and the Main Fair Building, the Moskovsky railway station with the adjacent square and the Central Department Store, the Smolensk-Vladimir Church in Gordeevka and the Gordeevsky department store, as well as many 19th-century mansions. On the eve of the World Cup in 2018, the territory of the old Kanavino underwent major reconstruction.

Old Sormovo is more remote from the historical centre. In the centre of this territory, Stalinist style buildings predominate but there are a few pre-revolutionary buildings: the Transfiguration Cathedral, Barricade School, Krasnoye Sormovo Factory and some 19th-century mansions. At the beginning of the 20th century, Sormovo was the centre of revolutionary battles in 1905, because of this, many revolutionary monuments are located on this territory.

== Gallery ==
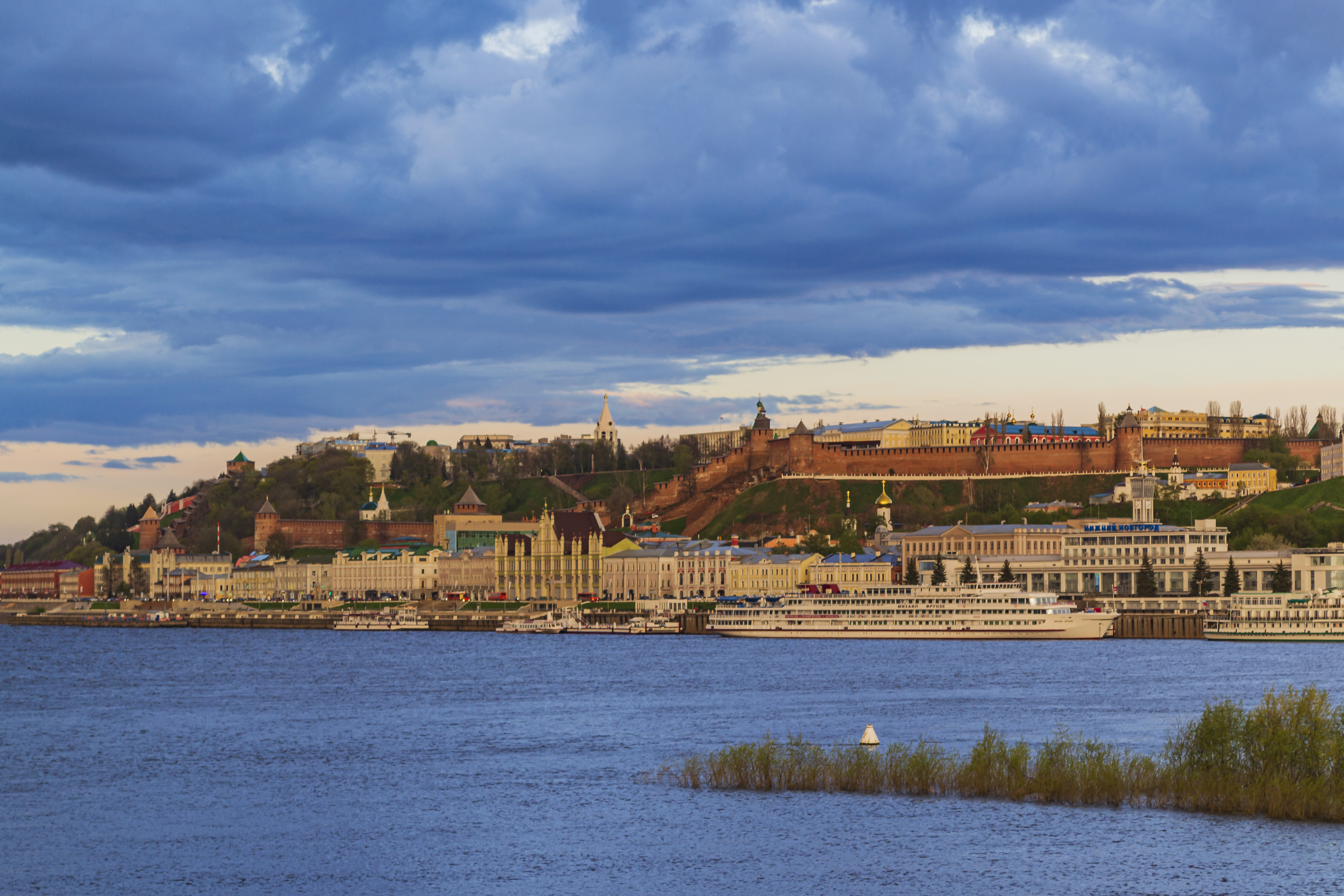
The Kremlin

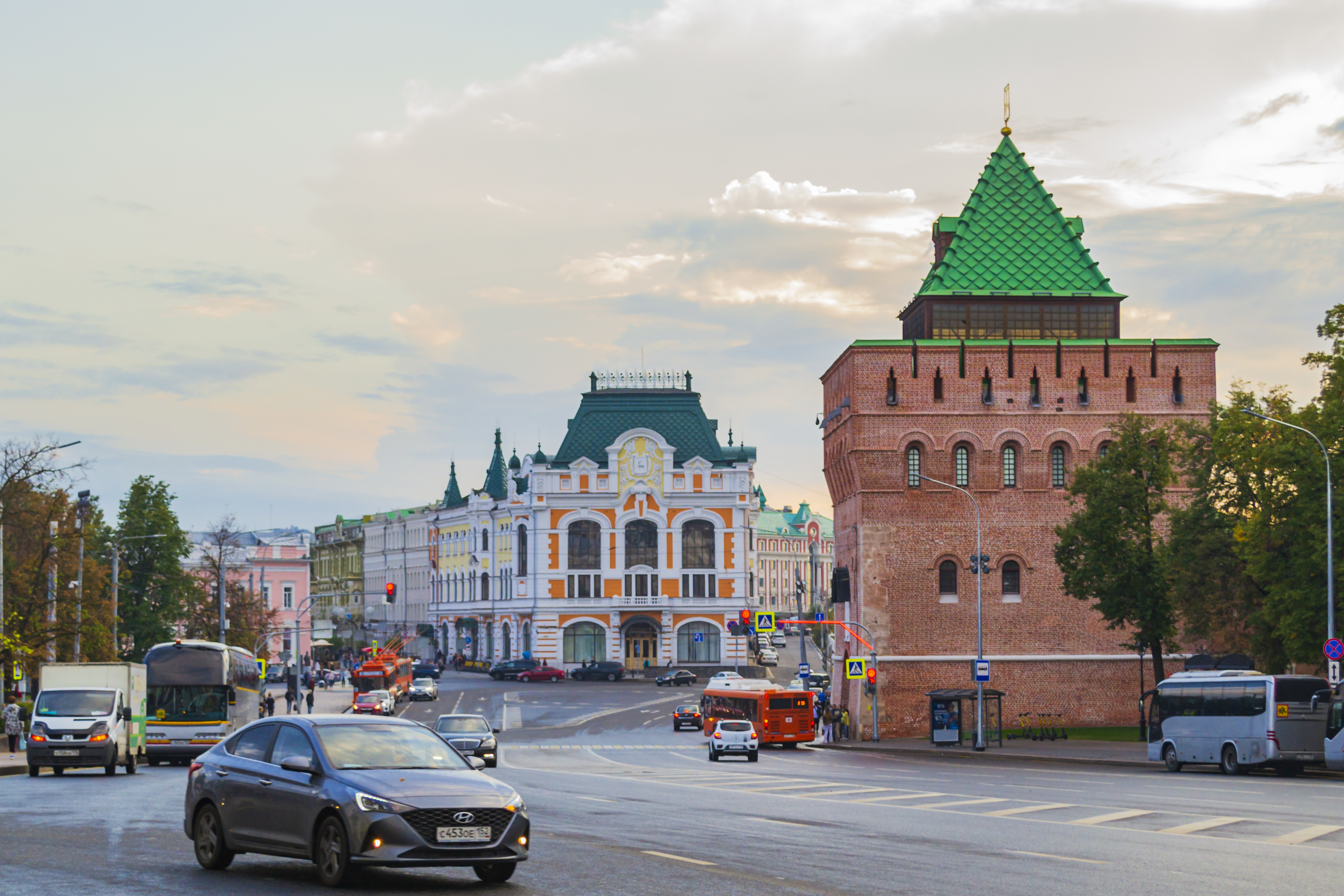
Minin Square (Upper Posad)

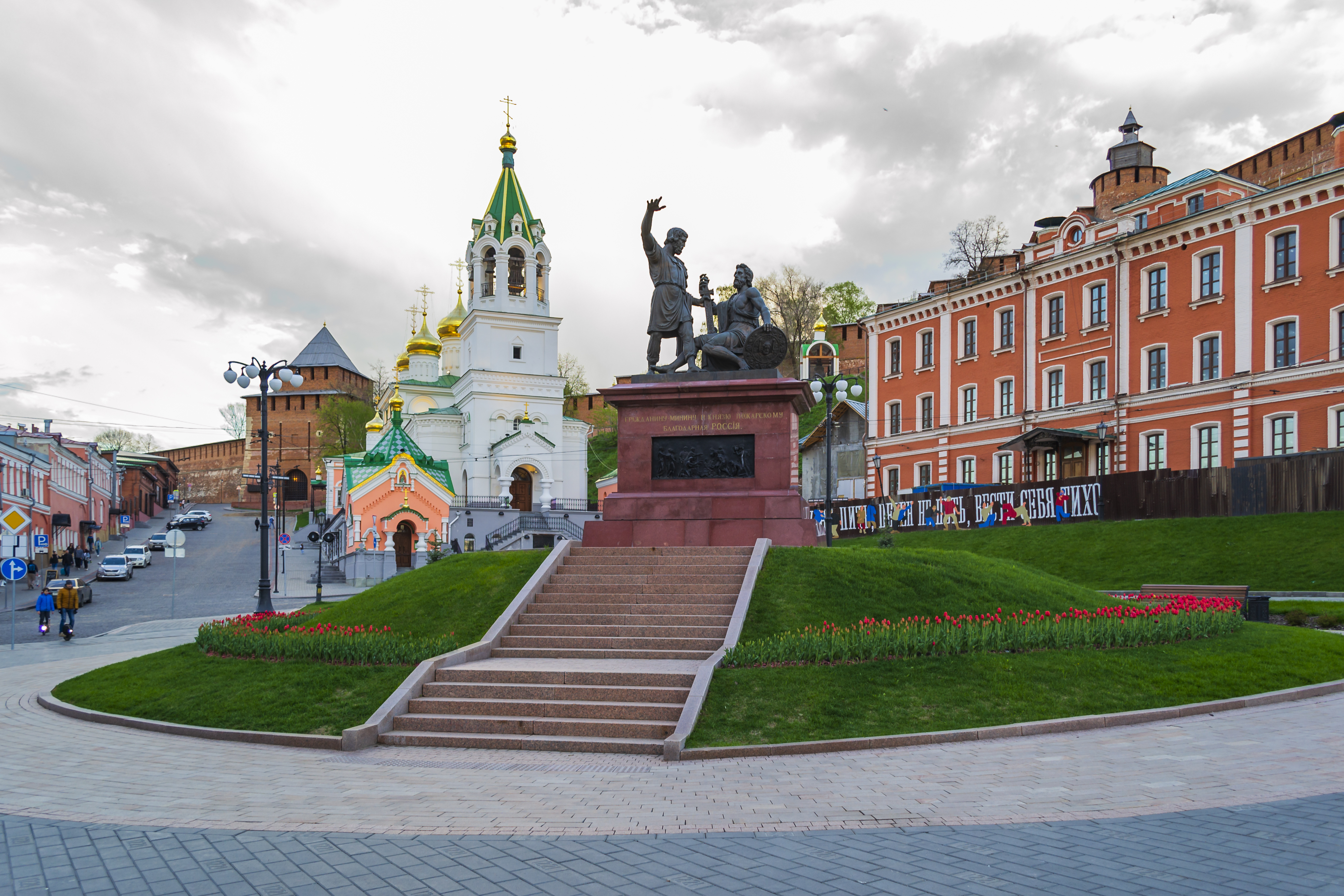
National Unity Square (Lower Posad)

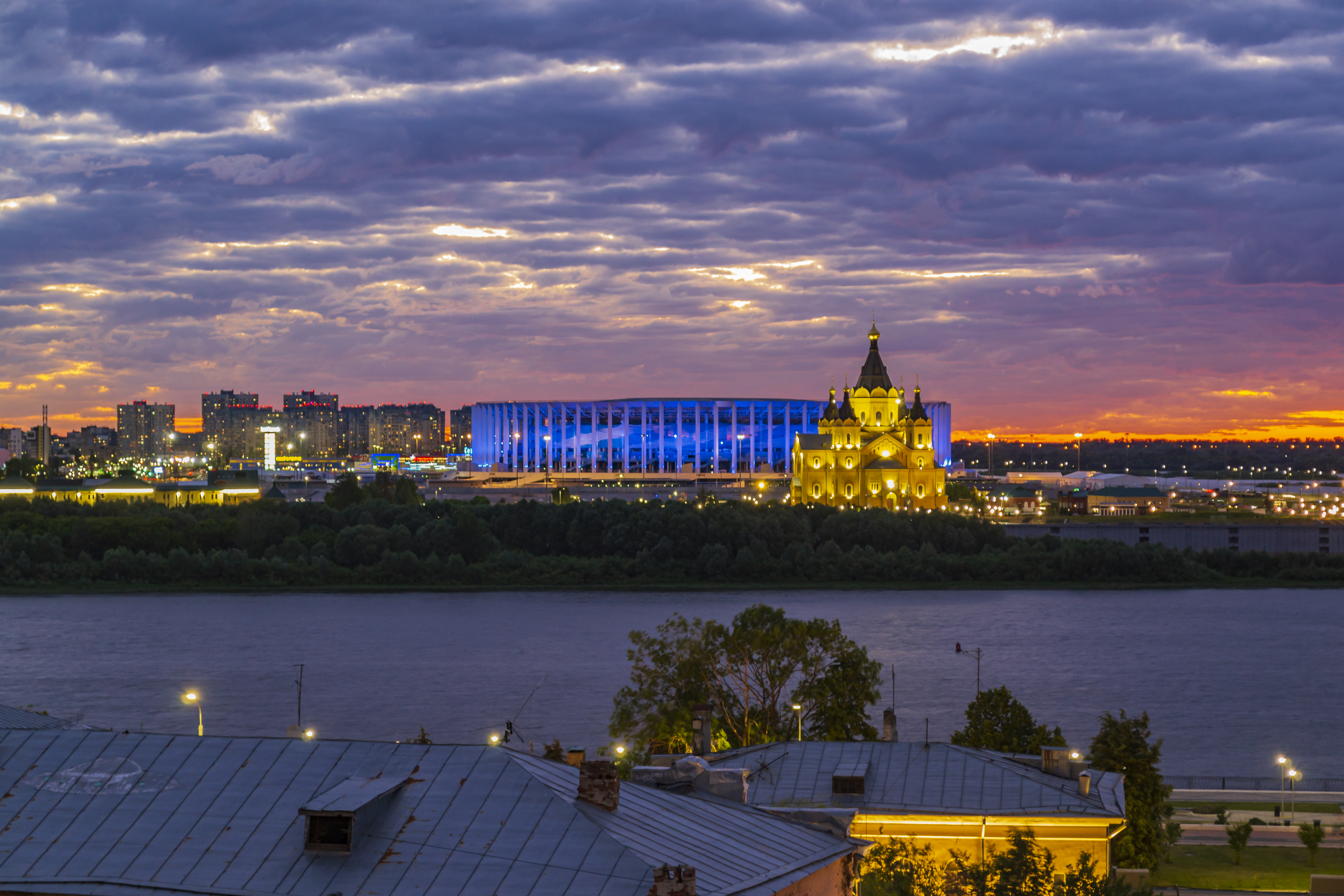
The Spit (Strelka)

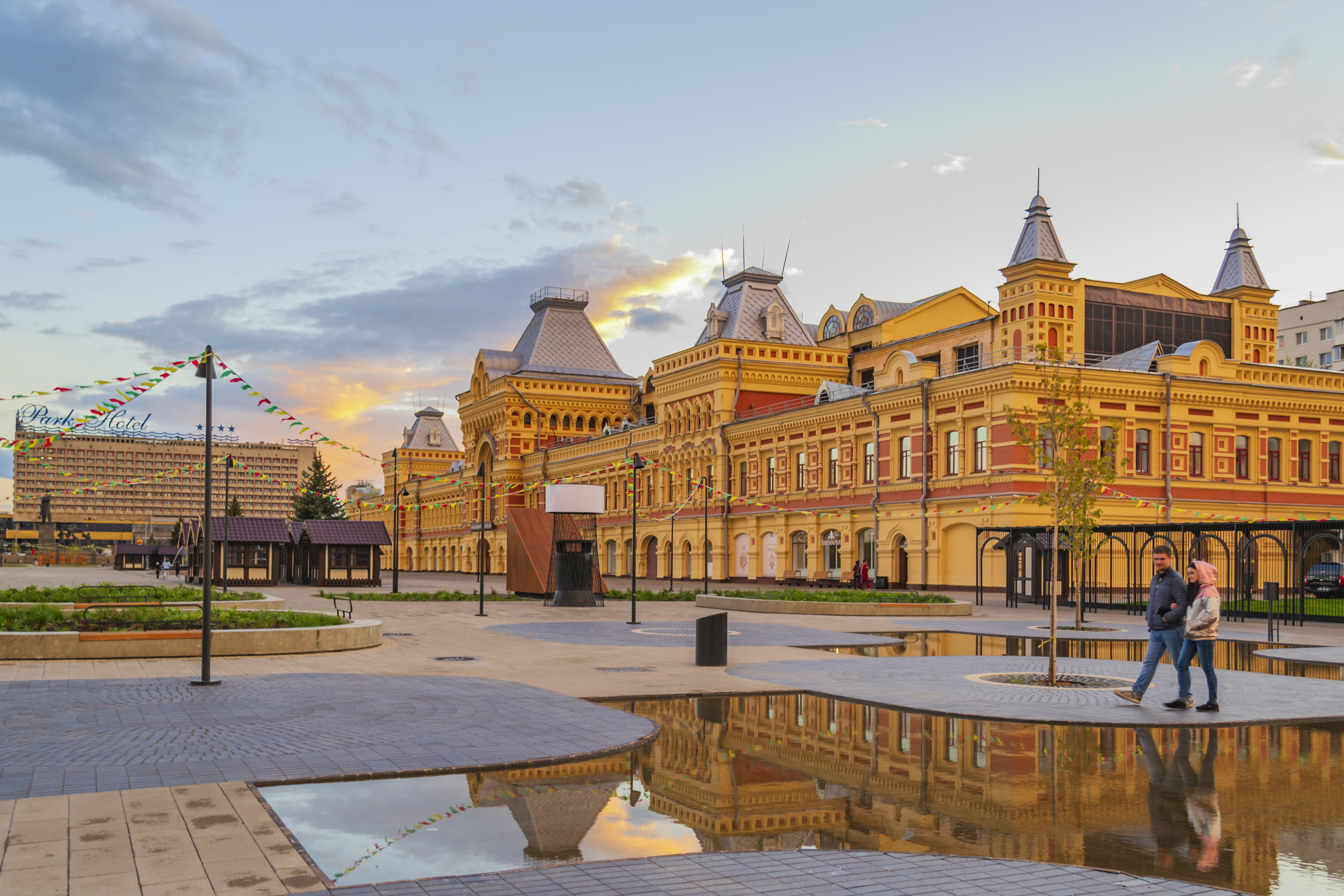
The Fair

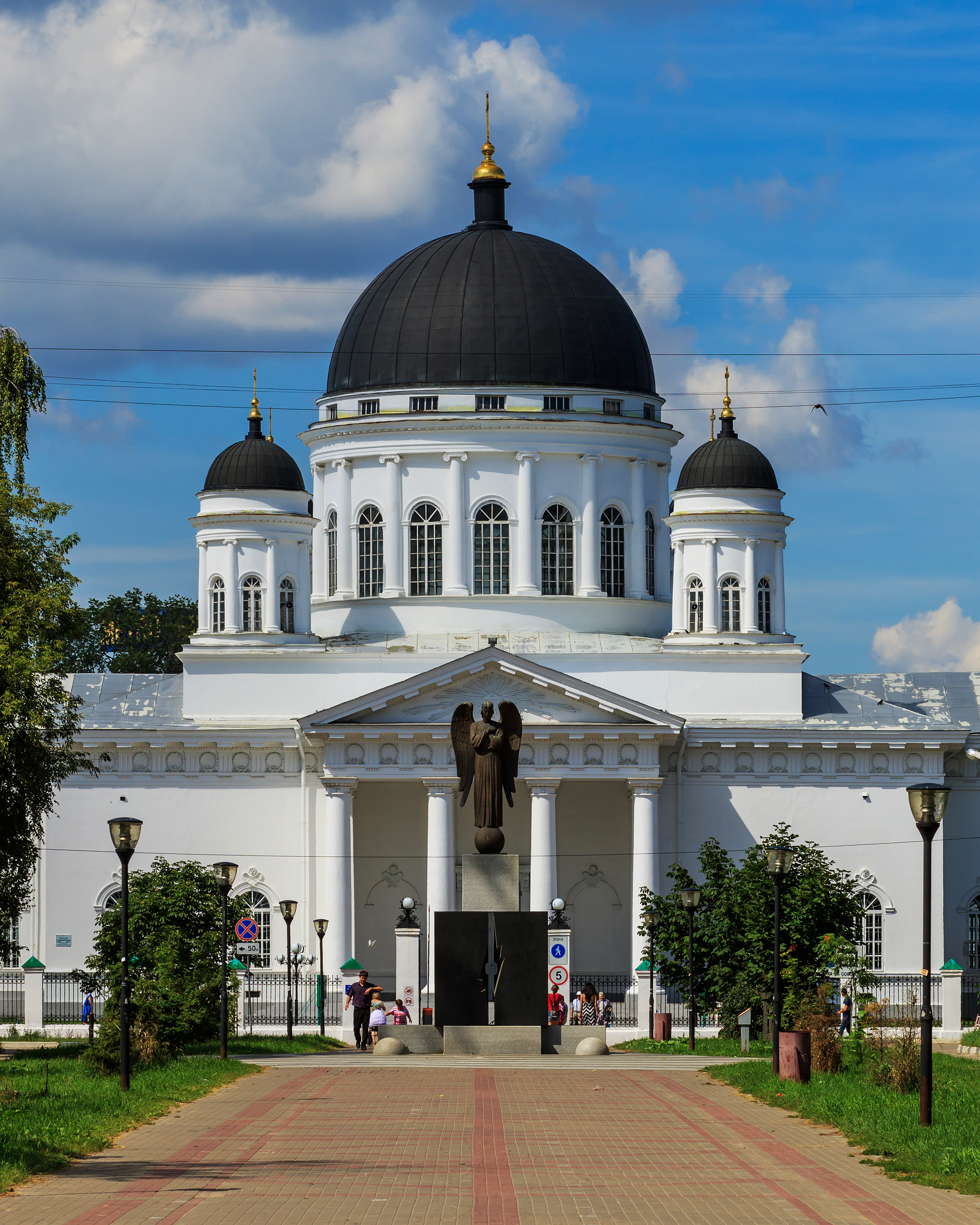
The Transfiguration Cathedral

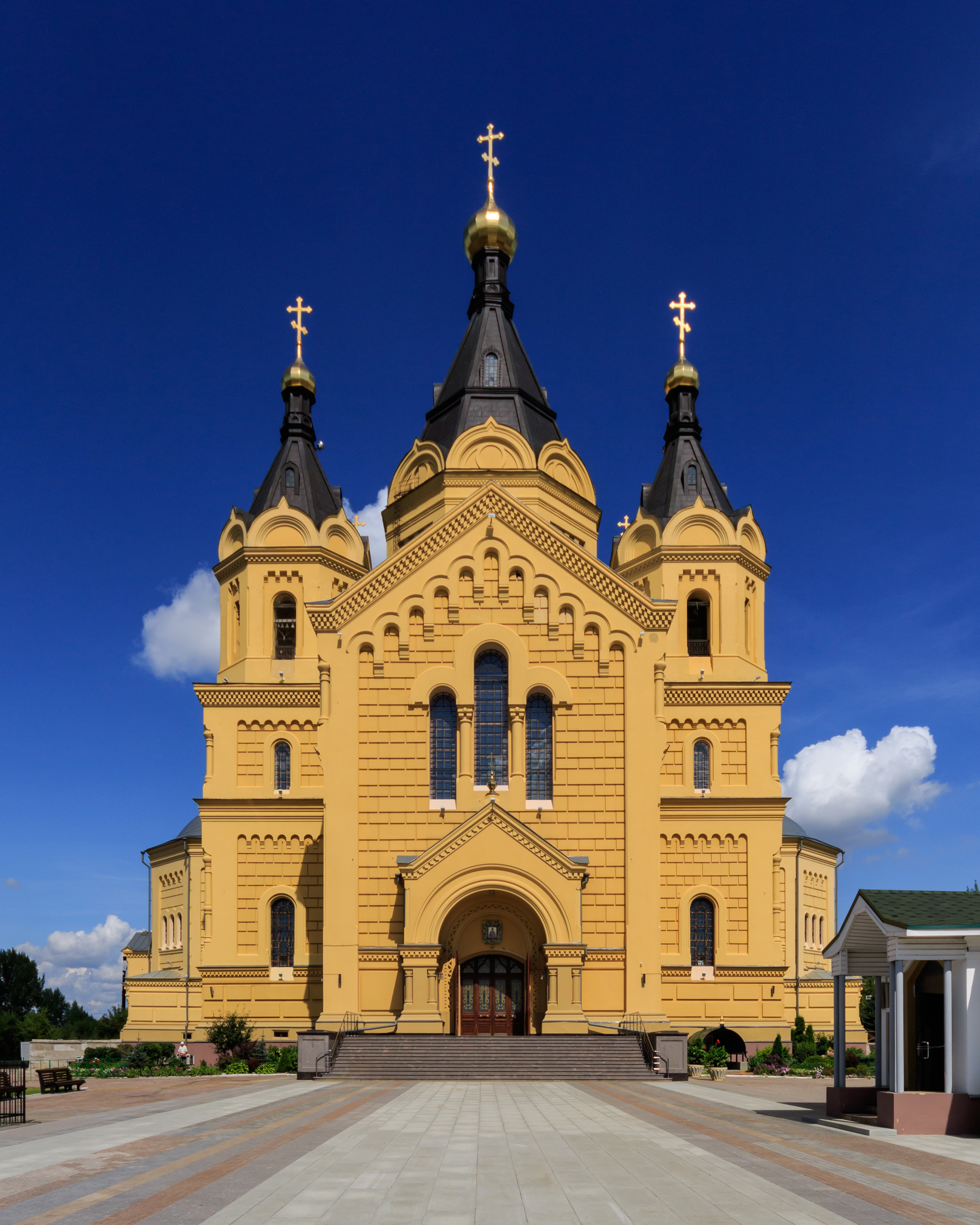
The Alexander Nevsky Cathedral

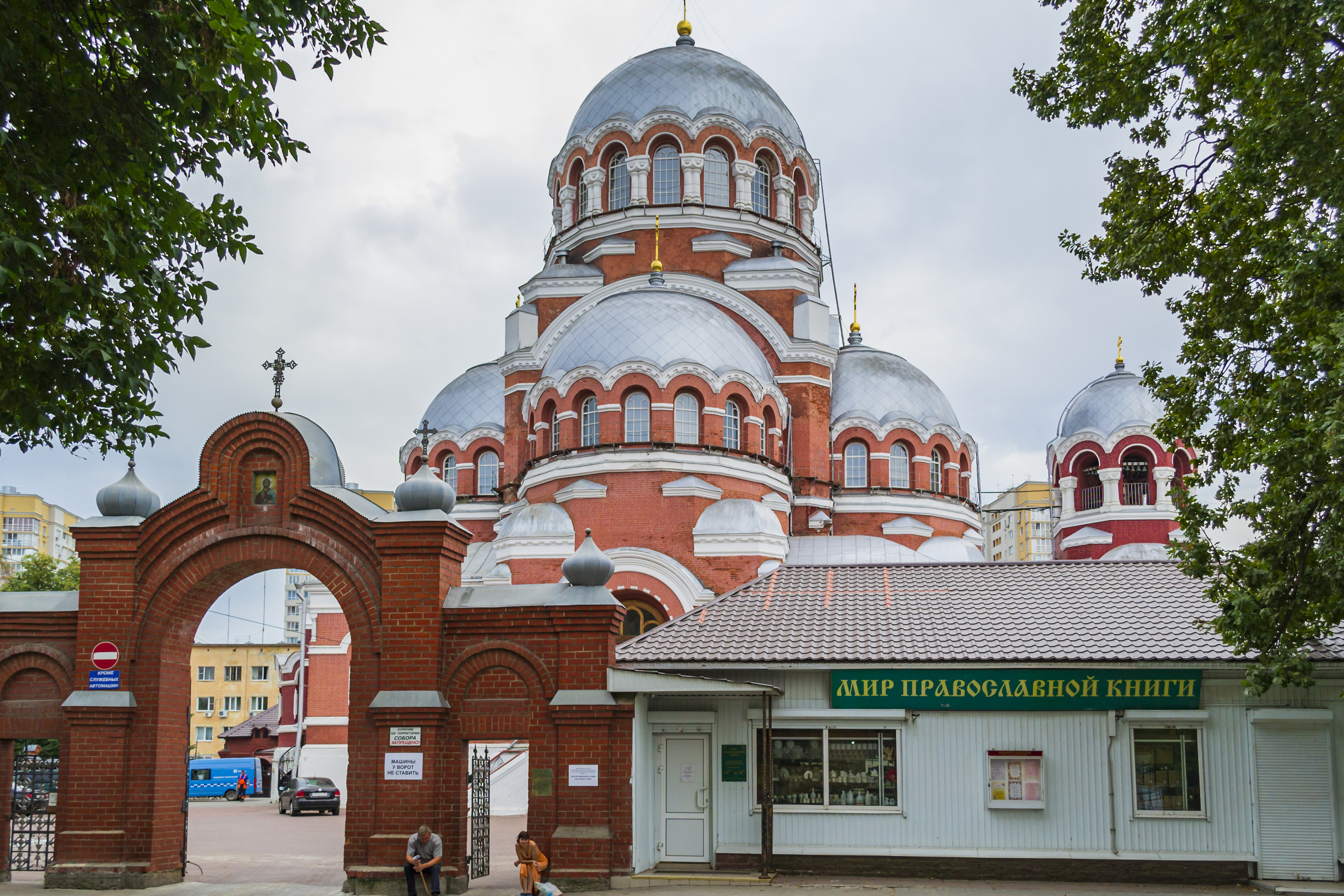
Sormovo Transfiguration Cathedral
