= Nizhny Novgorod Stadium =

Association football stadium in Nizhny Novgorod, Russia

Sovcombank Arena
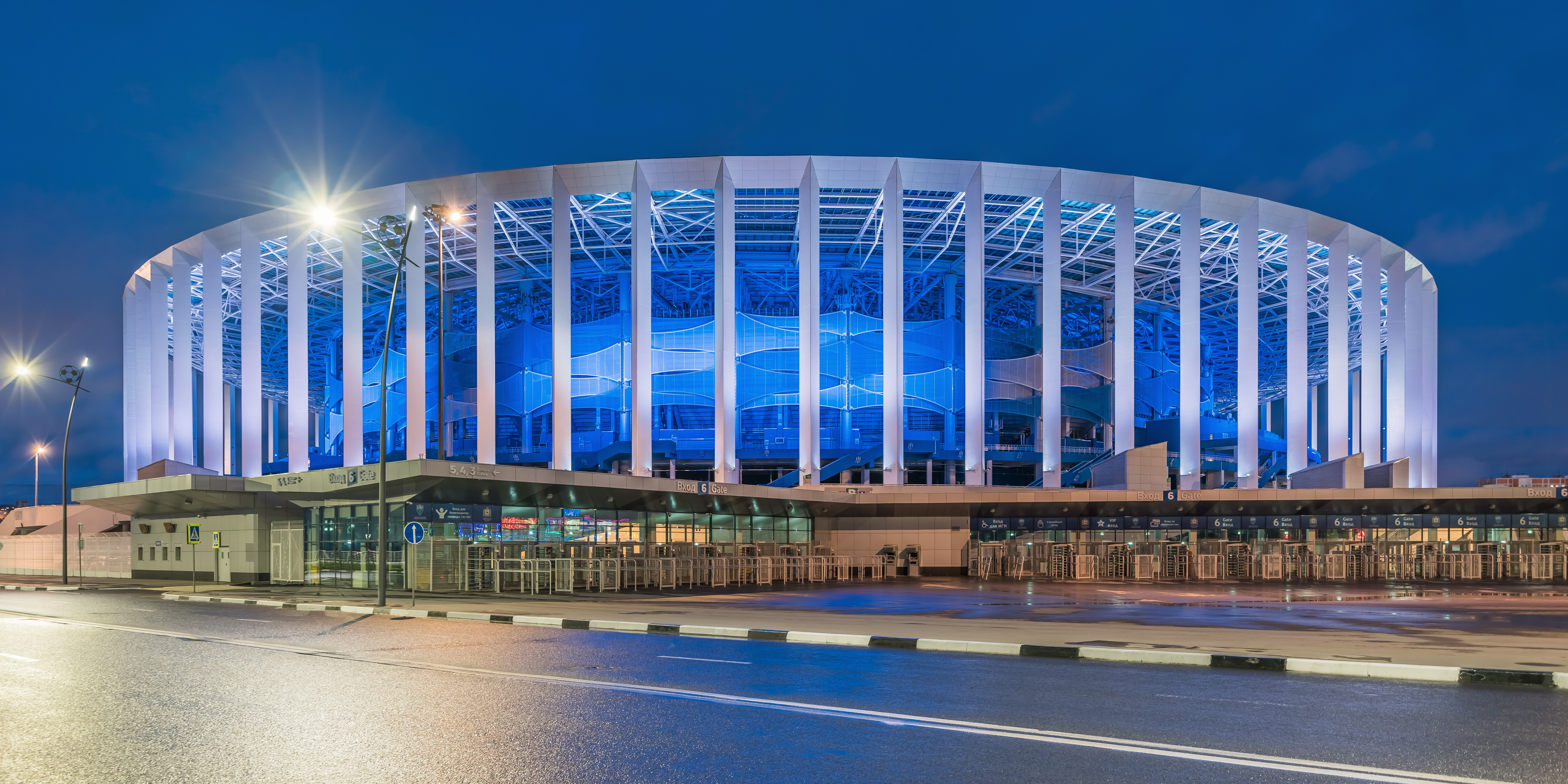
- Nizhny Novgorod Stadium at night UEFA
- Interactive map of Sovcombank Arena
- Full name: Sovcombank Arena
- Location: Betankura st., 1A, Nizhny Novgorod, Russia
- Coordinates: 56°20′15″N 43°57′48″E
- Capacity: 44,899 (Official); 43,319 (2018 FIFA World Cup)
- Surface: GrassMaster
- Field size: 105 x 68 m
- Public transit: Strelka

Construction
- Groundbreaking: 2015
- Built: 2016–2017
- Opened: 2018
- Cost: 17,9 billion ₽

Tenants
- FC Pari Nizhny Novgorod (2018–present); Russia national football team (selected matches)

Sovcombank Arena (Russian: Совкомбанк Арена) is a football stadium in Nizhny Novgorod, Russia. It was one of the venues for the 2018 FIFA World Cup. It has a capacity of 44,899 spectators.

== General facts ==
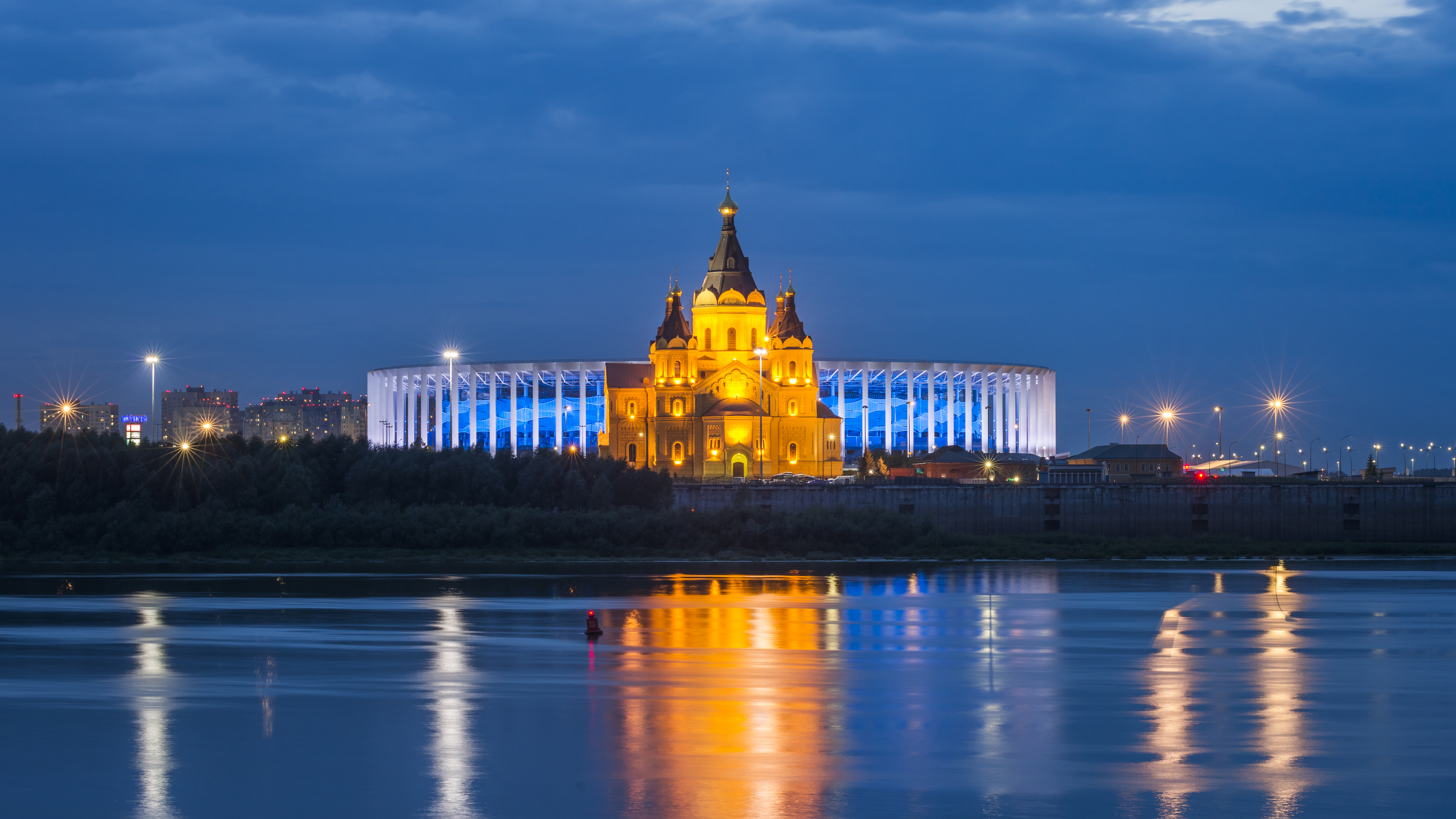
Nizhny Novgorod Stadium.

The new stadium for the 2018 FIFA World Cup in Nizhny Novgorod was built in the historic area known as the Spit (Strelka), at the confluence of the two major rivers: the Volga and the Oka. It overlooks the Nizhny Novgorod Kremlin standing on the opposite bank of the river. The stadium design follows the classic style and uses a palette of white, blue and azure that is associated with the nature of the Volga region and the elements of water and wind. Its metalwork roof weighing over 11,000 tons gives the stadium a massive appearance, while its façade and semi-translucent rooftop add lightness and airiness to the overall look.

The projected total area of the stadium building is 127,500 m^{2}.

The capacity of the stadium will be about 45,000 seats, including 902 seats for low-mobility groups of people together with accompanying persons. It is expected now that the tournament is over, the stadium will be used for home matches of the FC Nizhny Novgorod in the Russian Football National League.

In the spring of 2017, Governor Valery Shantsev suggested that the stadium will be used for competitions in other sports, as well as for other major events and concerts.

== Construction ==
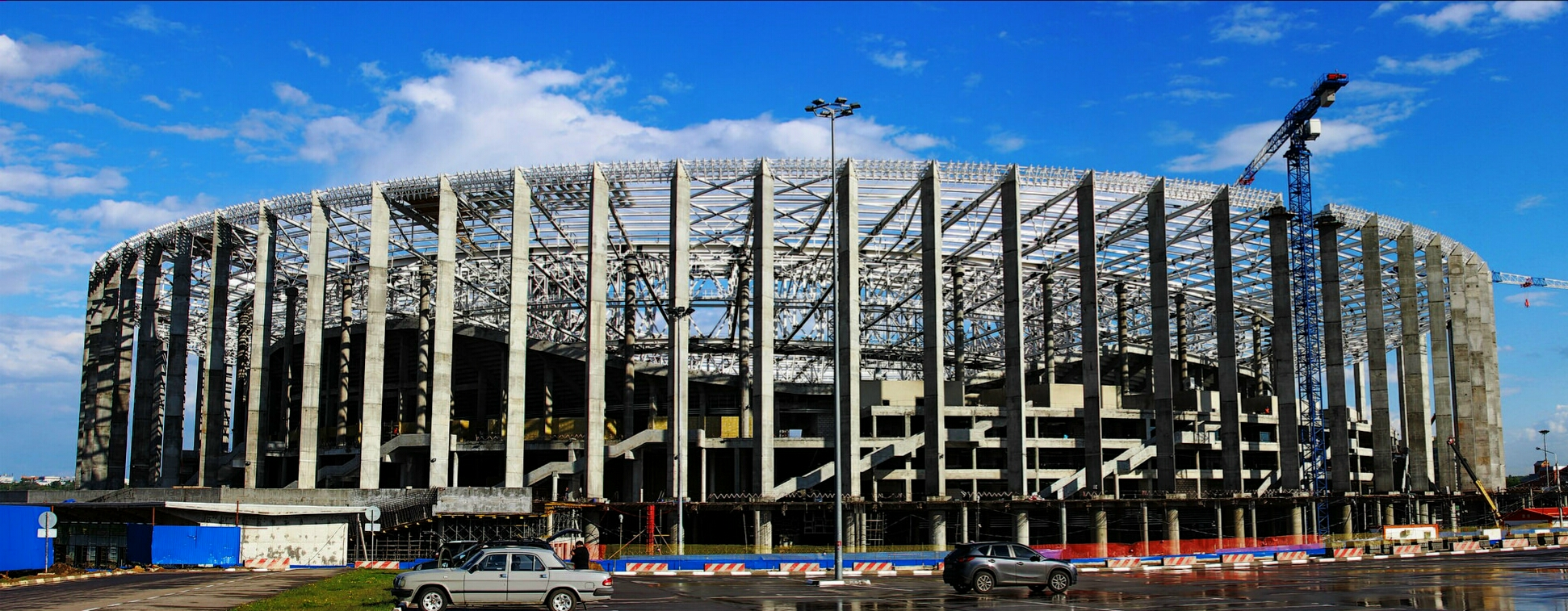
The stadium under construction

At the end of 2014, the Ministry of Sport of the Russian Federation signed a contract with OAO Stroytransgaz for the construction of a stadium worth 16.756 billion rubles for an area of 21.6 hectares. The total estimated cost of the stadium, which includes, in addition to the construction and installation works performed by the general contractor, also the design cost, is 17.9 billion rubles.

Works on the construction of the stadium was planned to start in 2012, but only began in 2015. The area of the stadium borders on the area of historical buildings, where the architectural monument Alexander Nevsky Cathedral is located, too.

In 2016, the basic concrete works were completed - all the floors of the stadium and the platform of the upper tier were erected. The builders began to install engineering systems. By the end of 2016, the contractor had installed metal structures above the tribune zone, including the support ring - just over 50% of the stadium's total coverage. In 2017 completion of installation in the final design position of steel structures of the coating, concreting the stands of the lower tier and pedestrian overpass. Also, the builders are to carry out the installation of the roof, the facade, the construction of the football field, and complete the finishing work.

Under the terms of the contract, construction and installation work is expected to be completed in December 2017.

In July 2017, the stadium began to sow the lawn. For seeding, several varieties of lawn grass "Rigras" have been selected. At the base of the lawn laid rubble and sand, which were successfully tested in Scotland. Two months later, when the root system of the lawn is formed, it is sewn with polymer threads.

== Transportation ==
A transport interchange has been prepared for the stadium. In February 2012, it was proposed to build in the area of arrows eponymous metro station due to the extension of the Sormovo Meshcherskaya-line one station from the Moskovsky railway station in the spring of 2018. The stadium project for the World Cup 2018 was adopted by the Town Planning Council of the Nizhny Novgorod region on 22 March 2013.

As of January 2017, Strelka metro station in Nizhny Novgorod Metro is 55% ready, from the report of the builders to the governor at his inspection of the station. It also became known that the tunneling to the new station was completed in May 2017.

== 2018 FIFA World Cup ==
| Date | Time | Team #1 | Result | Team #2 | Round | Attendance |
|---|---|---|---|---|---|---|
| 18 June 2018 | 15:00 | Sweden | 1–0 | South Korea | Group F | 42,300 |
| 21 June 2018 | 20:00 | Argentina | 0–3 | Croatia | Group D | 43,319 |
| 24 June 2018 | 15:00 | England | 6–1 | Panama | Group G | 43,319 |
| 27 June 2018 | 21:00 | Switzerland | 2–2 | Costa Rica | Group E | 43,319 |
| 1 July 2018 | 21:00 | Croatia | 1–1 (a.e.t.) (3–2 pen.) | Denmark | Round of 16 | 40,851 |
| 6 July 2018 | 17:00 | Uruguay | 0–2 | France | Quarter-finals | 43,319 |

=== Conditions for spectators with disabilities ===
The arena offers special seating options for fans with disabilities with extra space for wheelchairs and accompanying persons.

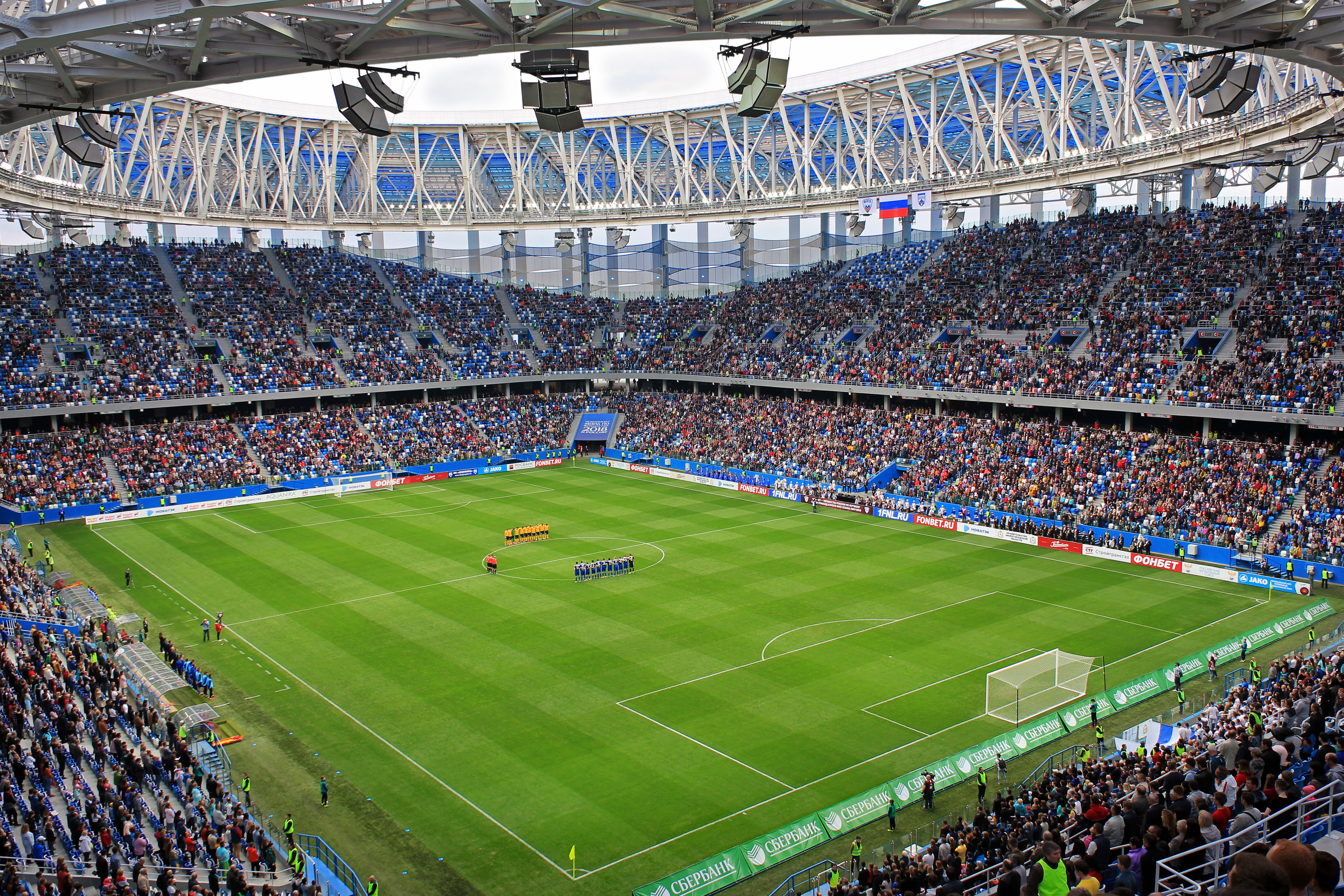
Interior of the stadium during a Russian Football National League match

== Concerts and other events ==
- June 20, 2019 – band Leningrad
- July 16, 2019 – singer Svetlana Loboda
- July 21, 2019 – show of Alexander Petrov #Rebirth.
- September 5, 2020 – planned: band Ruki Vverh!
