= Andrei Karelin =

Russian painter and photographer (1837–1906)

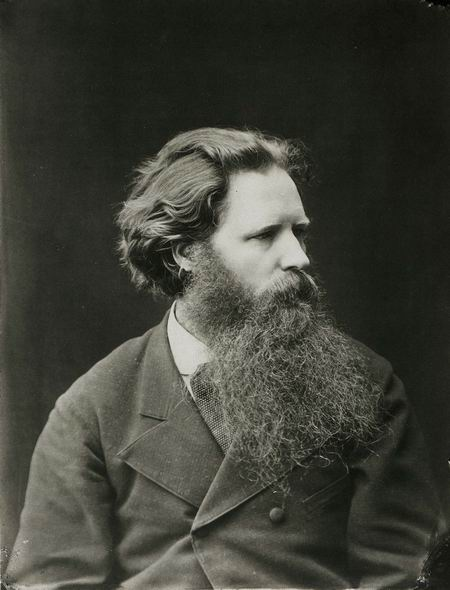
Andrei Karelin (date unknown)

Andrei Osipovich Karelin (Russian: Андрей Осипович Карелин; 16 July 1837 – 12 August 1906) was a Russian painter and photographer.

== Biography ==
He was the illegitimate son of Tatyana Karelina, a peasant woman. In 1847, he went to Tambov to study icon painting. Ten years later, he was able to enroll at the Imperial Academy of Arts in St. Petersburg. Soon after, he began taking his first photographs. In 1863, he was awarded two small silver medals, for drawings from nature. He completed his studies the following year, and was awarded the title of "Free Artist".

In 1865, with his wife, Evgenia, and their two children, he moved to Kostroma. There, he worked in the photography studios operated by Mikhail Nastryukov. The following year, Evgenia died while giving birth to their third child, Andrei, who would become a well known portrait painter.

He later remarried, to Olga Lermontova, a distant relative of the writer, Mikhail Lermontov. They moved to Nizhny Novgorod, where they had three more children. He also opened his own drawing school, and taught there until 1905.

He and the painter, Ivan Shishkin, created an album of color scenes of the city for the 1870 Nizhny Novgorod Fair. It became very popular, and is now a historical source. Three years later, he participated in a major exhibition in Vienna. In 1876, he was awarded a bronze medal at the Centennial Exposition in Philadelphia. In 1878, he became a member of the French National Academy of Arts, and received a gold medal at the Exposition Universelle

Another album of scenes of Nizhny Novgorod followed in 1886. He travelled to Yuryevets in 1887, to take photographs of a total solar eclipse. In 1898, he began making transparencies for magic lanterns; as a teaching aid for the public schools. Recalling his early days, he also painted the occasional church icon.

Due to the unstable political situation, his later years were marred by poverty. Eventually, debts forced him to sell his home and live in apartments. He also found it necessary to sell an extensive collection of antique art objects.

== Selected photographs ==
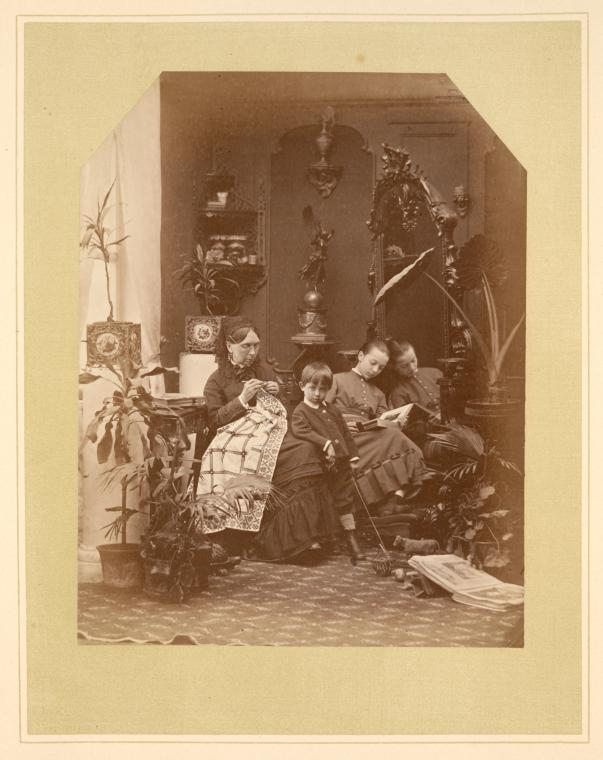
At Granny's House

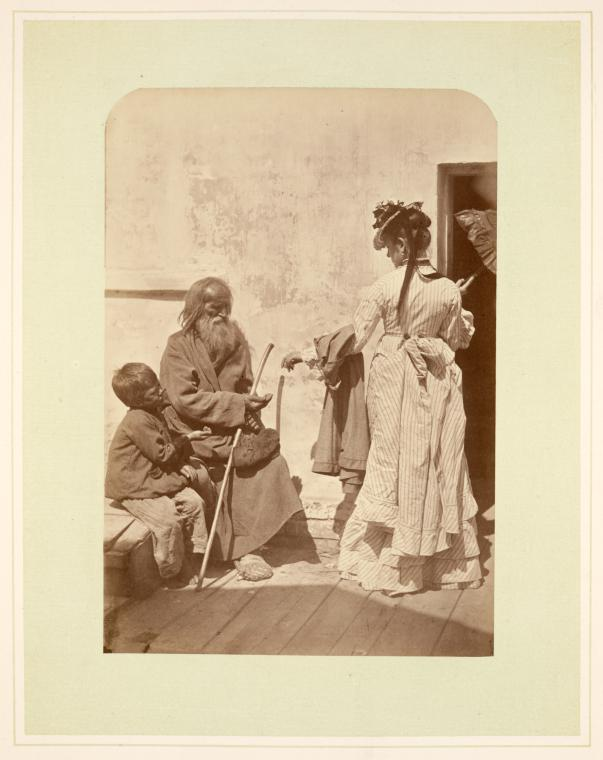
Charity

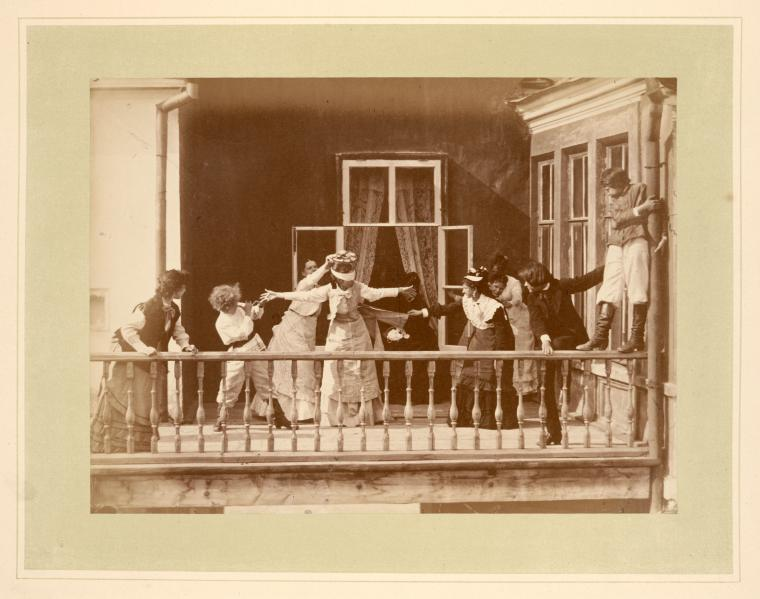
Playing Blind Man's Buff

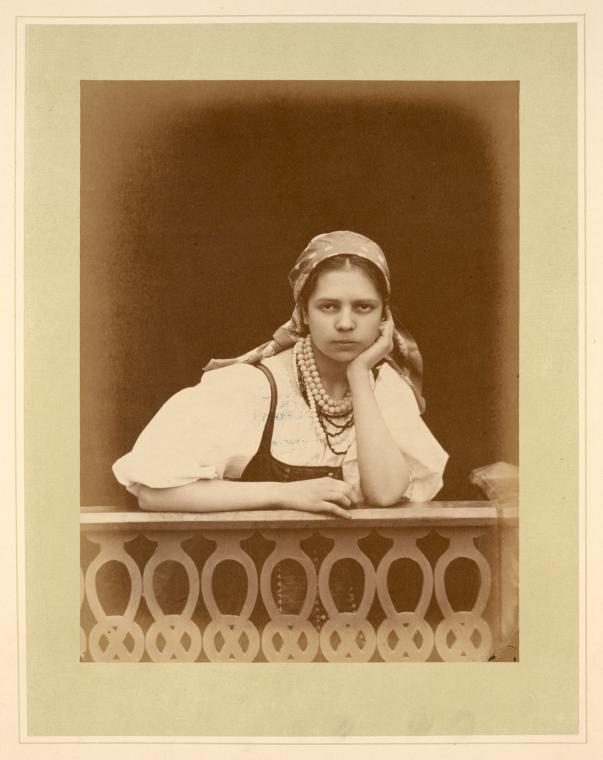
Portrait of a Girl

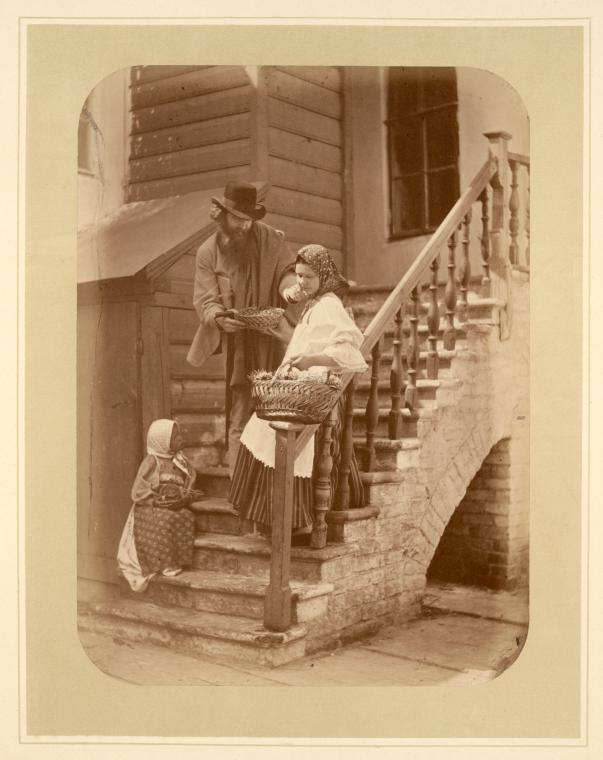
Buying Berries

== Sources ==
- Biography, works, timeline and references the Andrei Karelin website
- Likin, Художники-живописцы в Нижнем Новгороде (Artists and painters of Nizhny Novgorod), Нижегородский краеведческий сборник, 1929
