= Nizhny Novgorod Fair =

- Нижегородская ярмарка
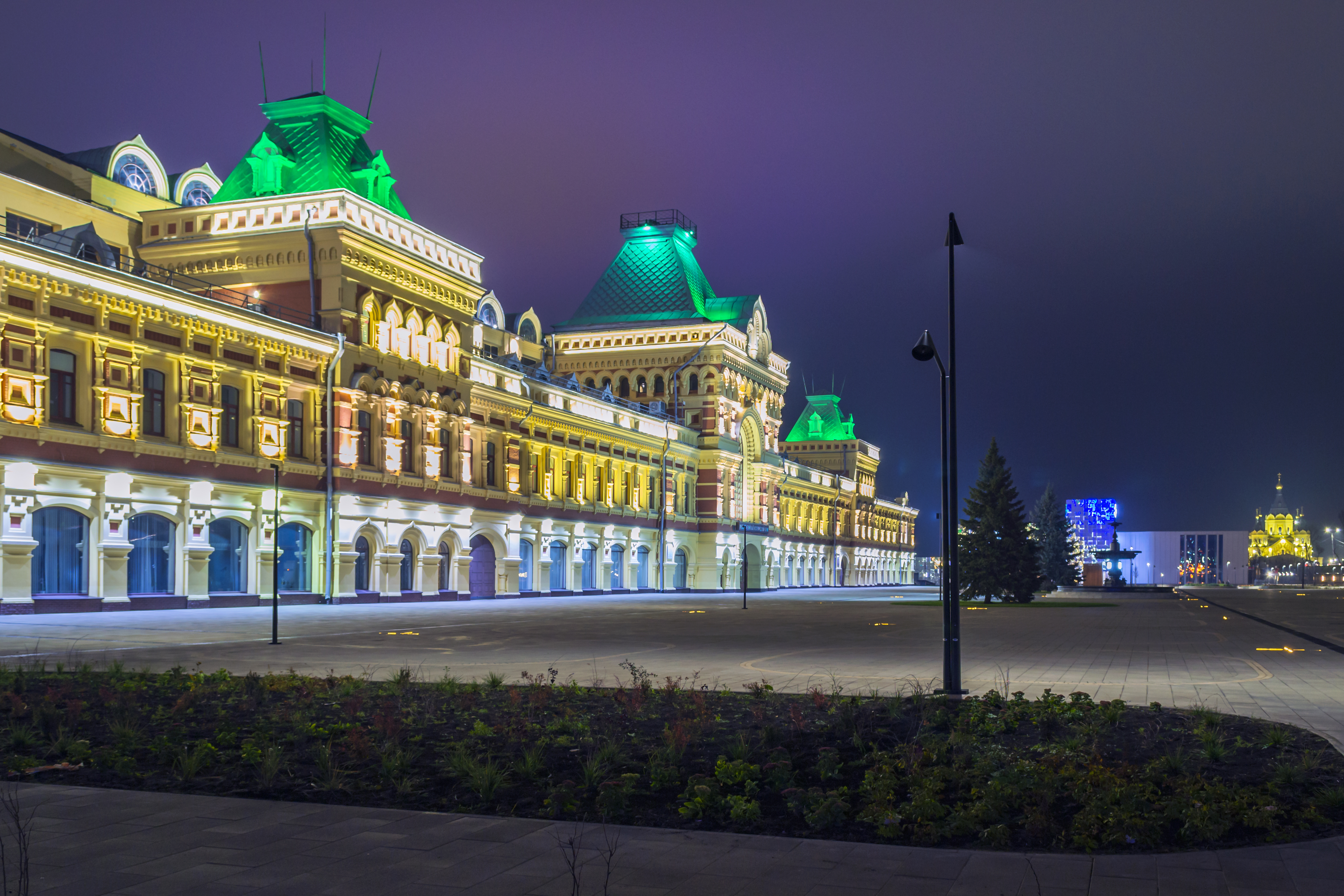
- The Main Fair building

- Location within Russia
- Former names: Makaryev Fair

General information
- Location: Nizhny Novgorod, Russia
- Coordinates: 56°19′42″N 43°57′39″E
- Construction started: 1817
- Opened: 1822
- Owner: City Duma of Nizhny Novgorod

Design and construction
- Architect: Auguste de Montferrand

Website
- yarmarka.ru

Nizhny Novgorod Fair (old name — Makaryev Fair) (Russian: Нижегородская ярмарка) was a fair in Nizhny Novgorod held annually every July near Makaryev Monastery on the left bank of the Volga River from the mid-16th century to 1816. Following a massive fire in 1816, it was moved to Nizhny Novgorod, but for some decades thereafter it still was commonly referred to as Makaryev Fair. It attracted foreign merchants from India, Iran, and Central Asia.

According to Durland, a journalist who visited the fair in 1905, the fair dates from "before the discovery of America." The fair was established by Muscovite princes to compete with, and draw commerce away from, a fair held since 1257, at Kazan, the Tartar capital. At the time Durland visited the fair, it consisted of 60 buildings, 2,500 bazaars and 8,000 exhibits, with goods for sale, along with a broad range of performances for the public.

This fair was a commerce centre to sell up to half the total production of export goods in Russia. The fair ceased in 1929. A society named Nizhegorodskaya yarmarka (Russian: Нижегородская ярмарка, Nizhny Novgorod fair) was created in 1991 with its headquarters in the former main fair building. However, today it is not actually a fair, but an exhibition center. Located in the historical centre of Old Kanavino.

== Buildings ==
=== The Main Fair building ===
The center of the fair was the main building in the spirit of classicism and the side administrative buildings that formed the central square. To protect from floods, a 3.5 m high dam was built.

By the end of the 1880s, the Main Fair Building was very outdated and it was decided to completely rebuild it. The following year the construction of a new building was completed. The building was built in the style of ancient Russian architecture of the 17th century. The building served as an administrative center.

On November 4, 2017, a new multimedia exhibition "Russia is My History" was opened in the Main Fair Building. The main focus of the exhibition is the history of Nizhny Novgorod, starting from Finnic peoples.

=== Transfiguration Cathedral ===
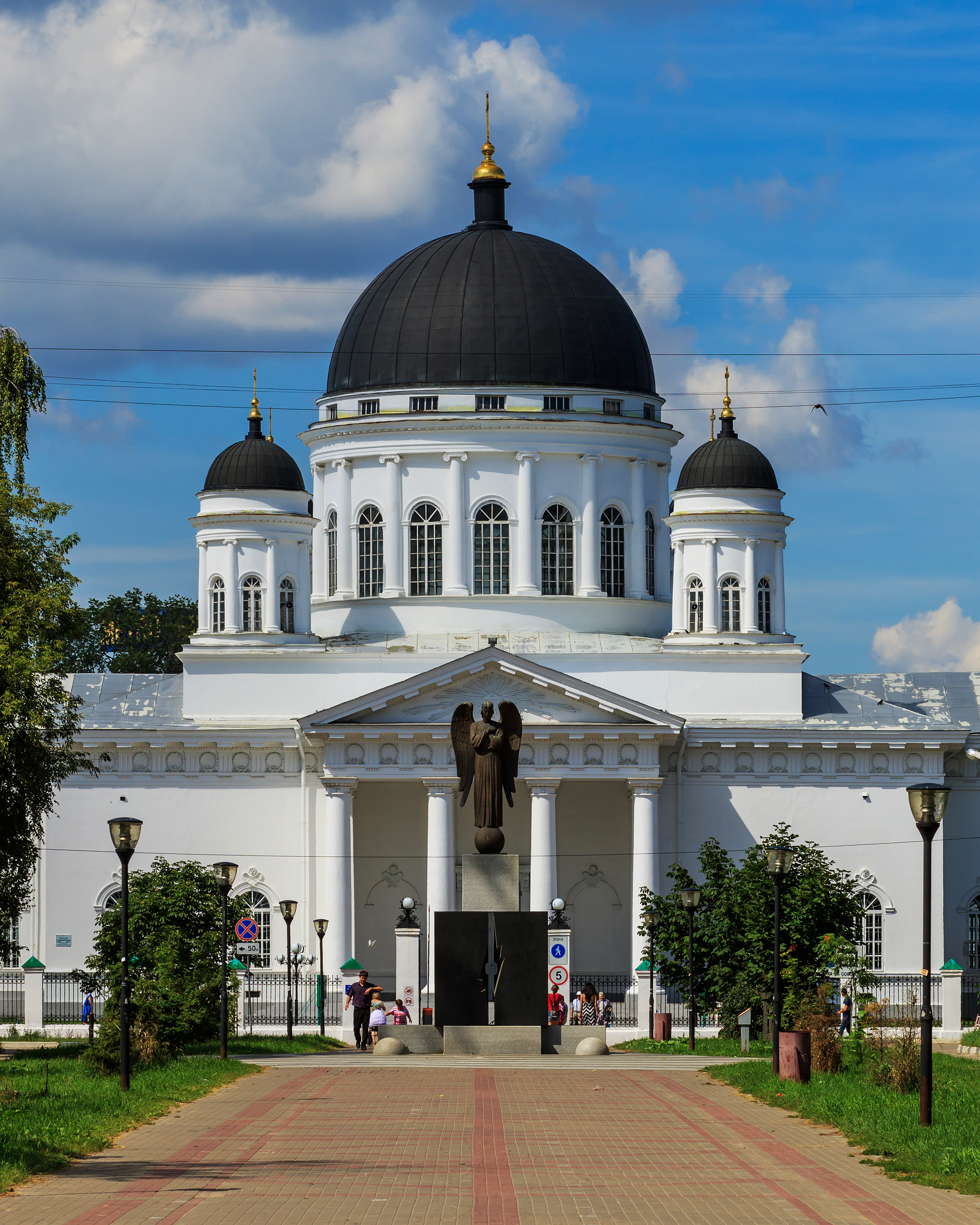
Transfiguration Cathedral

Also called Old-fair Cathedral. Temple in the style of late classicism. Until September 12, 2009, was the cathedral of the Nizhny Novgorod diocese. The construction of the cathedral was begun in 1816. It became known as an Old-fair cathedral after the construction of a new Alexander Nevsky Cathedral.

The building of the cathedral was built behind the main fairground on the main axis of the fair plan. It stood on the mound and, over time, groundwaters and floods blurred the soil. The building began to draft and cracks appeared in the walls.

After the October Revolution, the cathedral was closed. The warehouse was located in the temple, and in the administrative building - apartments. In April 1989, by the decision of the Council for Religious Affairs, the cathedral was transferred to the Gorky Diocese for restoration and use as a cathedral. Restoration work was started in the cathedral.

September 11, 2009 Patriarch of Moscow and all Rus' Cyril took part in the opening of the monument to Nizhegorodians - participants in the liquidation of the consequences of the Chernobyl disaster.

=== Alexander Nevsky Cathedral ===
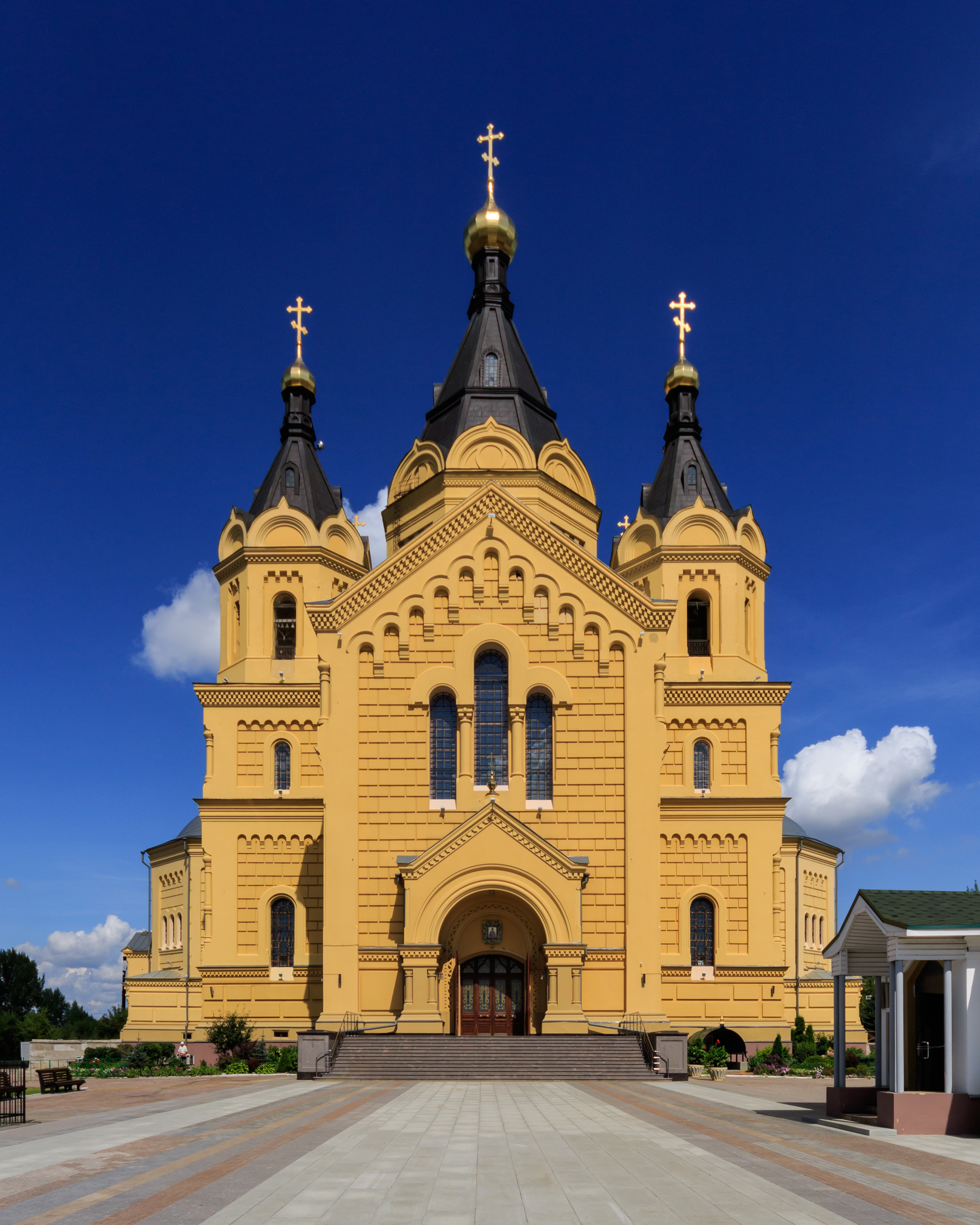
Alexander Nevsky Cathedral

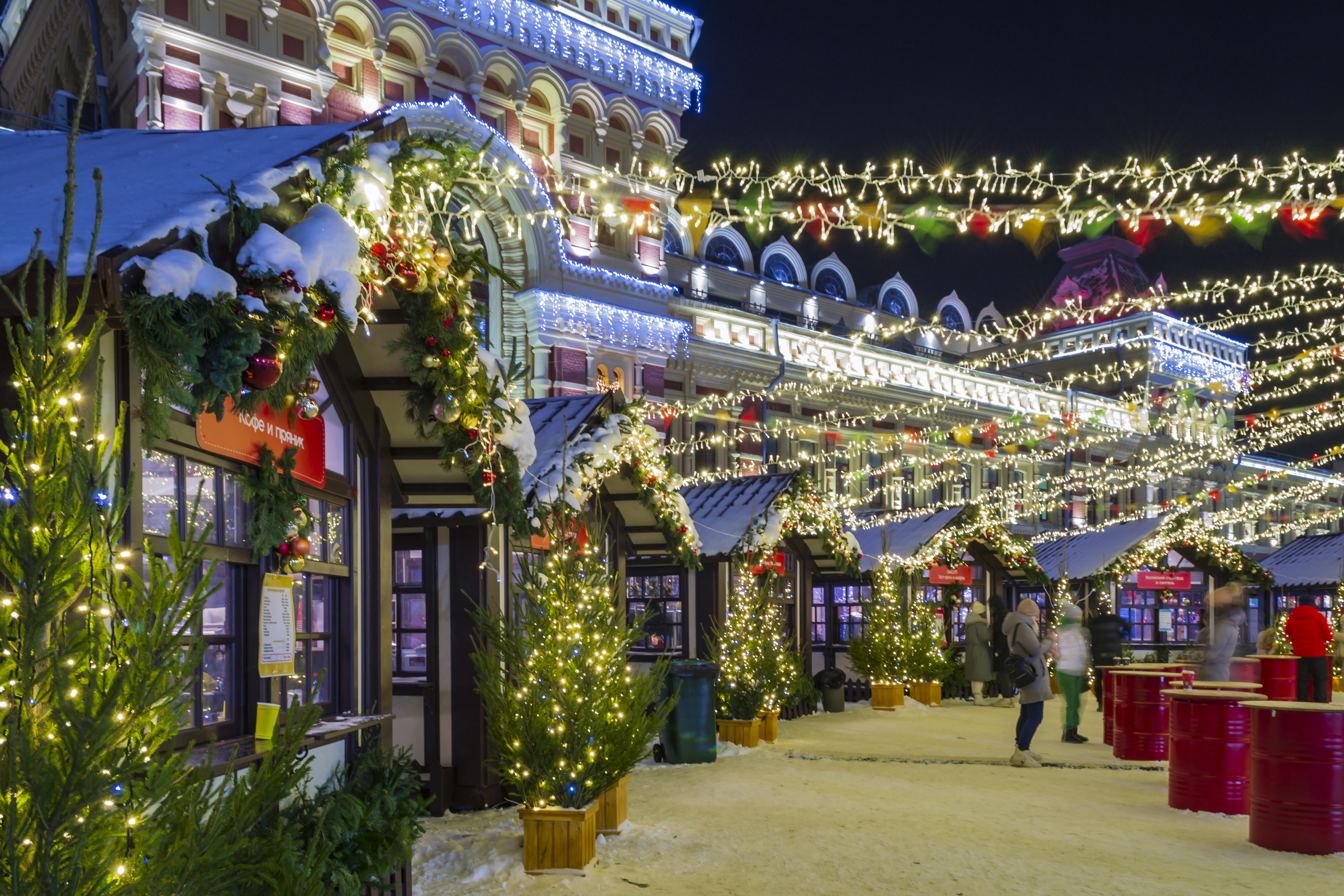
Christmas fair. December 25, 2021

Also called New-fair Cathedral. Orthodox cathedral. Built in the years 1868–1881.

In 1856 the merchants decided to build a new Orthodox cathedral in memory of the visit of the fair by Emperor Alexander II. They turned to the request for the construction of a new cathedral to Bishop Anthony and Governor A. Muraviov. A collection of donations was made. The required funds (454,667 rubles 28 kopecks) were recruited over 10 years (by 1866).

September 15, 1867 was established by the construction committee for the construction of the temple, and August 11, 1868, was laying the cathedral on the Strelka (Spit). The main construction of the cathedral was begun on August 18, 1868, and lasted for 13 years. In the cathedral were transported icons from the liquidated Makaryev monastery, which suffered from a fire.

In 1929, the temple was closed, valuables were seized. In the winter of 1930, according to the decision of the leadership of the Volga Flotilla, the iconostases and all the wooden ornaments of the cathedral were broken up for firewood to heat the city's houses.

In the late 1920s, a project for the reconstruction of the fairground was developed. It was planned to dismantle the cathedral and build a lighthouse with a monument to Lenin in this place. This project was not carried out, but in the late 1930s, the tents on the roof of the cathedral were dismantled.

During World War II, an anti-aircraft battery was installed on the site of the central tent of the cathedral, which defended the Gorky city (the name of Nizhny Novgorod in the Soviet era) from the Luftwaffe air raids.

In 1983, the restoration of the cathedral began. In 1989, the restoration of the broken tents of the temple began. And in June 1992 the cathedral was returned to the Russian Orthodox Church. On September 12, 2009, the cathedral was given the status of a cathedral (main).
