= Alexander Nevsky Cathedral, Nizhny Novgorod =

Alexander Nevsky Cathedral
- Cathedral of Saint Alexander Nevsky
- Собор св. Александра Невского
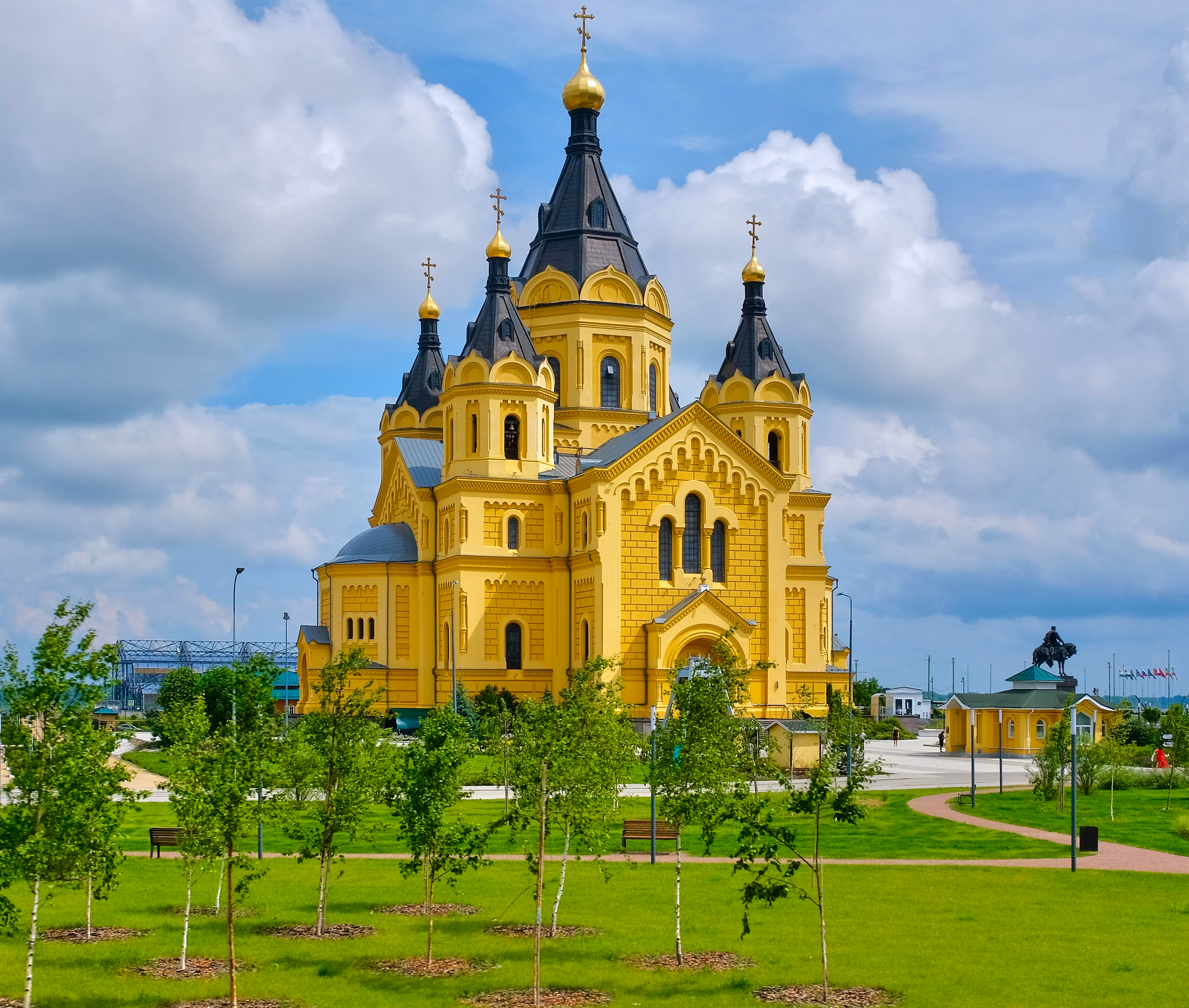

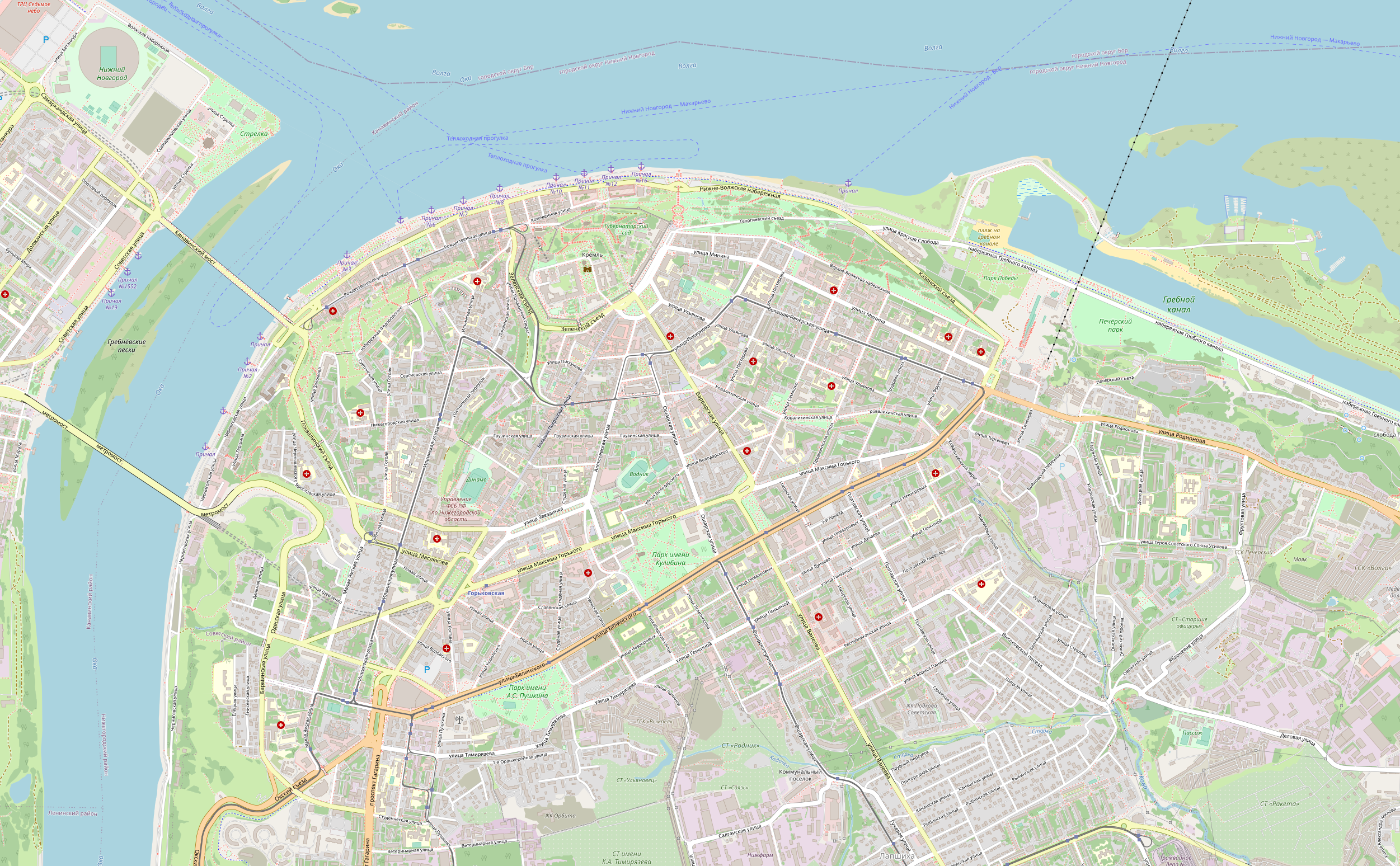
- 56°20′0.96″N 43°58′16.25″E
- Location: Nizhny Novgorod
- Country: Russia
- Denomination: Russian Orthodox Church
- Website: nevskiy-nne.ru

History
- Founded: 15 July 1868
- Founder: Alexander II of Russia
- Consecrated: 20 July 1881

Architecture
- Heritage designation: Architectural monument 521510211190006
- Architect: Lev Dal'
- Architectural type: Cathedral
- Style: Byzantine
- Groundbreaking: 20 July 1881

The Alexander Nevsky Cathedral (Russian: Собор Святого Александра Невского) is a Russian Orthodox cathedral church located in the Kanavinsky city district of Nizhny Novgorod. The cathedral is located on the former territory of the Nizhny Novgorod Fair. It is one of the unofficial symbols of Nizhny Novgorod, along with the Dmitrovskaya Tower of the Kremlin, the Chkalov staircase and the fair.

The main construction of the cathedral was begun on August 18, 1868 and lasted for 13 years, internal work continued until 1881. July 20, 1881 it was solemnly consecrated in the presence of Emperor Alexander III, his wife Maria Feodorovna and Tsarevich Nicholas. The height of the temple is 87 meters (3425.2 inches).

The closest metro station is Strelka.

== History ==
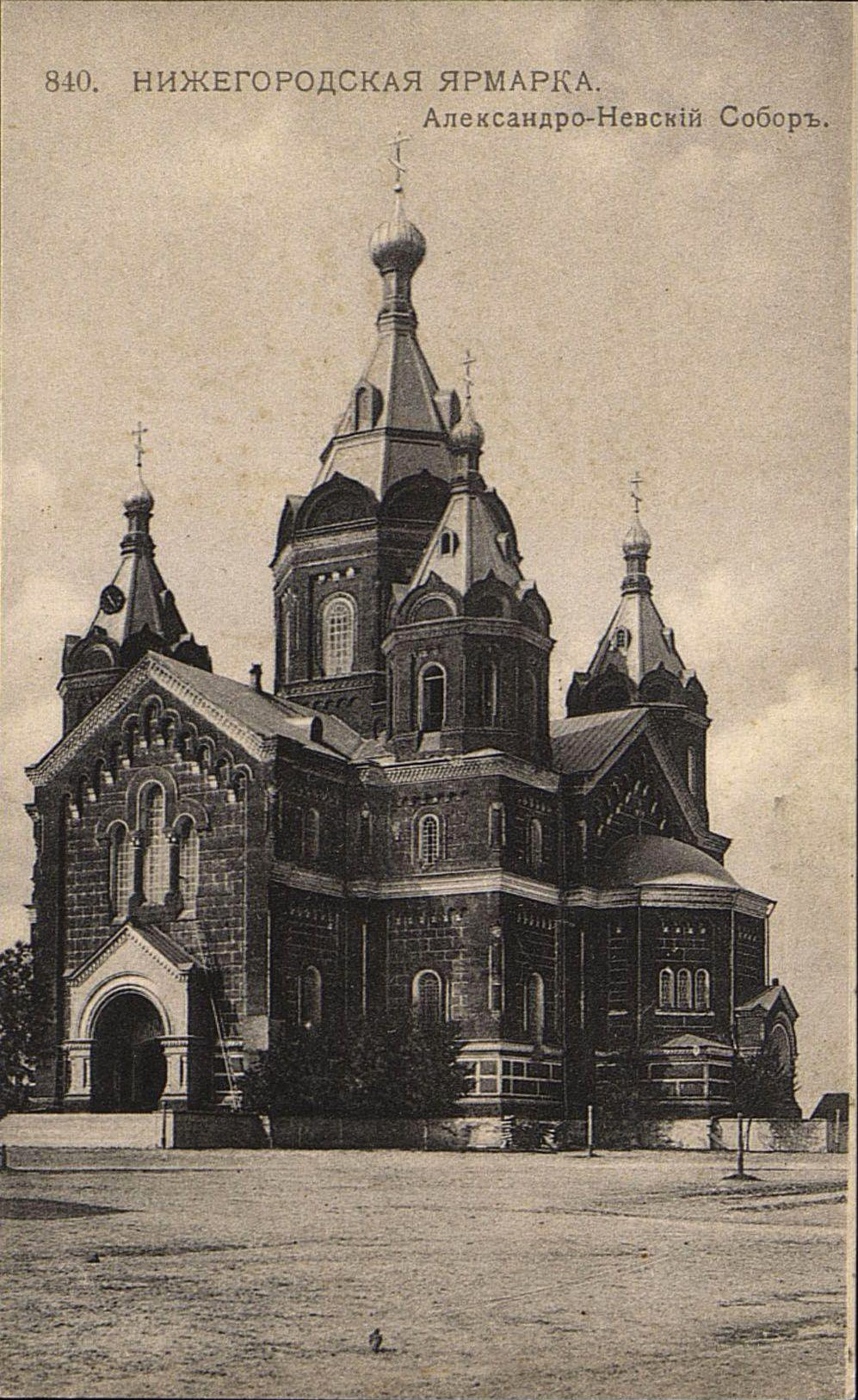
Alexander Nevsky Cathedral. Early 20th century

=== Russian Empire ===
In 1856 the merchants decided to build a new Orthodox cathedral in memory of the visit of the fair by Emperor Alexander II. They turned to the request for the construction of a new cathedral to Bishop Anthony and Governor A. Muraviov. A collection of donations was made. The required funds (454,667 rubles 28 kopecks) were recruited over 10 years (by 1866). November 18, 1865, the temple project was approved by the government. In 1866 Lev Dahl returned to Nizhny Novgorod from abroad and finalized the project.

The main construction of the cathedral was begun on August 18, 1868 and lasted for 13 years, the interior works continued until 1881. The cathedral was built without a pile foundation.

=== Soviet period ===
In 1929, the temple was closed, valuables were seized. In the winter of 1930, according to the decision of the leadership of the Volga Flotilla, the iconostases and all the wooden ornaments of the cathedral were broken up for firewood to heat the city's houses. However, parishioners managed to save several icons.

In the late 1920s, a project for the reconstruction of the fairground was developed. It was planned to dismantle the cathedral and build a lighthouse with a monument to Lenin in this place. This project was not carried out, but in the late 1930s, the tents on the roof of the cathedral were dismantled. Later, the building of the cathedral was converted for storage and housing. Numerous auxiliary rooms and various offices were added to the cathedral. In the 1940s there was a fire that destroyed the interior of the building. Afterwards, the remnants of the inner plaster were completely ripped off.

During World War II, an anti-aircraft battery was installed on the site of the central tent of the cathedral, which defended the Gorky city (the name of Nizhny Novgorod in the Soviet era) from the Luftwaffe air raids.

In 1983, restoration of the cathedral began. And in June 1992 the cathedral was returned to the Russian Orthodox Church. On September 12, 2009, the cathedral was given the status of a cathedral (main).

=== Bell "Cathedral" ===
The installation of the bell in honor of the 400th anniversary of the Nizhny Novgorod militia of Kuzma Minin and Prince Dmitry Pozharsky was planned at the confluence of the Oka and Volga rivers, 300 meters from the Alexander Nevsky Cathedral. Until this time, the bell is placed on the temporary belfry at the southern entrance to the cathedral. The project of creating the bell was implemented with the blessing of Patriarch of Moscow and All Russia Alexy II.

== Gallery ==
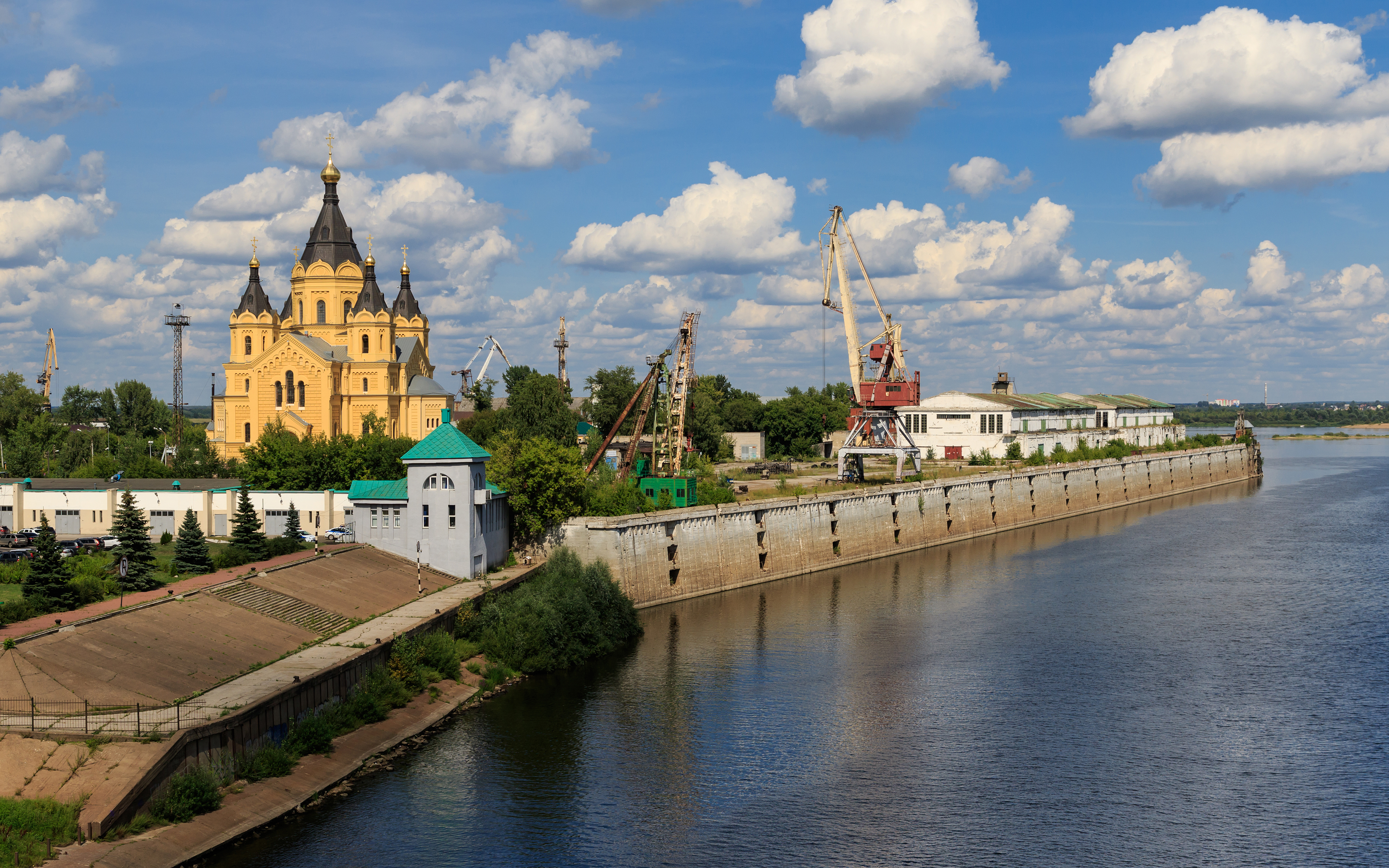

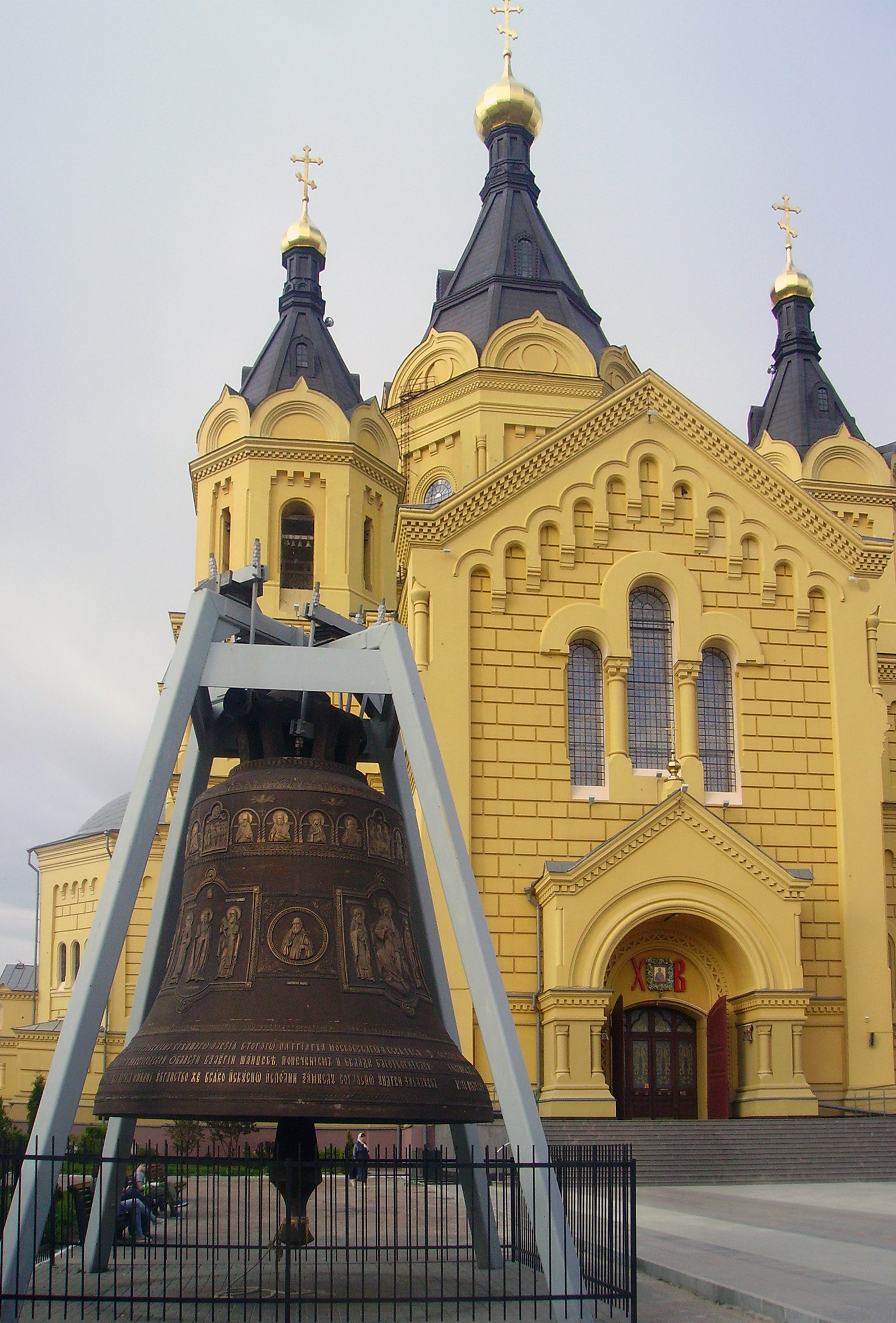

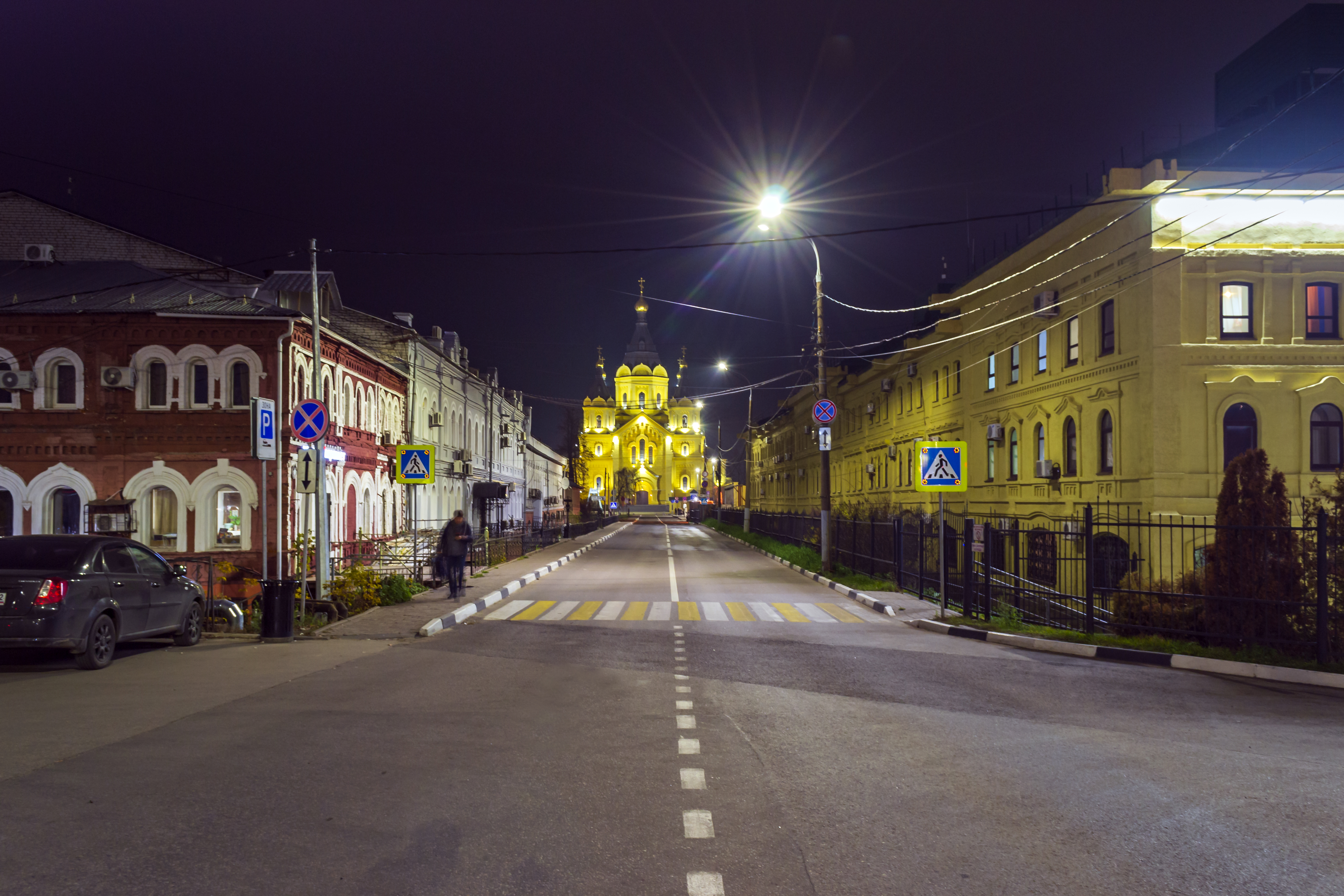
Strelka street

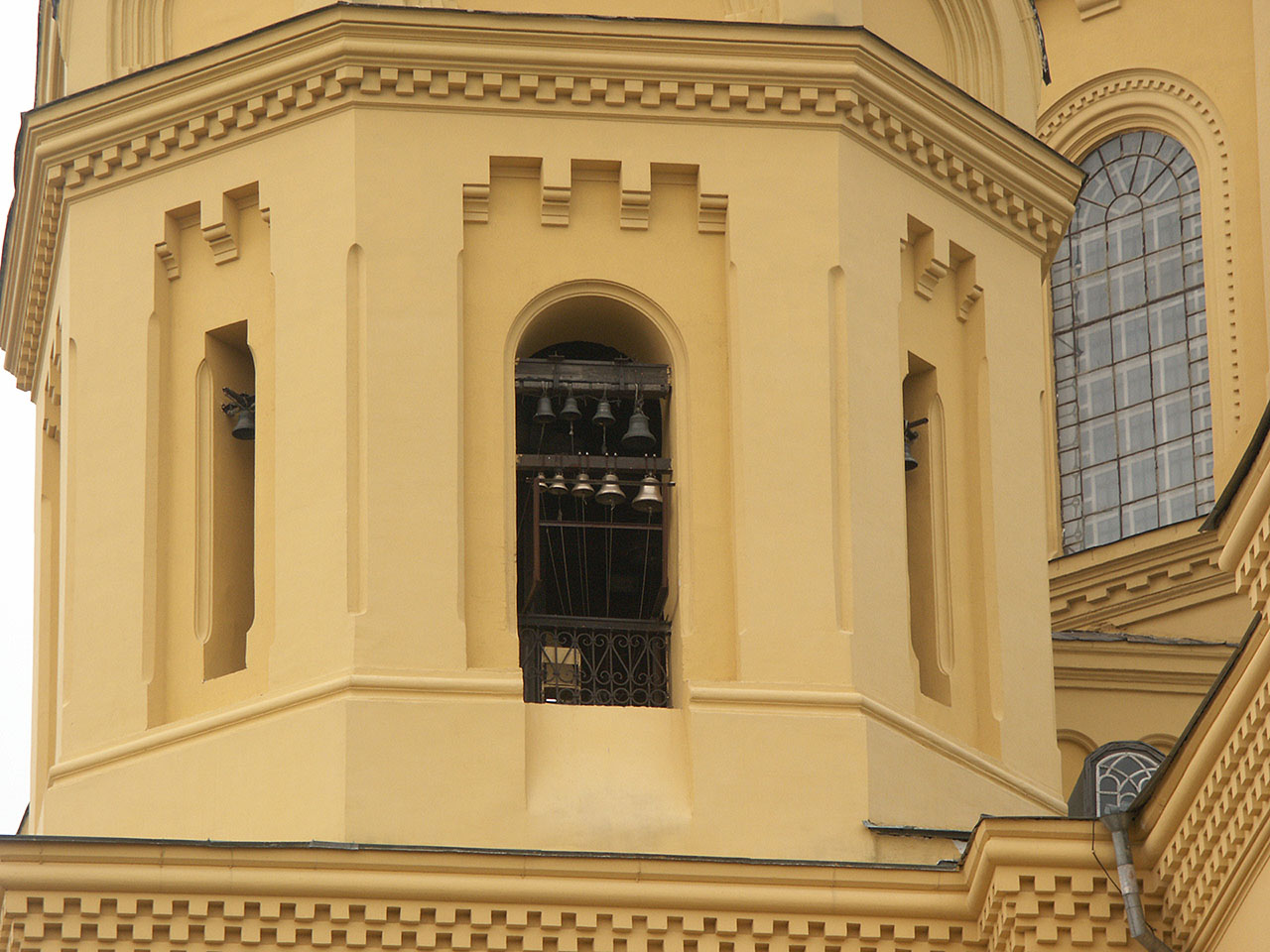

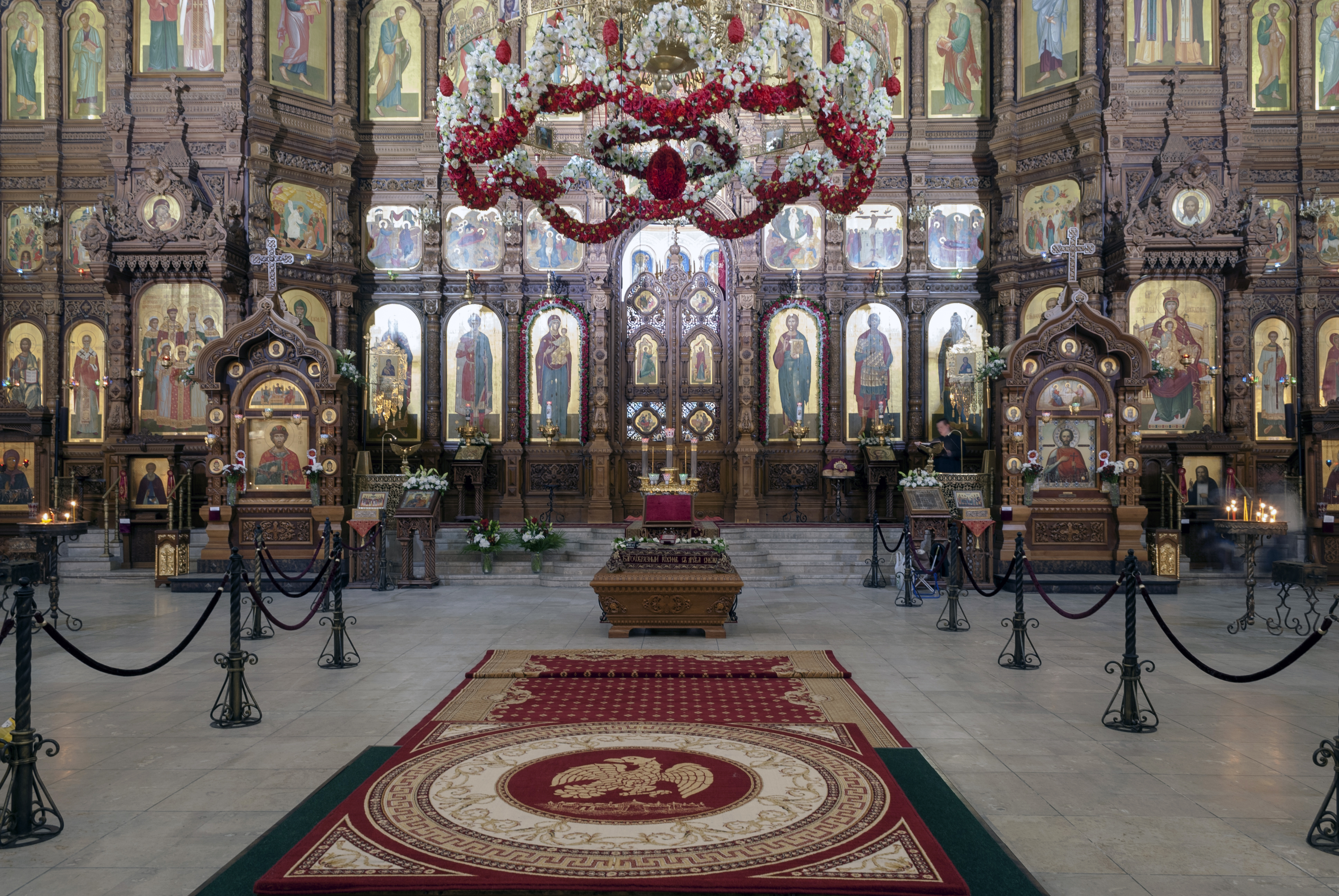
Cathedral iconostasis for Easter

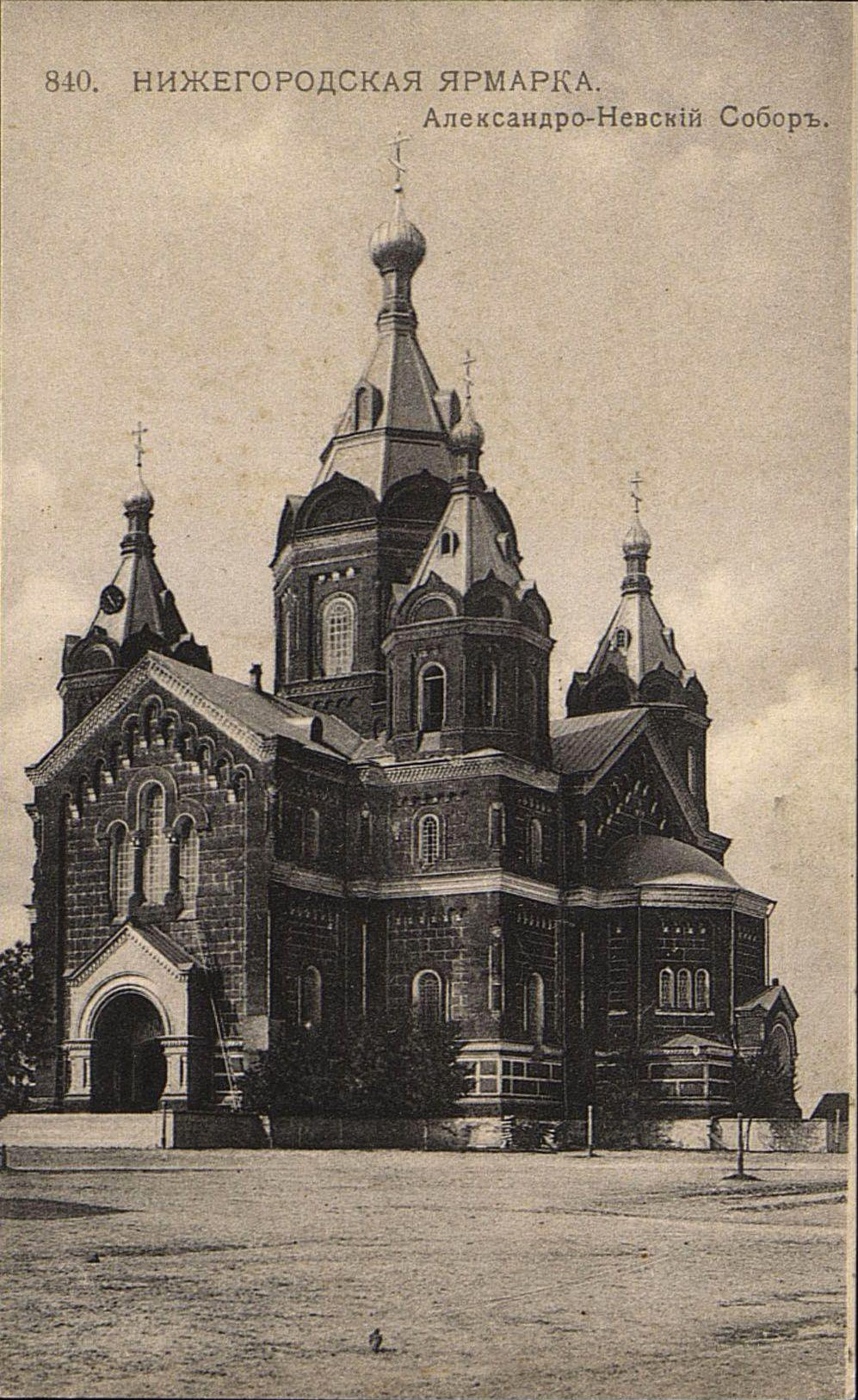

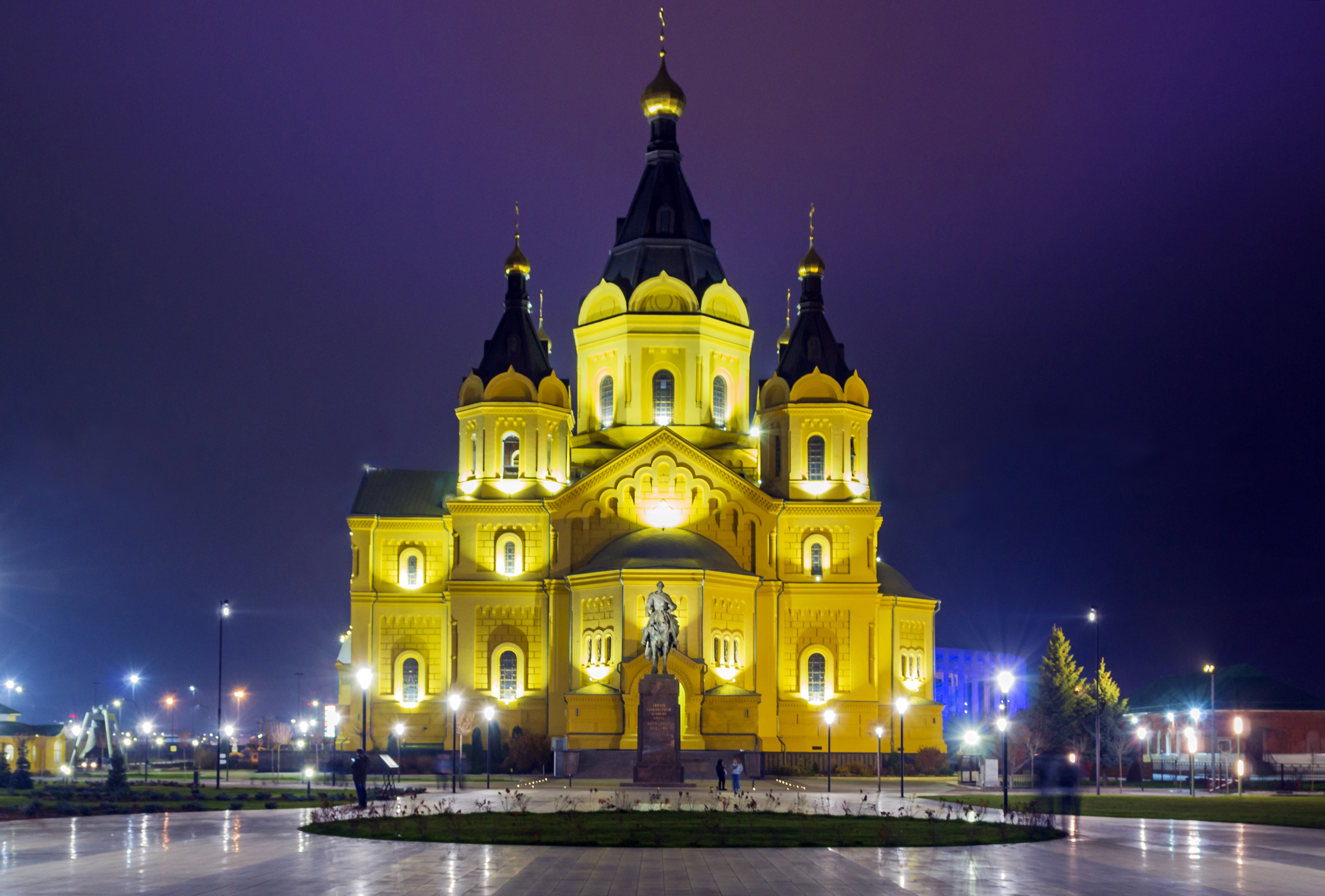
Cathedral at night
