= History of Nizhny Novgorod =

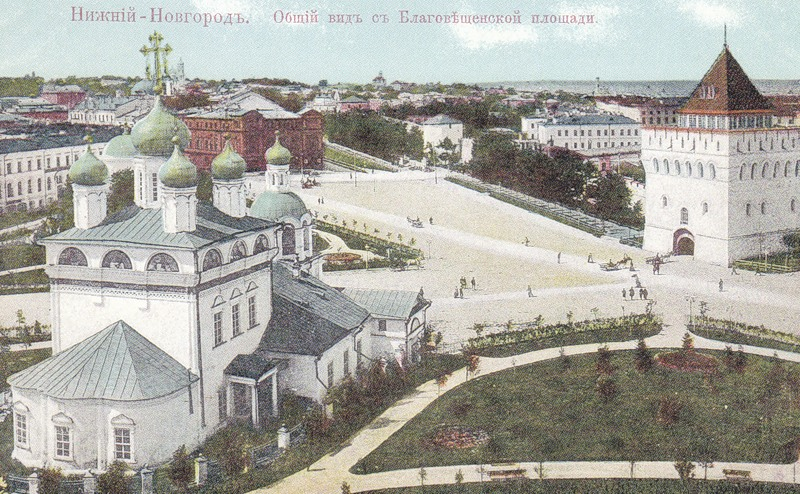
Annunciation Square and the Nizhny Novgorod Kremlin

Nizhny Novgorod was founded by Prince Yuri II of Vladimir in 4 February 1221. Citizens organized an army to liberate Moscow from the Poles in 1611, led by Kuzma Minin and Prince Dmitry Pozharsky. During the Russian Empire, in 1817 Nizhny Novgorod became the country's main trading city. In 1896, the city hosted the largest All-Russia exhibition. In the Soviet era, Nizhny Novgorod was renamed Gorky, in honor of the writer Maxim Gorky. Then it was the industrial center of the Soviet Union. During the World War II, the city sent to the front a huge amount of military equipment and ammunition. Therefore, the German air force bombed the city for 3 years. After the dissolution of the Soviet Union, the city was renamed back to Nizhny Novgorod. In Russia, the city became a political center and the capital of the Volga Federal District. Now the city is the center of information technology and develops tourism.

== Foundation ==
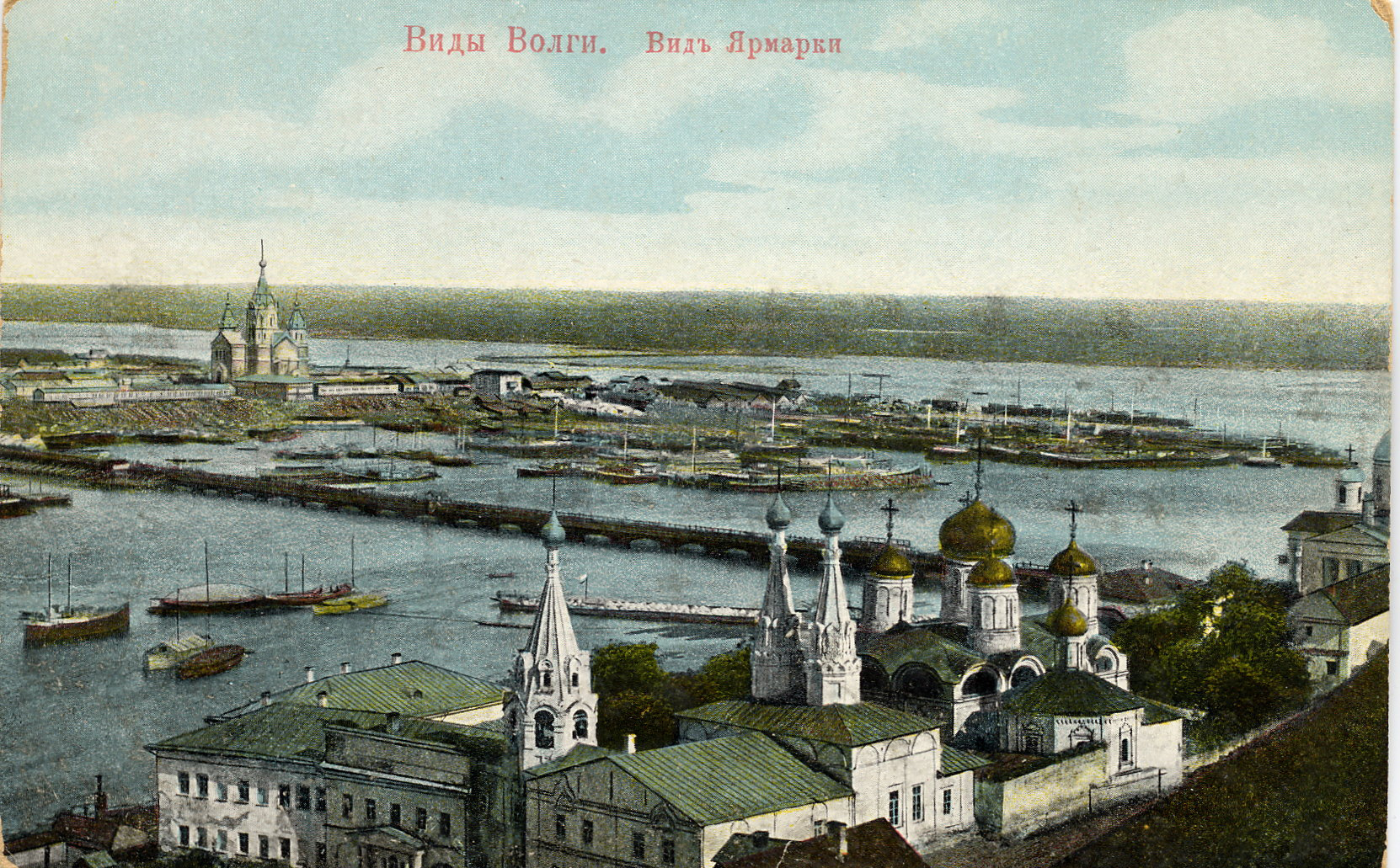
The Spit and the Annunciation Monastery in 1894.

In the Oka estuary formed a comfortable place to gather Murom and Suzdal armies for war against Volga Bulgaria. In 1220 Prince Yuri II of Vladimir conquered Bulgaria. The following year he decided to establish an important place for Vladimir-Suzdal and founded a city in the mouth of the Oka.

The name of the city - Nizhny Novgorod, that is, the "Lower Newtown" - led historians to think about the existence of an older city. The hypothesis of the "Oldtown" was supported by historians. There were versions of the origin of the city from the Bulgars, Mordovian-Erzyas (Erzya language: "Obran osh") or Russians ("Suzdal old city"). Archaeological data does not support any of the hypotheses, since there are no earlier buildings on the territory of the Nizhny Novgorod Kremlin or in the vicinity of the city.

The adjective "lower" (Nizhny) appeared in the city's name in later chronicles. There are several assumptions about its appearance:

- to distinguish it from Veliky Novgorod, as the city was in the "lower lands";
- The city was below Gorodets along the Volga.

The foundation of Nizhny Novgorod (1221) and Ustiug (1212) was the beginning of an active Suzdalian expansion into the Mordva and Volga Bulgar lands. In 1226, Sviatoslav and Ivan (brothers of Prince Yuri II of Vladimir) successfully conquered several Erzyan villages.

The first wooden fortress occupied an advantageous military-strategic position. It was on Sentry Hill and was well protected. On the one side there was a deep ravine, on the other side there were steep cliffs of the Volga shore. In the first years, two white stone churches were built in the fortress. In 1227 the Cathedral of St. Michael the Archangel was built.

== Feudal period ==
=== Under Suzdal and Gorodets ===
In February 1238, Gorodets and his surroundings were attacked by one of the independently operating detachments scattered throughout the territory of the Vladimir principality after the capture of the capital. After the 1238 Battle of the Sit River, Sviatoslav Vsevolodovich was prince of Suzdal, under whose jurisdiction Nizhny Novgorod and Gorodets also fell.

For a short period of time, a "veche republic" was established in Nizhny Novgorod in the style of Veliky Novgorod.

In the last third of the 13th century, the Gorodets Principality emerged from the Suzdal Principality. In his subordination was Nizhny Novgorod. Andrey Alexandrovich was the prince of Kostroma and Gorodets. He was the third son of Alexander Nevsky. The Principality did not last long. At the beginning of the 14th century, its cities were subordinated to the Vladimir Grand Prince.

In 1311, there was a war for the throne between the Vladimir and Moscow princes. Yury of Moscow conquered Nizhny Novgorod from Mikhail of Vladimir. His brother Boris became the regent. In 1320, after the death of Boris Danilovich, Nizhny Novgorod once again became subordinate to the Vladimir principality for a short period of time. Then Prince of Tver Alexander Mikhailovich supported the uprising against the Horde in Tver. In response, Khan Uzbek called on the Moscow prince Ivan Kalita to ruin the Tver Duchy. After the conquest of the Tver Principality, Khan Uzbek divided the princely possessions. Most of it he gave the Prince of Moscow. Part of the lands, including the former Gorodets Duchy, went to Alexander Vasilyevich. After his death in 1331, the princedom was given to the Moscow prince Ivan Kalita, who ruled it with the help of governors.

=== Principality of Nizhny Novgorod-Suzdal ===

In 1341, after the death of Ivan Kalita, Khan Uzbek divided the main territories of northeastern Rus'. Part of the land, which included Nizhny Novgorod, Gorodets and Unzha, became the property of Prince Konstantin of Suzdal. An independent Nizhny Novgorod-Suzdal Principality was formed, which occupied a vast territory. In the east, its border ran along the Sura River, in the southeast and south - along the rivers Pyana and Seryozha. The main stronghold in the east was the fortress of Kurmysh, founded in 1372. Along the border stood small fortresses, in which border guards lived. The remains of such fortresses are found along the Piana River in Buturlinsky and Sergachsky districts.

The bubonic plague hit Nizhny Novgorod again in 1365.

In 1377, the Horde attacked Nizhny Novgorod. In the battle on Pyana River, the Russian army suffered a severe defeat from the Horde prince Arapsha. Dmitry of Suzdal, who remained without troops, fled to Suzdal. The Nizhny Novgorod army fled to the neighboring Gorodets. On 5 August 1377, the Horde army conquered Nizhny Novgorod. The city was burnt. A year later, on July 24, 1378, the city was re-conquered.

Nizhny Novgorod-Suzdal did not participate in the 1380 Battle of Kulikovo. After the battle, the Horde Khan Tokhtamysh, in 1382 with a large army went to Moscow. When the Tatar army approached Nizhny Novgorod, Prince Dmitry Konstantinovich of Suzdal, wishing to save his land from ruin, sent his sons Vasily and Semyon to him, who went with the army and persuaded Moscow to surrender.

The death of Prince Dmitry Konstantinovich in 1383 triggered a decade-long war of succession between his brother and his sons. In the end, khan Tokhtamysh awarded Nizhny Novgorod-Suzdal to Vasily I of Moscow in 1392.

== Tsardom of Russia ==
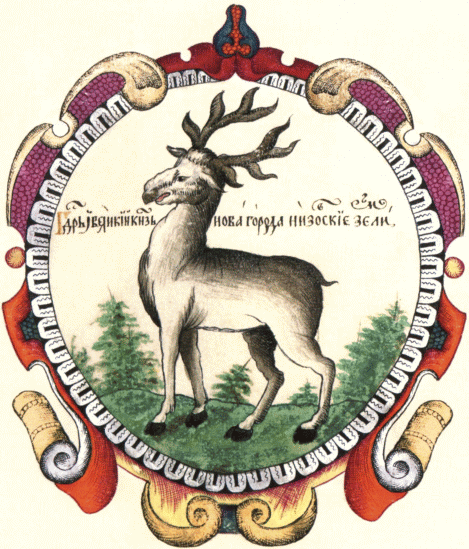
Seal of the Principality of Nizhny Novgorod. 1626

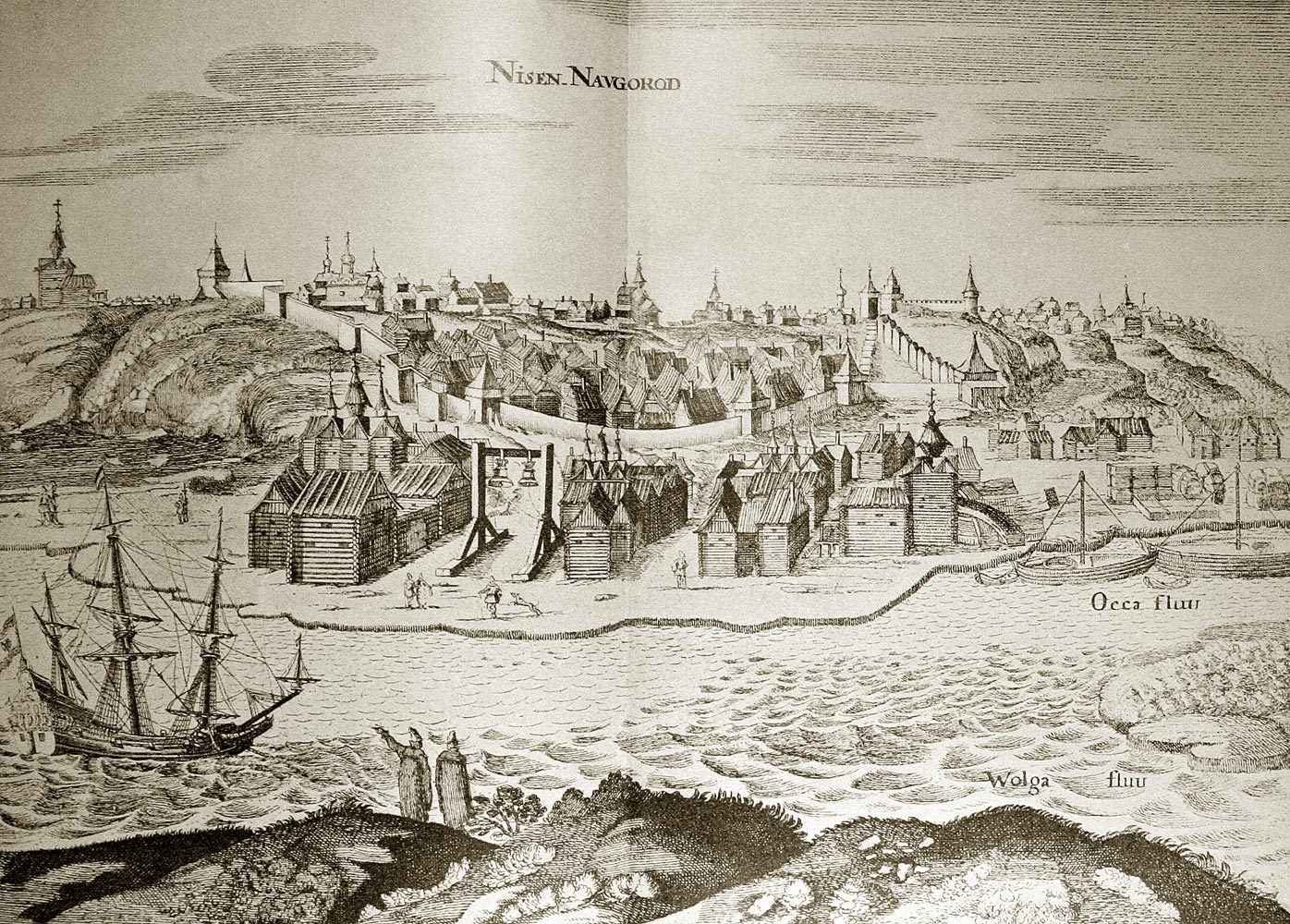
Nizhny Novgorod in the first half of the 17th century (from Adam Olearius's book Description of the travel to Muscovy, 1656)

In 1392 the Vasily I of Moscow received a jarlig to the Nizhny Novgorod-Suzdal Principality and conquered Nizhny Novgorod. The final accession of the principality to the possessions of Moscow took place at the end of the 1440s.

In 1408, the city was devastated during the invasion of the emir of the White Horde Edigu. In 1445 he was conquered by the troops of the Kazan khan Ulugh Muhammad.

In the times of Ivan III and Basil III, Nizhny Novgorod is a border post. He has a standing army and is a gathering place for troops in attacks on the Kazan Khanate. At the same time, a stone Kremlin is being built instead of a wooden fortress.

In September 1505, under the walls of the unfinished Kremlin, the attack of the Nogais and the Kazan Tatars under the leadership of the Kazan Khan Muhammad-Amin was repulsed. The attacking army included 40,000 Kazans and 20,000 Nogais. The leader of the Nogai, the brother-in-law of Mohammed-Amin, was killed by the cannonball that was released by Fedor Litvich. After that, there was a massacre between the Nogais and the Tatars and the khan was forced to relieve the siege.

After Vasily III's attack on Kazan in 1523, the city of Vasil was founded, which becomes a border town, instead of Nizhny Novgorod. After the conquest of Kazan by Ivan the Terrible, the role of Nizhny Novgorod becomes insignificant. In 1565, Ivan the Terrible divided the Russian state into oprichnina and zemshchina. Thus the city became zemstvo.

=== Time of Troubles ===
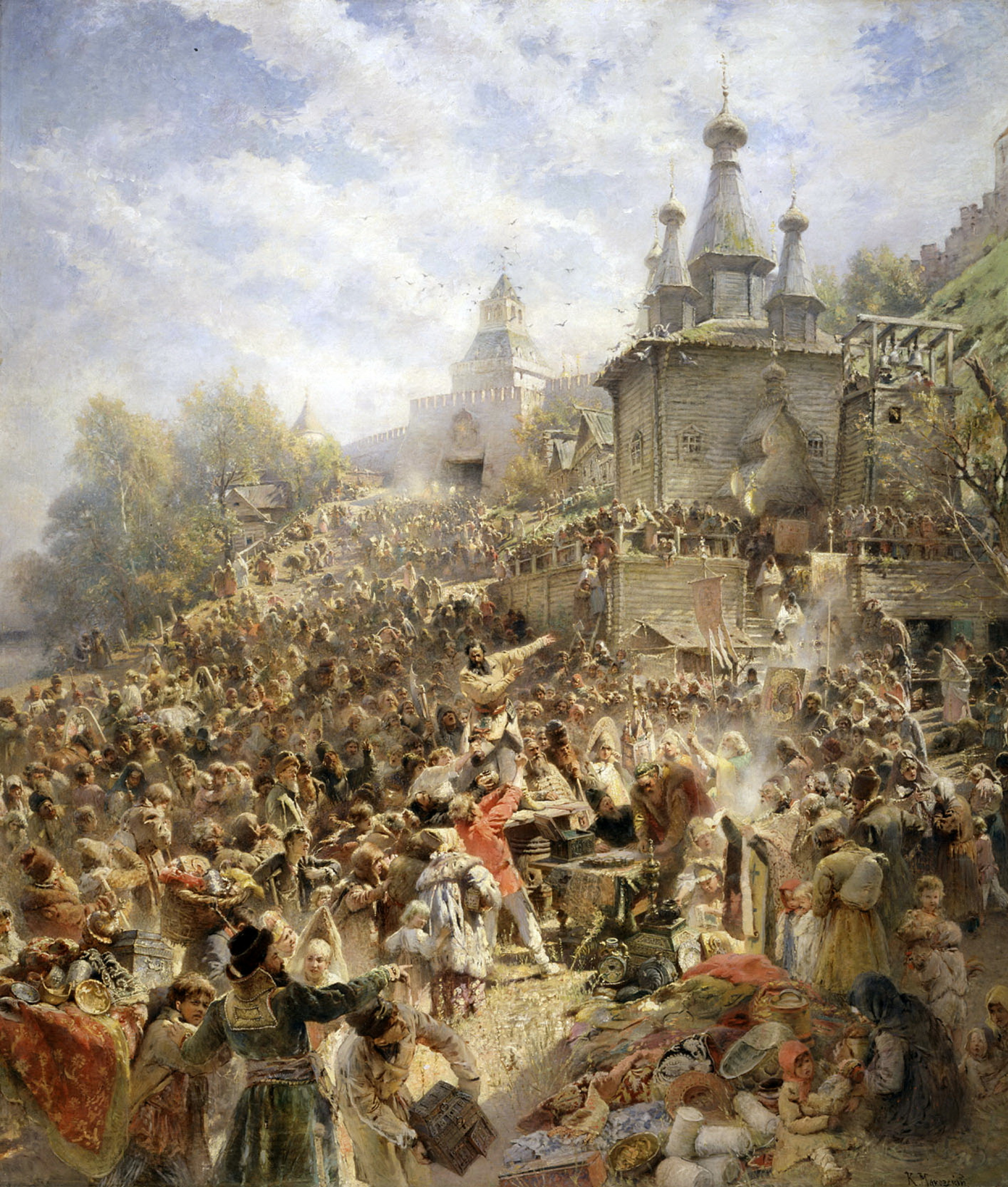
Kuzma Minin appeals to the people of Nizhny Novgorod to raise a volunteer army against the Poles (painting by Konstantin Makovsky, 1896).

In the Time of Troubles, Nizhny Novgorod, along with the Trinity Lavra of St. Sergius, continues to support Moscow. Then, almost the whole country and Moscow were in the Polish occupation. In 1611, there were no Poles in Nizhny Novgorod. Citizens elected the zemstvo elder (mayor) Kuzma Minin. He began calls for a liberation struggle among the people of the townspeople. Then he was supported by the city council of Nizhny Novgorod, voivodes, clergy and servicemen. By decision of the city council, a general meeting of Nizhny Novgorod citizens was appointed. They gathered in the Kremlin. Minin appealed to the people with an appeal to stand on the liberation of the Russia from foreign enemies. After that, the people began to make voluntary donations to create the army. In addition, the decree was issued to hand over a part of personal property. Minin was instructed to lead the collection of funds and their distribution among the warriors of the future army.

Then he raised the question of choosing a commander. At the second congress, the citizens decided to ask the head of the people's army of Prince Dmitry Pozharsky. His ancestral estate was in the Nizhny Novgorod district, 60 km from Nizhny Novgorod. The prince approached for the role of commander of the militia. He was a Rurikovich in the twentieth generation.

Pozharsky arrived in Nizhny Novgorod on October 28, 1611, and immediately, together with Minin, began organizing the army. Pozharsky and Minin continued to collect coffers and warriors, to seek help in different cities. After this, authorities were formed, which were not subordinate to the Moscow Seven boyars. However, this state of affairs did not suit the Poles and the seven boyars. Several attempts were made to eliminate the new power, but this did not happen. As the people's army moved towards Moscow, the cities were liberated from the Polish occupation, and the provisional power of Prince Pozharsky was established in them. October 22 (November 4), 1612, the troops of the People's Army liberated Moscow from the Poles. On this occasion, on October 22 (November 4), 1649, a holiday was instituted in Russia in honor of the Our Lady of Kazan. In today's Russia this day is celebrated as the Unity Day, since November 4, 2005.

In the 17th century, under Patriarch Nikon, there was a church split in the Eastern Orthodox Church. Because of this, numerous settlements of Old Believers were formed in the vicinity of Nizhny Novgorod. A lot of them were on the Kerzhenets River. To eliminate the split of churches in Nizhny Novgorod in 1672, the diocese is founded. The Archimandrite of Vladimir's Nativity Monastery Filaret became the first metropolitan of Nizhny Novgorod and Alatyr.

== Russian Empire ==

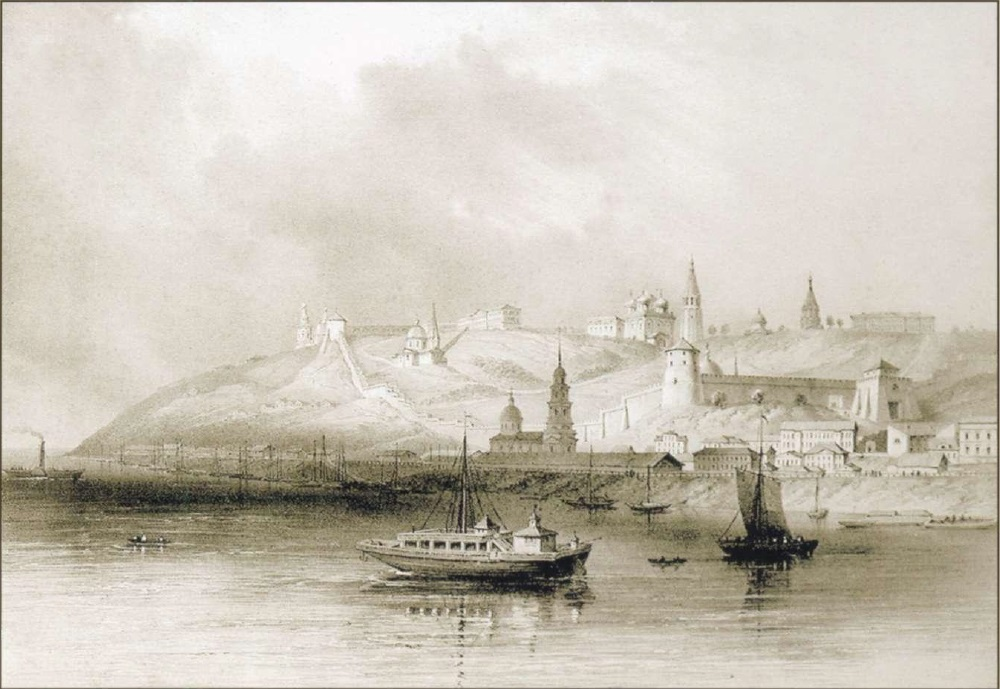
Lithograph by landscape painter Louis Pierre Bishebois "View of the Nizhny Novgorod Kremlin". 1840th

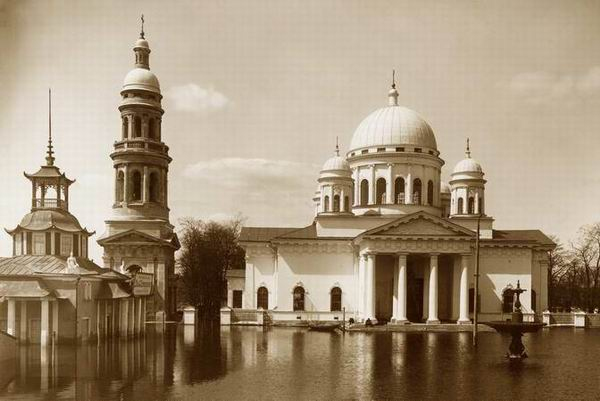
Transfiguration Cathedral

In 1695, during his Azov campaign, Peter the Great came to Nizhny Novgorod. After the regional reform, Nizhny Novgorod has become a gubernatorial city since 1719. In 1721, the episcopal chair was appointed archimandrite Pitirim, who founded Hellenic-Greek and Slavic-Russian church schools. In 1722 the city again visited Peter the Great, celebrating here the day of its 50th anniversary. Then he went to the Persian campaign.

In 1767 the city was visited by the Empress Catherine the Great. She did not like the city very much. She put it this way:

This city is a beautiful location, but the buildings is ugly ... everything either lies on its side, or it will soon fall.

During her stay in the city she was introduced to the local inventor-mechanic Ivan Kulibin. Subsequently, he was invited to the capital's palace.

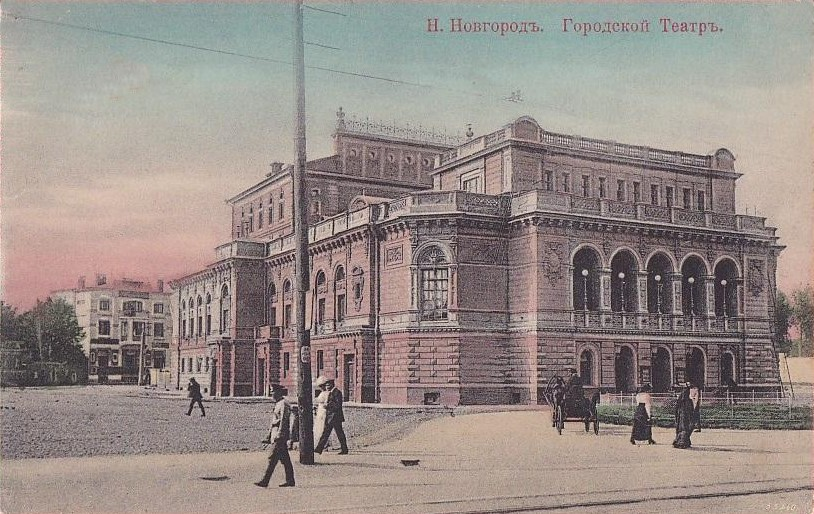
The Nicholas theater

After the visit of Empress Catherine II, a new regular city plan was drawn up, providing for a quarterly system. From 1770 to 1913 the Bolshaya Pokrovskaya Street was altered. It was built up by stone houses. In 1798 the first city theater was created. Later it became known as the Nicholas Theater in honor of Emperor Nicholas I. It is now called the Drama Theater.

In 1812, there was a war between Russia and France. After the French army attacked Moscow, Moscow landlords arrived in Nizhny Novgorod. There are rumors that after the fire in Moscow the capital will be Nizhny Novgorod. Among the arriving landlords are Nikolay Karamzin, Vasily Pushkin, Konstantin Batyushkov and Sergey Glinka, who organize their literary club here.

In 1817 in the village of Kunavino was moved Makaryev Fair. Previously, it was organized near the walls of the Makaryev Monastery. But, after the fire, it was decided to move it closer to Nizhny Novgorod. The fair gave rise to the rapid economic development of the city and the surrounding villages. The village of Kunavino became a large merchant settlement, later industrial enterprises were built on its territory.

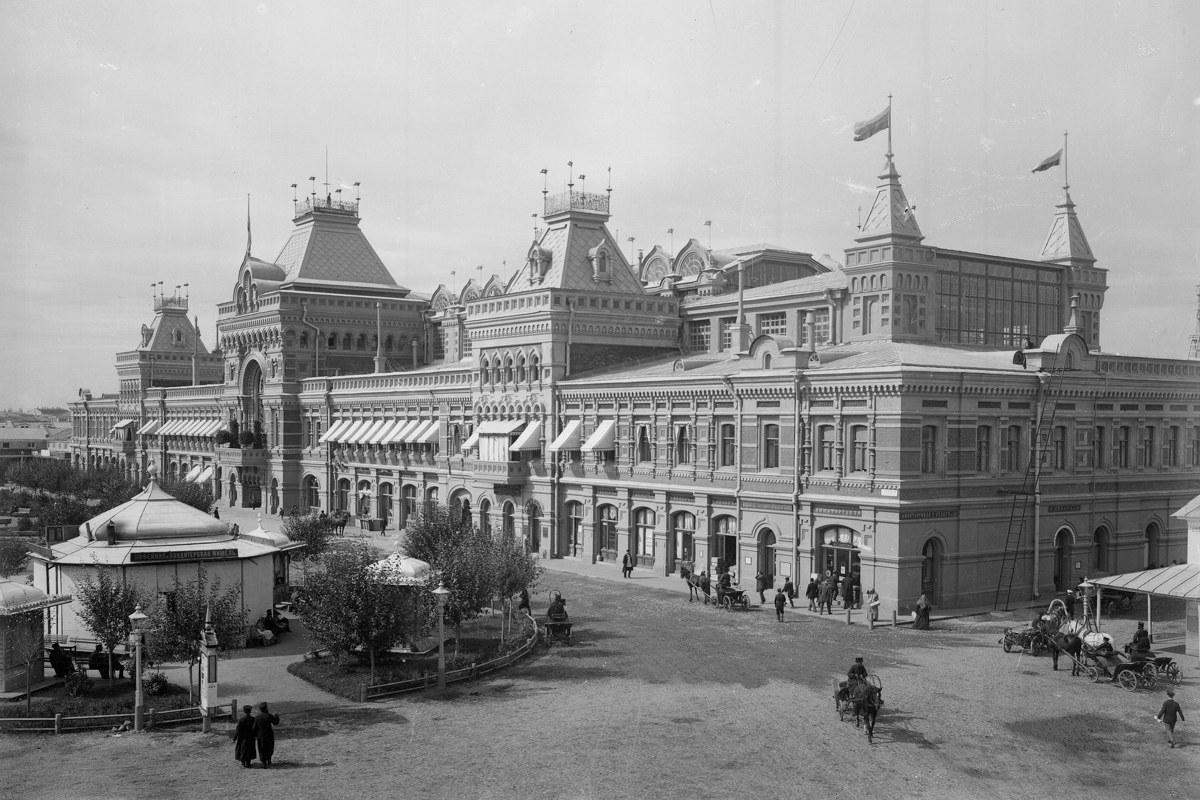
The Main Fair building. All-Russia Exhibition. 1896

In 1834 the city was visited by Nicholas I, who initiated the external reconstruction of the city. In 1847 a water pipeline appeared in the city and the first fountain was built. In the Kremlin, private buildings were destroyed and administrative buildings were built instead. Also, many new buildings, streets, boulevards and gardens were built.

In 1849, near Nizhny Novgorod, in the village of Sormovo was founded a large industrial enterprise Sormovsky plant. Since 1850, it has produced river steamships, railway cars, locomotives, motor ships, trams. Thanks to the plant, Sormovo turned into a large working village.

From 1862 the construction of the Moscow-Nizhny Novgorod railway was completed, in this line was built Moskovsky railway station. In 1895 it was extended to Sormovo. In 1904 the line of the Moscow-Kazan railway was built up to the Romodanovsky railway station.

=== All-Russia exhibition ===
In 1896, the city hosted the largest All-Russia exhibition. To this event a tram was opened in the city. The exhibition showed the world's first radio receiver of engineer Alexander Popov and the world's first hyperboloid tower of engineer Vladimir Shukhov. At the same exhibition, the first Russian car of the Frese and Yakovlev factories was demonstrated. The engine and transmission were manufactured by the Yakovlev factory, and the hull, chassis and wheels of the Frese factory.

=== 1905 Russian Revolution ===
In the spring of 1905, the socio-political situation in the city was out of the control of the authorities. Governor Pavel-Simon Unterberger reported to the police department:

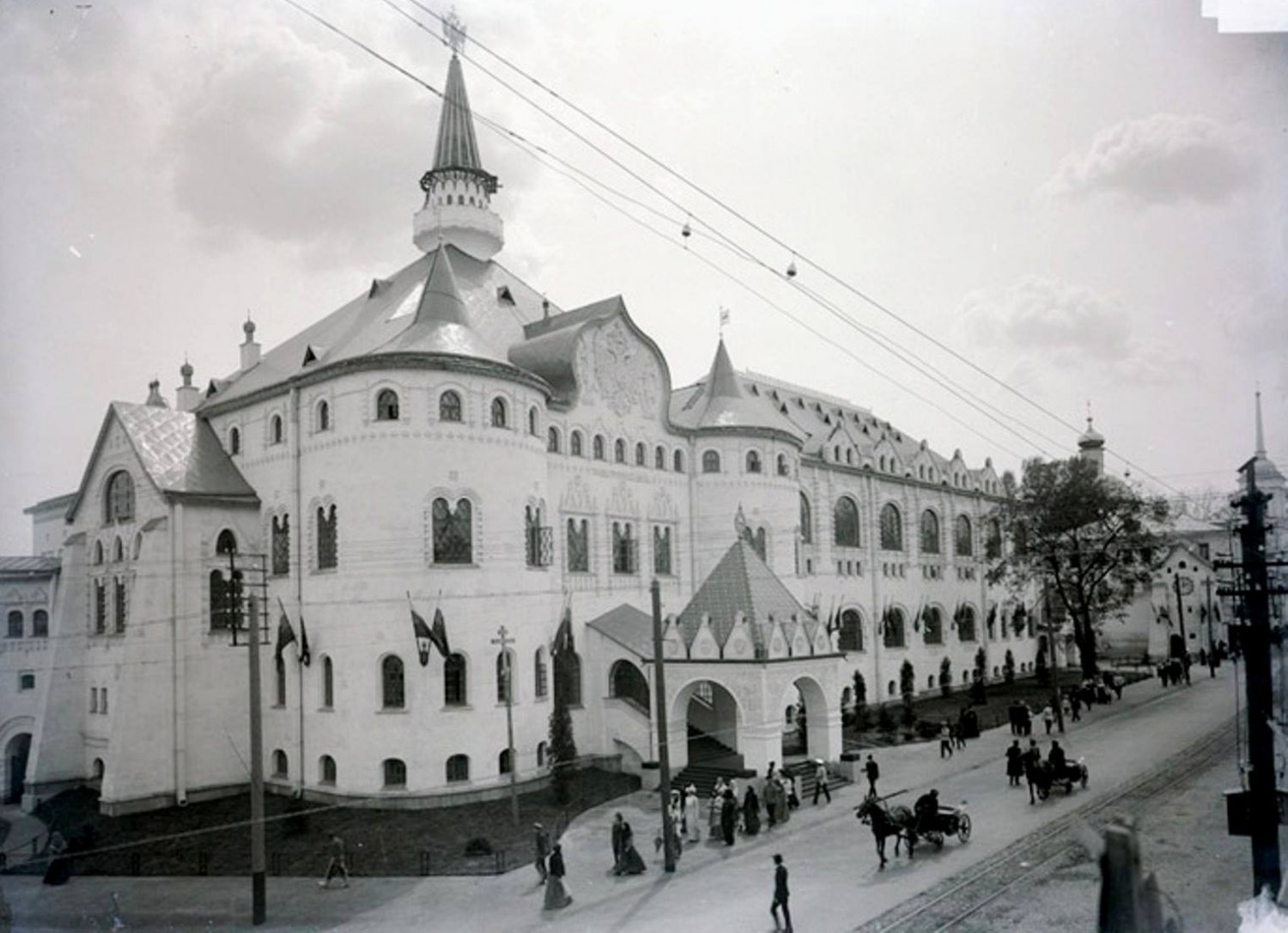
The State bank on Bolshaya Pokrovskaya Street

At the rallies, meetings, evenings, speakers make speeches by which they call upon the population and the working class to disobey the authorities, to overthrow the existing government, to universal armament and revolution. Proclamations of extreme parties are distributed at rallies and meetings, and donations are collected for general armament

In the first days of November 1905 he was recalled from Nizhny Novgorod. He was replaced by Baron Constantine Frederiks.

In December 1905, an uprising of the workers of the Sormovo plant took place in the districts of Sormovo and Kanavino, organized by local groups of several parties.

In April 1908, one of the strongest floods occurred. There were flooded: Rozhdestvenskaya Street, Kazansky Railway Station, Bugrov Mills and Kurbatov Plant. Also populated settlements-satellites were flooded: Sormovo, Gordevka, Kunavino and Molitovka. Which later became part of the city.

In 1913 a State Bank was built, which was opened by Emperor Nicholas II.

During the World War I, in 1915, the Felzer and Etna plants were evacuated to Nizhny Novgorod. In 1916, the city opened the first People's State University. In 1917, the Warsaw Polytechnic Institute was evacuated. On its basis was formed Nizhny Novgorod Polytechnic Institute.

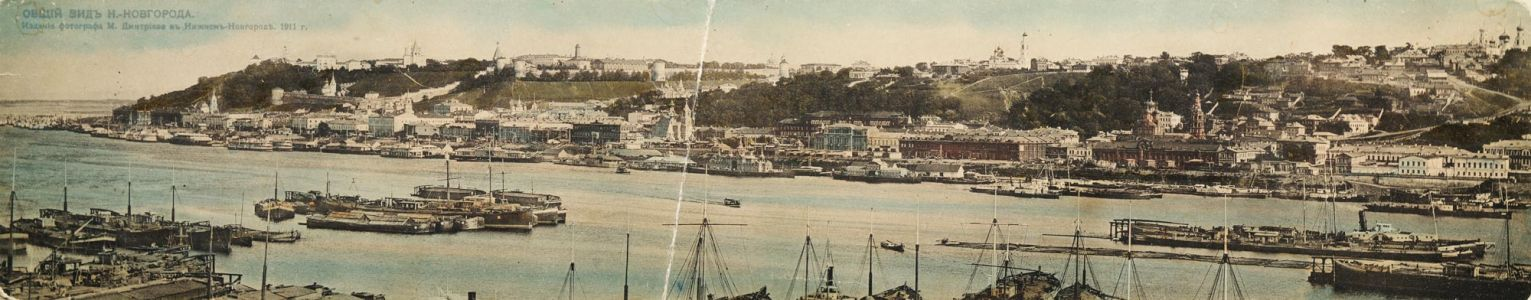
Nizhny Novgorod. 1911. Maxim Dmitriev

== Soviet era ==
Emblem of Gorky in Soviet Union

=== Revolutionary Nizhny Novgorod ===
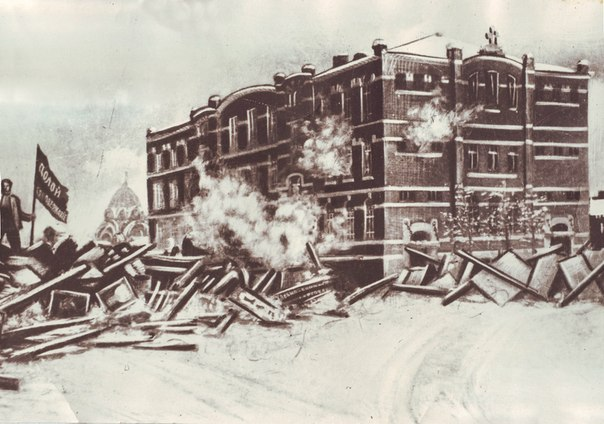
The main barricade near the Sormovo parish school. December 1905

After the February Revolution, the situation in the city began to heat up. In September 1917, preparations were made for the elections to the City Duma. In June, it became known that the population of the factory settlements - Molitovka, the Felzer plant and the Novaya Etna plant - was not included in the electoral lists. On June 14, workers went to a demonstration demanding electoral rights. The Duma was forced to make concessions by including these villages in the Kanavinsky constituency.

In the September elections, the victory was won by the representative of the Socialist-Revolutionary Party Vladimir Ganchel.

After the October Revolution, Soviet power in the city was established in the autumn of 1917. In 1919, Kunavino and Sormovo received the status of cities. Instead of the name "Kunavino", "Kanavino" gradually began to be used.

=== Industrialization ===
In 1929, the cities of Sormovo and Kanavino were abolished, and their territory was included in the Greater Nizhny Novgorod. The city began to be divided into districts. In the same year, the administrative division of the country in the governorates was abolished. Nizhny Novgorod Governorate is abolished. Nizhny Novgorod became the center of the Nizhny Novgorod krai (since 1932 - the Gorky krai). October 7, 1932 the city was renamed Gorky, in honor of the 40th anniversary of the literary and public activities of the writer Maxim Gorky. In 1933 the Gorky Krai expands and turns into the Gorky Oblast and Gorky becomes its center.

In the same year, the first stone Oksky bridge appeared in the city, which connected the banks of the Oka. It is now called Kanavinsky. Also, a railway bridge across the Volga was built, along which the railway to Vyatka passed. Then it became possible to get through the Gorky to the Urals and Siberia.

In 1932, the largest industrial enterprise of the Soviet Union, the Gorky Automobile Plant (GAZ), was launched. In 1930-1940-ies the city was even referred to as the "Russian Detroit". At the same time, around the GAZ was built a new Avtozavodsky City District. Now its population is about 300,000 people. Initially, it was conceived as a separate city, but later it was made a district of the city. Also, in 1932 a large river cargo port was established on the Spit of Nizhny Novgorod. It was of high importance not only for the city, but for the entire European part of the country.

=== World War II ===
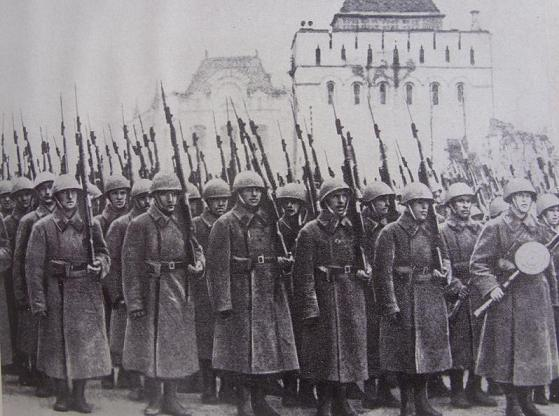
Soldiers of the 322nd Infantry Division before being sent to the front. Soviet Square. November 1941

In the territory of the city and the region, 56 Soviet military units and formations were created. In November 1941, in the city formed 72 units of the people's militia (34,568 people) who participated in the Battle of Moscow. In this territory, in the Eastern Front of World War II, 822,000 people fought for the Soviet Union. Of these, more than 350,000 people did not return from the battlefield. 130 sailors-submariners did not return from sea campaigns. 316 people were awarded for fighting feats of the highest award - the Gold Star of the Hero.

In November 1941, the formation of the Gorky Air Defense District began. The first Nazi air raids took place on the 4th of November and the next night. In 1942, Senior Lieutenant Pyotr Shavurin of the 722nd air defense missile made two successful rams, becoming the only Soviet pilot who had unconditional confirmation of two "battering" victories. In June 1943, the Luftwaffe carried out three large raids on the city, the main goal being the GAZ. 1631 explosive and 33,934 incendiary bombs were dropped on the city. At the GAZ - 1095 explosives and 2493 incendiaries. 50 buildings, more than 9000 conveyors and conveyors, 5900 units of technological equipment, 8000 motors, 28 bridge cranes, 8 shop substations, 14000 sets of electrical equipment and instruments were destroyed and damaged at GAZ. 254 residents of Avtozavodsky urban district and 28 air defense fighters died, 590 inhabitants and 27 fighters were wounded. The plant actually ceased to exist and was rebuilt anew only by mid-1944. In total during the war, Luftwaffe bombers made 43 raids on Gorky, of which 26 raids at night.

During the war in Gorky, an evacuation point and an evacuation base (in the river port) were created to service and distribute the flow of evacuees. In dozens of hospitals, more than 500,000 wounded soldiers were treated.

The city was the center for the Soviet production of weapons. Every second car, every third tank and every fourth artillery unit were manufactured at the city's enterprises.

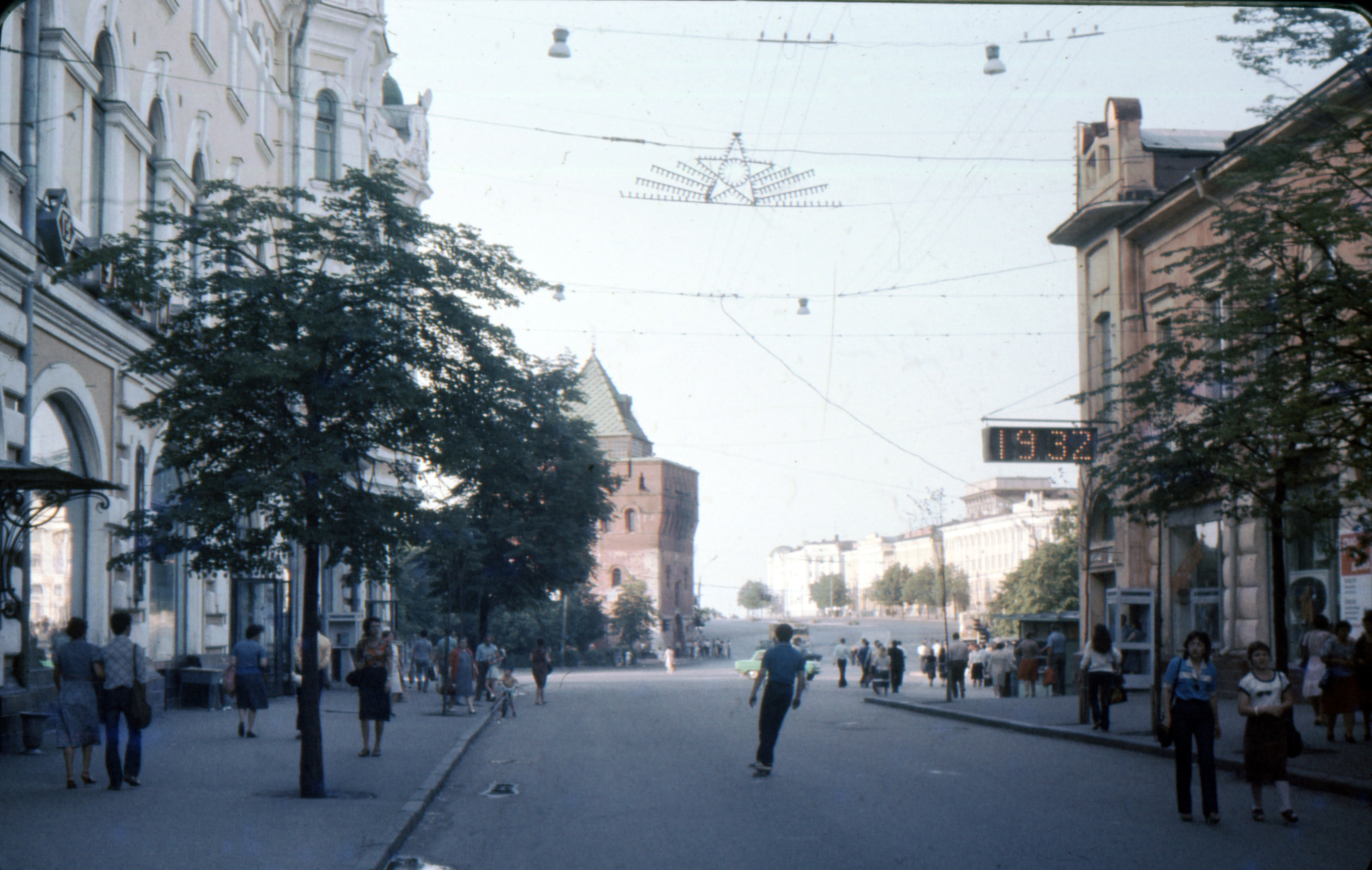
Gorky Center (Sverdlov Street)

During the war years, the Soviet Union sent to the front 38,000 tanks, self-propelled artillery systems, armored cars, 43,000 mortars, 16,000 aircraft, 22 submarines, 109,000 motor vehicles, more than 85,000 radio stations, as well as 101,000 artillery pieces and 1,165 Katyushas.

In memory of labor exploits, the Memorial "Gorky to the Front", in honor of the 30th anniversary of the Victory, was opened near the Kremlin walls.

=== Postwar years ===
In 1946 a GAZ-M-20 Pobeda light truck and a GAZ-51 truck left the assembly line of the Gorky Automobile Plant. In 1947 a trolleybus service was opened in the city. In 1949, the construction of the Chkalov Staircase was completed. October 7, 1949 there is a major catastrophe of a passenger river ship Finnish No. 6, carrying out the flight Gorky - Bor. In April 1951 the construction of the Gorkovskaya hydroelectric power station began. The first turbine of the station was launched on November 2, 1955. In 1957, the Krasnoye Sormovo plant produces a high-speed hydrofoil vessel Raketa-1 (chief designer Rostislav Alekseyev). The first amateur television center, located in the club named after Frunze, began work in 1953. The construction of the Gorky state television center was completed in the autumn of 1957.

=== Closed city ===
The defense enterprises located in the city (Krasnoye Sormovo, Sokol plant) attracted the attention of foreign special services. This served as the reason for the closure of the city: on August 4, 1959, the Council of Ministers of the Soviet Union issued a resolution "On the closure of the city of Gorky for visits by foreigners".

January 18, 1970 at the Krasnoe Sormovo Plant there was a radiation accident. During the construction of the nuclear submarine K-320 project 670 Scat there was an unauthorized launch of the reactor.

December 2, 1970 by decree of the Presidium of the Supreme Soviet the city was awarded the Order of Lenin.

In 1985, the city was opened a metro.

== Russia ==
Coat of arms of 2006

=== Perestroika ===
In the early 1990s, the status of the "closed city" was lifted, and the city became available for visits by foreigners.

October 22, 1990 by the Decree of the Presidium of the Supreme Soviet of the RSFSR Gorky was renamed back to Nizhny Novgorod.

=== 20th and 21st centuries ===
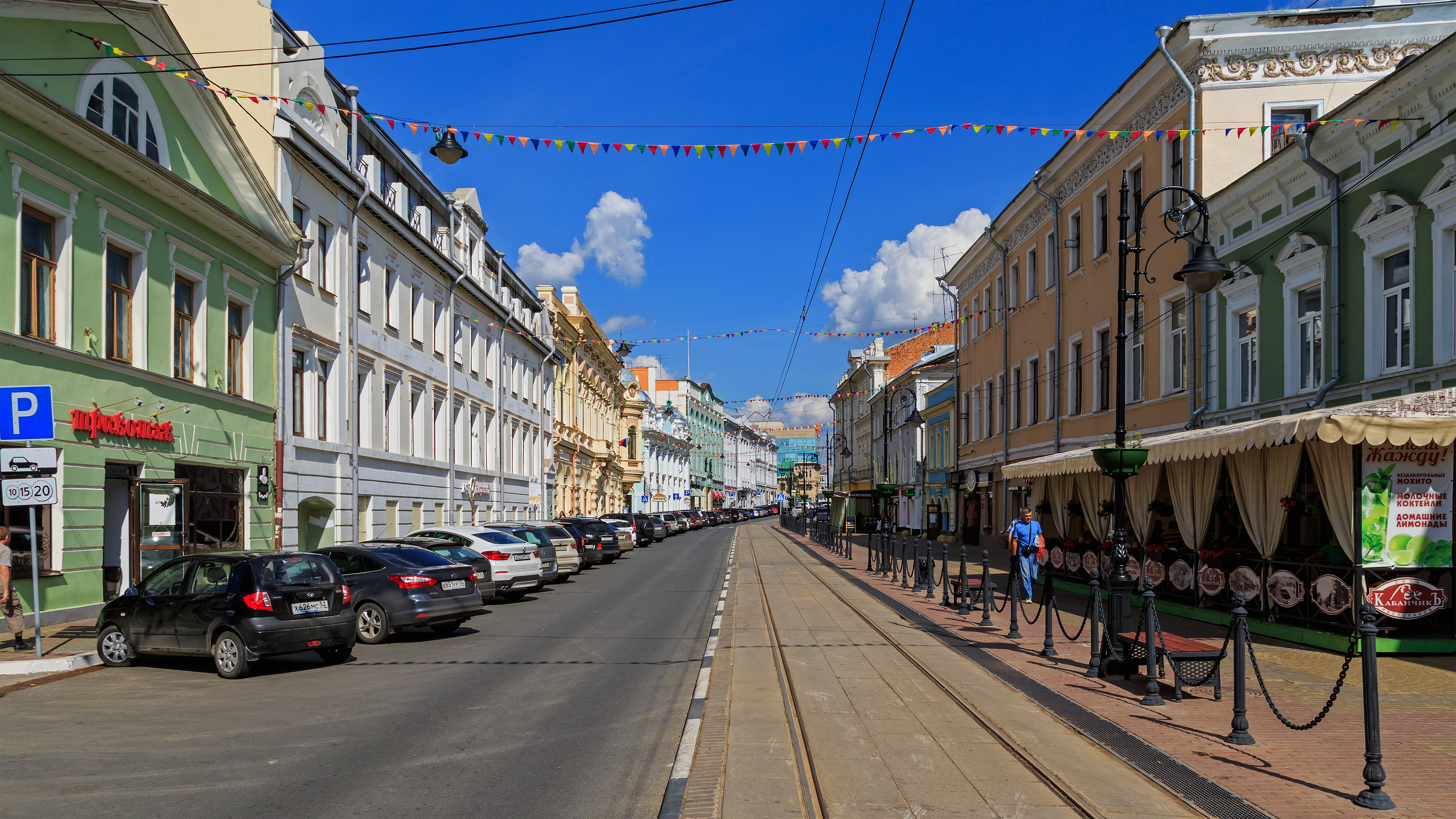
Rozhdestvenskaya Street after reconstruction in 2012

At the end of the 20th century, information technology began to develop in the city. Many commercial enterprises operating in the field of mobile communication, Internet and software development were opened. Nizhny Novgorod has become one of the largest and most famous Russian IT centers, maintaining this status for several years. In the territory of Nizhny Novgorod and the region, 8 mobile phone service providers provide services, which is unique for Russia.

One of the main problems in the 2000s was the transportation problem associated with the insufficient capacity of the three bridges connecting the Lower City and the Upper City, where the center of business activity was concentrated. In 2009, the automotive part of the new metro bridge was launched.

The move of business activity from the historical center to Lower City was planned back in the 1980s, in 2008 it was fixed in the general plan, but in 2009 it was sent for revision.

Since September 2011, work is under way to solve the problem of transport hubs in the city center: the approaches to bridges are expanding and improving. Because of the high traffic of the Borsky Bridge in February 2012, a cableway was built. It connects between Nizhny Novgorod and Bor. The daily traffic is about 5000 people. From July 31, 2017, the second automobile Borsky bridge will start operating.

International attention was drawn to Nizhny Novgorod in November 2011, when twenty-six mummified women and girls stolen from local cemeteries were found in the apartment of historian Anatoly Moskvin and his parents. Moskvin was suspected in a separate investigation into the Islamophobic desecration of Muslim graves by the Centre for Combating Extremism, who in a search of the Moskvins' apartment made the unexpected discovery of the bodies dressed as dolls.

=== World Cup 2018 ===
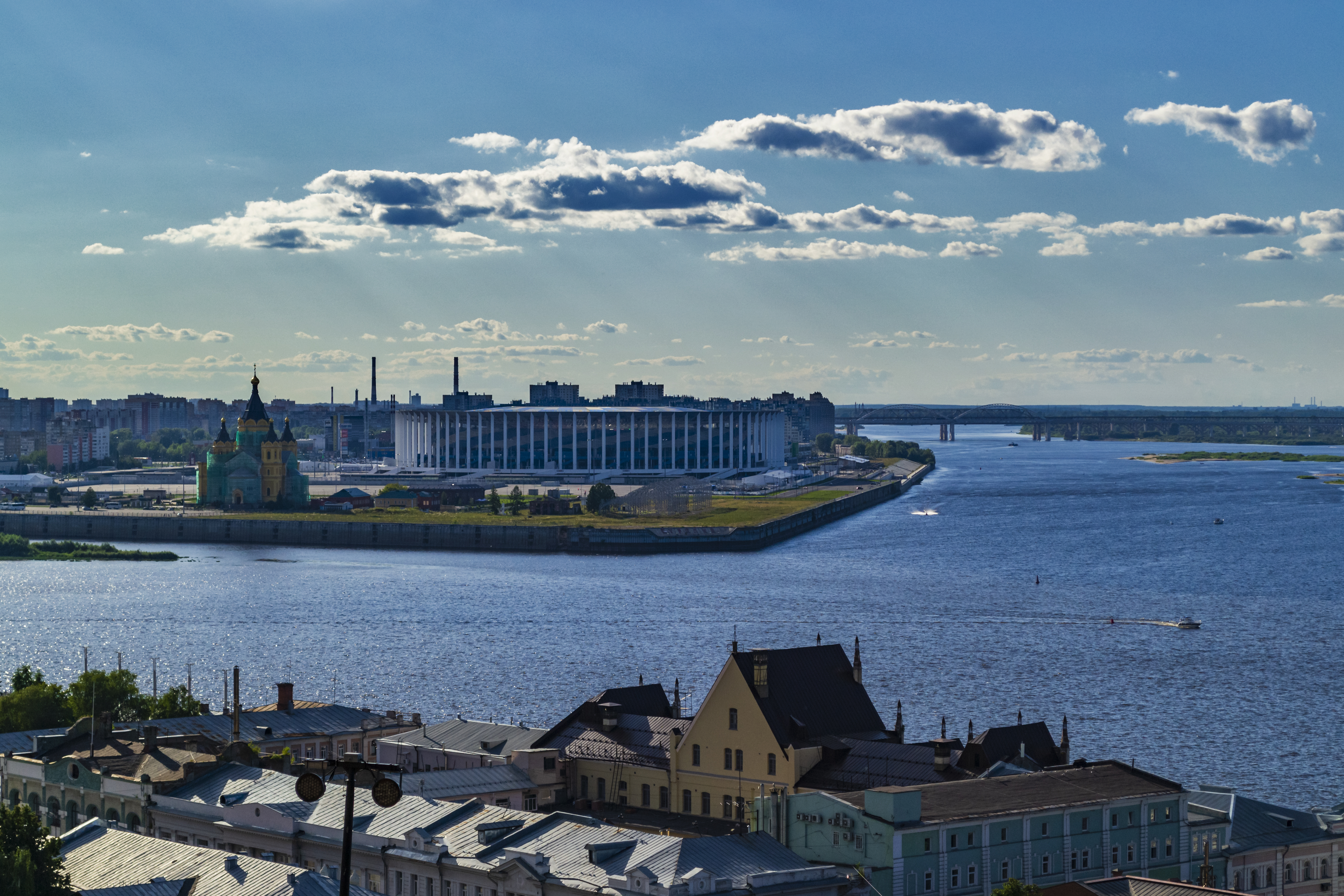
The Spit and stadium

In 2018, Nizhny Novgorod hosted the FIFA World Cup. In this regard, the city was completely restructured. First of all, the Spit was completely changed. A new stadium, an embankment and a park were built here. Near to the stadium was built a new metro station Strelka. The historic city center has also been transformed. All the ancient streets were restored, new museums were opened, and a grand FIFA Fan Fest took place on the main Minin and Pozharsky square. The 2nd line of the City Rail was also launched.

== Bibliography ==
- A. Gatsysky Nizhegorodian. Guide to Nizhny Novgorod and the Nizhny Novgorod fair. — N. Novgorod: Type. provincial government, 1875. - 60 p.
- Nikolay Khramtsovsky. A short outline of the history and description of Nizhny Novgorod. — 1859.
- V. Kuchkin The territory of the Suzdal and Nizhny Novgorod Grand Dukes in the XIV century. // Formation of the state territory of north-eastern Russia in X-XIV centuries. / V. Kuchkin; The responsible editor is academician B. Rybakov. - Moscow: Nauka, 1984. - Ch. 5.
- Martin, Janet (2007). Medieval Russia: 980–1584. Second Edition. E-book. Cambridge: Cambridge University Press. ISBN 978-0-511-36800-4.
- Boris Pudalov Written sources on the history of the Nizhny Novgorod region (XIII - early XVIII century): Textbook. — N. Novgorod: Publishing of the Nizhny Novgorod Pedagogical University, 2001. Opentext.
- Boris Pudalov The initial period of the history of the most ancient Russian cities of the Middle Volga region (XII-first third of the XIII century). Opentext
- Boris Pudalov Russian lands of the Middle Volga region (second third of XIII - first third of XIV century) Opentext
- D.Talovin The Great Nizhny Novgorod-Suzdal Principality (1341-1392) in the system of lands of North-Eastern Russia

=== Fiction ===
- Elvira Baryakina "Argentinian" (M: Ripol-Classic - 2011 — ISBN 978-5-386-03723-9) — The capture of the city by the Bolsheviks and the first years of Soviet power.
- Maxim Gorky «Mother» — about the labor movement in Sormovo in the early 20th century.
