= Bombing of Gorky in World War II =

Bombing of Gorky
- Part of strategic bombing during World War II
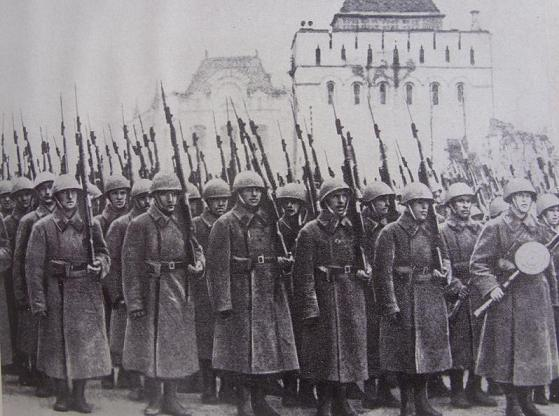
- Soldiers of the 322nd Rifle Division, before going to the front. November of 1941. Soviet Square, Gorky
Date	4 November 1941 – 23 June 1943
Location	Gorky, Russian SFSR, Soviet Union
Result	German victory

Belligerents
Soviet Union	(Nazi Germany) Germany

Strength
The 784th anti-aircraft artillery regiment: 515 antiaircraft guns; 17 radars; 231 anti-aircraft searchlight; 107 barrage balloons; 47 fighter planes	Bomber groups KG 27 and KG 55

Casualties and losses
- Military losses: 28; Civilian losses: 590

The bombing of Gorky by the German Luftwaffe was the most destructive attack on Soviet war production on the Eastern Front of World War II. It lasted intermittently from October 1941 to June 1943, with 43 raids carried out.

The main target was the Gorky Automobile Plant (GAZ), which was manufacturing T-60 light infantry tanks. Defences proved inadequate, though a full-size dummy model of the main factory, and a 'false village' of painted images on the ground, caused some confusion to enemy pilots. The whole plant was eventually destroyed, and an inquiry immediately demanded by Stalin. The plant was reconstructed in four months.

Gorky is the name of Nizhny Novgorod in 1932–1990, a city located deep in European Russia.

== Background ==
The destruction of Gorky's industry was in Operation Barbarossa from the very beginning. It was one of the largest manufacturers and suppliers of weapons for the Red Army. Germany planned to capture and occupy the city during the second half of September 1941. The city was the main center of the entire Volga region and in it was concentrated the main industry and state power over the regions. Occupation of Gorky meant for Germany complete control over the Volga region. First, the Germans were to destroy the defense industry of the city - Gorky Automobile Plant, Aviation Plant Nr. 21 "Ordzhonikidze", Krasnoe Sormovo Factory Nr. 112, and the Dvigatel Revolyutsii Diesel Engine Plant. After the occupation of the city, the General District of Gorky (German: Generalbezirk Gorki) or the General District of Nizhny Novgorod (Generalbezirk Nischni Nowgorod) was to be created, included in the Reichcommissariat Moskowien. Gorky Machine-building Plant (All-Union Machine-building Plant Novoje Sormovo, Joseph Stalin Factory Nr. 92, Zavod imeni Stalina, or ZiS) was planned to be converted to the production of German military equipment.

On 31 October 1941, Joseph Stalin ordered GAZ to increase the production of T-60 tanks.

The leadership of the city knew that Gorky could be attacked at any moment by German aviation. It was necessary to strengthen the city's air defense and mask factories. But the necessary measures were not completed.

Nikolay Markov, commander of the Gorky Brigade Air Defense District, was appointed in October 1941. Arriving in Gorky, he noticed that the defense of the city was not strong enough. There were only about 50 antiaircraft guns and very few searchlights.

== Attacks ==
=== November 1941 ===
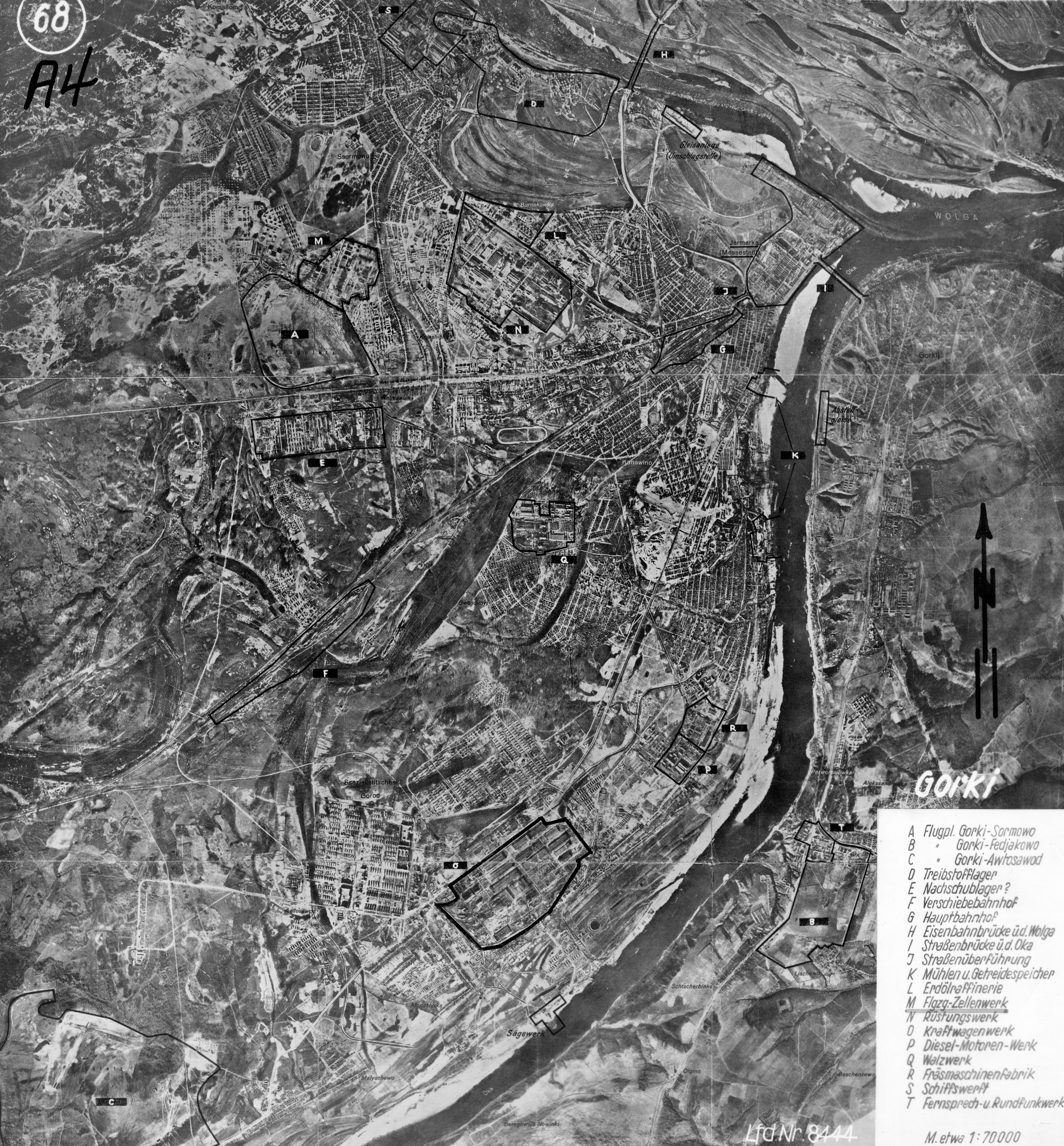
German map of Gorky, indicating targets for bombing Translation of labels on the map A — Gorky-Sormovo Airfield B — Gorky-Fedyakovo Airfield С — Gorky-Avtozavod Airfield D — Fuel warehouse E — Grocery warehouse F — Railway platform G — Main Railway Station H — The railway bridge across the Volga I — Oksky (Kanavinsky) Bridge J — Overpass K — Mills and barns L — Oil Refinery M — Aircraft Building Plant N — Defense Plant O — Automobile Plant P — Diesel Engine Plant Q — Rolling workshop R — Machine-Tool Plant S — Shipyard T — Radiotelephone Plant The Fair

Reconnaissance flights over Gorky began in the autumn of 1941. German planes flew at high altitude, braking over GAZ. The first scout plane, a Junkers Ju 88, appeared in the sky above the city on Thursday, 9 October. At first the Luftwaffe bombed the suburbs. The main blow fell on elevators and warehouses near Dzerzhinsk. This was followed by two large raids on Gorky. Heinkel He 111 aircraft of the Kampfgruppe 100 were involved.

The first raid, on the night of 4/5 November, began at 4:30 pm. According to air defense estimates, about 150 aircraft participated; 11 aircraft flew to the city. The planes approached individually and in groups of 3 to 16 at intervals of 15–20 minutes. The bombing lasted all night. In addition to bombs, leaflets were also dropped. GAZ, Nitel, and the Dvigatel Revolyutsii factory were struck, and 55 people died, 141 wounded. According to German data, 15 planes participated in this raid. The first aircraft appeared over the city while the sky was still light and dropped bombs. Then, using machine guns, they strafed people running in the street. A direct hit in the main building of the Nitel, killed the director and some other executives. During the night bombing, the main impact occurred on secondary objects – residential urban areas and the field in the Stakhanovsky village. The incendiary and high-explosive bombs weighing from 70 to 250 kg and heavy BM-1000 parachute mines weighing 871 kg were dropped.

The second raid took place on the night of 5/6 November. An air alert was announced. At 11:34 pm, the power lines from the Balakhna power plant to the city were damaged by a bomb strike. Some of the industrial regions temporarily lost power. At 01:47 am, the raid on Gorky began. The main impacts were on GAZ, Krasnoe Sormovo, Aviation Plant Nr. 21 "Ordzhonikidze", and residential buildings. The antiaircraft batteries were in operation, so bombing was less precise. According to air defense data, 14 aircraft flew over the city. In the GAZ area, 5 people died and 21 were wounded.

In the two raids, the main office of GAZ, a garage, a smithy, a stamping building, a professional technical factory, an archive, experimental workshops, a repair and mechanical workshop, mechanical workshop No. 2, power plant No. 2, a wheel workshop, a motor workshop No. 2, a foundry workshop of gray cast iron, a press workshop, and residential areas of the district were heavily damaged. The administration building of the Dvigatel Revolyutsii Diesel Plant was destroyed.

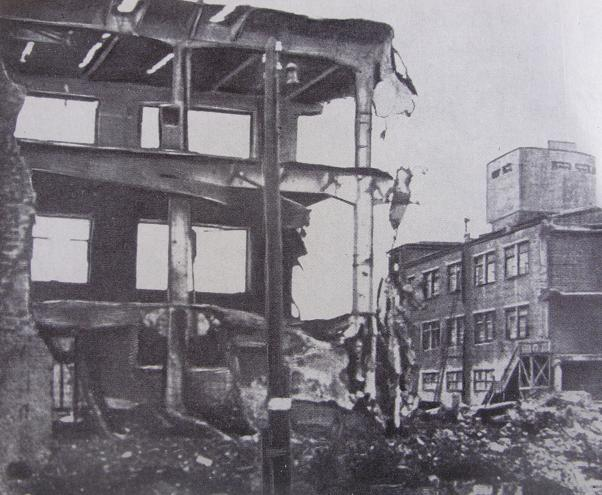
Nitel plant after the 4/5 November 1941 bombing raid

In several places there was panic (in addition to the raids, the Wehrmacht was already near Moscow). Part of the population began to leave the urban areas. Some plants stopped production, but the production of T-60 tanks by GAZ was still growing rapidly. (Note: Гордин А. (May 8, 2012). ""Мы у станков стоим, как у орудий": [автозавод в годы войны]" (газета) (in Russian) (Автозаводец ed.).) The paucity of antiaircraft guns allowed German aircraft to sight and bomb from low altitude. A total of 127 people died, 176 were injured severely, and 195 were wounded (data vary in different sources). A large number of the deceased were refugees from Moscow, resettled in the Avtozavodsky City District. No German aircraft were shot down.

On Saturday, 8 November 1941, the Gorky Brigade Air Defense District was reinforced by the 58th and 281st separate anti-aircraft artillery divisions, the 142nd Fighter Aviation Division and the 45th anti-aircraft search belt.

From Wednesday, 12 November to Tuesday, 18 November 1941, the Germans launched a series of raids by single-seat aircraft with the main purpose of destroying the Kanavinsky Bridge, but missed.

=== Bombing of 1942 ===
On the night of 3/4 February 1942, a single aircraft, shutting down its engines and, flying from a great height, broke through the air defense shield and dropped three bombs on GAZ. Wheel and engine workshops were damaged. 17 workers died, 41 were wounded. In this raid, for the first time, German agent spotters who had infiltrated into Gorky were seen. They carried out target designation, launching red and white signal flares from the ground.

On the nights of 4/5, 7/8, and 23/24 February, three attempts were made to attack Gorky. According to air defense, in the first raid of twelve aircraft in the city, only one got through, dropping five bombs on GAZ and Stakhanovsky village; in the second and third raids no planes got through. According to German data, on the night of 5/6 February, a single airplane raided.

In total, as a result of the bombing of February 1942, 20 people died and 48 people were injured. Damage inflicted to industrial facilities was insignificant.

At the end of May, five reconnaissance flights were carried out over the city.

On 30 May and 10 June, two unsuccessful bombing raids on Gorky, Bor and Dzerzhinsk were undertaken. According to air defense estimates, approximately 20 aircraft took part. For the defense of the most important objects, barrage balloons and the anti-aircraft guns of gunboats of the Volga Military Flotilla were first used. According to German data, the raids were committed on the night of 30 May.

30-31, from Sunday, 31 May to Monday, 1 June and 10 June (single aircraft). The bombing was carried out from a great height, about 50 bombs fell on the residential sector and repair base No. 97, where the tanks were assembled, which were done by Lend-Lease.

The single reconnaissance planes Junkers Ju 88 and Dornier Do 215 flew over the city from 1 to 5 June at different heights. On 23 June, Ju 88s from a great height, bombed the Aviation Plant Nr. 21 "Ordzhonikidze", but the bombs fell into the Sormovskiy Park.

On the night of Wednesday, 24 June to Thursday, 25 June, a group of aircraft dropped bombs on the outskirts of Gorky, in the vicinity of Strigino village. Another plane dropped two 500 kg bombs at the Aviation Plant Nr. 21, one of which did not explode.

On Monday, 27 July, the deputy squadron commander of the 722nd Fighter Aviation Regiment, Pyotr Shavurin, on MiG-3 intercepted the reconnaissance aircraft Ju 88D and knocked him down with a ramming blow. The planes fell in the vicinity of the villages of Kozlovka-Sannica-Tumbotino. The ramming blow was explained by the fact that the weak armament of the MiG-3 did not allow to effectively combat bombers. However, at that time, it was the only model of a high-altitude fighter in the arsenal of air defense. The wreckage of the German aircraft was collected and exhibited for viewing on the Soviet Square.

On the night of Thursday, 5 November to Friday, 6 November, a group of German planes made an unsuccessful attempt to bomb the Neftegaz refinery. At GAZ, 9 high-explosive and several incendiary bombs were dropped. As a result of the raid, the boiler room was badly damaged, 4 workers died, the plant did not work at all for 3 days, and then it did not work at full capacity for 3 weeks. Most of the incendiary bombs fell on the Gorky Machine-building Plant, several bombs exploded not far from the Moskovsky Railway Station. In this raid, German aviation first used light bombs.

=== June 1943 ===
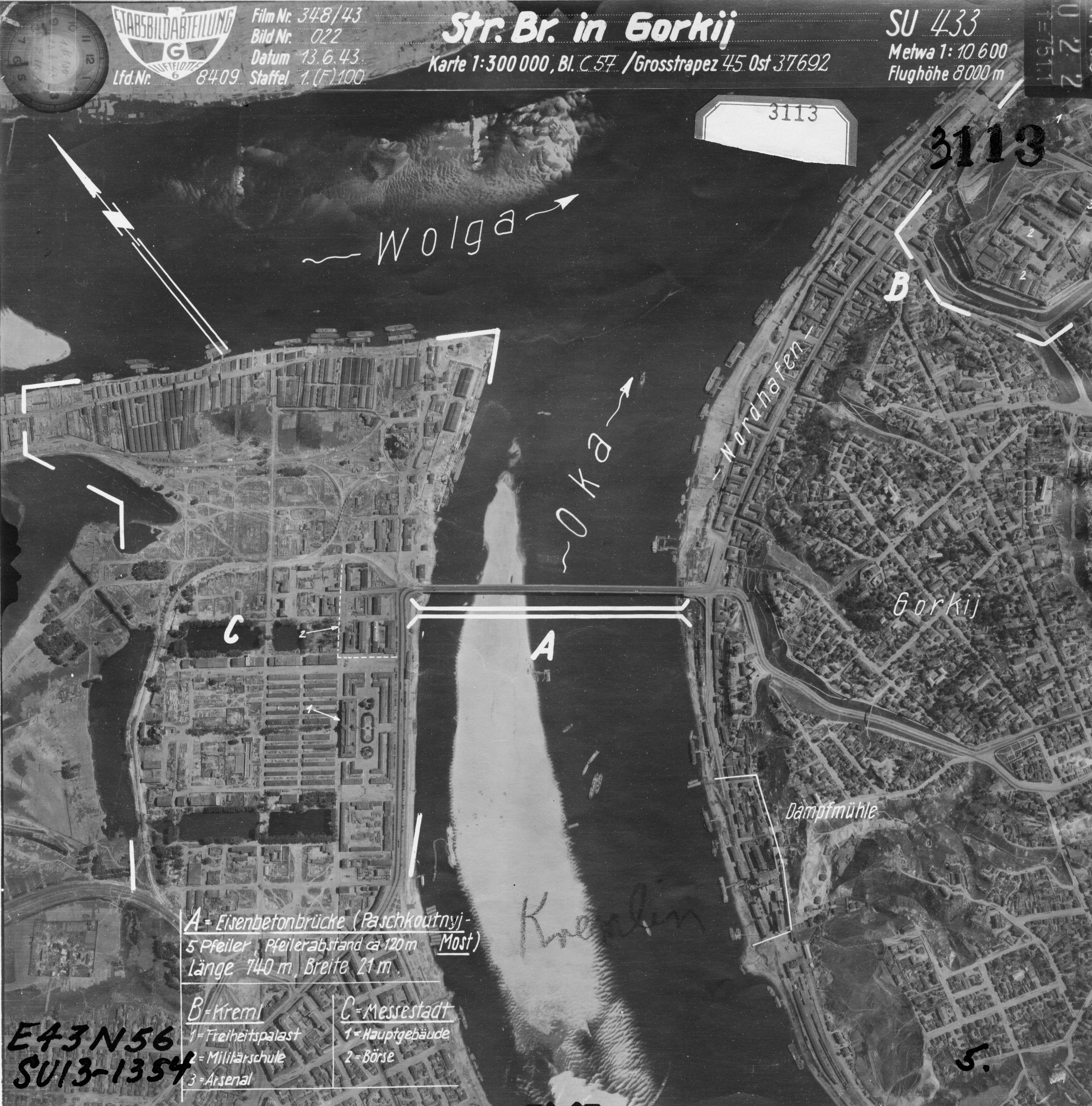
Aerial photography of Gorky with indication of targets for bombing. Strategic Center "Kremlin": Translation of labels on the map A — Reinforced (pontoon) bridge (5 supports, distance between supports ~ 120m, length 740m, width 21m); B - The Kremlin (1 - House of Soviets, 2 - Military school, 3 - Arsenal); С - The Fair (1 - The Main Fair building, 2 - Exchange); The mill (Dampfmühle) is surrounded by a white solid line.

In June 1943, after a prolonged calm, Gorky underwent a series of massive night attacks by German aviation. The main goal was again GAZ. The raids were carried out in preparation for a major offensive, Operation Citadel (summer-autumn 1943), during which German bombers struck the industrial centers of the Volga region - Gorky, Yaroslavl, and Saratov. It was one of the largest Luftwaffe attacks on the Soviet Union's rear during the entire war.

==== German aviation ====
Two-engine bombers of the squadrons KG 27 and KG 55 participated in the raids, which rose from the airfields near Orel and Bryansk and, bypassing the Moscow air defense zone, they flew up to Gorky from Dzerzhinsk, Bogorodsk and Arzamas. To use the darkest time of the day, bombardments were conducted from 12 am to 2 am. At first the target was designated as light missiles and air defense was blocked, then bombed from different heights and directions. Tactics changed every time. High-explosive, fragmentation and incendiary bombs of various calibers (up to 2,000 kg) and incendiary liquids were dropped into the city. The results of each raid recorded by reconnaissance aircraft flying over the city at an altitude of 7 km, at 5 pm the next day.

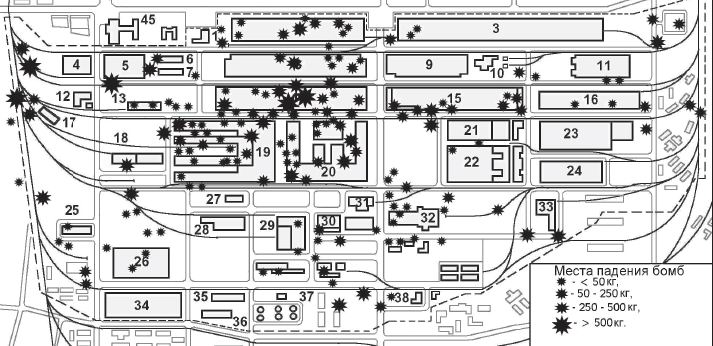
The Bombing of the workshops of Automobile Plant during an air raid on the night of 4 June to Monday, 5 June 1943

In the first raid on the night of 4–5 June, in order to cover up, the preparation of the Luftwaffe raid, an attack on Moscow was launched. According to air defense data, approximately 45 He 111, Ju 88 and Focke-Wulf Fw 200 took part in it. The planes flew from the directions Vladimir-Kovrov-Gorky and Kulebaki-Arzamas-Gorky. The bombing began at 12:45 am, about 20 planes broke through to the city. A total of 289 bombs were dropped, 260 of which were dropped on GAZ, the main conveyor, a spring workshop, and a smithy No. 3 were put out of operation. Several houses and a hospital were destroyed. In Avtozavodsky City District and at the plant, 70 people died and 210 were wounded. Attempts to break into the northern part of the city to the plants Krasnoe Sormovo, Aviation Plant Nr. 21 "Ordzhonikidze", and Gorky machine-building plant failed. (Note: Н.В. Колесникова (2005). ""Сто дней и ночей..." (По материалам фондов музея истории ОАО "ГАЗ")" (PDF) (журнал) (1-2(5-6)) (Нижегородский музей ed.): 68–71. Archived from the original (PDF) on February 16, 2016.) 5 German aircraft were lost. According to German data, 168 He 111 and Ju 88 aircraft participated in the raid, of which 149 aircraft attacked Gorky.

In the second raid on the night of 5 June –Tuesday, 6 June, according to air defense estimates, 80 He 111 aircraft participated. The bombing lasted from 12:31 am to 02:08 am. The raid was carried out by 6 groups from different altitudes and directions. Mainly, the western and northern sides of GAZ were attacked. The main power transmission line is disabled, the water supply network is badly damaged. Completely burnt assembly workshop, a department of adjacent industries, a rubber warehouse, a fleet of tow trucks, a locomotive depot, a chassis workshop, a dietetal. Finally, the main workshop burned down. About 100 bombs were dropped at the plant. The residential district and the tuberculosis hospital suffered. In the Monastyrka village 60-80 houses were burned and destroyed. According to German data, 128 planes were involved in the raid and 2 were lost. At the same time, some of the aircraft in the bombing of Gorky did not participate, but bombed Stalinogorsk.

The third raid on 6 June–Wednesday, 7 June was the most powerful, according to air defense. It involved 157 He 111 and Ju 88 aircraft (according to German data there were 154 aircraft, some of which bombed Stalinogorsk).

The main blow fell on the central and south-western parts of the city (GAZ, Sotsgorod, Myza). The wheel workshop of GAZ was completely destroyed by fire. Also, the tool-stamping body, the press-body and mechanical workshops, and the motive power depot were damaged. A total of 170 bombs were dropped at the plant. 38 people died, 83 were injured. The microdistricts of Sotsgorod, Americansky posyolok, and Monastyrka were severely damaged. Also, the telephone exchange, the district executive committee, the polyclinic, the central club, the electrical substation, the police station and the garage of the district committee of the CPSU (b) were damaged. Several houses on the Molotov avenue (now avenue of October) were destroyed. In the Avtozavodsky district 73 people died, 149 were injured. Artillery shot down 4 aircraft, and fighter planes shot down 2 aircraft.

On 7 June, Germany announced on the radio about the destruction of an automobile plant in Gorky.

In the fourth raid on 7 June–Thursday, 8 June, 50-60 aircraft participated. At the plant broke 3 of them. 9 high-explosive and 7 incendiary bombs were dropped, the cast iron smelting foundry and the residential area suffered, according to air defense data. Six planes were shot down. According to German data, 39 tons of bombs were dropped on the city.

According to the results of 4 raids in the plant, 993 air bombs were dropped. According to the medical service, 698 people were injured: 233 people died, 24 people died from wounds in hospitals, and 465 were injured.

In the fifth raid, on Saturday, 10 June–Sunday, 11 June, from 50 to 110 aircraft participated, according to different data. The fire from heavy anti-aircraft guns met the aircraft on approach to the city, bombs were dropped from altitudes of 4,000–5,500 meters and wore more chaotic character. GAZ, thermal power station, water intake, harbor, residential quarters in Leninsky and Voroshilovsky City Districts, as well as villages: Lyakhovo, Monastyrka, Shcherbinka and Myza airfield were attacked.

The sixth raid on Tuesday, 13 June–Wednesday, 14 June, from 50 to 80 aircraft participated. The eastern part of GAZ was attacked. According to German data, planes flew in small groups along the route Ryazan - Murom - Pavlovo - Gorky. As a result of the bombing, the water intake station of the Leninsky City District was damaged. 16 high-explosive and 20 heavy incendiary bombs were dropped on the Dvigatel Revolyutsii plant, several buildings and part of the roof of the main workshop of the machine-tool plant were destroyed. The shipyard was also attacked. The Kommodore of the KG 27 Oberstleutnant Hans-Henning Freiherr von Beust personally supervised the actions of German pilots. His plane flew over the city at high altitude. Gorky Machine-Building, Aviation Plant Nr. 21 "Ordzhonikidze" and Krasnoye Sormovo plants, as well as bridges across the Oka and the Volga, were not affected.

The seventh raid on Wednesday, 21 June–Thursday, 22 June was the last. Since this was the second anniversary of Germany's attack on the Soviet Union, both sides were preparing for the fight. According to air defense, 75 aircraft participated in the raid. 40 planes broke through to the city. On the territory of GAZ were dropped: 31 light flares, 15 explosive, 80 combined, and about 300 small incendiary bombs. The foundry, the reinforcing-radiator building and the plant Novaya sosna were damaged. In the residential quarter there were four fires. According to German data, the entire Lower City, the Vorobyov machine-building plant, the plant of food concentrates, residential quarters were attacked. Several power lines were damaged. Attempts to destroy Oksky (now Kanavinsky) and Borsky bridges failed. The Geschwaderkommodore Hans-Henning Freiherr von Beust again participated in the raid. During the bombing, 88 people died and 180 were injured.

According to the results of the operation, German bombers had carried out 43 raids, 26 of which were at night, a total of 645 sorties were carried out by German aircraft, 1,631 high-explosive and 3,390 incendiary bombs were dropped on the city. 254 civilians and 28 air defense soldiers died, more than 500 civilians and 27 soldiers were injured. At the plant, 52 buildings were destroyed, a large number of equipment was put out of operation. Strong fires arose because of the hot weather. Also, the spread of fires contributed to the wooden materials to mask the GAZ. A significant part of the plant was destroyed or burnt. Although he continued to work, but the output basically stopped, all the workers' forces were thrown at its recovery. The Luftwaffe could not develop its success further, after the destruction of GAZ. In subsequent raids, secondary industrial objects and residential areas were attacked, which were less protected. Industrial enterprises in the northern part of the city almost did not suffer from bombing.

==== Consequences of bombardments ====
The bombing of the largest industrial center of the country caused an immediate reaction of the supreme power of the Soviet Union. On 2 June, Stalin personally created a resolution of the State Defense Committee No. 3524 "On the Air Defense of Gorky". To investigate the reasons for the failure to fulfill the tasks, a commission was appointed, consisting of the head of the NKVD Lavrentiy Beria, the chief of the NKGB Vsevolod Merkulov, the secretary of the Central Committee of the CPSU (b) Alexander Shcherbakov, the chairman of the Moscow Soviet Vasily Pronin and the commander of the air defense of the country Mikhail Gromadin.

After the commission's investigation, the commander of the air defense of the region, Major General Alexei Alexandrovich Osipov was demoted and GAZ director Alexander Lifshits was removed from his post. On June 8, 100 anti-aircraft guns of small and medium caliber, 250 large-caliber machine guns, 100 searchlights and 75 barrage balloons were allocated for the intensification of air defense of the Gorky industrial region. The restoration of GAZ was started almost immediately, on the initiative of the chief designer Andrei Lipgart. Immediately after the first raid, the design archive of the plant was evacuated, gasoline was removed from the territory and dismantling of camouflage shields that caused fires began.

Semyon Ginzburg, people's Commissar for Construction, arrived in Gorky to deal promptly with the reconstruction.

== Air defense of the city ==
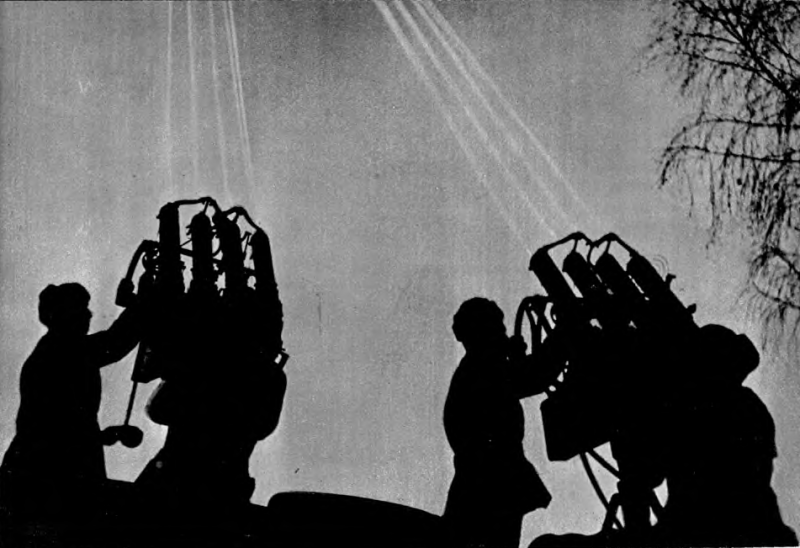
The defense of Gorky

In October 1941, Colonel Sidor Slyusarev arrived at the Seimas airfield to receive three new regiments equipped with LaGG-3 fighters. Here he stayed for a while, trying to calm the turbulent situation in the city.

After the November attacks on Gorky, the colonel received an order from Stalin to immediately leave for the city to defend the Gorky district, as the commander-in-chief put it. Slyusarev set off on the same night, despite the snow and frost. Later he told:

There was a problem, how do I get to Gorky. The dark night, the road is empty and there are no people. I decided to walk to the city, and the distance from the Seima to Gorky is about 50 km. An hour later, in the direction of Gorky, a ZIS-101 car appeared. I got up across the road and raised my hand, but the driver walked round to my right and continued to leave at an increased speed toward the city. I snatched the revolver and opened fire up. The passengers of this car, probably, were frightened and stopped. They were some leaders from Moscow. After a sharp conversation with them, I got into the car and by dawn I drove to Kanavino, where at that time the City Executive Committee was located.

First, Colonel Slyusarev ordered the creation of day and night patrols of Gorky. Immediately after this decision, he went back to the Seimas, where eight air regiments were stationed. He ordered them to be dispersed over the airfields of the division area.

In December, the organizing committee decided to create several large bomb shelters in the Upper City. By 15 February 1942, it was planned to build 5 facilities:

1. The Kremlin - Ivanovsky descent under the Minin garden,
2. The Zhdanov Embankment (now the Verkhnevolzhskaya Embankment) - In front of the Gorky Industrial Institute,
3. Pochtovy descent on Mayakovsky Street,
4. Kazansky Railway Station,
5. The ravine at the end of Vorobyov Street (now Malaya Pokrovskaya).

They were built by 2,300 people. Also, citizens throughout the city were digging trenches and erecting defensive fortifications, because of the German offensive near Moscow. However, later they were not needed, since on 5 December 1941, the Red Army launched an offensive.

=== Air defense actions ===
Air defense in the city had 433 medium-caliber guns and 82 small caliber guns, 13 SUN-2 gun radar gunposts, two Pegmatit radar (RUS-2s), 231 antiaircraft searchlights, 107 barrage balloons, and 47 fighter aircraft based at Strigino, Pravdinsk and Dzerzhinsk aerodromes.

Despite the considerable number and equipment of air defense forces, to prevent the aiming bombing, it was not possible. The prolonged absence of bombardments and the successful offensive of the Red Army contributed to a weakening of vigilance, there were many shortcomings in the organization of defense. Avtozavodsky City District defended the 784th anti-aircraft artillery regiment, which consisted mainly of girls who had recently joined the army.

One of the Pegmatit radar had a large "dead zone" in the sector because of the high bank of the Oka River. Detachments of gun-pointing stations were also unprepared and antiaircraft artillery fired without precise target designation, interaction with searchlights was not worked out. Air defense command posts in the cellars of the buildings went out of order when they were destroyed, wire telephone communications were often interrupted by bomb explosions. Fighter planes had no experience of fighting at night and tried to ram bombers with full ammunition. Most of the air defense forces also defended the northern industrial area of the city, where the Aviation Plant 21 "Ordzhonikidze", Krasnoe Sormovo and Gorky machine-building plants, which were of great strategic importance, were located.

=== Masking Gorky ===
In addition to the city's anti-aircraft defense, the government of the Soviet Union decided to build a number of "false objects" in Gorky. The archive of Nizhny Novgorod retained the resolution of the Gorky City Defense Committee "On the Construction of False Objects of Gorky Industrial Enterprises" of 1 August 1942.

In order to divert enemy aircraft from defense facilities, the Defense Committee decides:

1. To create on the approaches to Gorky a number of false objects imitating the real defense facilities of the city.

Provided by the Gorky Corps Air Defense District and the Gorky Main Military District headquarters, the dislocation of false objects is to be approved.

To propose to the directors of the plants: No. 21 "...", No. 92 "...", No. 112 "...", Molotov's plant "...", Lenin's plant "..." and glass plant of Maxim Gorky "..." immediately develop projects of false objects, coordinate them with the headquarters Ministry of Defense of the city and carry out construction until August 15 this year.

2. The directors of these enterprises shall provide facilities with communication and special commands for the protection and execution of special command instructions in air raids.

3. The procedure for prompt commissioning of false objects is to be developed by the commander of the Gorky Corps Air Defense District jointly with the Chief of the Ministry of Defense of the City of Gorky.

Chairman of the Gorky Defense Committee M. Rodionov

As a result of this decision, a huge model of GAZ was built in the village of Mordvintsevo, near Fedyakovo. It was built of glass and plywood. At night, the light was on its territory, which was turned off with a delay after the announcement of an air-raid. German bombers began to get confused and bombed a dummy instead of the plant itself.

Another important strategic object for disguise was the Dvigatel Revolyutsii plant. By that time it was already badly damaged, but continued to operate. To camouflage the plant, the "Moscow" technology of coloring streets was applied. Images depicting homes and urban buildings were painted on the street and in the plant. Thus, the Molitovka village was "extended" to the territory of the plant. The Dvigatel Revolyutsii plant visually disappeared for the pilots. From high altitude all that could be seen was the false village.

On the Oka bridge, a different masking technique was used. For this, boats were launched onto the water, which were alongside the bridge all the time. When announcing the air alarm, they released a special dense smoke screen. Thus, the German pilots could not attack the bridge because of poor visibility.

== Reconstruction ==
=== Reconstruction of GAZ ===
Reconstruction work began during the bombing. Construction and assembly brigades from Moscow, from the Urals, Siberia, and Central Asia were involved. The total number of employees reached 35,000. For propaganda purposes, on 7 June, the out-of-office newspaper Pravda began working at the plant. First of all, a wheeled workshop was started, the main reconstruction work was completed for 4 months. The official date of the reconstruction of the plant was 28 October 1943. On this day, 27,000 builders reportedly signed a report that was sent to Joseph Stalin.

== Bibliography ==
- Свастика над Волгой. Люфтваффе против сталинской ПВО at Google Books
