= Nitel =

Nitel or NITEL may refer to:

- An RPG Group company based in Bhopal State in India, working in telecom infrastructure
- NITEL (Nigerian company), Nigeria's principal telecommunication company
- NITEL (Russian company), a Russian TV sets manufacturing company located in Nizhny Novgorod
