= Romodanovsky railway station =

Former station of the Nizhny Novgorod Moscow-Kazan railway

Coordinates: 56.3165°N 43.9707°E

Romodanovsky railway station Ромодановский вокзал
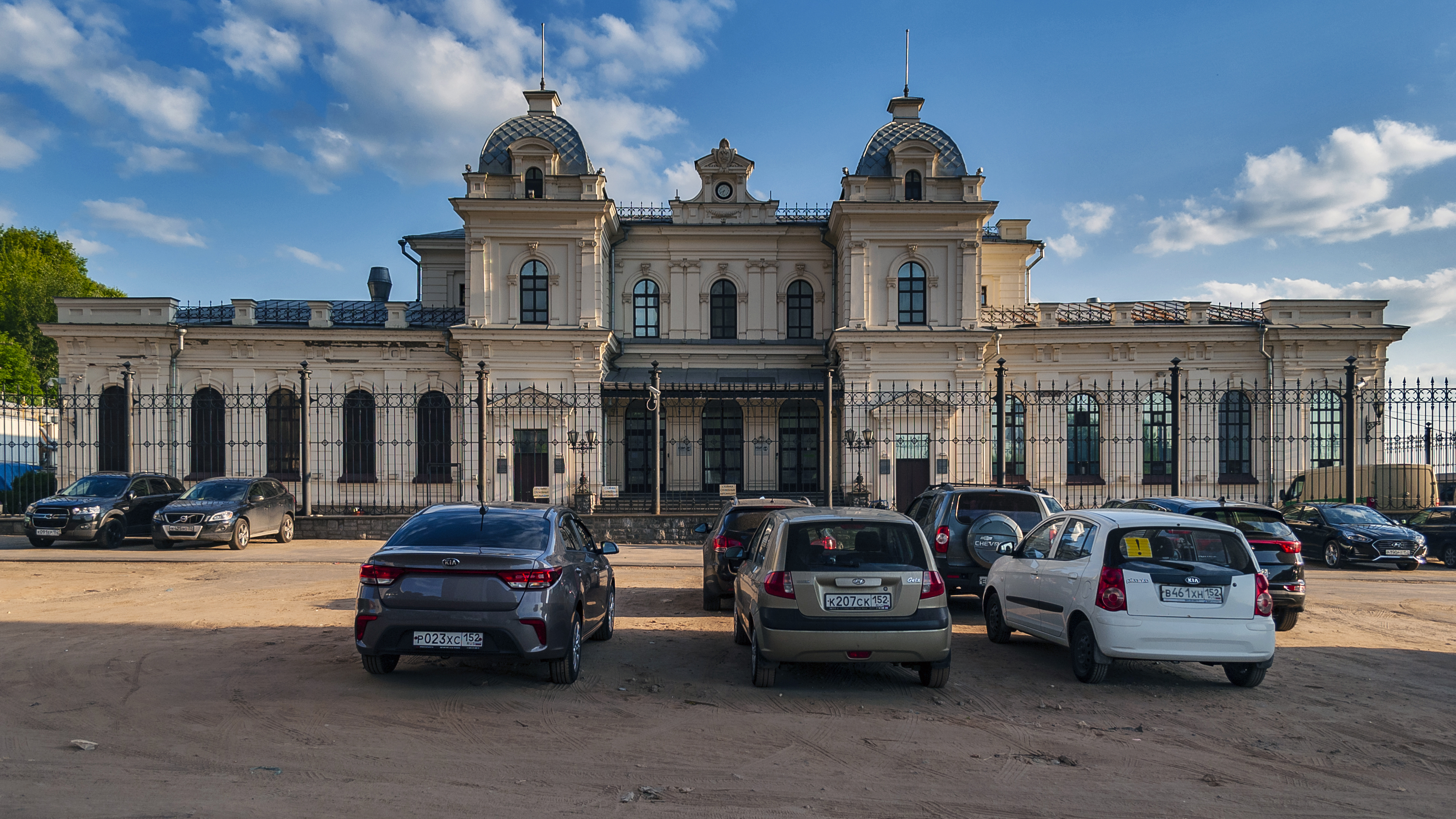
- Station building

General information
- Location: Kazanskaya square, 1, Nizhny Novgorod, Russia

History
- Opened: 1904
- Closed: 1974
- Pre-grouping: Gorky Railway
- Post-grouping: Novakard
Location

Romodanovsky railway station (Kazansky railway station) is a former railway station in Nizhny Novgorod. Construction of this station started in 1900 and was completed in 1904. The station was functional until 1974.

The building is located at 1 Kazanskaya Square and is now occupied by Novakard (a manufacturer of transport cards for Nizhny Novgorod), the Oblast, and the city of Vladimir, the latter of which completely restored the station building and retained part of the transport business. Visitors need to obtain permission to visit.

== History ==
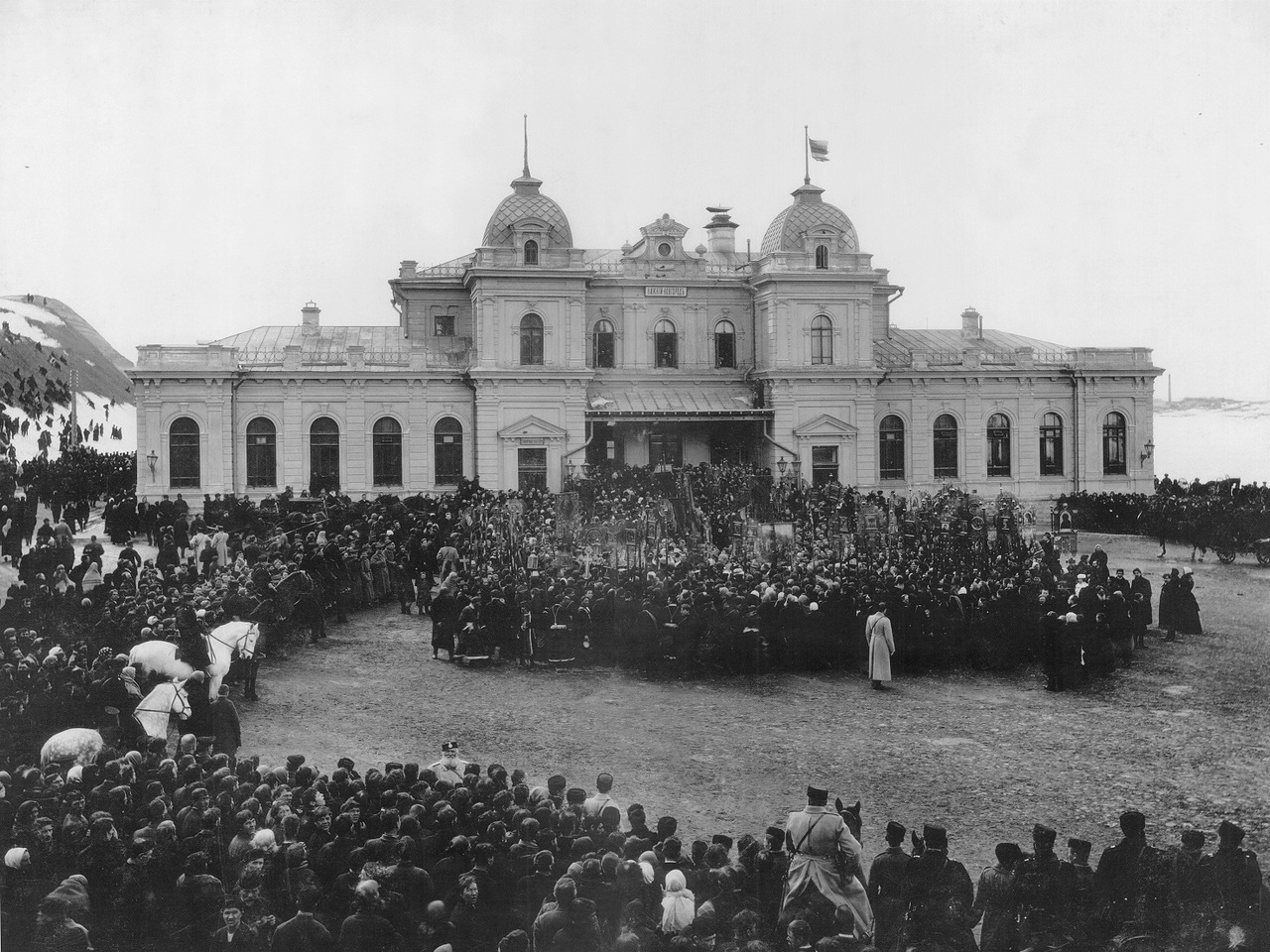
Departure of military units to the front. World War I. 1914 year.

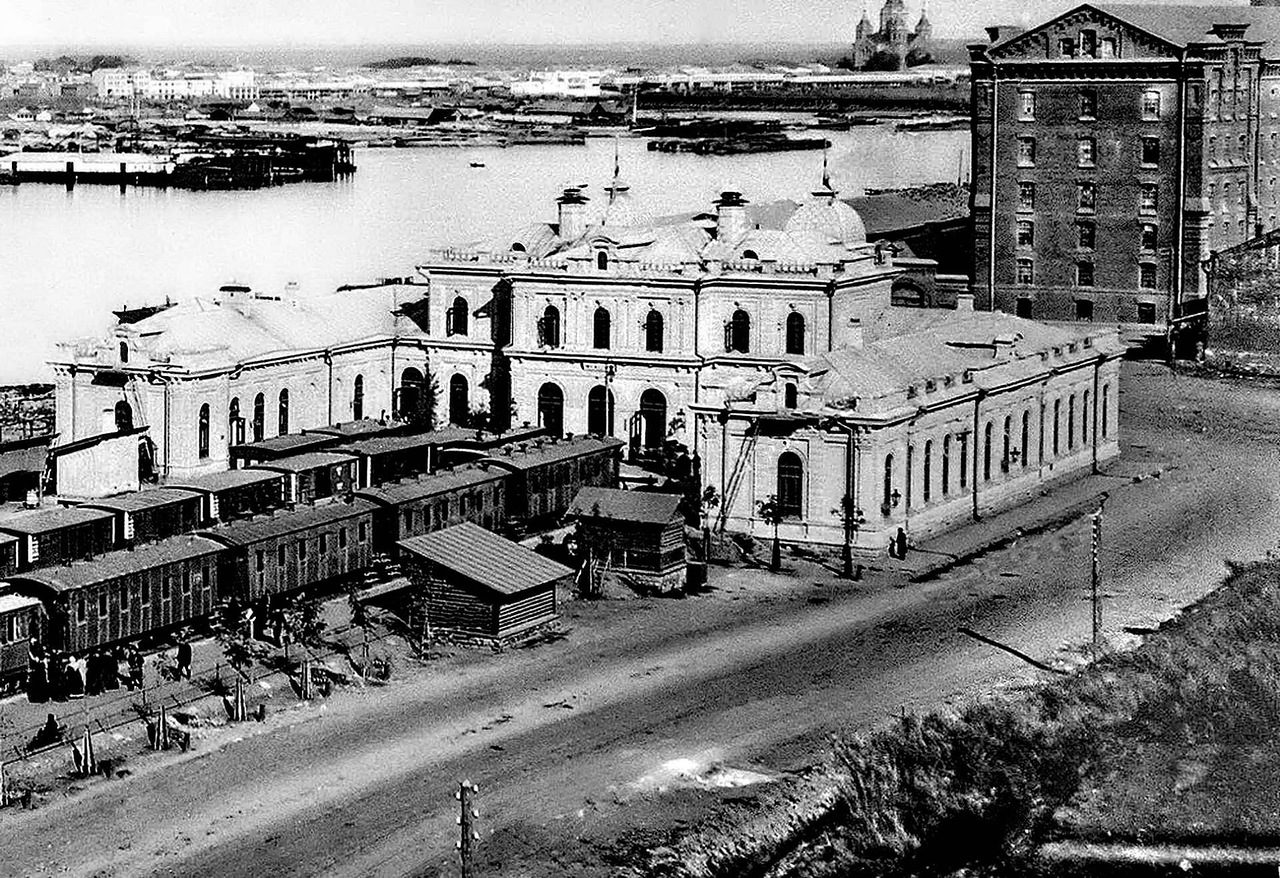
Trains at the terminal station of the Timiryazevo-Nizhny Novgorod railway line. Romodanovsky railway station

In 1896 the All-Russian Exhibition was held in Nizhny Novgorod. After the exhibition, a branch of the Technical Society was established in the city, which began to address the issue of connecting the city by rail. The company developed a project for the Nizhny Novgorod - Kazan railway. In order not to build a bridge across the Oka, it was decided to run the railroad tracks along the coastal terrace. The location for the station was chosen on the right bank of the Oka, near the pier of the Bashkirov flour mills. Also, the station was located across the Oka opposite the already existing Moskovsky railway station. The construction started in 1900 was completed in 1904. The construction was carried out by the Society of the Moscow-Kazan Railway. The construction was supervised by Grigory Budagov. The view of the railway station was captured by the photographer of the Russian Empire, Maxim Dmitriev.

Initially, the station was named after the village of Romodanovo in Mordovia. This is an anthroponym-name derived from the surname of the Romodanovsky princes, who were the owners of the village. In the 30s of the 20th century, the station was renamed twice. First to Arzamassky, then, in the middle of the 20th century, it was renamed to Kazansky, after trains began to go to Kazan.

Until 1945 the railway station belonged to the Moscow-Kazan railway, after which it was transferred to the jurisdiction of the Gorky railways.

The railroad tracks were located in dangerous mountainous areas, where landslides were a frequent hazard. To prevent these landslides, drainage adits were pierced. The work was done by hand, and the length of the deepest adit was 1.5 kilometers. These adits have survived to this day and are a popular research site for diggers (underground stalkers).

In 1961 the Sartakovsky railway bridge was built across the Oka, and long-distance trains began to run to the Moskovsky railway station. At the same time, the Kazansky railway station became a suburban station. Due to the lack of demand, several premises were given for the training of railway students.

In February 1974 several landslides occurred. One of them blocked the railway from the Myza station to the Kazansky railway station. This prompted officials to close the station. The railway track at the section from Myza station to Gorky-Kazansky station was dismantled, and the building gradually fell into decline. Students were the first to leave, followed by workers.

In 1993, the station building was included in the list of architectural monuments, but this did not lead to an improvement of the condition of the building. In 2003 the building was bought by the Novakard company who invested (circa) a million dollars to its restoration. The restoration work was supervised by Viktor Zubkov, based on photographs by Maxim Dmitriev and old drawings of the station. The dome of the building had to be redone three times to make it identical to the destroyed one. In the same year the company moved into the building of the former station. The authors of the reconstruction of the station were awarded a bronze diploma of the international festival Zodchestvo-2005.

== Gallery ==
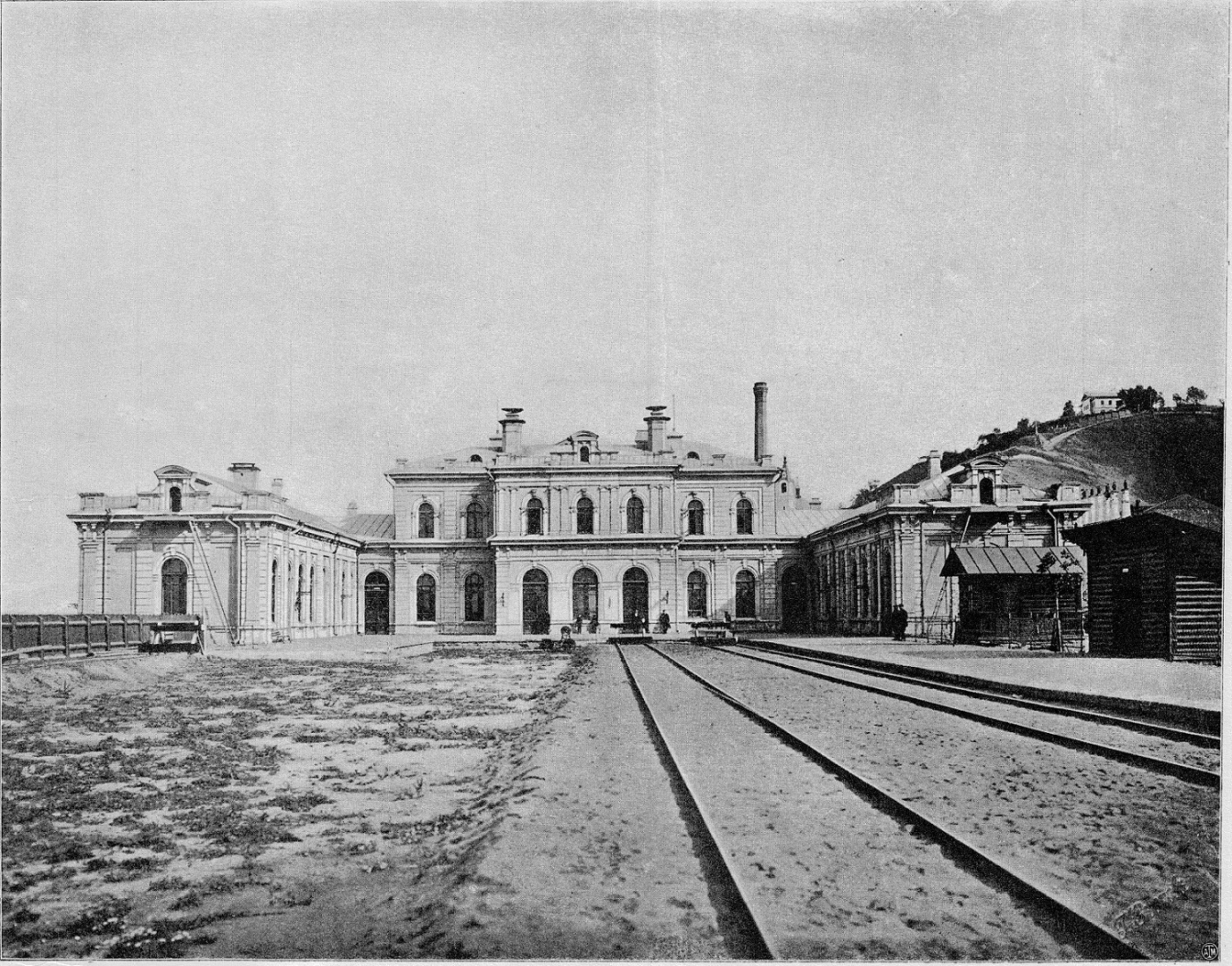
Railway tracks at the Romodanovsky station

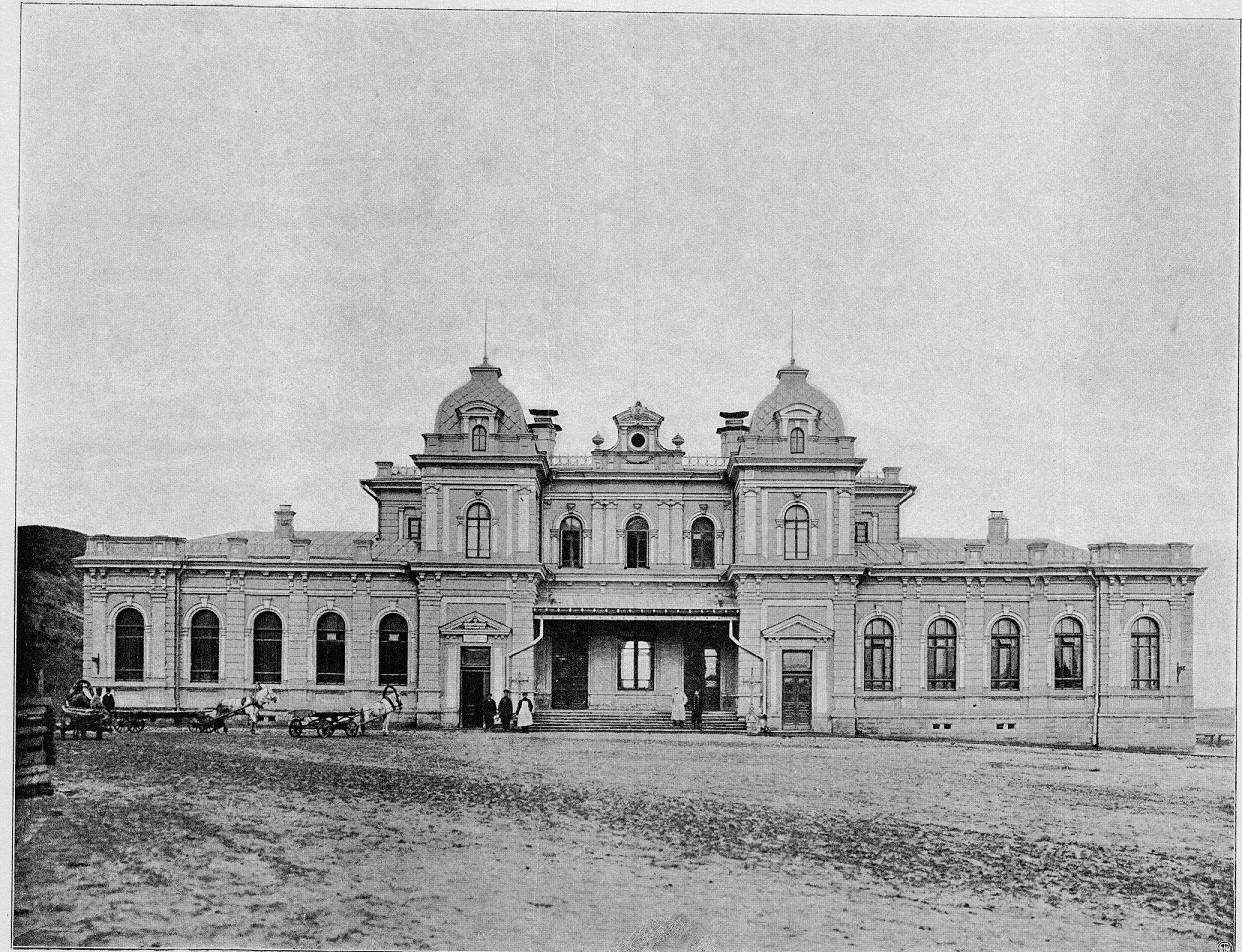
Railway station facade

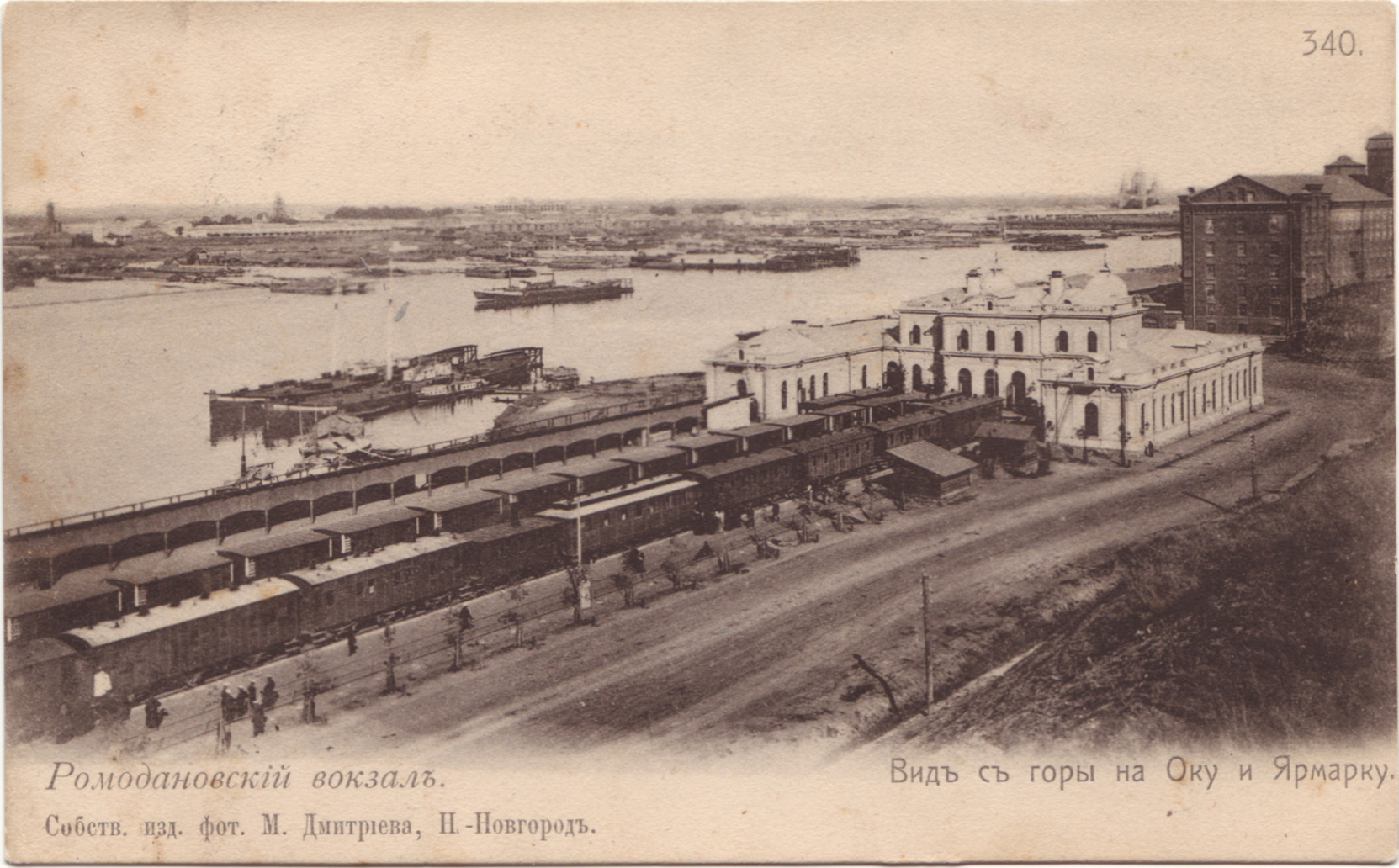
Trains at the Romodanovsky railway station

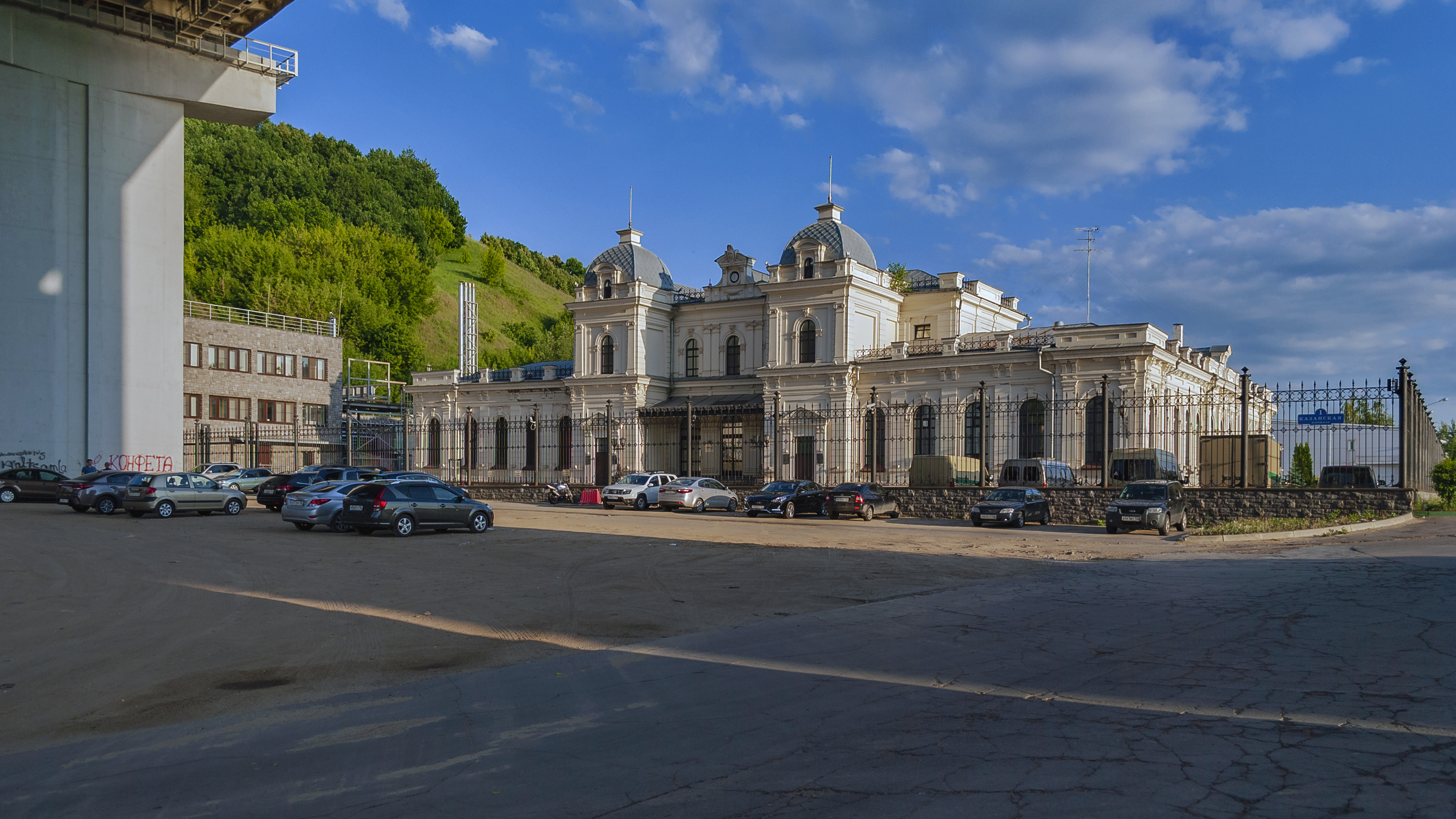
The current view of the former Kazansky railway station, converted into the office of the Novakard company
