= RUMO Plant =

Russian engine company

RUMO
- Native name: РУМО
- Type: Open joint-stock company
- Industry: Mechanical engineering
- Founded: 1874; 152 years ago Riga (evacuated to Nizhny Novgorod in 1915)
- Headquarters: Nizhny Novgorod, NIZ, Russia
- Key people: Vyacheslav Golanov (President & CEO of GAZ Group)
- Products: Diesel engines, gas engine
- Website: Official website

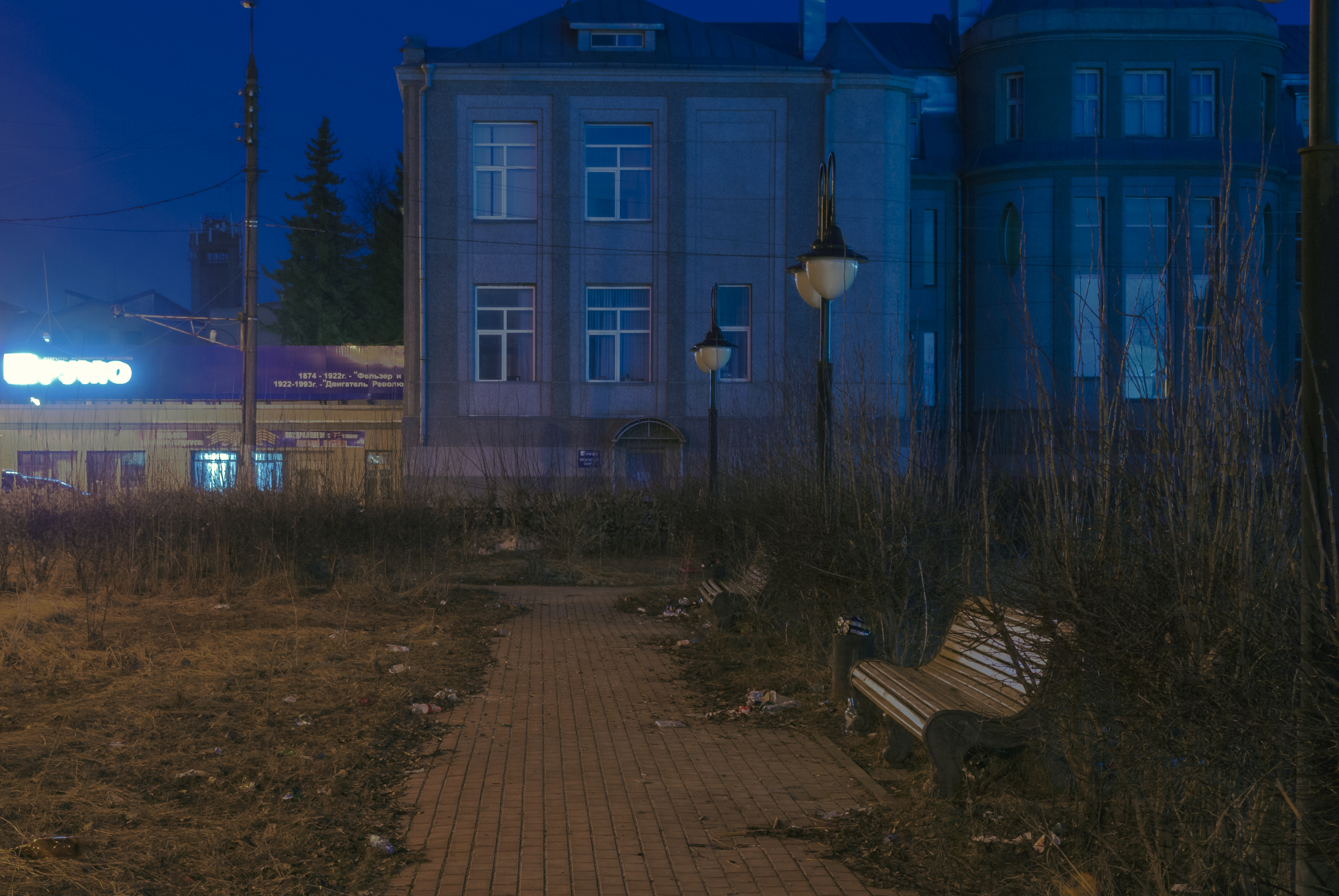
Main entrance and museum

RUMO Plant (Russian: РУМО, RUssian MOtors) is a company based in Nizhny Novgorod, Russia, and established in 1874.

The RUMO Diesel Plant manufactures large diesel engines for river cargo ship propulsion and diesel generator sets. It also manufactures reduction gears for cargo ships, integral-shaft diesel/gas compressors for pipeline boosting and for secondary oil extraction in petroleum fields, as well as metal products and household goods. Military orders were once 15 to 20 percent of total output, but have reportedly fallen to zero.
