= NITEL (Russian company) =

Company based in Nizhniy Novgorod, Russia

Coordinates: 56°15′13″N 43°58′01″E

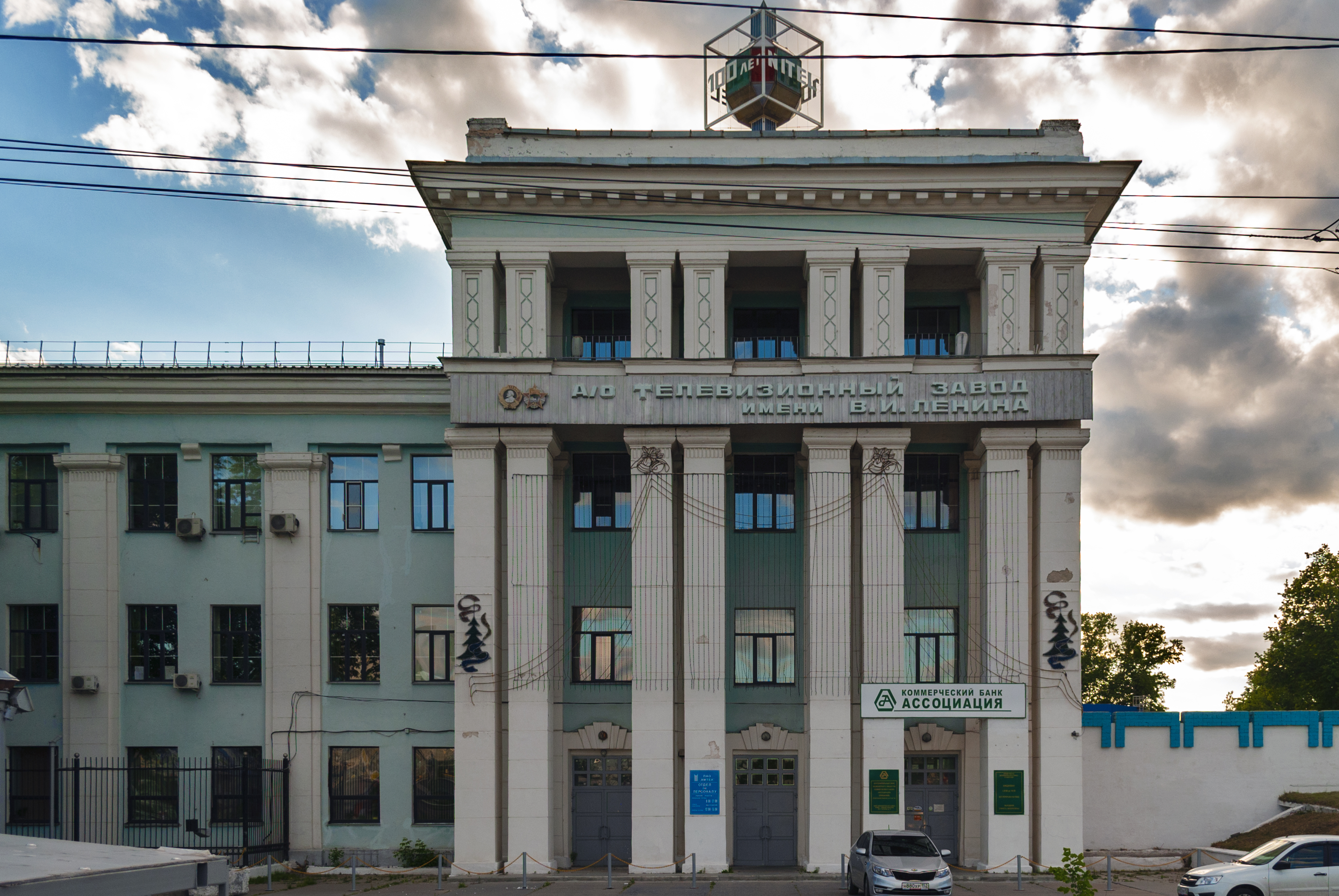
NITEL factory

Nitel Joint-Stock Company (Russian: ОАО «Нител») is a company based in Nizhniy Novgorod, Russia.

NITEL is among the world's leading producers of VHF air surveillance and surface-to-air missile target acquisition radars; its radars have counter-stealth features. Also a major manufacturer of television receivers, NITEL produces about 300,000 sets annually, 90 percent of which are color TVs. In the early 1990s, NITEL's civil production reportedly constituted 70 percent of its total output.
