= Dmitrievskaya Tower =

Coordinates: 56.327064°N 44.005697°E

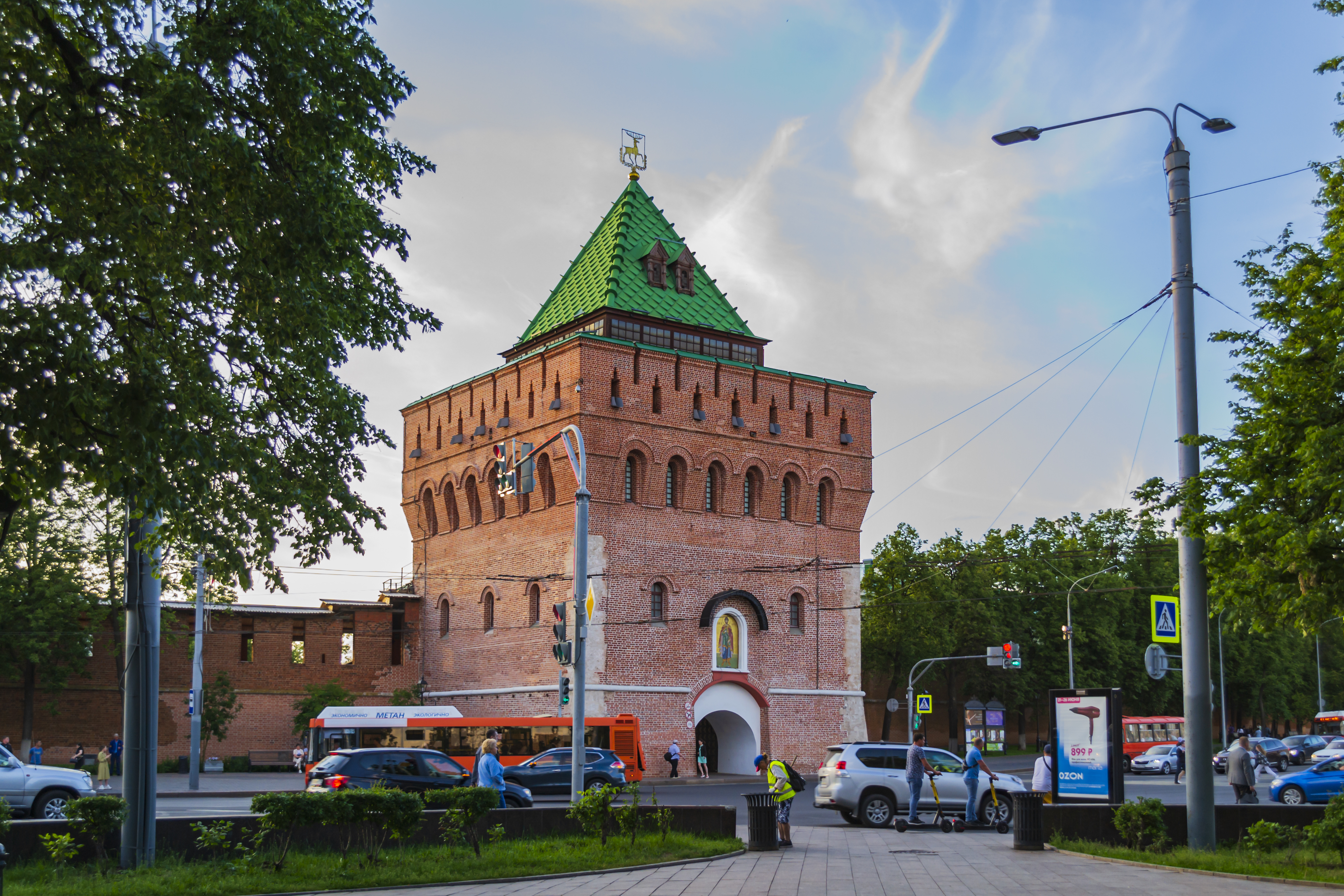
- The Dmitrievskaya Tower gleams in the mid-day sun.

General information
- Location: Nizhny Novgorod, Russia
- Height: 33 metres (108 ft)

Design and construction
- Architect(s): Nikolay Sultanov (1895 restoration)

The Dmitrievskaya Tower (Russian: Дмитриевская башня, romanized: Dmitrievskaya bashnya) is the main tower on the southern wall of the Nizhny Novgorod Kremlin which overlooks the Minin and Pozharsky Square. The tower named after a powerful Prince of Suzdal and Nizhny Novgorod Dmitry of Suzdal. Another version claims that the name gave a church which was sanctified of the name of Saint Demetrius of Thessaloniki. This church was located opposite the tower.

== History ==
The Dmitrievskaya Tower was built between 1500 and 1516 during the construction of the Nizhny Novgorod Kremlin. Its earliest mention comes in 1516 in the chronicle. After 1782 the Dmitrievskaya Tower began to disintegrate and redevelop. The Nizhny Novgorod Kremlin has been completely renovated between 1785 and 1790. Part of the tower above the gates was completely reconstructed. Wall thicknesses was reduced, loopholes were replaced by rectangular windows. Low slanting iron roof was erected. In the early 18th the Kremlin walls and the Dmitrievskaya Tower were traditionally painted white, in accordance with fashion. Height of the tower decreased by 6 m after back filling of a moat between 1834 and 1837 around the Kremlin. A garrison school for soldierly children occupied the tower at the end of the 18th century and the early the 19th century. The fortress become dilapidated meanwhile. Between 1958 and 1856 the tower was occupied by the provincial government's archival depository. Then the Dmitrievskaya Tower was abandoned.

In 1894-95 the tower was restored upon the project of architect Nikolai Sultanov. He was instructed to transform it into an art and historical museum. The upper level was completely rebuilt. Large windows were installed instead of straight teeth, decorating machicolations. Caravans were built up above the West-European-style. The museum was opened in 1896. At the opening ceremony of the museum, Emperor Nicholas II and his wife attended. In 1913 a big celebration was held in honor of the 300th anniversary of the Romanov family near the Dmitrievskaya Tower. The art and historical museum was located in the Dmitrievsky Tower until 1919. Then the exhibits and paintings were taken out and distributed to other places. Some of them were destroyed.

In 1994 the icon of Yuri II of Vladimir was restored above the gate (see picture below).

== Gallery ==
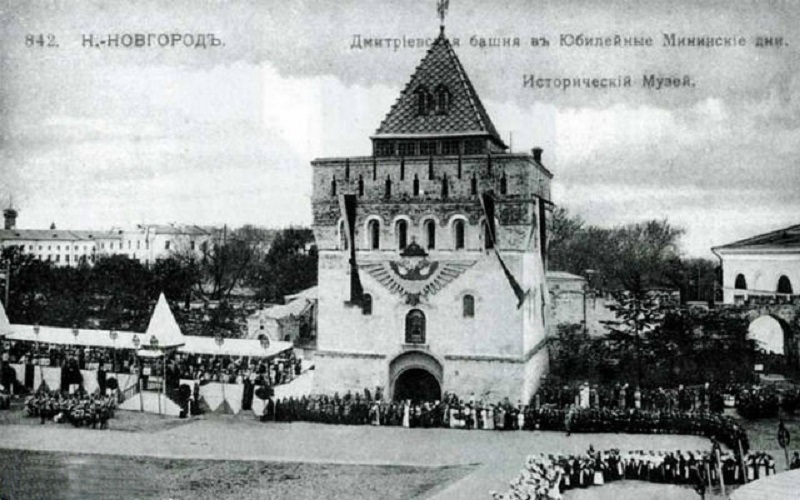
Dmitrievskaya Tower in 1913

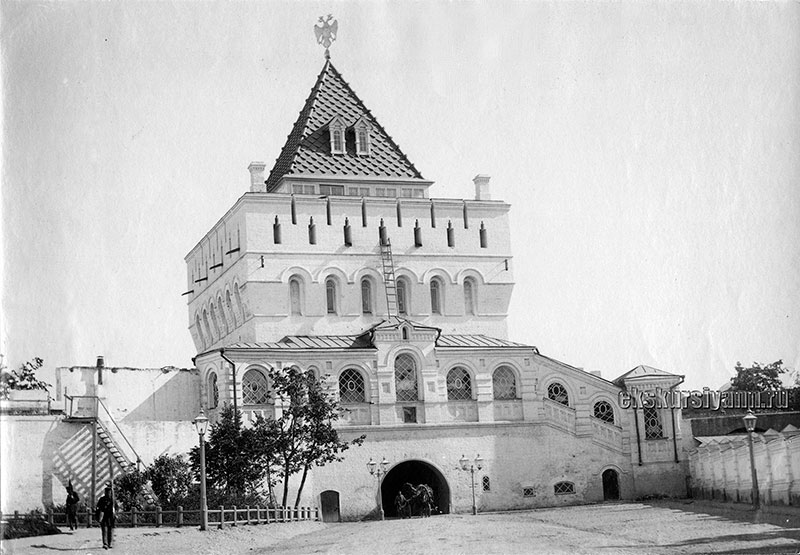
Dmitrievskaya Tower in 1895

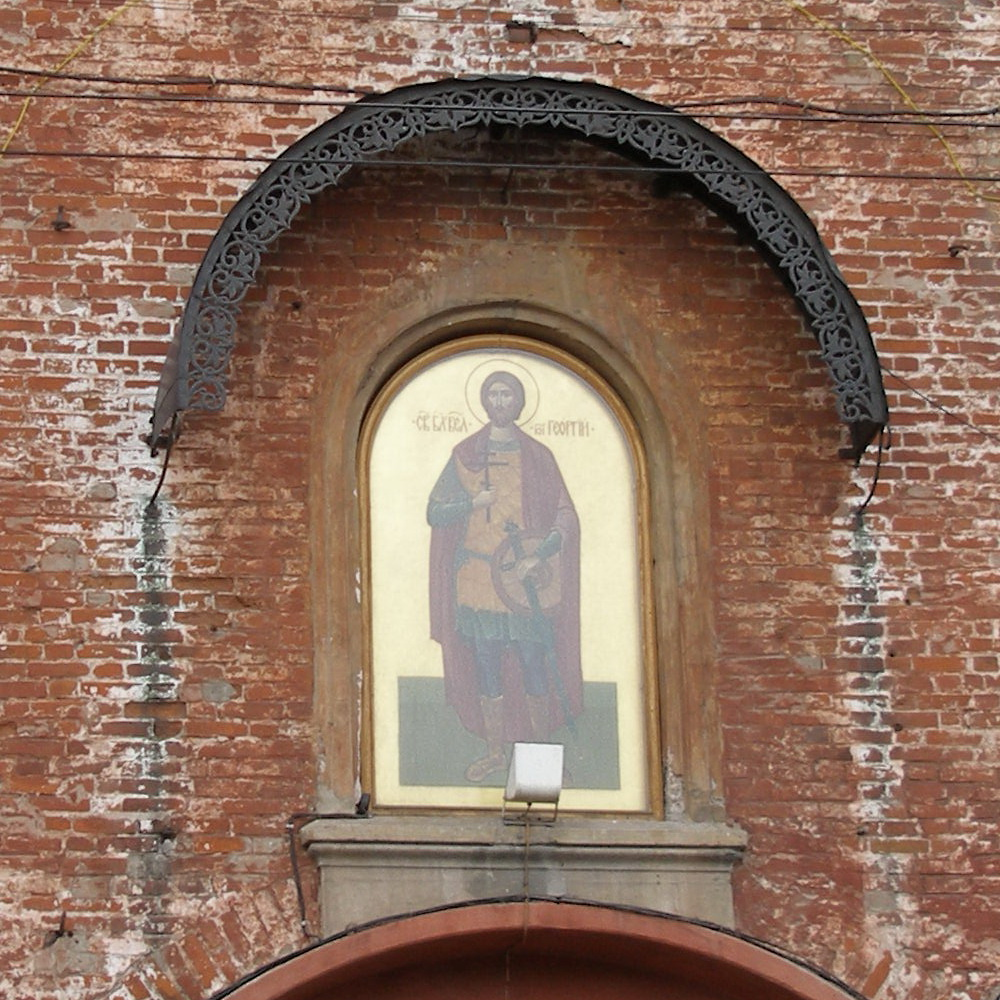
Icon of Yuri II of Vladimir

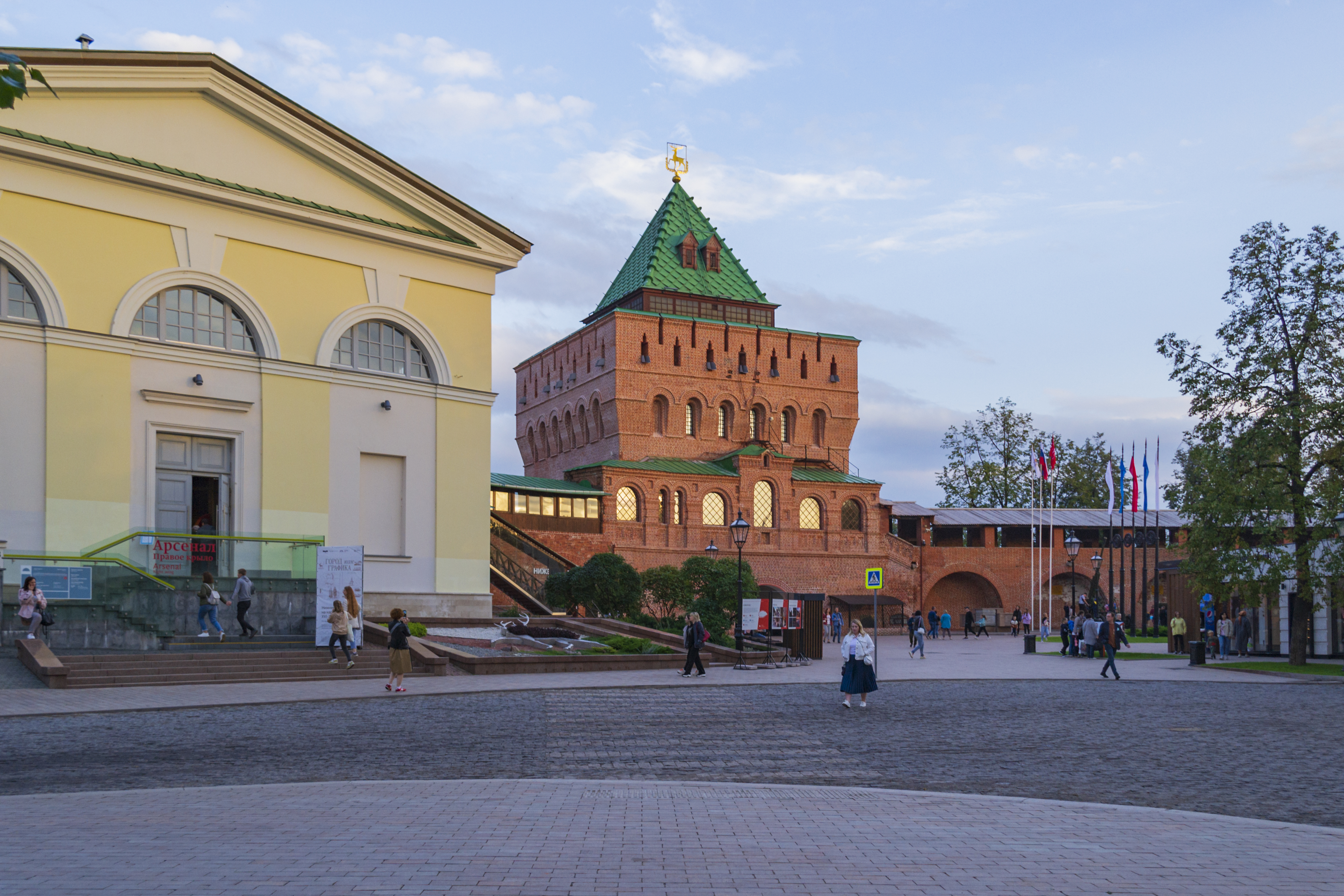
Dmitrievskaya Tower inside the Kremlin
