= Nizhny Novgorod Kremlin =

Fortress in Nizhny Novgorod, Russia

- Нижегородский кремль (Russian)
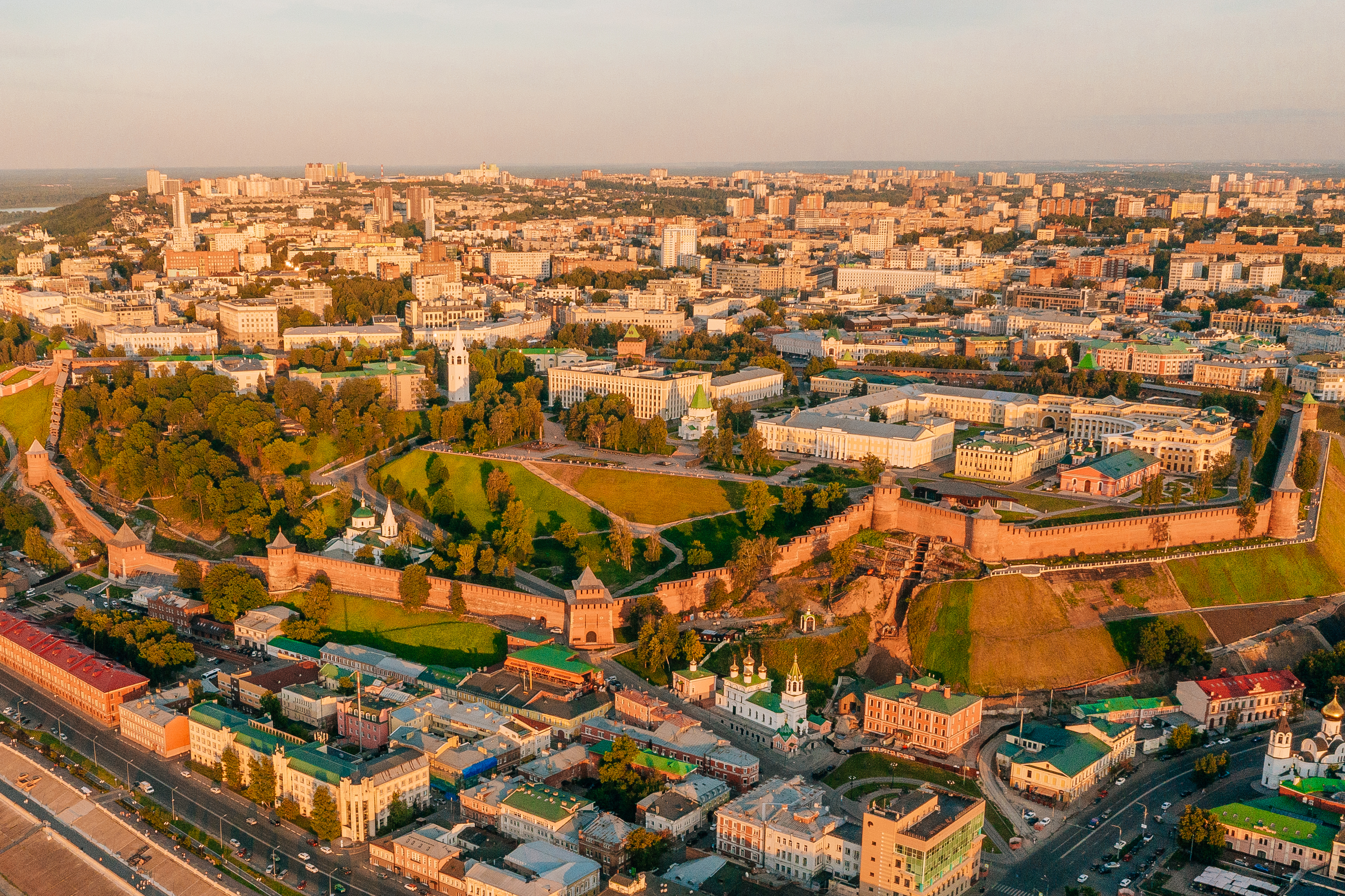
- View of Nizhny Novgorod Kremlin

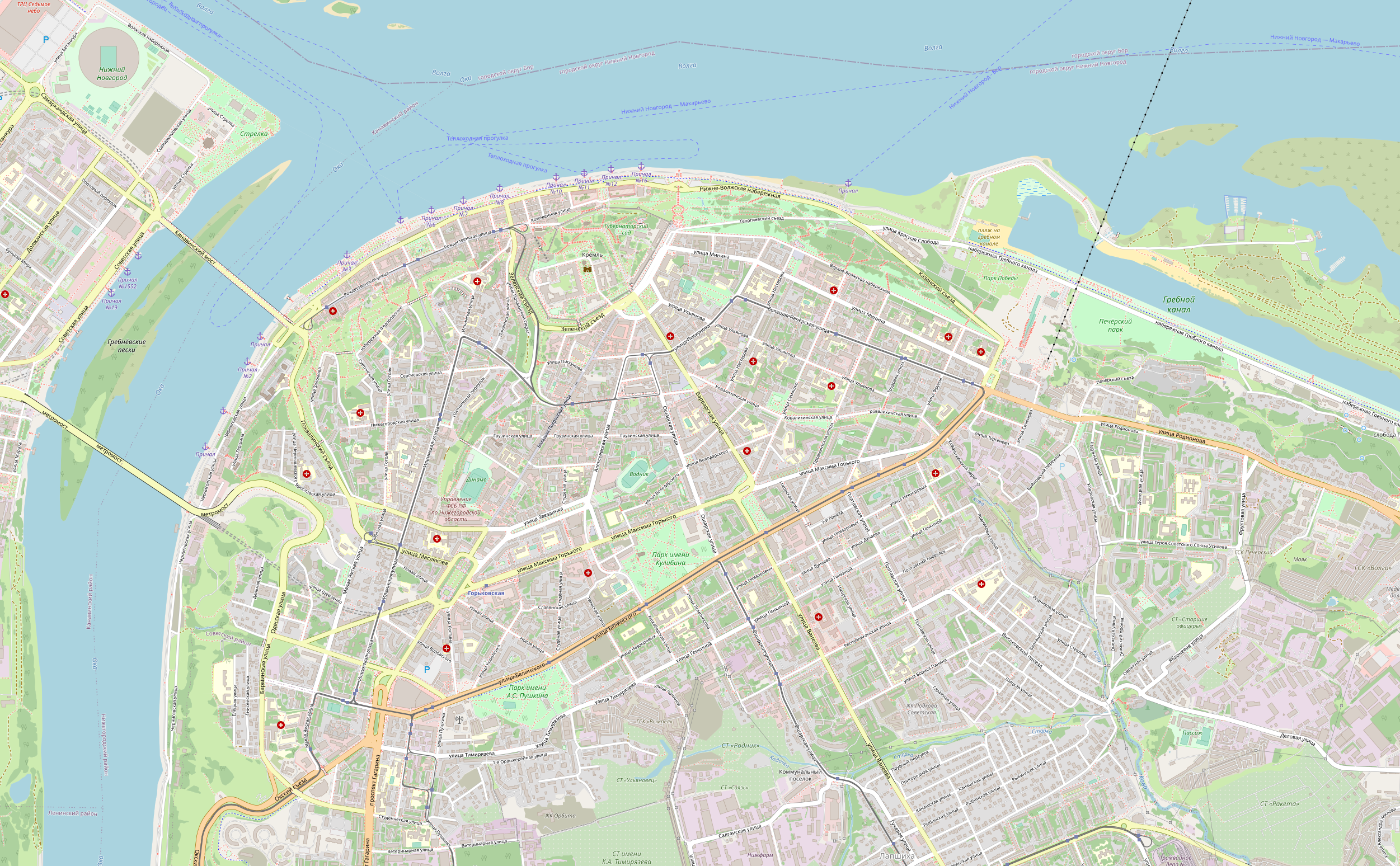
- Central Nizhny Novgorod
- 56°19′42.61″N 44°00′9.23″E
- Location: Nizhny Novgorod, Russia

History
- Built: 1508–1515

Site notes
- Area: 22.7 ha (0.227 km^{2})
- Architect: Pietro Francesco
- Governing body: kremlnn.ru
- Owner: Government of Nizhny Novgorod region

The Nizhny Novgorod Kremlin (Russian: Нижегородский кремль, romanized: Nizhegorodskiy kreml') is a fortress (kremlin) in the historic city center of Nizhny Novgorod, Russia.

== History ==
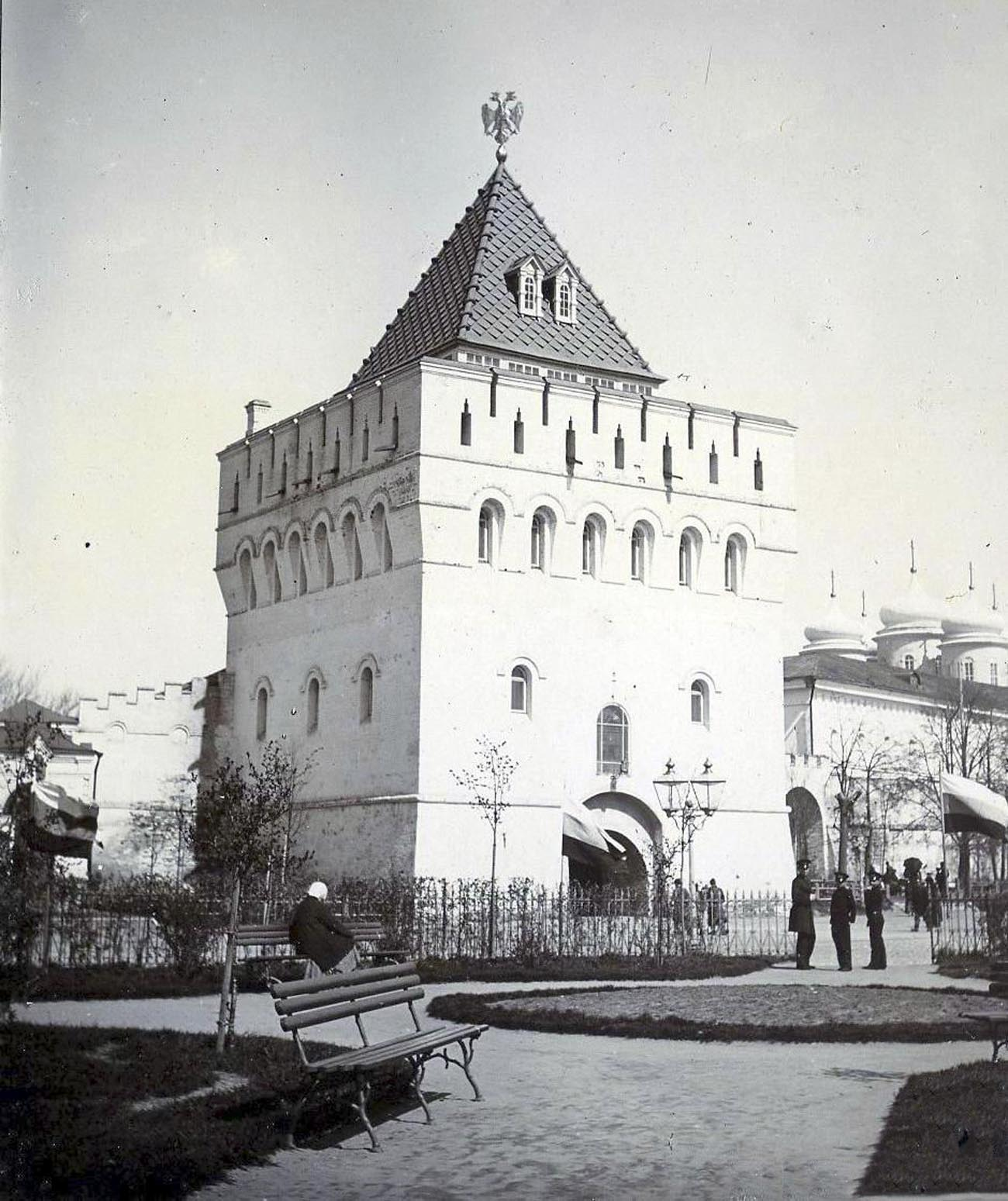
Dmitrievskaya Tower is the main tower of Nizhny Novgorod Kremlin. 1896

The first attempt to replace the wooden fort with a stone kremlin was recorded in 1374, but construction was limited to a single tower, known as the Dmitrovskaya Tower (this has not survived). Under the rule of Ivan III, Nizhny Novgorod played the role of a guard city, having a permanent garrison; it served as a place for gathering troops for Moscow’s actions against the Khanate of Kazan. In order to strengthen the defenses of the city, construction works on the walls began again.

Construction of the stone Kremlin of Nizhny Novgorod began in 1500 with the building of the Ivanovskaya Tower; the main work commenced in 1508 and by 1515 a building was completed. The oak walls that formed the old fortifications were destroyed by a huge fire in 1513. The two kilometer wall was reinforced by 13 towers (one of them – Zachatskaya – was on the shore of the Volga; not preserved, but was rebuilt in 2012). This “Stone City” had a permanent garrison with solid artillery weapons. With the fall of Kazan, Nizhny Novgorod Kremlin lost its military significance, and later it housed the city and provincial authorities.

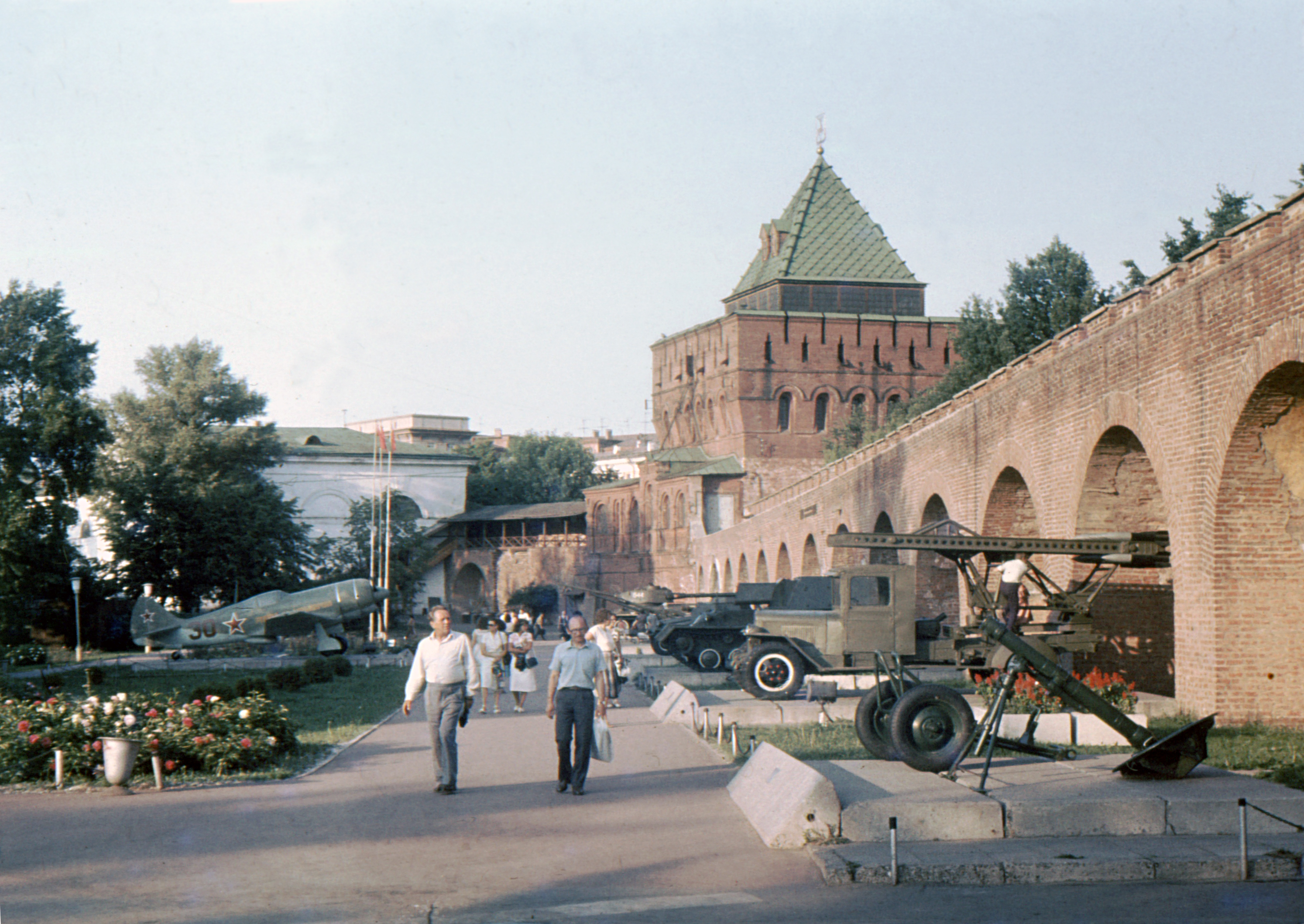
Memorial “Gorky for the front!” on the territory of the Kremlin between Dmitrovskaya and Kladovaya (Pantry) towers. 1986

During the World War II, the roofs of the Taynitskaya, the Severnaya, and the Chasovaya Towers were dismantled and anti-aircraft machine guns were installed on the upper platforms. Thus, the fortress defended the airspace of the city from the Luftwaffe. The Luftwaffe bombed the Kanavino bridge and the Fair, but the Kremlin's air defense defended these objects.

The Council of Ministers of the RSFSR issued an order on January 30, 1949 for the restoration of the Nizhny Novgorod Kremlin.

In October 2018, archaeologists discovered the remains of a medieval settlement and cemetery on the site of the destroyed church of St. Simeon Stylites. The finds belong to the 13th century, and the most ancient cultural layer - to 1221, when Nizhny Novgorod was founded.

In 2021, before the 800th anniversary of Nizhny Novgorod, a major restoration was carried out. Under its terms, the most important thing was the restoration of the historic "battle road" inside the Kremlin wall. The city had been waiting for this event for 230 years. Since August 2021, locals and tourists can walk a full circular route along the large fortress wall while inside it. Its length is 2 km.

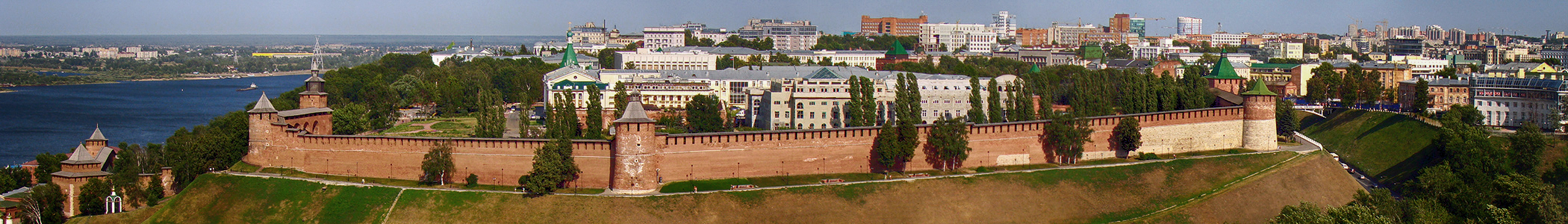

== Towers ==
The following 13 towers survive. Counter clockwise:

Towers of Nizhny Novgorod Kremlin

1. Georgievskaya Tower (Russian: Георгиевская башня, lit. 'St. George Tower')
2. Borisoglebskaya Tower (Russian: Борисоглебская башня, lit. 'Tower of Ss. Boris and Gleb'; destroyed by a landslide in the 18th century, rebuilt in 1972)
3. Zachatskaya Tower (Russian: Зачатская башня, lit. 'Conteption Tower'; destroyed by a landslide in the 18th century, rebuilt in 2012)
4. Belaya Tower (Russian: Белая башня, lit. 'White Tower')
5. Ivanovskaya Tower (Russian: Ивановская башня, lit. 'St. John's Tower')
6. Chasovaya Tower (Russian: Часовая башня, lit. 'Clock Tower')
7. Severnaya Tower (Russian: Северная башня, lit. 'Northern Tower')
8. Taynitskaya Tower (Russian: Тайницкая башня, lit. 'Secret Tower')
9. Koromyslova Tower (Russian: Коромыслова башня, lit. 'Yoke Tower')
10. Nikolskaya Tower (Russian: Никольская башня, lit. 'St. Nicholas Tower')
11. Kladovaya Tower (Russian: Кладовая башня, lit. 'Pantry Tower')
12. Dmitrievskaya Tower (Russian: Дмитриевская башня, lit. 'St. Demetrius Tower')
13. Porokhovaya Tower (Russian: Пороховая башня, lit. 'Powder Tower')
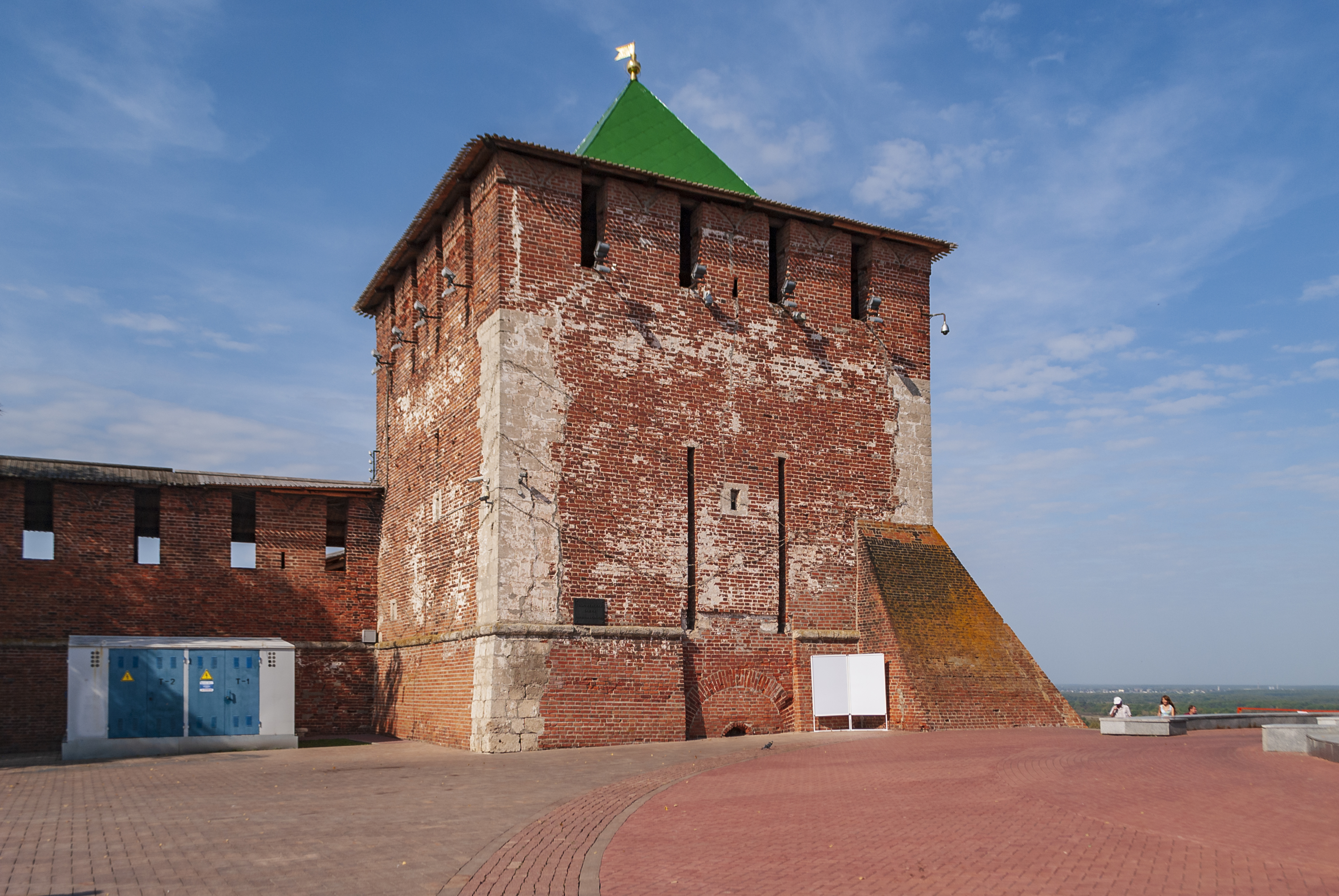
Georgievskaya Tower
St. George Tower
Георгиевская

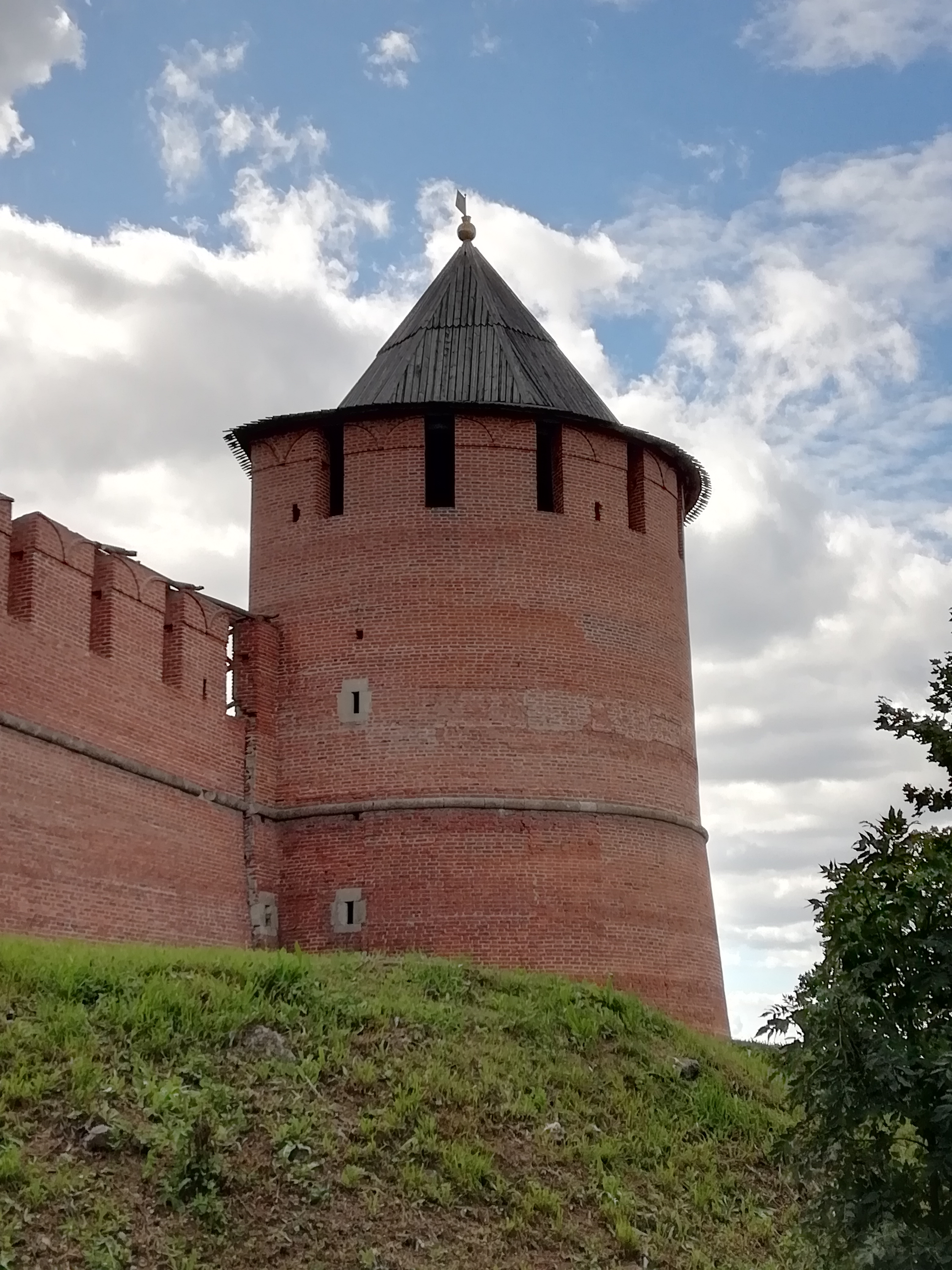
Borisoglebskaya Tower
Tower of Ss. Boris and Gleb
Борисоглебская

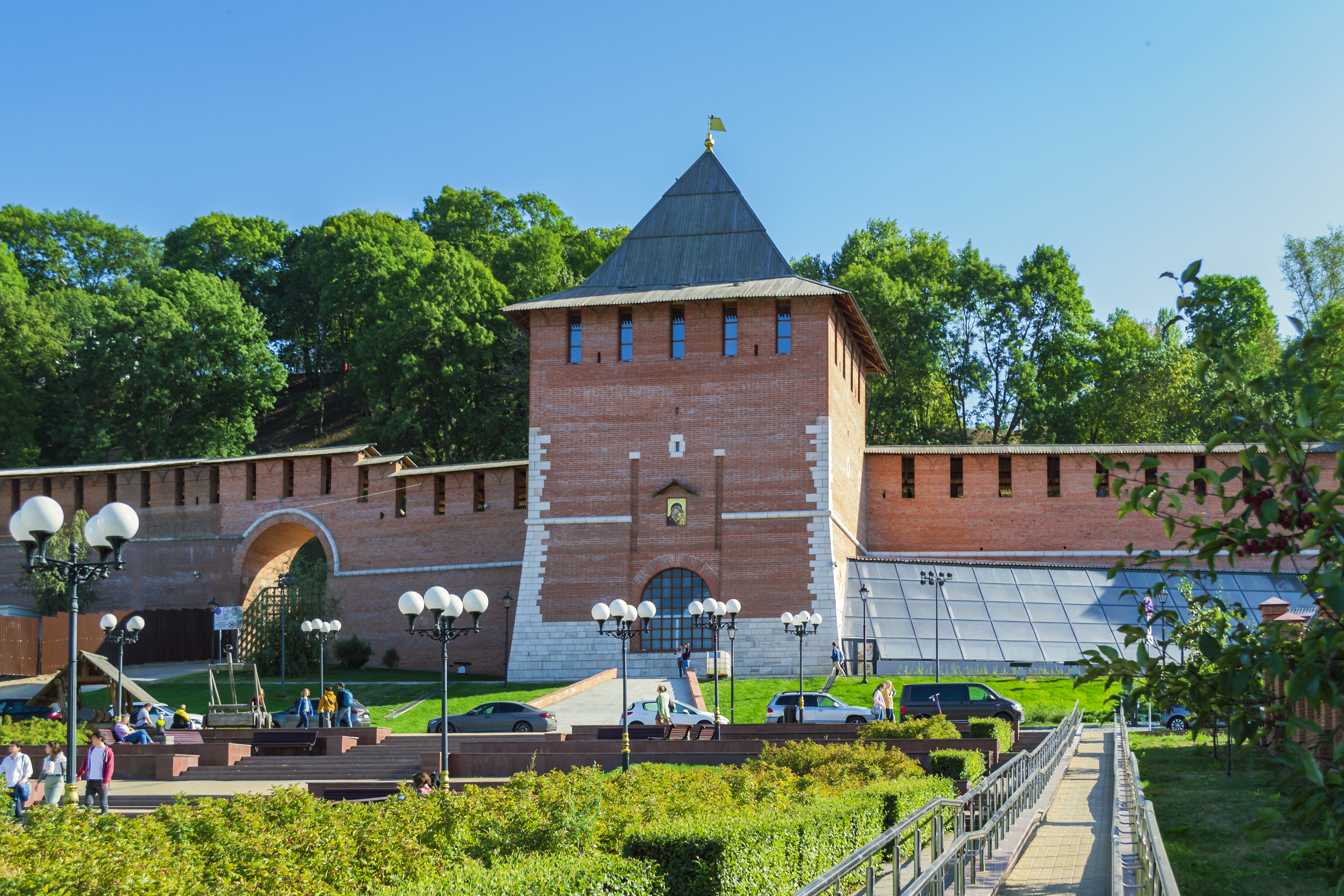
Zachatskaya Tower
Conception Tower
Зачатская

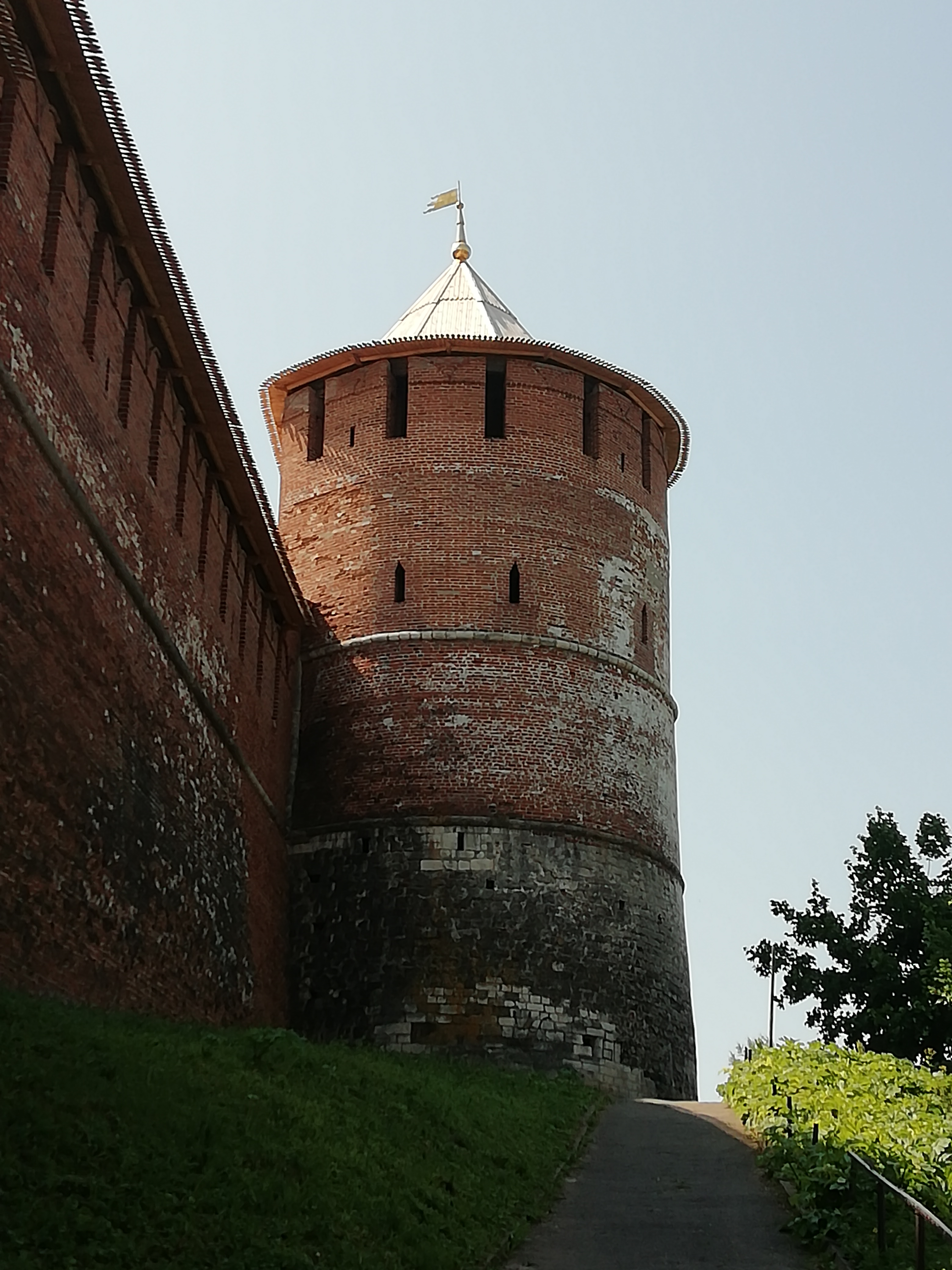
Belaya Tower
White Tower
Белая

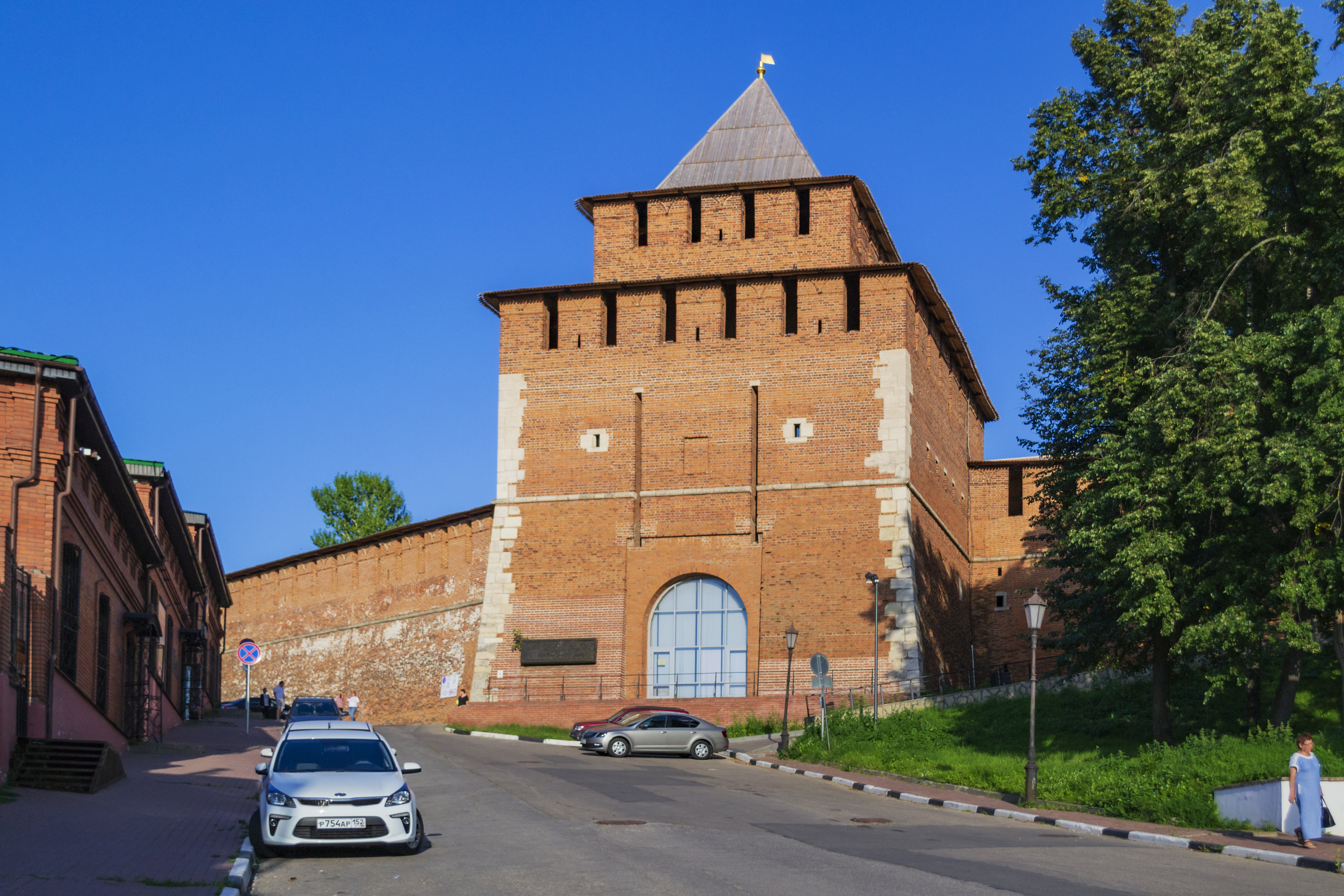
Ivanovskaya Tower
St. John Tower
Ивановская

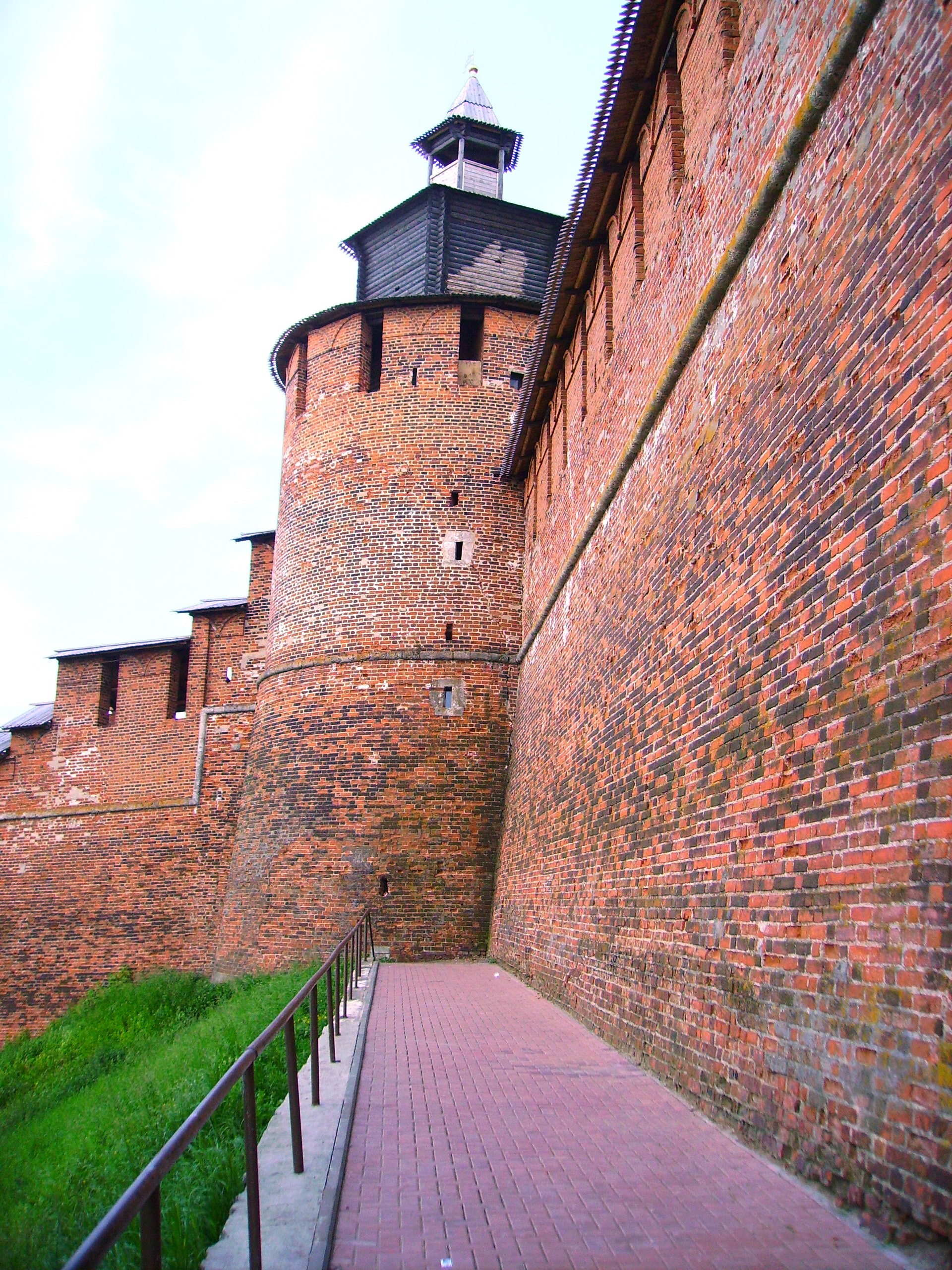
Chasovaya Tower
Clock Tower
Часовая

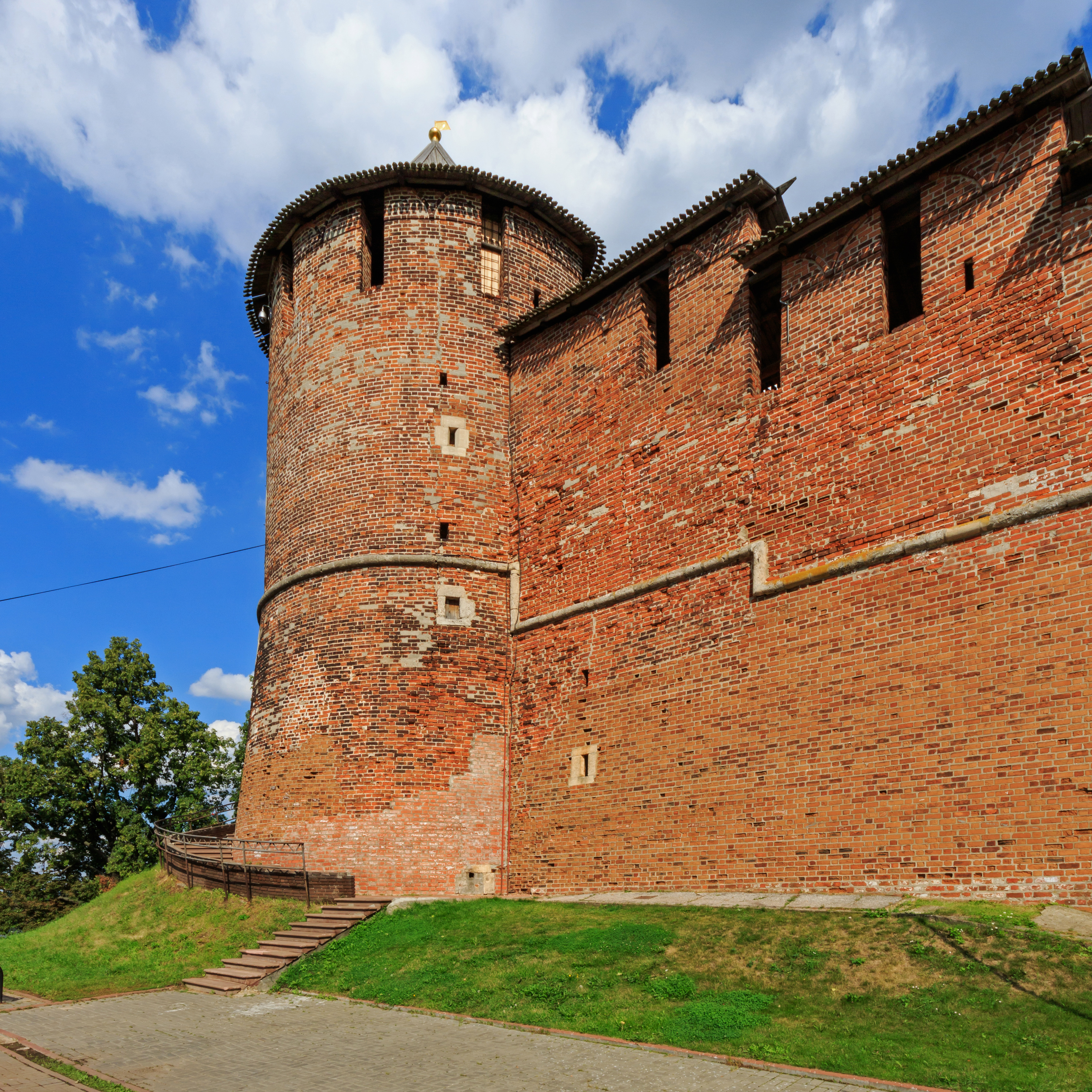
Severnaya Tower
Northern Tower
Северная

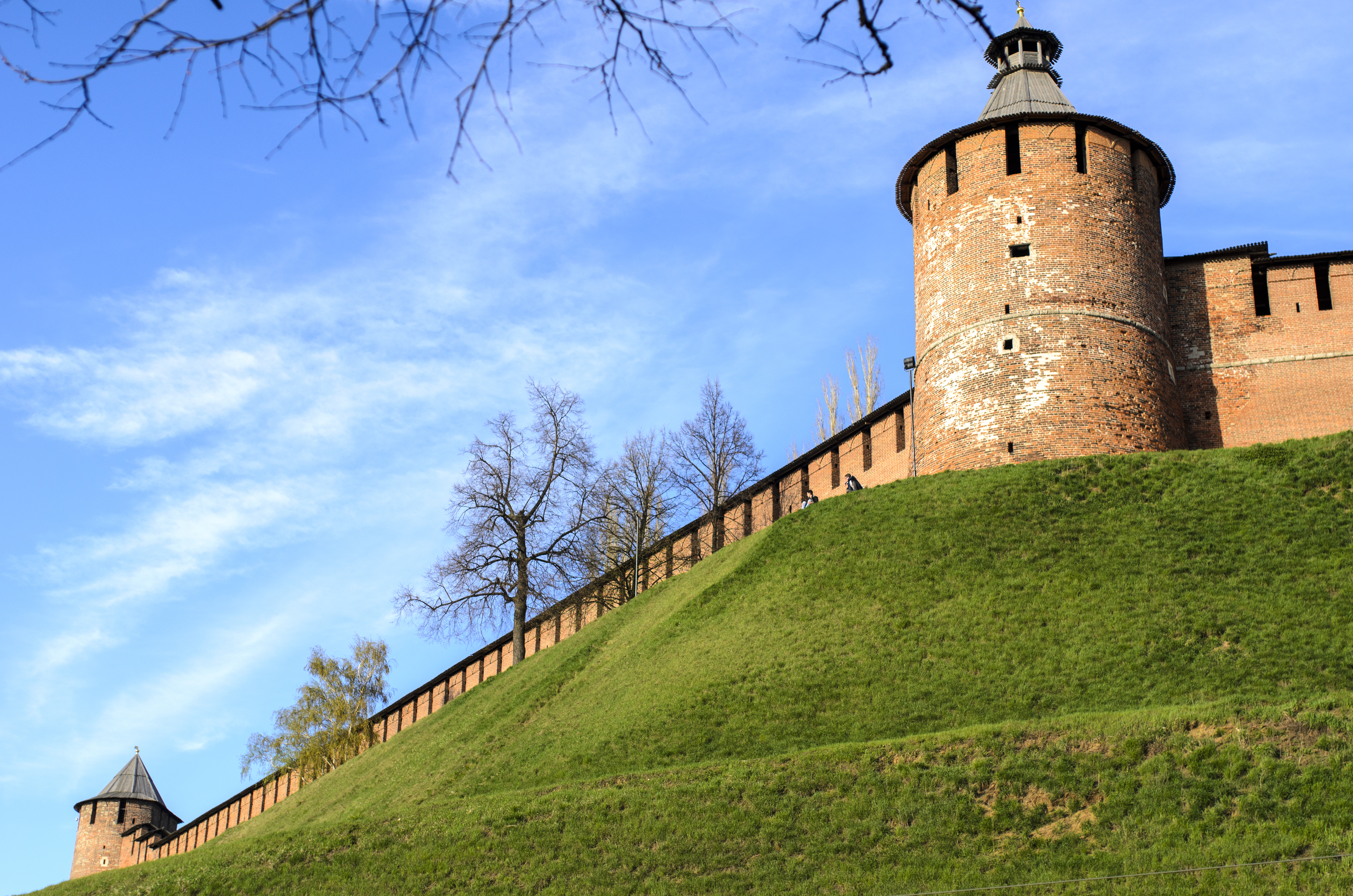
Taynitskaya Tower
Secret Tower
Тайницкая

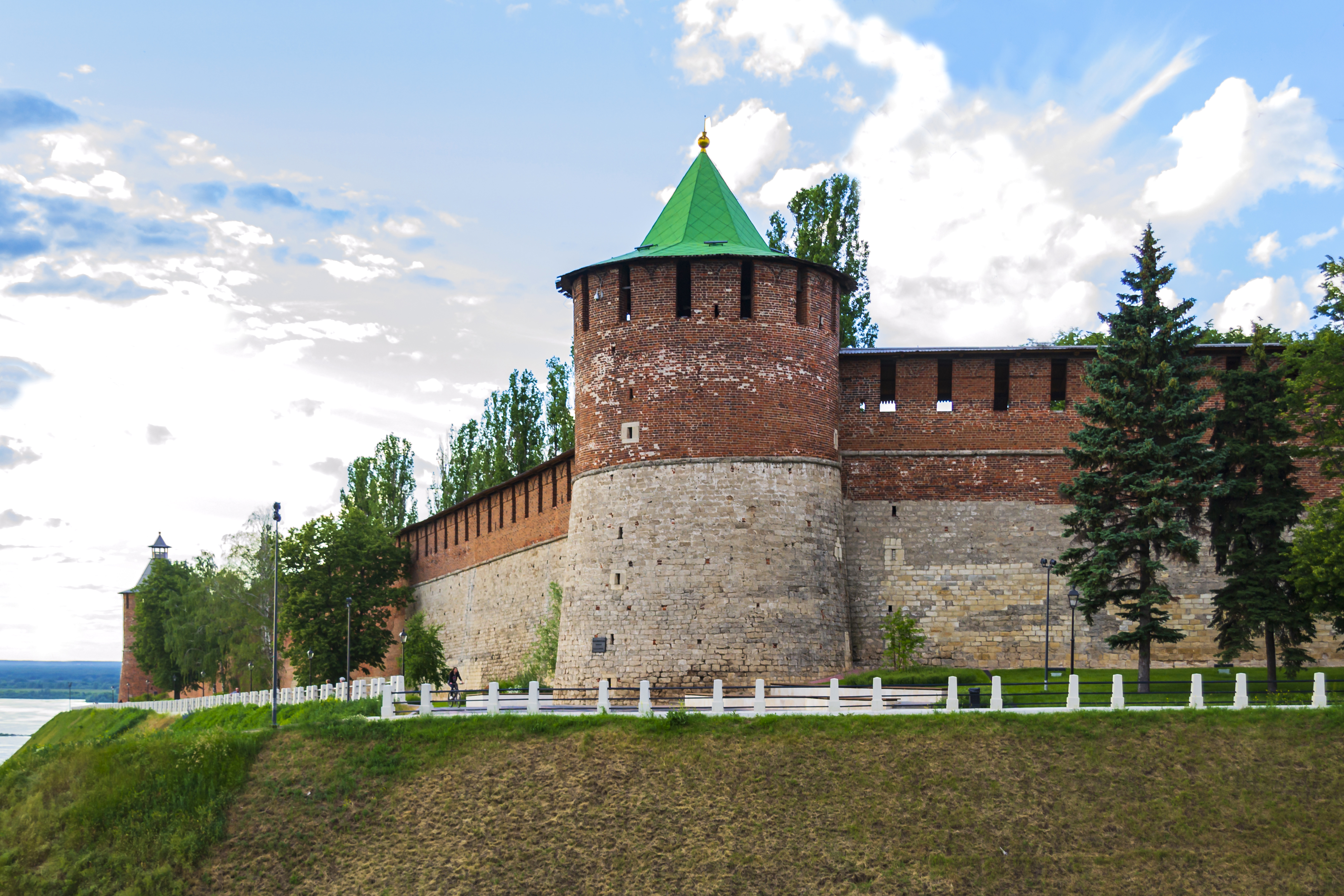
Koromyslova Tower
Yoke Tower
Коромыслова

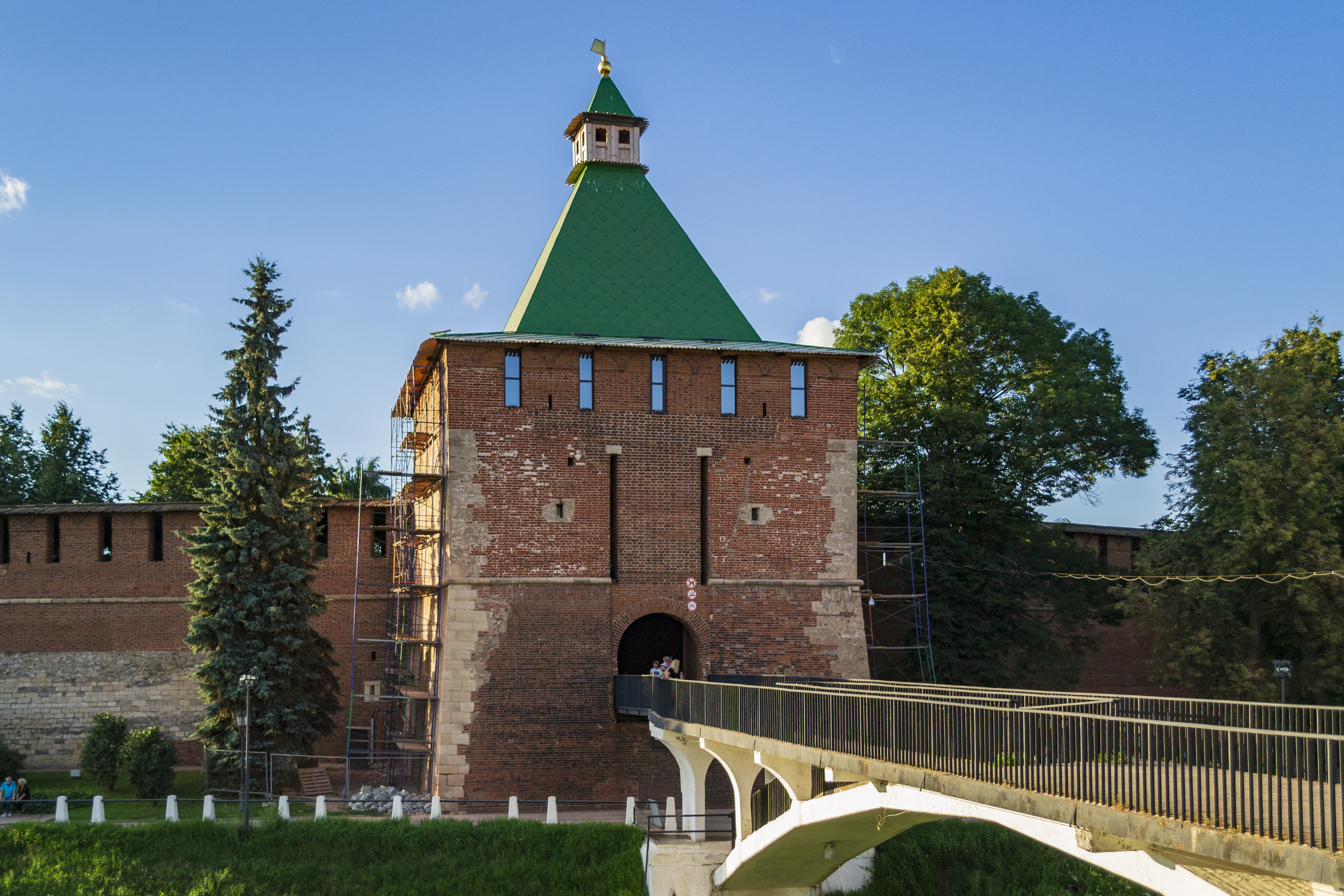
Nikolskaya Tower
St. Nicholas Tower
Никольская

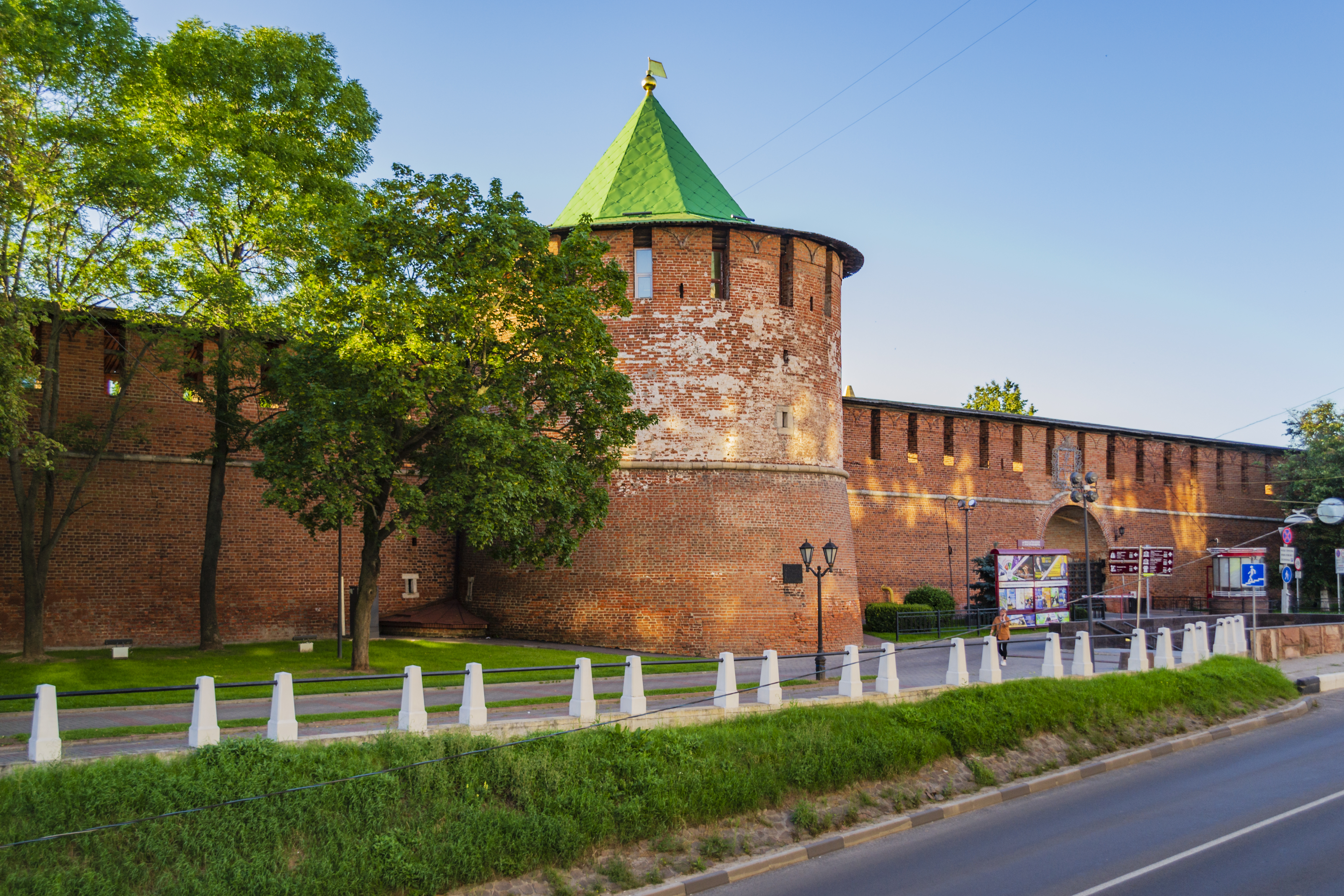
Kladovaya Tower
Pantry Tower
Кладовая

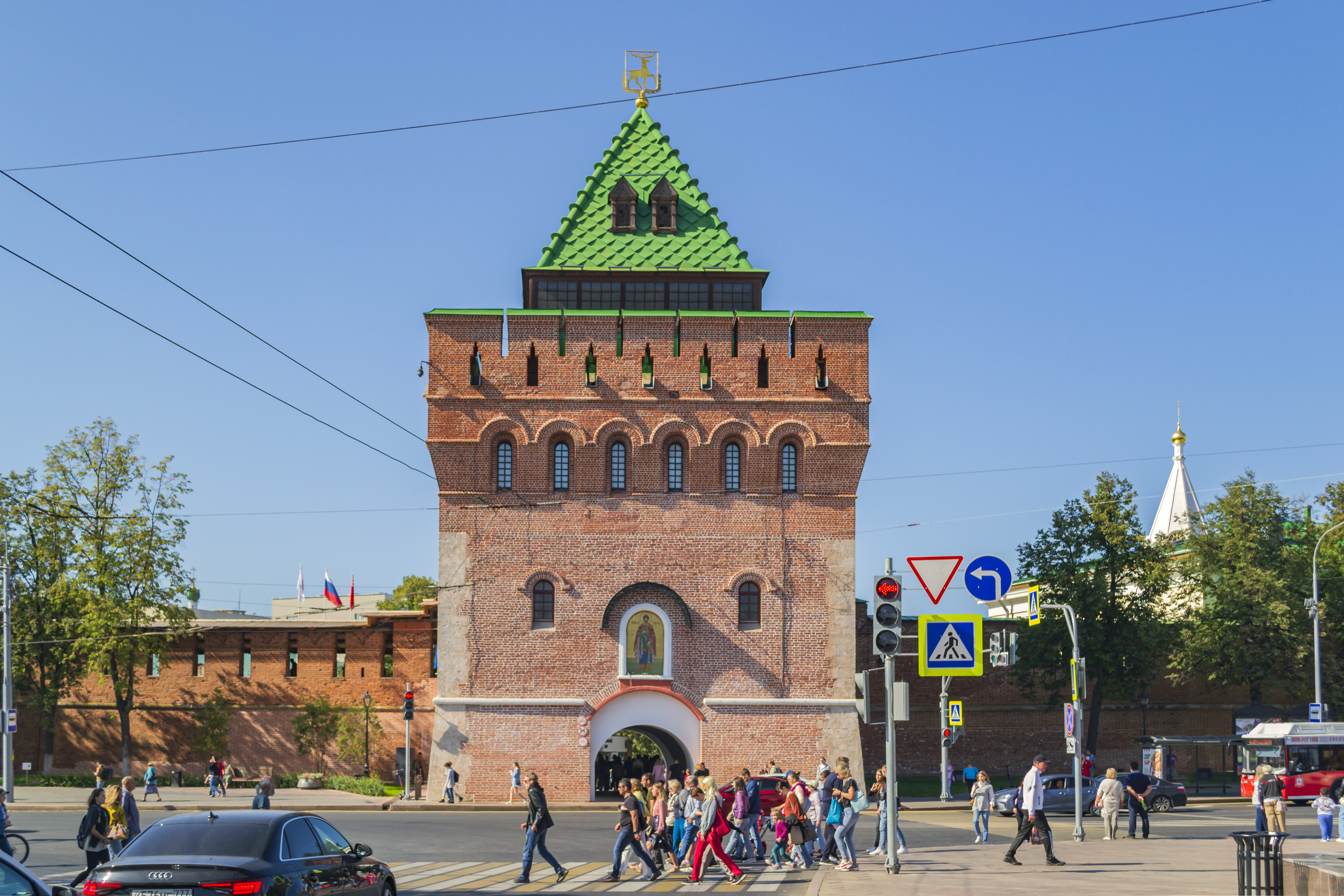
Dmitrovskaya Tower
St. Demetrius Tower
Дмитровская

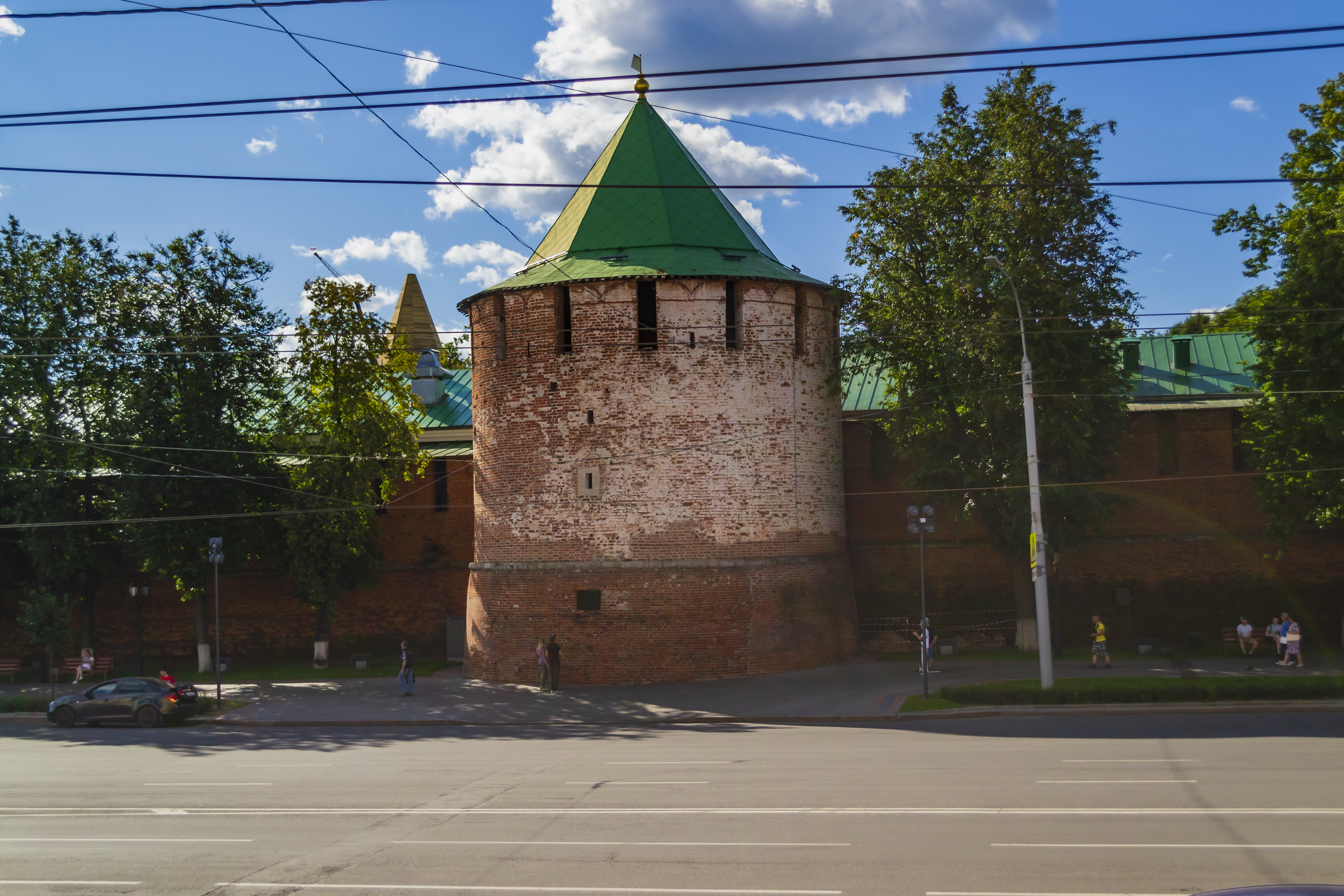
Porokhovaya Tower
Powder Tower
Пороховая

== Other buildings and constructions ==
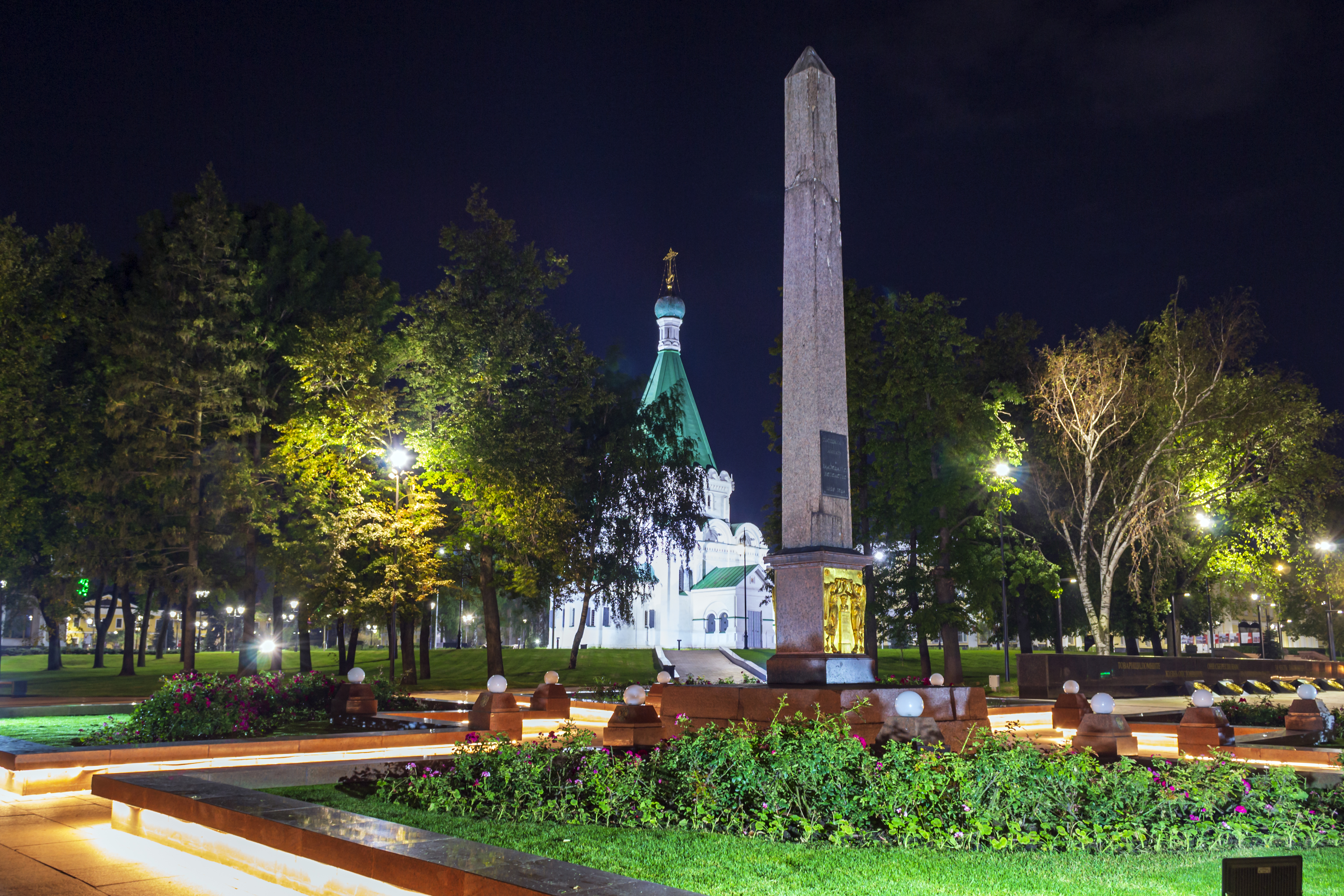
Obelisk of Minin and Pozharsky and St. Michael Archangel Cathedral

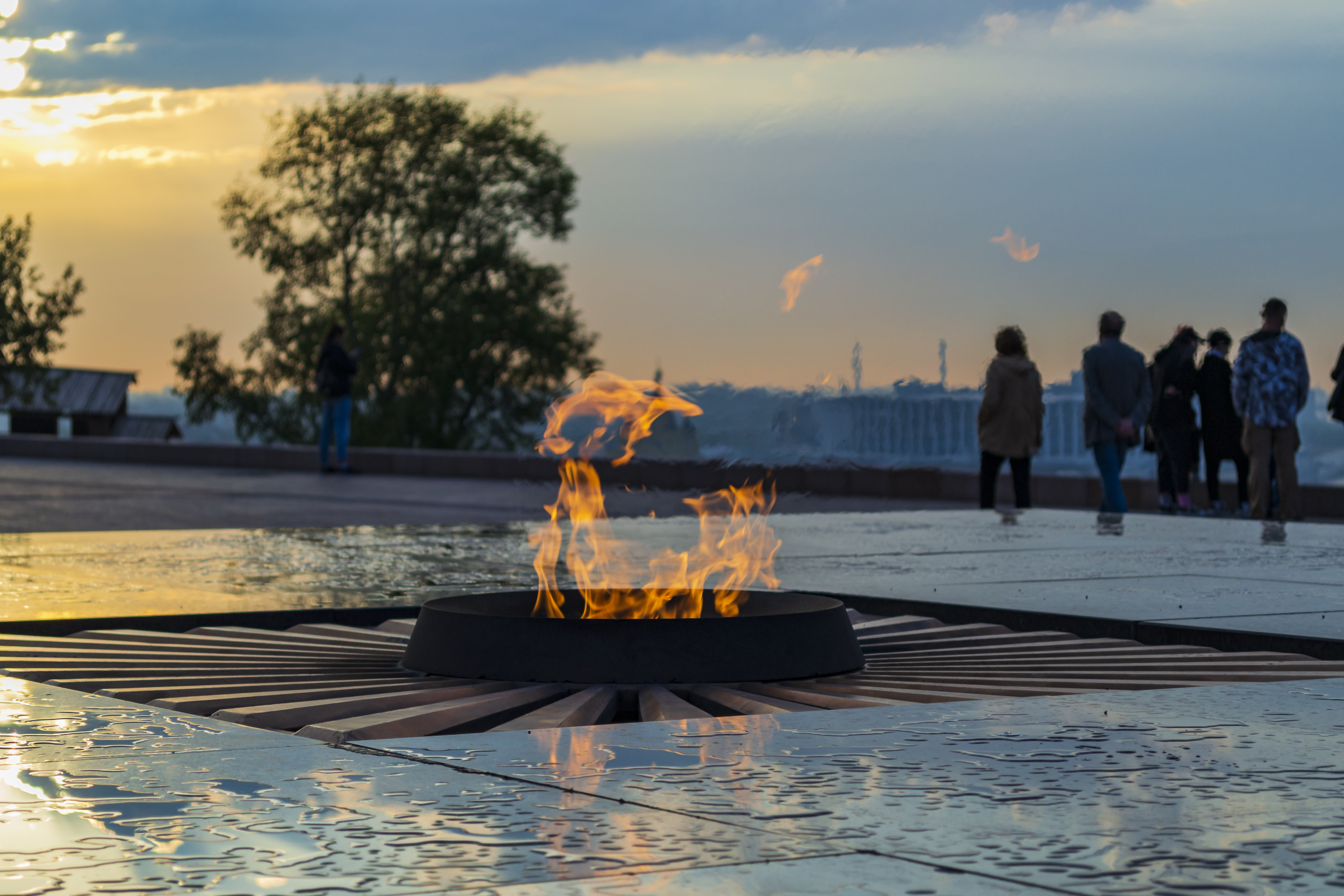
Eternal Flame

The Kremlin contained many churches, but the only survivor is the Michael the Archangel Cathedral (the 'Archangel Cathedral'), built no later than the middle of the 16th century and rebuilt in 1628-1631. It is the oldest surviving building in the Kremlin. The cathedral contains the tomb of Kuzma Minin. In 1828, an obelisk in honor of Kuzma Minin and Dmitry Pozharsky was constructed in front of the Archangel Cathedral (architect Melnikov and Martos).

The house of the military governor was built in 1837-1841; it is now the Museum of Art. The Arsenal was built in 1840-1843 at the direction of Nicholas I. In 1931, the Transfiguration Cathedral was replaced by the House of Soviets; that building is now the City Council building.

In 1965, a memorial complex in honor of Nizhny Novgorod citizens who died in World War II was created, near the obelisk of Minin and Pozharsky; this included an eternal flame.

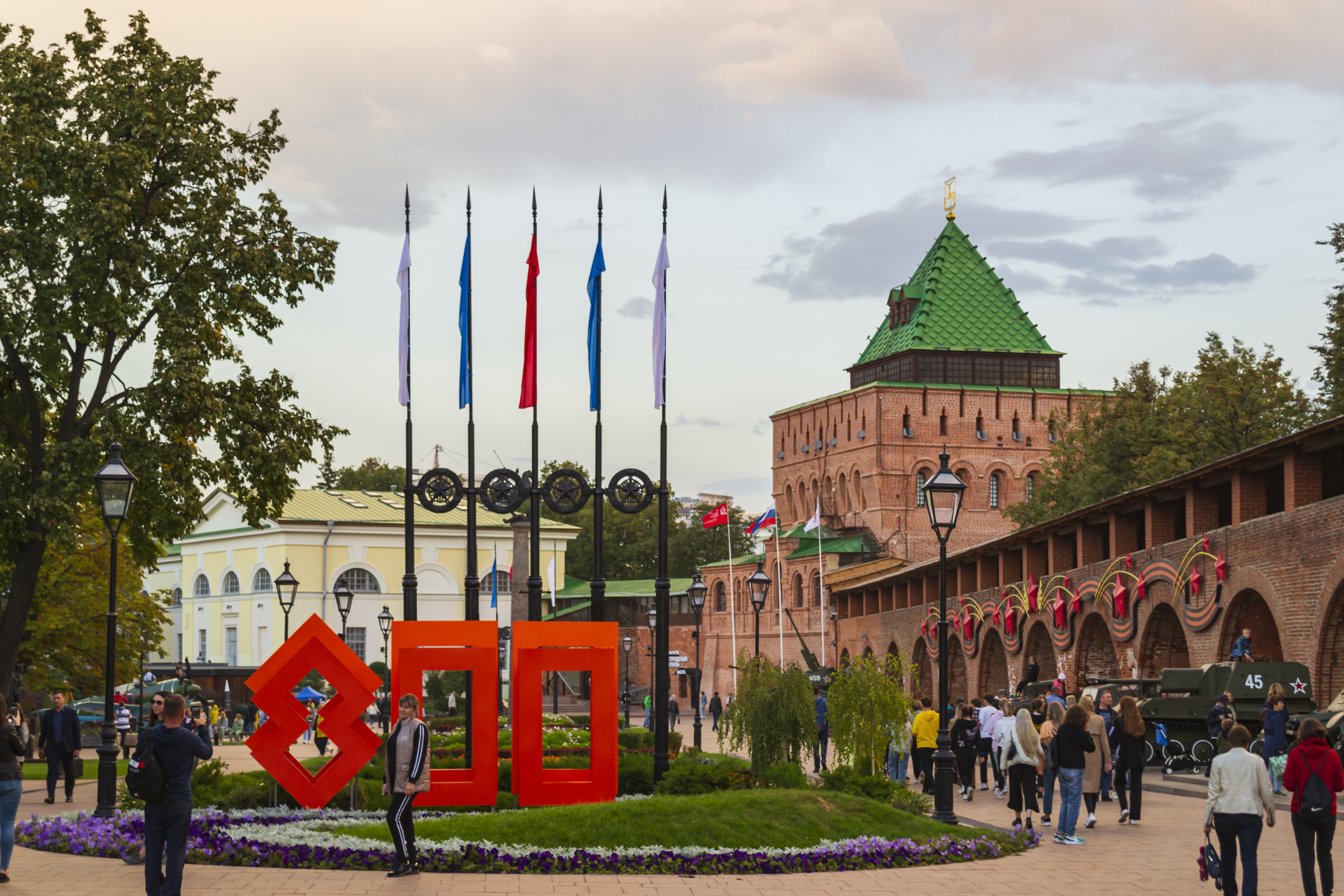
Military-patriotic memorial “Gorky for the front!”

Since 1980, the military-patriotic memorial “Gorky for the front!” has been located on the territory of the Kremlin. It presents the military equipment that Gorky supplied the Soviet army to the Eastern Front of World War II to fight the Nazi troops. At the entrance to the memorial there is a memorial sign faced with granite slabs. On one of the plates, the text is engraved: “From generation to generation, words will be passed on about those who defended the Soviet Motherland with weapons in their hands in a time of terrible trials, and about those who forged weapons, who built tanks and planes, who cooked steel for shells who, with their labor exploits, were worthy of the military valor of soldiers. Pravda, June 8, 1942.” Also, on the territory of the memorial on July 2, 2020, a monument was erected to “Gorky residents - valiant workers of the rear” and the city was awarded the title “City of Labour Valour”.
