= Moskovsky =

Moskovsky (masculine), Moskovskaya (feminine), or Moskovskoye (neuter) may refer to:

- Moskovsky District, name of several districts in the countries of the former Soviet Union
- Moscow Okrug (Moskovsky okrug), name of various divisions in Russia
- Moskovsky Settlement, an administrative and municipal division of the federal city of Moscow, Russia
- Moskovsky (inhabited locality) (Moskovskaya, Moskovskoye), several inhabited localities in Russia
- Moskovsky Rail Terminal (disambiguation), name of several rail terminals in Russia
- Moskovsky Avenue, a major avenue in St. Petersburg, Russia
- Moskovskiy, a location in Khatlon Province, Tajikistan
- Moscow Oblast (Moskovskaya oblast), a federal subject of Russia
- Moskovskaya metro station (disambiguation), several metro stations in Russia
- Moskovskaya (brand), a brand of Russian vodkas

== See also ==
- Moscow (disambiguation)
- Moskau (disambiguation)
- Moskva (disambiguation)
- Moszkowski
