= Moskovsky District, Russia =

Moskovsky District is the name of several administrative and municipal divisions in Russia. The districts are generally named for Moscow, the capital of Russia.

== Districts of the federal subjects ==
Location of St. Petersburg in Russia
- Moskovsky District, Saint Petersburg, an administrative district of the federal city of Saint Petersburg

== City divisions ==
1. Moskovsky City District, Cheboksary, a city district of Cheboksary, the capital of the Chuvash Republic
2. Moskovsky Administrative District, Kaliningrad, an administrative district of the city of Kaliningrad, the administrative center of Kaliningrad Oblast
3. Moskovsky Okrug, Kaluga, an okrug of the city of Kaluga, the administrative center of Kaluga Oblast
4. Moskovsky City District, Kazan, a city district of Kazan, the capital of the Republic of Tatarstan
5. Moskovsky City District, Nizhny Novgorod, a city district of Nizhny Novgorod, the administrative center of Nizhny Novgorod Oblast
6. Moskovsky City District, Ryazan, a city district of Ryazan, the administrative center of Ryazan Oblast
7. Moskovsky City District, Tver, a city district of Tver, the administrative center of Tver Oblast
Cities in Russia with a city division called "Moskovsky"

== See also ==
- Moskovsky (disambiguation)
- Moscow District (disambiguation)
- Moscow Okrug (disambiguation)
- Moscow (disambiguation)
