= Kartmazovo =

Kartmazovo (Russian: Картмазово) is the name of three rural localities in Russia:

- Kartmazovo, Moscow, a village in Moskovsky Settlement of Moscow
- Kartmazovo, Nizhny Novgorod Oblast, a selo in Bolshemurashkinsky District of Nizhny Novgorod Oblast
- Kartmazovo, Vladimir Oblast, a selo in Sudogodsky District of Vladimir Oblast
