= Line 2 (Nizhny Novgorod Metro) =

Metro line in Nizhny Novgorod, Russia

Sormovsko-Meshcherskaya

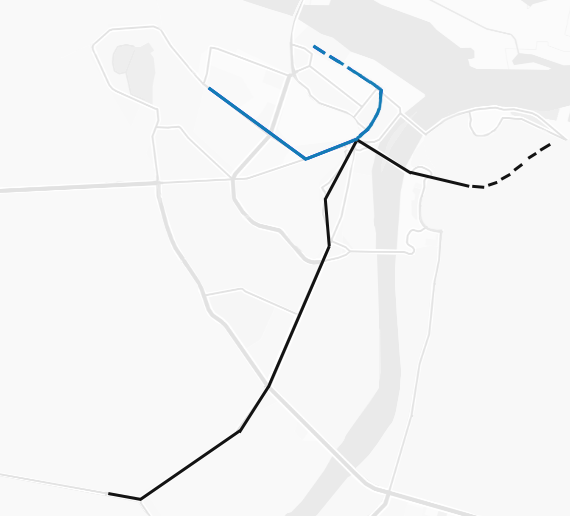

Overview
- Status: Operational
- Owner: Nizhny Novgorod Metro
- Locale: Nizhny Novgorod
- Stations: 5

Service
- Type: Rapid transit
- System: Nizhny Novgorod Metro

History
- Opened: 1993; 33 years ago
- Last extension: 2018

Technical
- Line length: 7.1 km (4.4 mi)
- Track gauge: 1,524 mm (5 ft)

The Sormovsko-Meshcherskaya line (Russian: Сóрмовско-Мещéрская) is the second line of the Nizhny Novgorod Metro. The line opened in 1993 and crosses the city on a northwest–southeast axis and is generally coloured blue on Metro maps. It comprises 4 stations and 3.8 km (2.4 mi) of track and bears the abbreviation "M2". The construction of the line continues. On June 12, 2018, the Strelka station was opened, in conjunction with the FIFA World Cup.

== History ==
The project of the second line began before the construction of the metro in the Soviet era. At that time, it carried the project name "Sormovsko-Nizhegorodskaya" and was supposed to connect the Lower City and the Upper City. This option planned the construction of 11 stations: Sormovskaya, Sportivnaya, Kalininskaya, Kuibyshevskaya, Kanavinskaya, Gorkovskaya, Sverdlovskaya, Ploshchad Svobody, Republikanskaya and Sovetskaya. In January 1981, the second line (Sormovsko-Nagornaya) was developed, but in March of the same year it was decided to extend the Avtozavodsko-Meshcherskaya line (project name of Line 1) to the Palace of Culture of the Avtozavodsky city district.

In December 1990, the development of the Sormovo-Meshcherskaya line to the stations Yarmarka, Strelka, Meshcherskoe ozero and Volga was approved. In January 1992, it was decided to rename the stations under construction: Kuibyshevskaya to Burnakovskaya, Kalininskaya to Burevestnik, Sportivnaya to Varya.

20 December 1993, the opening of two new stations of Nizhny Novgorod Metro - Kanavinskaya and Burnakovskaya which marked the beginning of the Sormovsko-Meshcherskaya line. 9 September 2002, the third station, Burevestnik, was opened on the line.

== Driving directionality ==
Traffic in Russian metros move on the right, but Sormovsko-Meshcherskaya line is an exception. This line was a branch of the Avtozavodskaya line until May 2018, and at Moskovskaya station the part of trains from Avtozavodskaya line used to go at the side tracks (instead of central), then go to Sormovsko-Meshcherskaya line in the opposite direction without any crossing. Therefore, this line moves on the left-hand traffic. This rule remains even after those lines became independent, due to need to speed up passenger interchange during the morning commute.

== Timeline ==
Segment	Date opened	Length	Number of stations
Moskovskaya	20 November 1985		1
Moskovskaya — Burnakovskaya	20 December 1993	2.6 km (1.6 mi)	2
Burnakovskaya — Burevestnik	9 September 2002	1.4 km (0.9 mi)	1
Moskovskaya — Strelka	12 June 2018	3.1 kilometres (1.9 mi)	1
	Only:	7.1 km (4.4 mi)	5 stations

== Stations and connections ==
(Strelka – Burevestnik)
Travel Time minutes	Station	Travel Time minutes	Connection	Nearby landmarks
3	Strelka	3	7, 41, 57, 66, 69	Nizhny Novgorod Stadium, Metro Cash and Carry, Decathlon, Sedmoe Nebo Mall, the Fair, Alexander Nevsky Cathedral, the Spit
0	Moskovskaya	3	City Rail; Nizhny Novgorod railway station 1, 3, 6, 7, 27, 417; 3, 4, 7, 17, 19, 22, 26, 43, 45, 48, 57, 61, 66, 69, 80, 90, 95; 7, 10, 15, 25	Moskovsky railway terminal, Metro Department, Central Department Store, Burger King, KFC, Gordeevsky Department Store
3	Kanavinskaya	3	3, 17, 22, 45, 48, 57, 69, 90, 95; 10, 15, 25	RIO Mall, Kanavinsky Bus station
3	Burnakovskaya	3	90, 95; 3	OKBM Afrikantov
3	Burevestnik	0	6, 7; 90, 95; 5	Nizhny Novgorod Machine-building Plant
