= Kanavinskaya (Nizhny Novgorod Metro) =

Nizhny Novgorod Metro Station

Kanavinskaya Канавинская
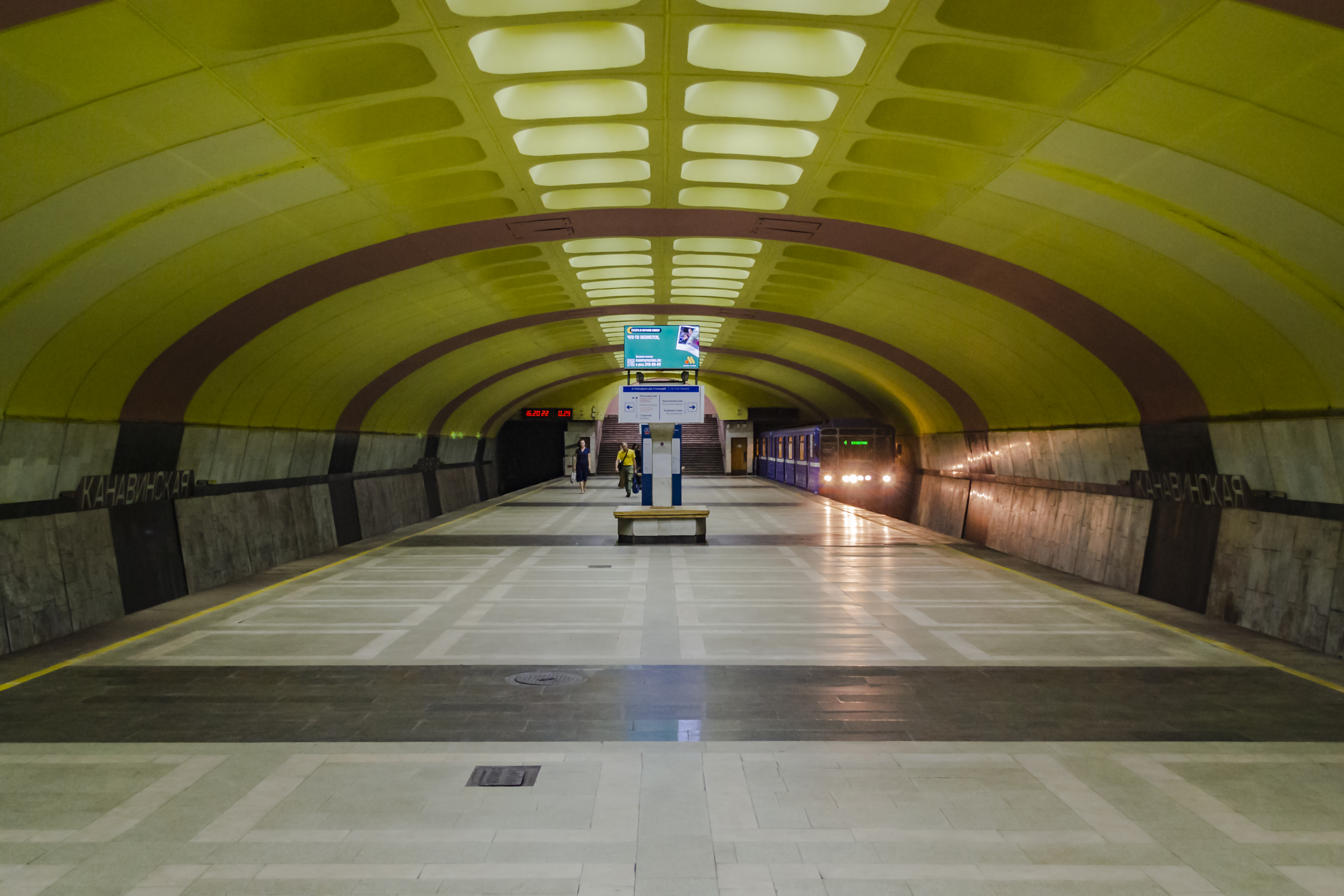

General information
- Coordinates: 56.3208°N 43.92556°E
- System: Nizhny Novgorod Metro station
- Line: Line 2
- Platforms: 2
- Tracks: 2
- Connections: 3, 17, 22, 45, 48, 57, 69, 90, 95; 10, 15, 25

Construction
- Structure type: Island

History
- Opened: 20 December 1993

Services
Preceding station	Nizhny Novgorod Metro	Following station
Moskovskaya towards Strelka	Line 2	Burnakovskaya towards Burevestnik
Location

Kanavinskaya (Russian: Канавинская) is a station of the Nizhny Novgorod Metro which was opened on 20 December 1993. It is on the Sormovskaya line between Moskovskaya and Burnakovskaya.

== Connections ==
The station has connections to tram and bus lines to Sormovsky, Moskovskaya, the city centre, and Dzerzhinsk.

== See also ==
- List of Nizhny Novgorod metro stations
