= Burnakovskaya (Nizhny Novgorod Metro) =

Nizhny Novgorod Metro Station

Burnakovskaya Бурнаковская
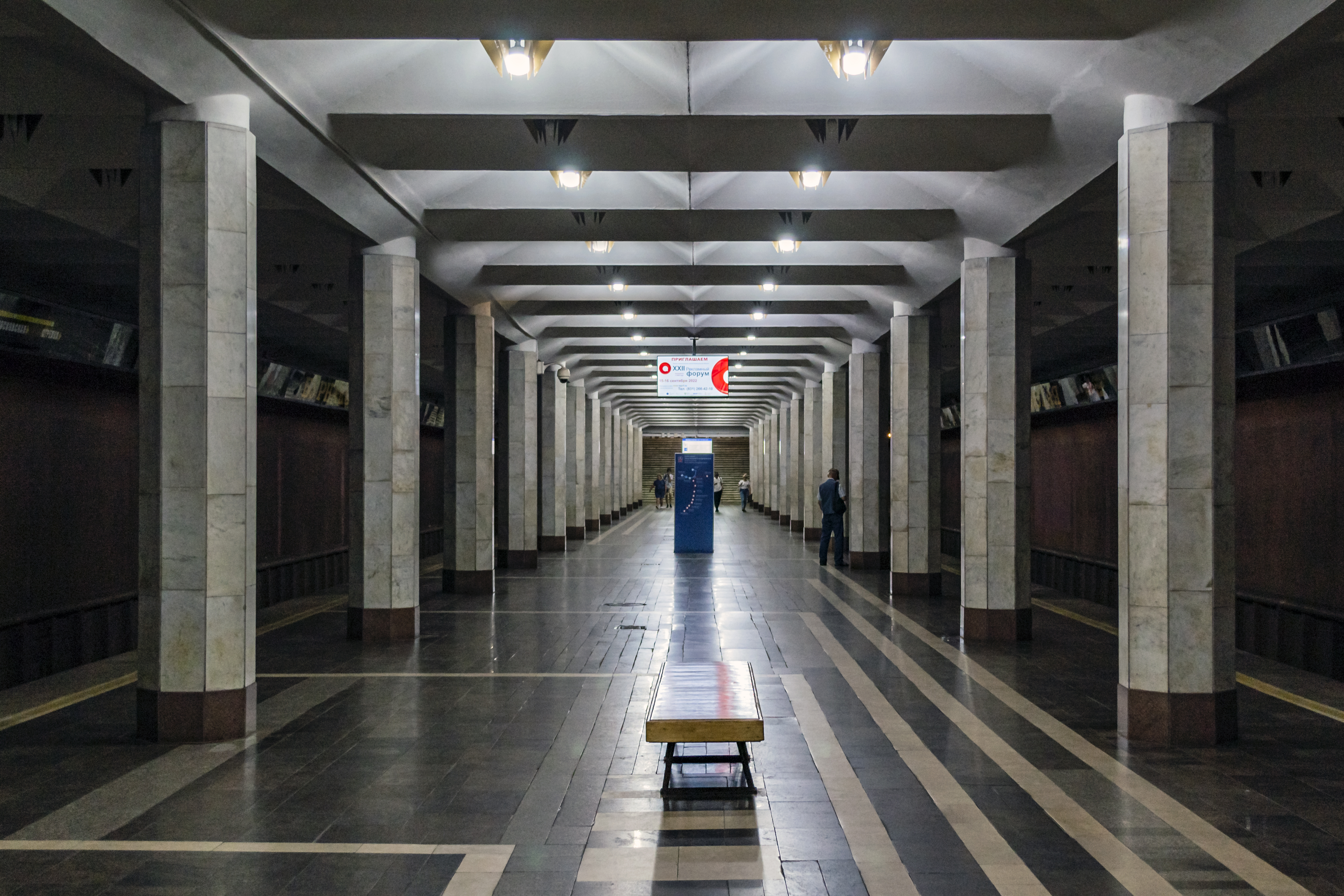
- Burnakovskaya station

General information
- Coordinates: 56.32732°N 43.91035°E
- System: Nizhny Novgorod Metro station
- Line: Line 2
- Platforms: 1 (Island platform)
- Tracks: 2
- Connections: 90, 95; 3

Construction
- Structure type: Three-span, shallow column station

History
- Opened: 20 December 1993

Services
Preceding station	Nizhny Novgorod Metro	Following station
Kanavinskaya towards Strelka	Line 2	Burevestnik Terminus
Location

Burnakovskaya (Russian: Бурнаковская) is a station on the Sormovsko–Meshcherskaya line of the Nizhny Novgorod Metro, in the Moskovsky district of Nizhny Novgorod, opened in 1993.

== Background ==
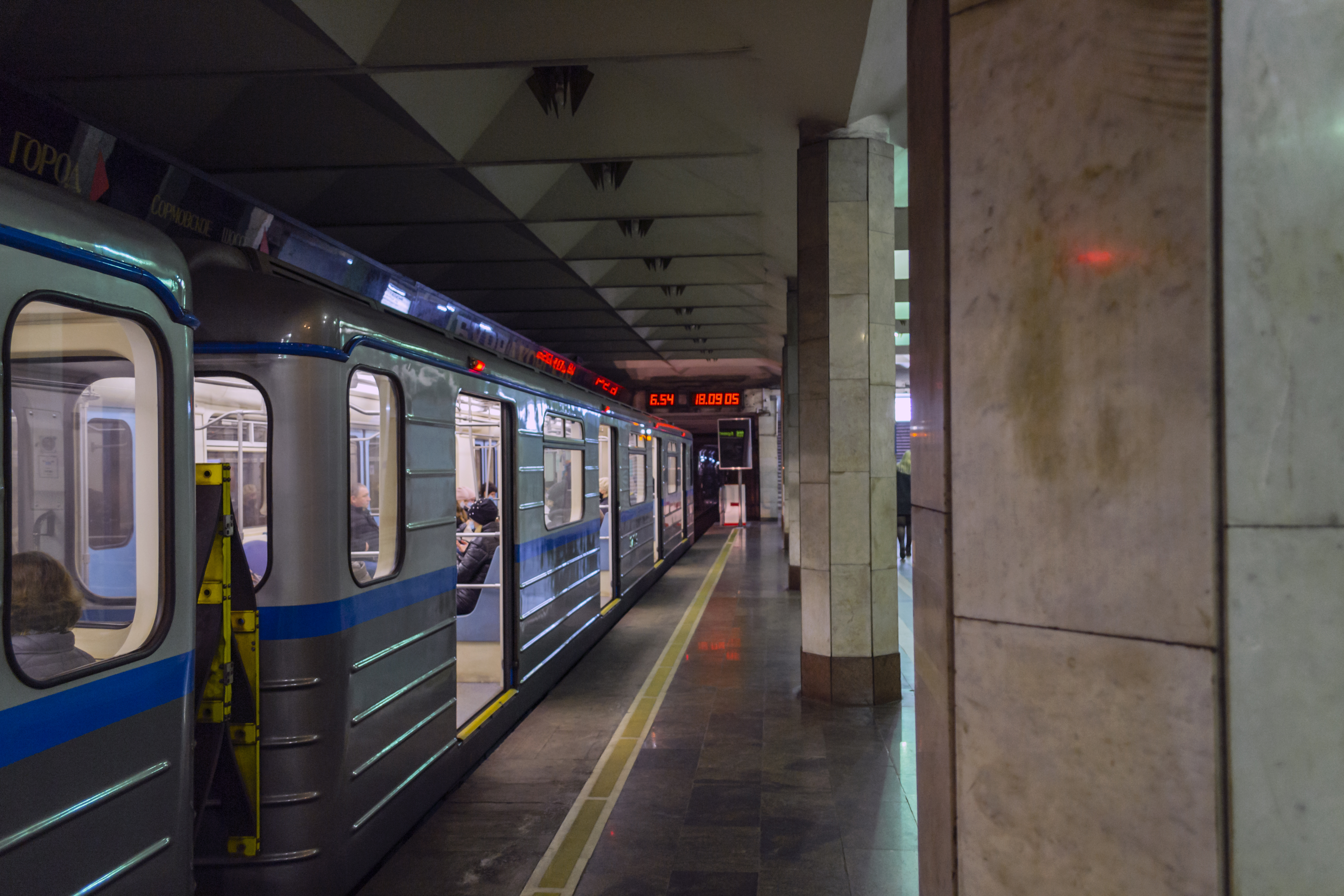
Train on station

Burnakovskaya opened on 20 December 1993. Until September 2002 with the opening of Burevestnik, it was the western terminus of the Sormovskaya line. Its name comes from the crossing of Burnakovsky and Kuibysheva Street with Sormovskiy Highway.

It has octagonal columns lined with white marble, and walls painted red, the bottom being lined with curved red roof tiles. The floor is paved with dark granite, crossed with strips of white marble.

== See also ==
- List of Nizhny Novgorod metro stations
