= Moskovskaya metro station =

Moskovskaya metro station may refer to:

- Moskovskaya (Nizhny Novgorod Metro), a station of the Nizhny Novgorod Metro, Nizhny Novgorod, Russia
- Moskovskaya (Saint Petersburg Metro), a station of the St. Petersburg Metro, St. Petersburg, Russia
- Moskovskaya (Samara Metro), a station of the Samara Metro, Samara, Russia
- Moskovskaya (Moscow Metro), a station of the Moscow Metro, Moscow, Russia

== See also ==
- Moskovsky (disambiguation)
