= Moskovsky (inhabited locality) =

Moskovsky (Russian: Моско́вский; masculine), Moskovskaya (Моско́вская; feminine), or Moskovskoye (Моско́вское; neuter) is the name of several inhabited localities in Russia.

Urban localities

- Moskovsky, Moscow, formerly a town in Leninsky District of Moscow Oblast, merged into the city of Moscow on July 1, 2012

Rural localities

- Moskovsky, Altai Krai, a settlement in Krutikhinsky District of Altai Krai
- Moskovsky, Chelyabinsk Oblast, a settlement in Chesmensky District of Chelyabinsk Oblast
- Moskovsky, name of several other rural localities
- Moskovskaya (rural locality), a village in Afanasyevsky District of Kirov Oblast
- Moskovskoye, Republic of Khakassia, a selo in Ust-Abakansky District of the Republic of Khakassia
- Moskovskoye, Stavropol Krai, a selo in Izobilnensky District of Stavropol Krai
