= New Moscow =

New Moscow may refer to:

- New Moscow, Ohio, an unincorporated community in the United States
- New Moscow, Moscow, a territorial expansion of the city of Moscow, Russia
- Novaya Moskva, a number of inhabited localities in Russia
- 1889 name of a Russian settlement in Sagallo, present-day Djibouti
- The New Moscow, a 1938 film
- New Moscow (painting), a 1937 painting by Yuri Pimenov
- Nieuw Moscou, a village near Hoogeveen, Netherlands

== See also ==
- Moscow (disambiguation)
