= Moscow District =

Moscow District may refer to:

- Moskovsky District, name of several districts in the countries of the former Soviet Union
- Moscow Military District (1864–2010), a former military district of Russia
- One of the districts of Moscow, Russia
