= Moskovskaya (Nizhny Novgorod Metro) =

Nizhny Novgorod Metro Station

Moskovskaya Московская
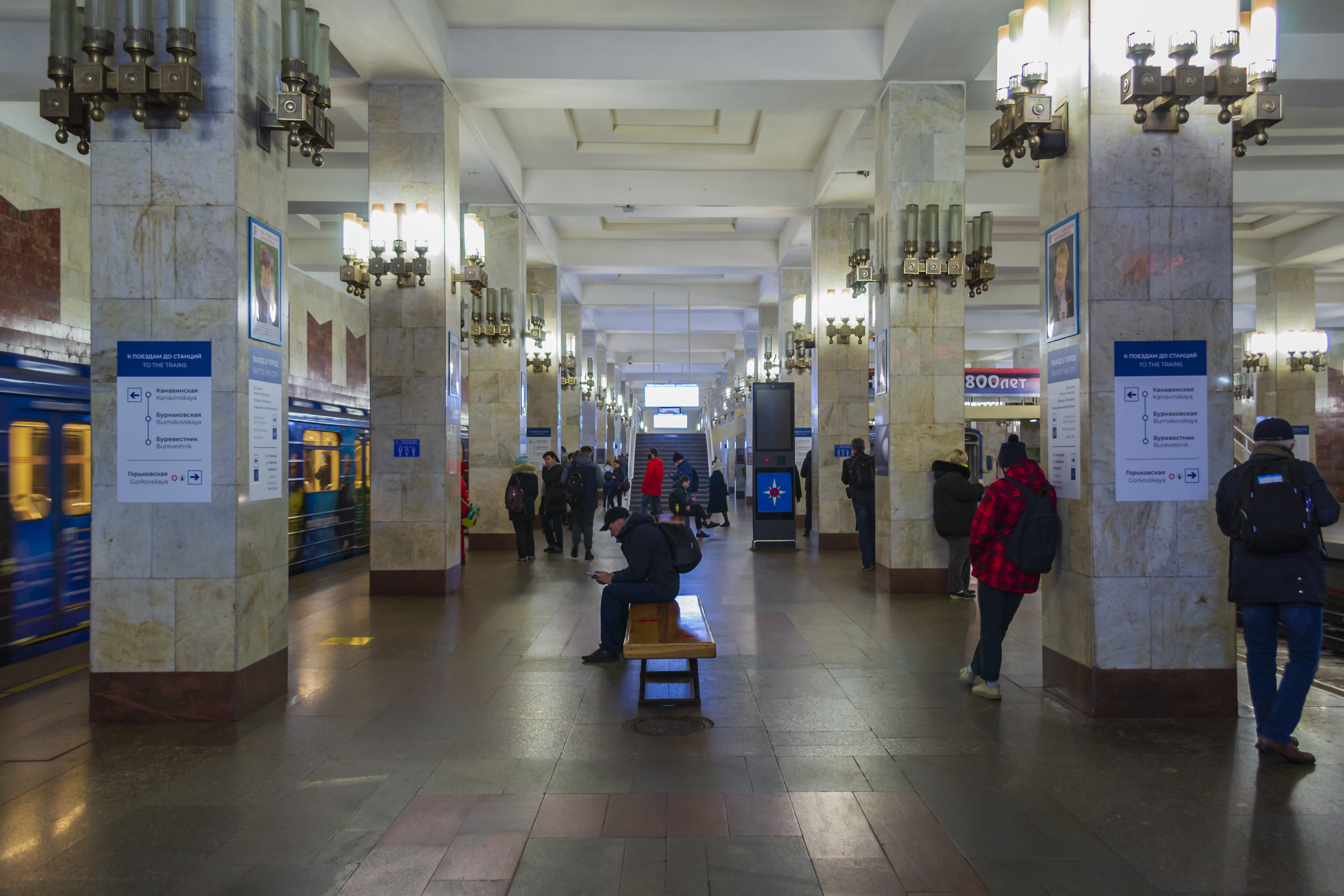
- Tracks of Line 1

General information
- Location: Kanavinsky City District; Nizhny Novgorod; Russia
- Coordinates: 56°19′17″N 43°56′43″E
- System: Nizhny Novgorod Metro station
- Operator: Nizhegorodskoe Metro
- Lines: Line 1 Line 2
- Platforms: 2
- Tracks: 4
- Connections: City Rail; Nizhny Novgorod railway station 1, 3, 6, 7, 27, 417; 3, 4, 7, 17, 19, 22, 26, 43, 45, 48, 57, 61, 66, 69, 80, 90, 95; 7, 10, 15, 2

Construction
- Structure type: Five-span, shallow column station
- Parking: Yes
- Cycle facilities: No

History
- Opened: 20 November 1985

Services
Preceding station	Nizhny Novgorod Metro	Following station
Gorkovskaya Terminus	Line 1	Chkalovskaya towards Park Kultury
Strelka Terminus	Line 2	Kanavinskaya towards Burevestnik
Location

Moskovskaya (Russian: Московская) is a station on both Line 1 and Line 2 line of the Nizhny Novgorod Metro. It was one of the first six stations to open on the line on 20 November 1985. It is also the only station that permits transfers from one line to the other; its two-platform and four-track layout allows a cross-platform interchange between the lines, wherein the central tracks serve Line 1, while the outer tracks serve Line 2. The station also allows the passenger to transfer may also transfer to the Nizhny Novgorod railway station and the Nizhny Novgorod City Rail

Until 2012, it was the northern terminus of the Avtozavodskaya line and, until the opening of Strelka station in 2018, it was the eastern terminus of the Sormovsko–Meshcherskaya line. Because the line curves westbound after Moskovskaya, it remains the easternmost station on the line.

It is in the Kanavinsky City District. The name comes from the Moskovsky railway station, which is, in turn, named after Moscow. Moscow Metro has a station called Nizhegorodskaya (lit. Nizhny Novgorod Station), which has a very similar two-platform layout to that of Moskovskaya.

== History ==
The construction of the station began in 1977. The Moskovskaya station was built in an open way, due to which many roads and the station square were blocked. The station was built immediately under the perspective two lines, was make it the largest in the Soviet Union and today's Russia. In addition to the station itself, an extensive network of tunnels was built on the approach to it. Some of them connected the metro station with the Moskovsky railway station. The last such tunnel was built in 2018 and connected the station to the Central Department Store.

During the construction of the station, in 1984, the walls collapsed in its pit killing two workers from the student brigade. This accident served as the appearance of an "urban legend" about ghosts wandering through tunnels and stations. Workers at the station told that they had heard strange sounds in the tunnels: groans, gnash of iron or the sound of jackhammers. However, people are skeptical and believe that extraneous sounds in tunnels are a consequence of the penetration and activity of "diggers".

The station opened on 20 November 1985, as part of the first starting area of the Nizhny Novgorod metro "Moskovskaya — Proletarskaya".

From 1985 to 1993, she was the terminal station for the only Avtozavodskaya line. After the opening of the first section of the Sormovskaya line "Moskovskaya - Kanavinskaya", it became final for her. A fork movement was organized at the station - trains of the Avtozavodskaya line "turned around" at the station and continued on their way along the Sormovskaya line. On November 4, 2012, after the opening of the Gorkovskaya station, it ceased to be the terminus for Avtozavodskaya line. And, after the opening of the Strelka station, June 12, 2018, the station has ceased to be terminus for both lines.

=== Name ===
The metro station got its name because of the Moskovsky railway station and the Moscow highway. The project name is "Moskovsky vokzal".

== Entrances and interchanges ==
The station has two underground vestibules for ingress and egress of passengers. Exit from the south-west hall leads to a long underground passage to the Moskovsky railway station and to the Moscow highway. On both sides of the station are stairs and escalators. Since November 4, 2012, the station is located transfer bridge from Line 1 to Line 2. One of the entrances is located next to the Revolution Square. Another entrance to the station was built in the building of the Central Department Store.

== Nearby ==
- Moskovsky railway terminal
- The Metro Department
- Central Department Store
- Mebelny bazar Mall
- Burger King
- Vkusno i tochka
- Respublika Shopping сentre
- Gordeevsky Department Store
- Kanavinskiy Bus Station
- Minin University
- College of Railway Transport
- Chkalov Shopping centre
- The Central Bazaar
- Kanavinsky Shopping centre

== Connection ==
=== Nizhny Novgorod City Rail ===
#	Line	Route	Number of stations
1	Sormovskaya	Nizhny Novgorod railway station - Pochinki	7
2	Priokskaya	Nizhny Novgorod railway station - Prospekt Gagarina	12
Total:			19

== Gallery ==
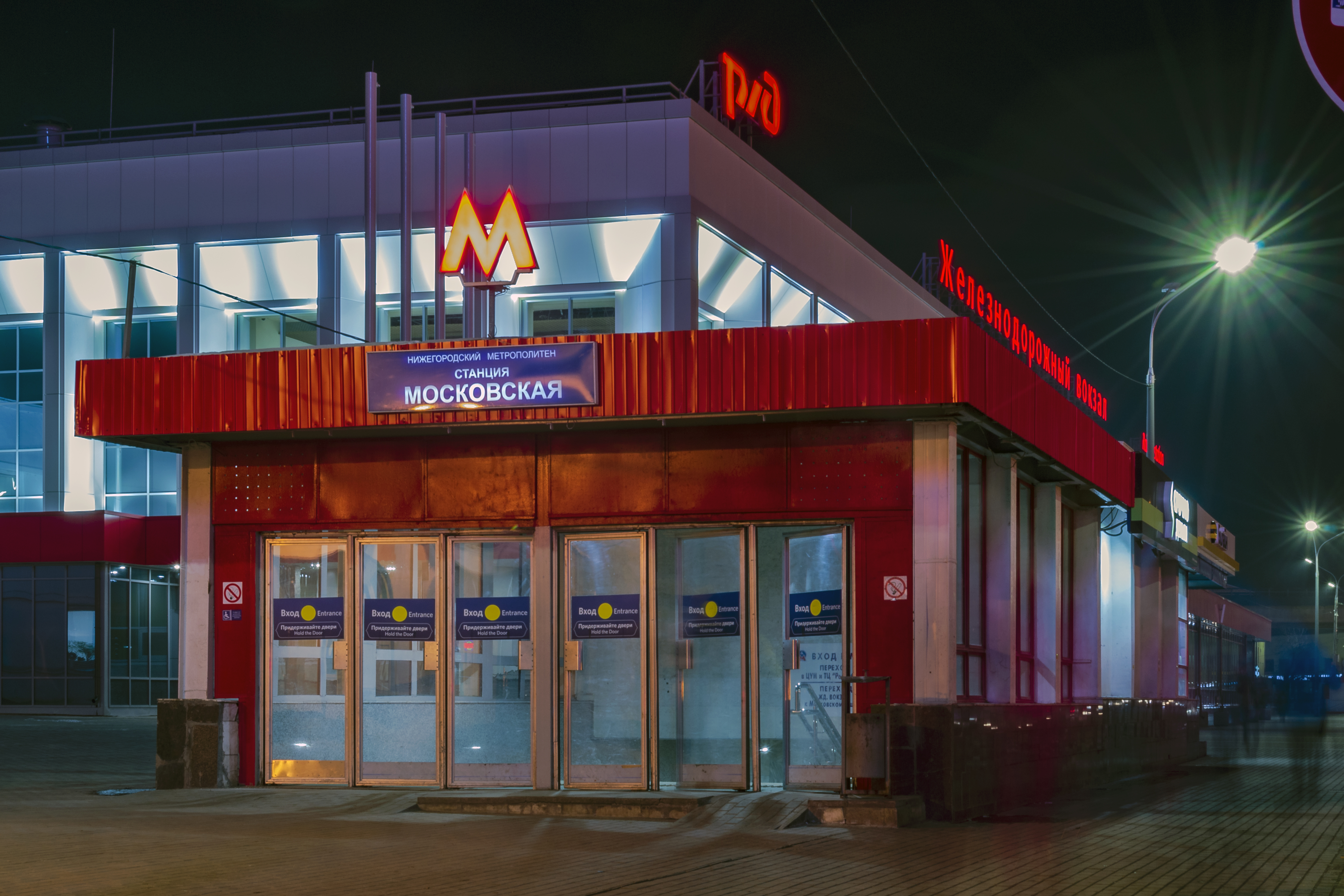
Entrance to the station near the train station

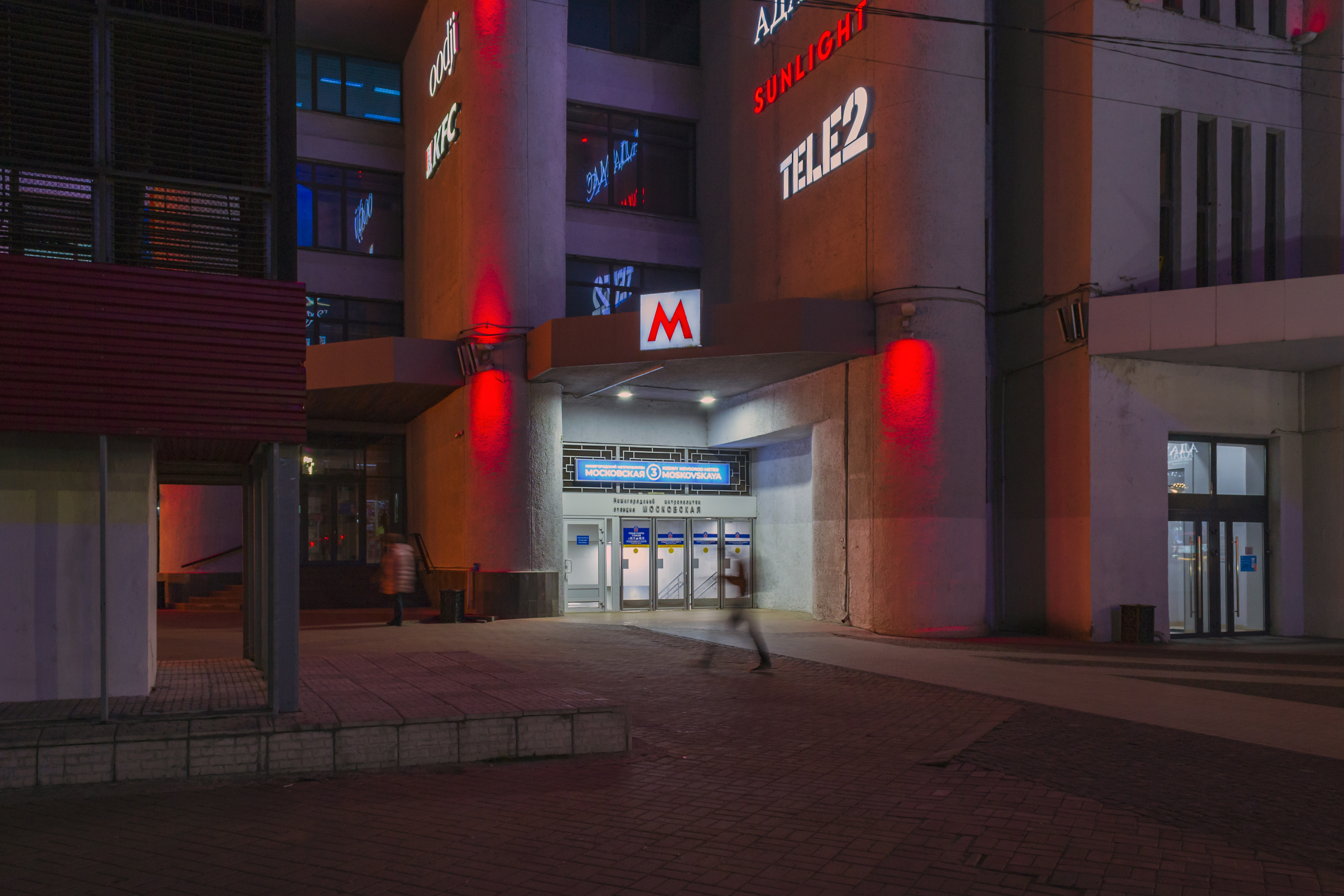
Entrance to the station in the building of the Central Department Store

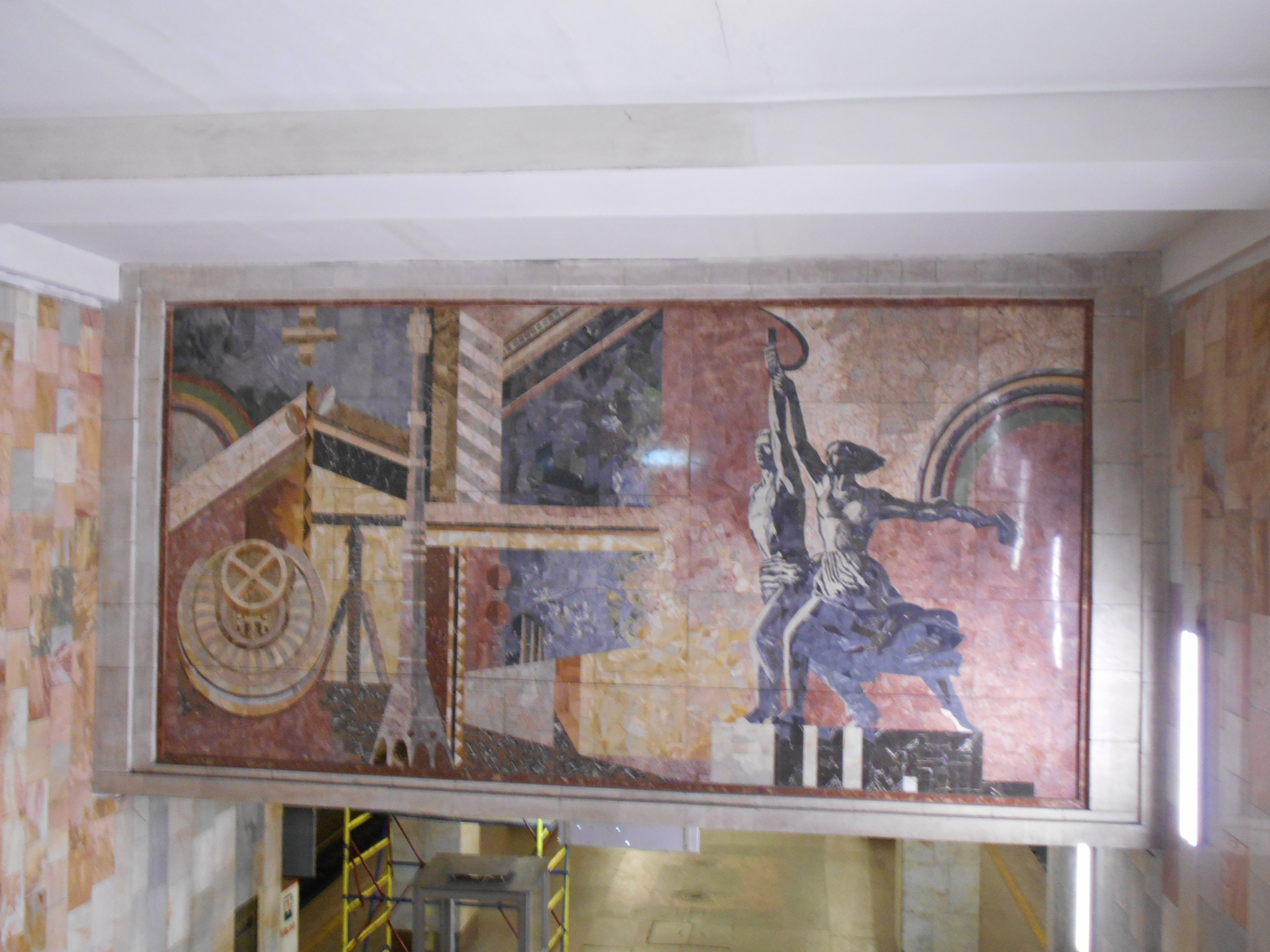
Panel above the descent to the platform

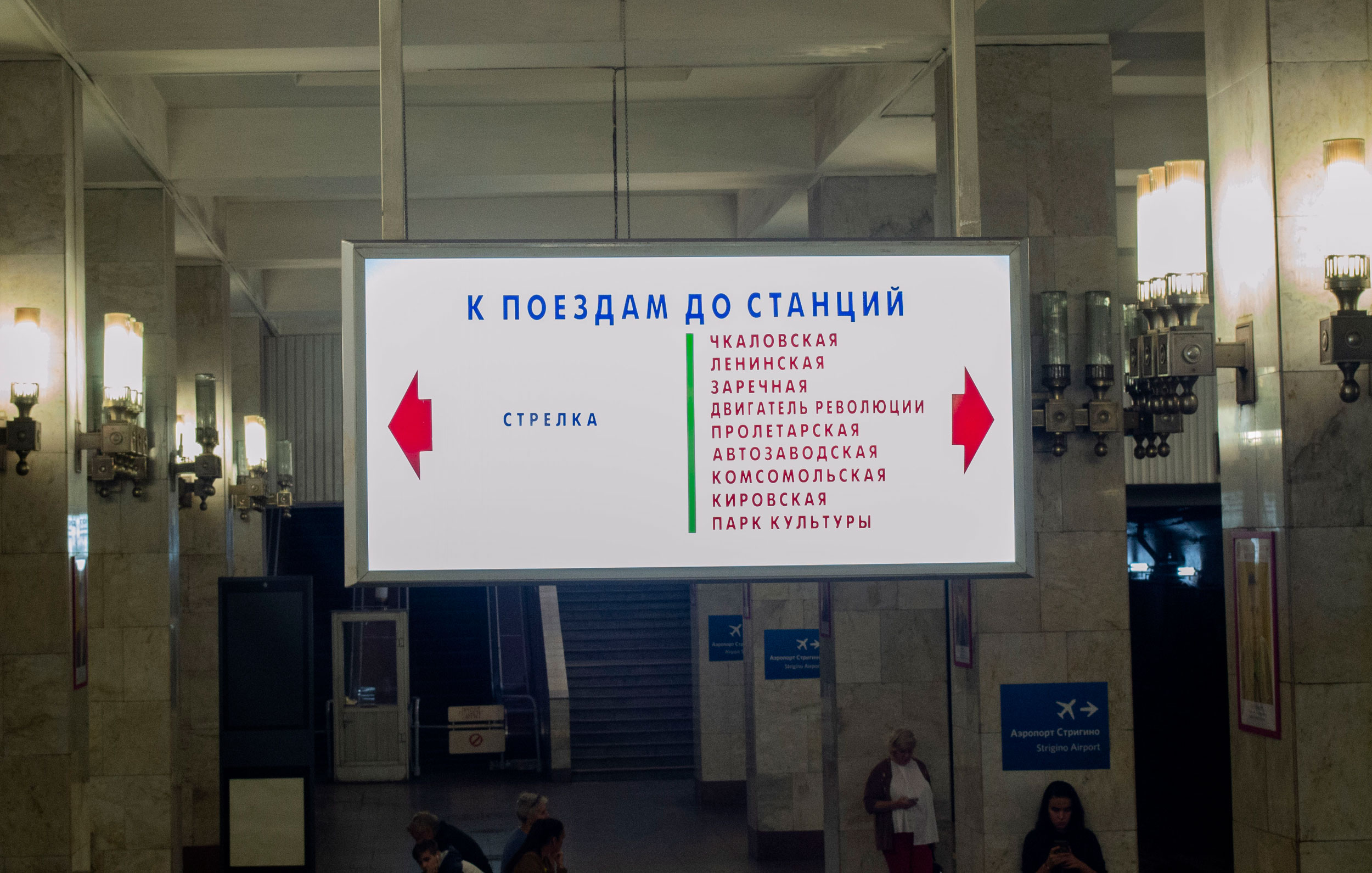
Pointer to the platform

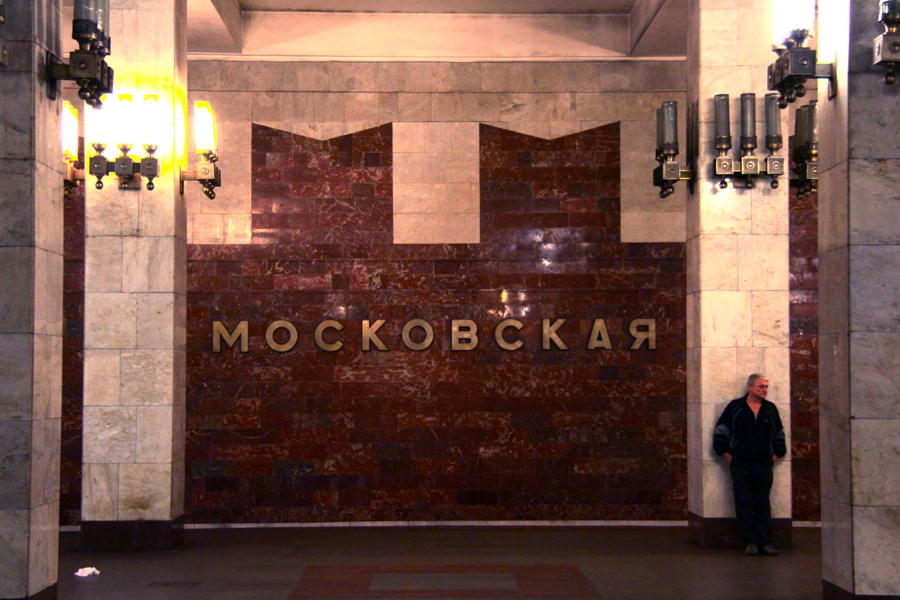
Station name on track wall

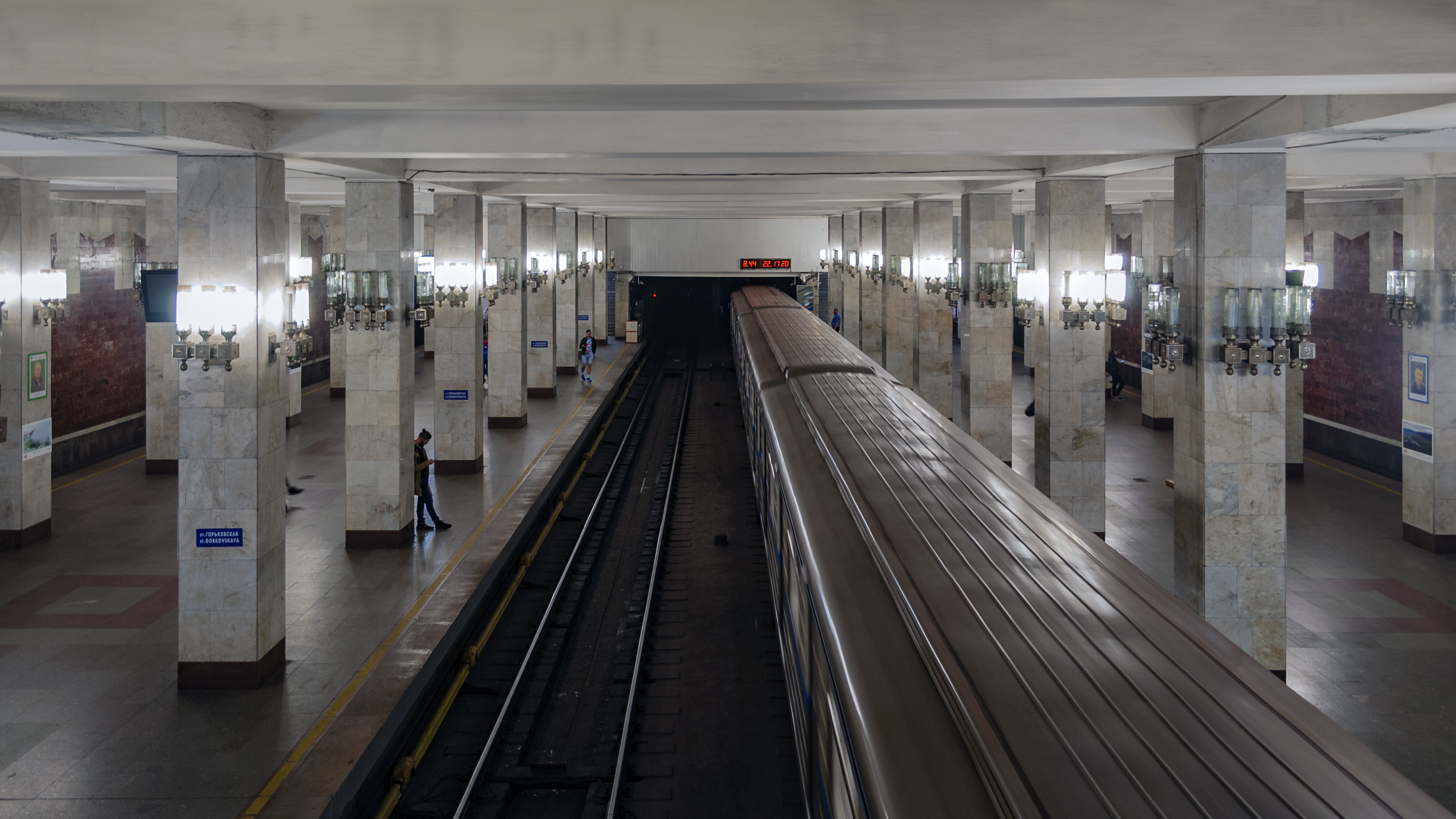
The train is on the central track. View from the bridge

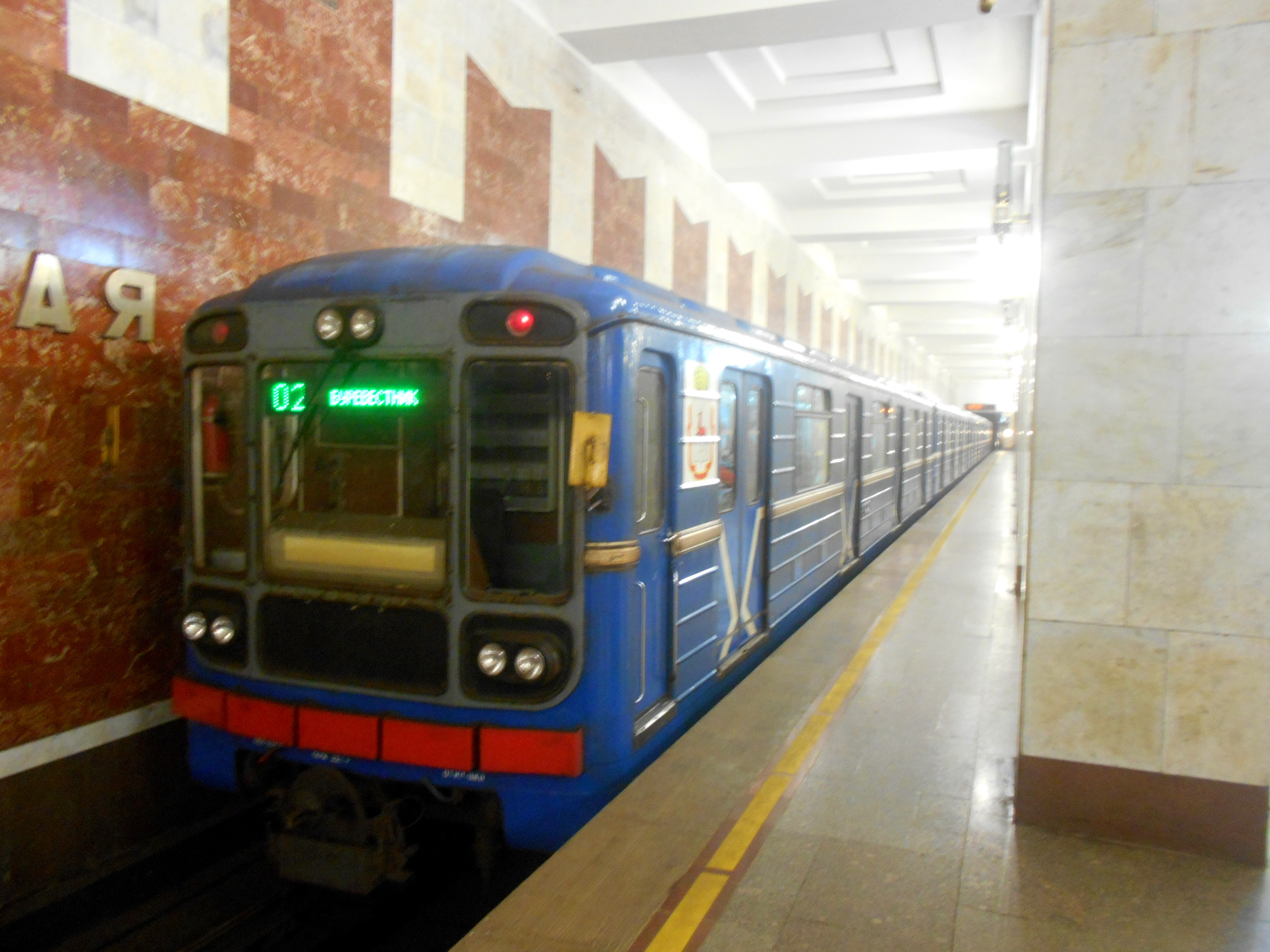
The train is on the side track of the station. Sormovskaya line

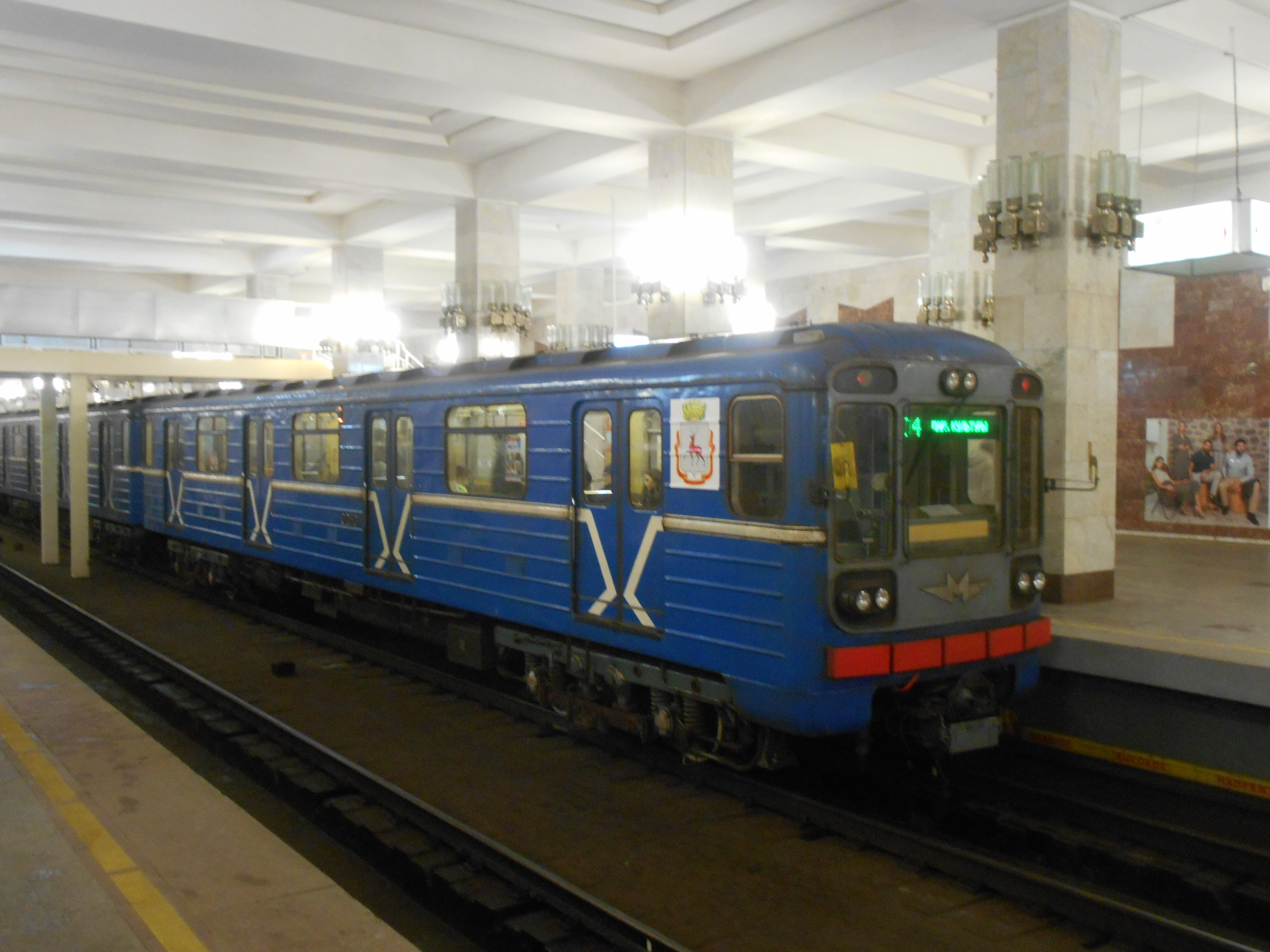
Train on the central station track. Avtozavodskaya line
