= Moskau =

Moskau may refer to:

- The German name for Moscow
- "Moskau", a song by Dschinghis Khan from their self-titled album
- "Moskau", a song by Rammstein from the album Reise, Reise
- Reichskommissariat Moskau, a proposed civilian Nazi occupation regime

== See also ==
- Moscow (disambiguation)
- Moskovsky (disambiguation)
- Moskva (disambiguation)
