= Mosco =

Mosco may refer to the following people:

Given name

- Mosco Carner (1904–1985), Austrian-born British musicologist, conductor and critic
- Mosco de la Merced I (Juan Domínguez, born 1977), Mexican professional wrestler
- Mosco de la Merced II (Juan Valdez, born 1964), Mexican professional wrestler

Surname

- Benjamín Mosco (born 1985), Mexican football player
- Harry Mosco (d. 2012), the lead vocalist of the Nigerian afro-rock band The Funkees
- Maisie Mosco (1924–2011), English writer
- Rosemary Mosco, Canadian cartoonist
- Steve Mosco, the central figure in The British reggae band Jah Warrior
- Umberto Mosco, Italian mathematician
  - Mosco convergence in mathematical analysis, discovered by Umberto Mosco

== See also ==
- Moscow (disambiguation)
