= Moskovsky Rail Terminal =

Moskovsky Rail Terminal may refer to:

- Moskovsky Rail Terminal (Nizhny Novgorod), a rail terminal in Nizhny Novgorod, Russia
- Moskovsky Rail Terminal (Saint Petersburg), a rail terminal in St. Petersburg, Russia
- Moskovsky Rail Terminal (Tula)

== See also ==
- Moscow railway station (disambiguation)
