= Moscow railway station =

Moscow railway station may refer to one of the ten rail terminals in the capital of Russia:

- Moscow Belorussky railway station, serving long distance trains to regions west and south-west
- Moscow Kazansky railway station, serving eastbound lines to Kazan and Ryazan
- Moscow Kiyevsky railway station, serving regular services to Kyiv
- Moscow Kursky railway station, serving trains toward Kursk and into Ukraine, and toward Nizhniy Novgorod
- Moscow Leningradsky railway station, serving north-western directions including Saint Petersburg, Estonia, and Finland
- Moscow Paveletsky railway station, serving lines radiating south-east from Moscow
- Moscow Rizhsky railway station, serving suburban trains and Latvia
- Moscow Savyolovsky railway station, serving suburban directions north of the city
- Moscow Vostochny railway station, an interchange station on the Little Ring of the Moscow Railway
- Moscow Yaroslavsky railway station, serving eastern destinations

== See also ==
- Moskovsky Rail Terminal (disambiguation)
- Category:Railway stations in Moscow
