= Moscow (disambiguation) =

Moscow is the capital of Russia.

Moscow may also refer to:

== Music ==
- Moscow (Tchaikovsky), 1883 cantata by Tchaikovsky
- Oh Moscow, an album by Lindsay Cooper
- Moscow (Giardini), a hymn tune by Felice Giardini, also called Italian Hymn
- "Moscow", English version of the song "Moskau" by German band Dschinghis Khan
- Moscow, Idaho, an EP by The Cassandra Complex

== Places ==
=== United States ===
- Moscow, Lamar County, Alabama, unincorporated
- Moscow, Marengo County, Alabama, unincorporated
- Moscow, Arkansas, unincorporated
- Moscow, Idaho, a city
- Moscow, Indiana, unincorporated
- Moscow, Iowa, unincorporated
- Moscow, Kansas, a city
- Moscow, Kentucky, unincorporated
- Moscow, Maine, a town
- Moscow, Maryland, unincorporated and census-designated place
- Moscow, Michigan, an unincorporated community
- Moscow, Minnesota, unincorporated
- Moscow, Mississippi, unincorporated
- Moscow, Ohio, a village
- Moscow, Licking County, Ohio, a ghost town
- Moscow, Pennsylvania, a borough
- Moscow, Tennessee, a city
- Moscow, Texas, unincorporated
- Moscow, Vermont, unincorporated
- Moscow, West Virginia, unincorporated
- Moscow, Wisconsin, a town
- Moscow (community), Wisconsin, unincorporated

=== Elsewhere ===
- Moscow, a hamlet within the township of Stone Mills, Ontario, Canada
- Moscow, India, a village in the Kottayam district of Kerala, India
- Moscow Oblast, the federal subject that surrounds the Russian capital
- Moscow, East Ayrshire, a hamlet in East Ayrshire, Scotland

== Other uses ==
- David Moscow (born 1974), American actor
- FC Moscow, a Russian football club
- Moscow (cycling team), a Russian road-racing team 2009–2010
- MoSCoW method, a prioritisation technique used in business analysis and software development
- Moscow Patriarchate, the "Bishop of Moscow", or primate of the Russian Orthodox Church
- Moscow-850, a giant Ferris wheel located at the All-Russia Exhibition Centre, Moscow

== See also ==
- Mosco (disambiguation)
- Moscou, Ghent, Belgium
- Moskau (disambiguation)
- Moskovsky (disambiguation)
- Moskva (disambiguation)
- New Moscow (disambiguation)
- Moscow Township (disambiguation)
