= Moscow Township =

Moscow Township may refer to the following places in the United States:

- Moscow Township, Muscatine County, Iowa
- Moscow Township, Stevens County, Kansas, in Stevens County, Kansas
- Moscow Township, Michigan
- Moscow Township, Freeborn County, Minnesota
- Moscow Township, Cavalier County, North Dakota, in Cavalier County, North Dakota
