= Nizhny Novgorod City Rail =

Railway network in Nizhny Novgorod, Russia

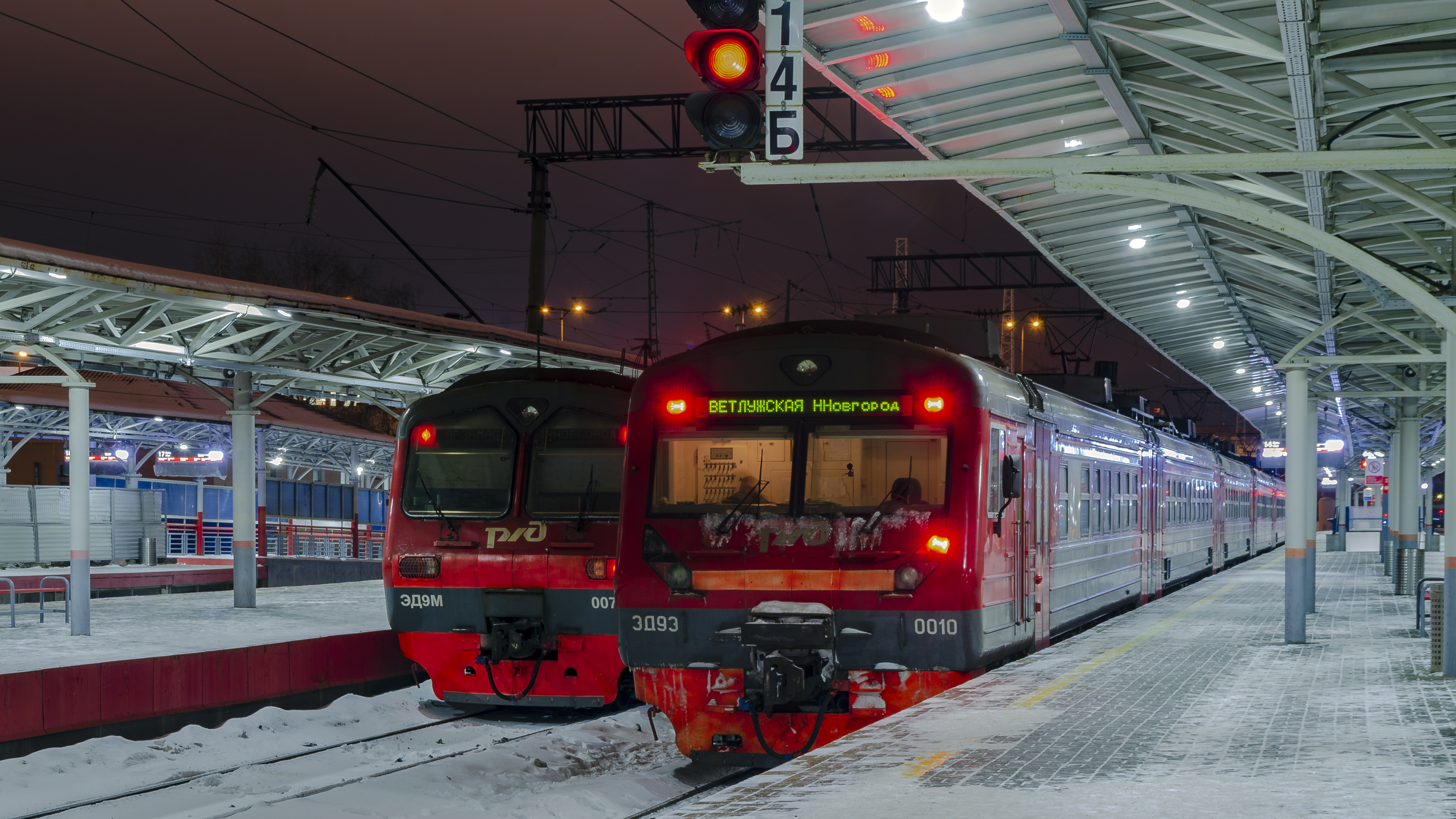
- Electric train of the Priokskaya line at the Nizhny Novgorod railway station

Overview
- Native name: Нижегородская городская электричка
- Owner: Russian Railway
- Locale: Nizhny Novgorod, Russia
- Transit type: Commuter rail
- Number of lines: 3
- Number of stations: 27
- Annual ridership: 437 000 (2017)
- Website: Nizhny Novgorod City Rail

Operation
- Began operation: June 24, 2013
- Operator: Gorky Railway
System map

Nizhny Novgorod City Rail (Russian: Нижегородская городская электричка, romanized: Nizhegorodskaya gorodskaya elektrichka) are a system of city train services on existing commuter rail lines in Nizhny Novgorod and Nizhny Novgorod Oblast, Russia. Together with the metro it forms a system of high-speed rail transport of the city. It has 2 lines – Sormovskaya and Priokskaya. It was founded on June 24, 2013 on the basis of the Gorky Railway, as an addition to the metro.

== Network ==
=== Lines ===
#	Line	Route	Number of stations
1	Sormovskaya-1	Nizhny Novgorod railway station – Dubravnaya	11
2	Sormovskaya-2	Pochinki – Varya	4
3	Priokskaya	Nizhny Novgorod railway station – Prospekt Gagarina	13
Total:			28

Sormovskaya line – it has 7 stations and connects Sormovsky City District and Nizhny Novgorod railway station. This makes it an alternative to the metro line in Sormovo. It has an interchange from the railway station to the metro station Moskovskaya. For a free interchange, passengers can use the boarding pass for 90 minutes.

Priokskaya line – it has 12 stations and 5 interchange stations at the Nizhny Novgorod railway station, the Nizhny Novgorod-Sortirovochny, Petryaevka, Okskaya and Prospekt Gagarina stations. It partially intersects with the suburb and connects the Kanavinsky, Leninsky, Avtozavodsky, Nizhegorodsky and Prioksky City Districts. It has different tariff zones due to some stations being located outside the city.

Sormovskaya-2 line is the test section from the Pochinki station to the Varya station. It consists of three stations and connects the 7th microdistrict with the center of Sormovo and partially with the Burevestnik metro station. The distance between these stations can be reached by tram with a free transfer on a transport card. The test run at peak hours occurred on February 1, 2020, with the full opening of the line on May 1, 2020.

In addition to the main one line, there are two other directions that are not included in the City Rail system: "Doskino – Kustovaya". The fare here is equal to the fare in any city public transport. There are also interchange stations for the City Rail. Station Kustovaya is located near the metro station Komsomolskaya, and is an indirect interchange node between them.

== The fare ==
On the Sormovskaya Line the fare is 40 rubles (approximately 0.48 euros or 0.47 US Dollars). As well as on all city public transport.

On the Priokskaya Line the fare is 40 rubles from Nizhny Novgorod railway station to Petryaevka station and from Petryaevka station to Prospekt Gagarina station.

On the Second Sormovskaya line, the fare is 40 rubles.

== See also ==
- Nizhny Novgorod Metro
- Trams in Nizhny Novgorod
- Gorky Railway
