= Moskovsky District =

Moskovsky District may refer to:

- Maskowski District (Moskovsky District), a city district of Minsk, Belarus
- Moskva District, Kyrgyzstan (Moskovsky District), a district of Chuy Region, Kyrgyzstan
- Moskovsky District, Russia, several districts and city districts in Russia
- Moskovsky District, name of Hamadoni District, Tajikistan, in 1950–2004
- Moskovskyi District, name of Saltivskyi District, Kharkiv, Ukraine, in 1961–2022
- Moskovskyi District, a former district of Kyiv, Ukraine, before 2001
