= Moskovsky, Altai Krai =

Moskovsky Московский
- Settlement
- Location within Altai Krai Location within Russia
- Coordinates: 54°00′N 80°37′E
- Country: Russia
- Region: Altai Krai
- District: Krutikhinsky District
- Time zone: UTC+7:00

Moskovsky (Russian: Московский) is a rural locality (a settlement) in Volchno-Burlinsky Selsoviet, Krutikhinsky District, Altai Krai, Russia. The population was 37 as of 2013. There are 3 streets.

== Geography ==
Moskovsky is located 44 km west of Krutikha (the district's administrative centre) by road. Volchno-Burlinskoye and Romanovo are the nearest rural localities.
