= Novaya Moskva =

Novaya Moskva (Russian: Но́вая Москва́, lit. new Moscow) is the name of several rural localities in Russia:

- Novaya Moskva, Bryansk Oblast, a settlement under the administrative jurisdiction of Krasnogorsky Settlement Administrative Okrug in Krasnogorsky District of Bryansk Oblast; 53°1′N 31°33′E
- Novaya Moskva, Nizhny Novgorod Oblast, a settlement in Tolsko-Maydansky Selsoviet of Lukoyanovsky District in Nizhny Novgorod Oblast
- Novaya Moskva, Primorsky Krai, a village in Shkotovsky District of Primorsky Krai

== See also ==
- Troitsky Administrative Okrug and Novomoskovsky Administrative Okrug, two new administrative districts of Moscow, Russia
