= Kartmazovo, Vladimir Oblast =

Rural locality in Vladimir Oblast, Russia

Coordinates: 56°3′50″N 41°5′54″E

Kartmazovo is a rural locality (a (selo) in Andreyevskoye Rural Settlement, Sudogodsky District of Vladimir Oblast, Russia. Population: 218 (2010 census); 197 (2002 census);

== Geography ==
The village is located 22 km north-east from Sudogda.
