= Kartmazovo, Moscow =

Kartmazovo Картмазово
- Village
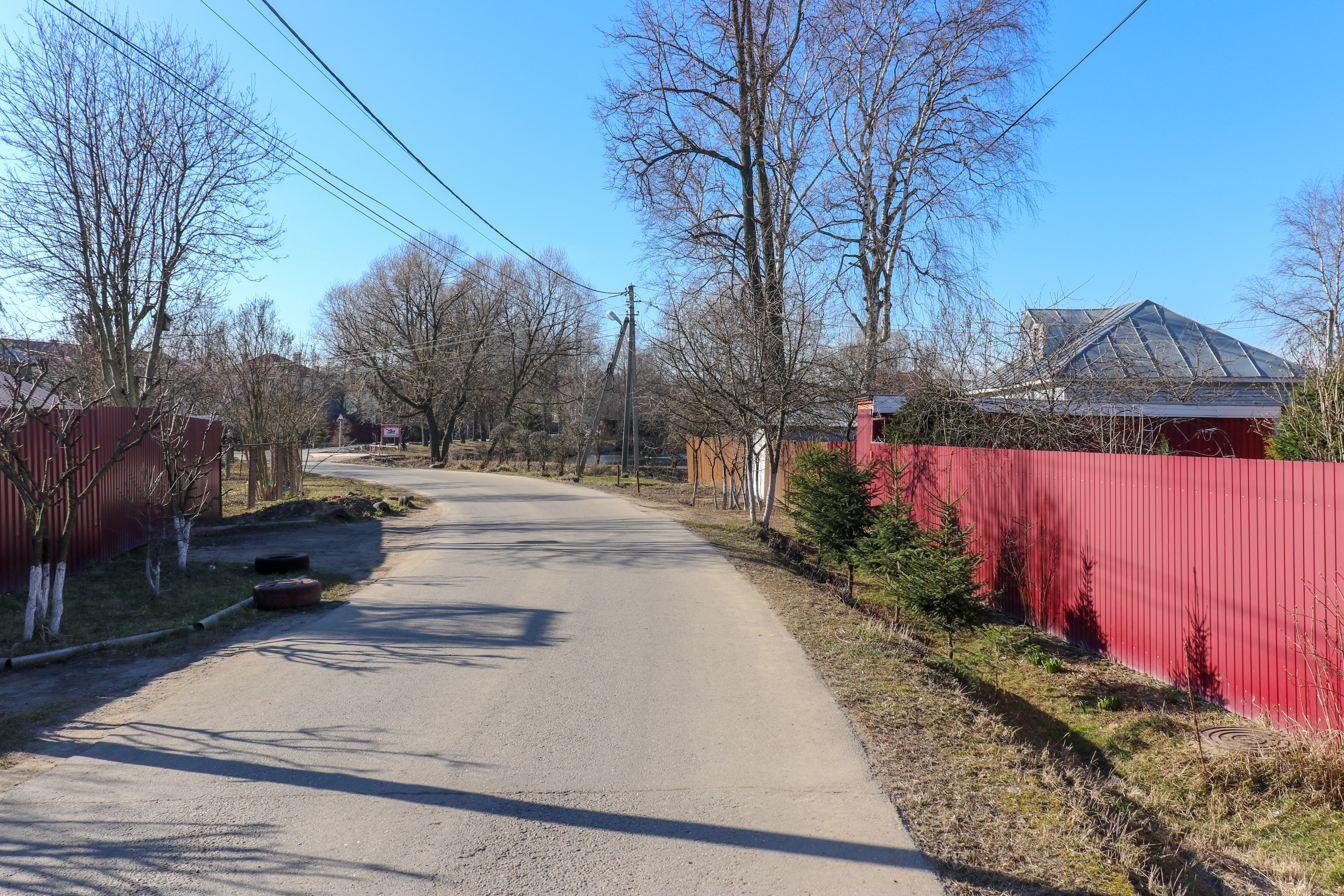
- The village of Kartmazovo as part of Moscow

- Location within Moscow Location within Russia
- Coordinates: 55°36′58″N 37°23′36″E
- Country: Russia
- Region: Moscow
- District: Novomoskovsky Administrative Okrug
- Time zone: UTC+03:00

Kartmazovo (Russian: Картмазово) is a rural locality (a (selo) in Moskovsky Settlement of Moscow, Russia. Population: 308 (2010 census); 99 (2002 census);
