= Moskovsky, Moscow =

Moskovsky Московский
- Town
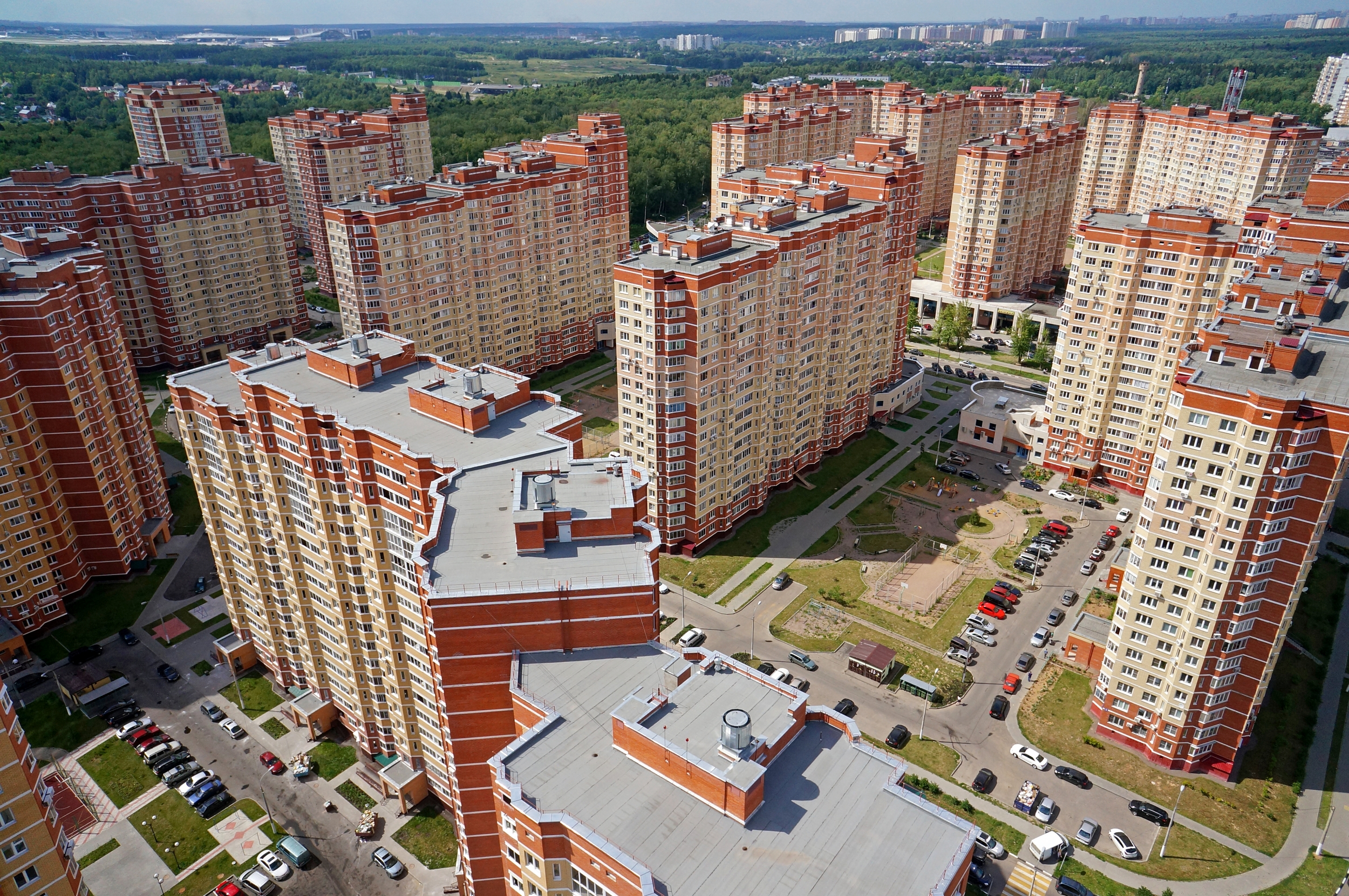
- Moskovsky, South-West Microdistrict

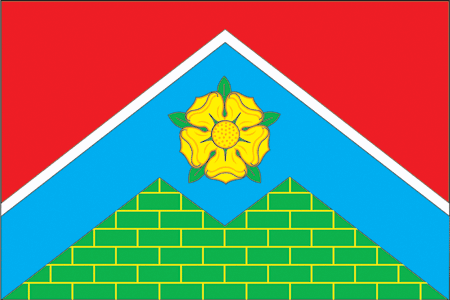
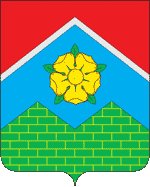
- Flag Coat of arms
- Interactive map of Moskovsky
- Location of Moskovsky Moskovsky (Moscow)
- Coordinates: 55°36′N 37°21′E
- Country: Russia
- Federal subject: Moscow
- Founded: 1969
- Town status since: 2004
- Elevation: 185 m (607 ft)

Population (2010 Census)
  - Total: 17,366
  - Estimate (2020): 59,218 (+241%)

Administrative status
  - Subordinated to: Moskovsky Settlement
  - Capital of: Moskovsky Settlement

Municipal status
  - Urban okrug: Moskovsky Settlement
  - Capital of: Moskovsky Settlement
- Postal code: 108811

Moskovsky (Russian: Моско́вский) is a town in Moskovsky Settlement of Moscow. The town of Moskovsky was formerly located in Leninsky District of Moscow Oblast, Russia, and since July 2012 it is a part of the federal city of Moscow. It is located 25 kilometers (16 mi) southwest of the center Moscow and 5 kilometers (3.1 mi) east of Vnukovo International Airport. Population: 17,366 (2010 census); 15,563 (2002 census).

It was founded in 1968 as a rural locality around the agricultural company Mosagro (Agrokombinat "Moskovsky"). Town status was granted to it in 2004. On July 1, 2012 Moskovsky was transferred to the city of Moscow and became a part of Novomoskovsky Administrative Okrug.

Route 876 and 876e currently connect Moskovsky with Salaryevo metro station via M3 Highway.

It is to note, however, that transport accessibility from the town to the station is slow: congested highway doesn't provide quick access to the metro station on hours of morning commute, since Moscovsky serves as a gateway from New Moscow to M3 highway.
