= Burevestnik (Nizhny Novgorod Metro) =

Nizhny Novgorod Metro Station

Burevestnik Буревестник
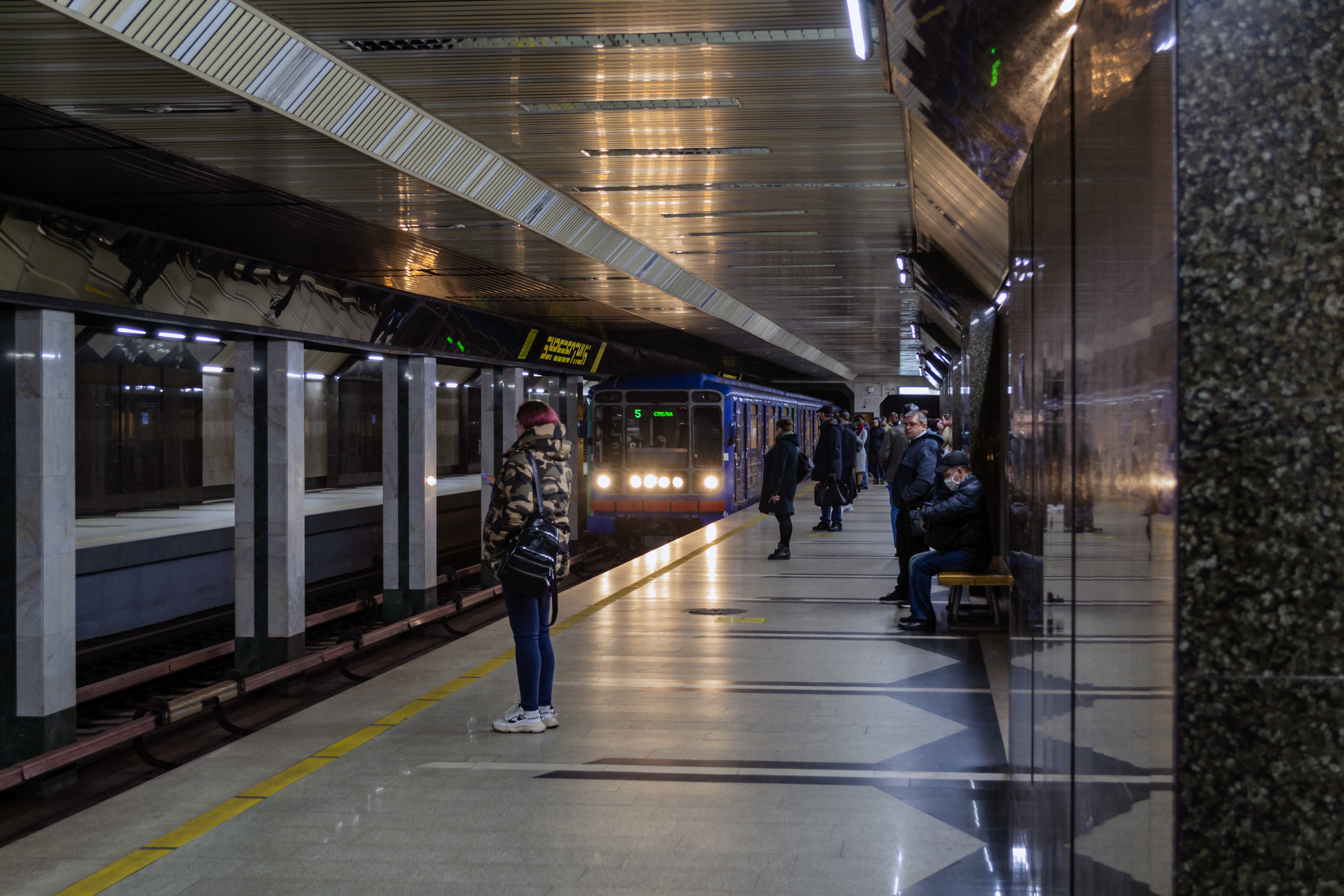

General information
- Coordinates: 56.3333°N 43.8942°E
- System: Nizhny Novgorod Metro station
- Line: Line 2
- Platforms: 2
- Tracks: 2
- Connections: 6, 7; 90, 95; 5

History
- Opened: 9 September 2002
- Former names: Kalininskaya (planning phase)

Services
Preceding station	Nizhny Novgorod Metro	Following station
Burnakovskaya towards Strelka	Line 2	Terminus
Location

Burevestnik (Russian: Буревестник) is a station of the Nizhny Novgorod Metro which was opened on 9 September 2002. It is the western terminus station on the Sormovsko–Meshcherskaya line. The name translates as "Petrel". It is named after the novel of the same name by Maxim Gorky.

== Location ==
The station is located under the Sormovskoye Highway in the Moskovsky District. In the planning phase, the station was called Kalininskaya, after the Soviet politician Mikhail Kalinin. The station is located half underground in the basement of a building of the subway company.

== Architecture ==
It is the only subway station in Nizhny Novgorod that has two platforms on the outside of the tracks. Between the tracks there is a row of columns, above which the name of the station is mounted. The platforms and walls are covered with dark gray and white marble, and the ceiling is decorated with metal and plastic. The station hall is located above the tracks and is connected to the street by stairs.

== Connections ==
The station has connections to many tram and bus lines to the north west of Nizhny Novgorod, a part of the city not served by the metro.

== See also ==
- List of Nizhny Novgorod metro stations
