= Moscow Okrug =

Moscow Okrug may refer to:

- Moscow Okrug, Moscow Oblast (1929–1930), a former administrative division of Moscow Oblast, Russian SFSR, Soviet Union
- Moskovsky Okrug, Kaluga, a division of the city of Kaluga, Russia
