= Nizhny Novgorod railway station =

Railway station in Nizhny Novgorod, Nizhny Novgorod, Russia

Nizhny Novgorod Нижний Новгород
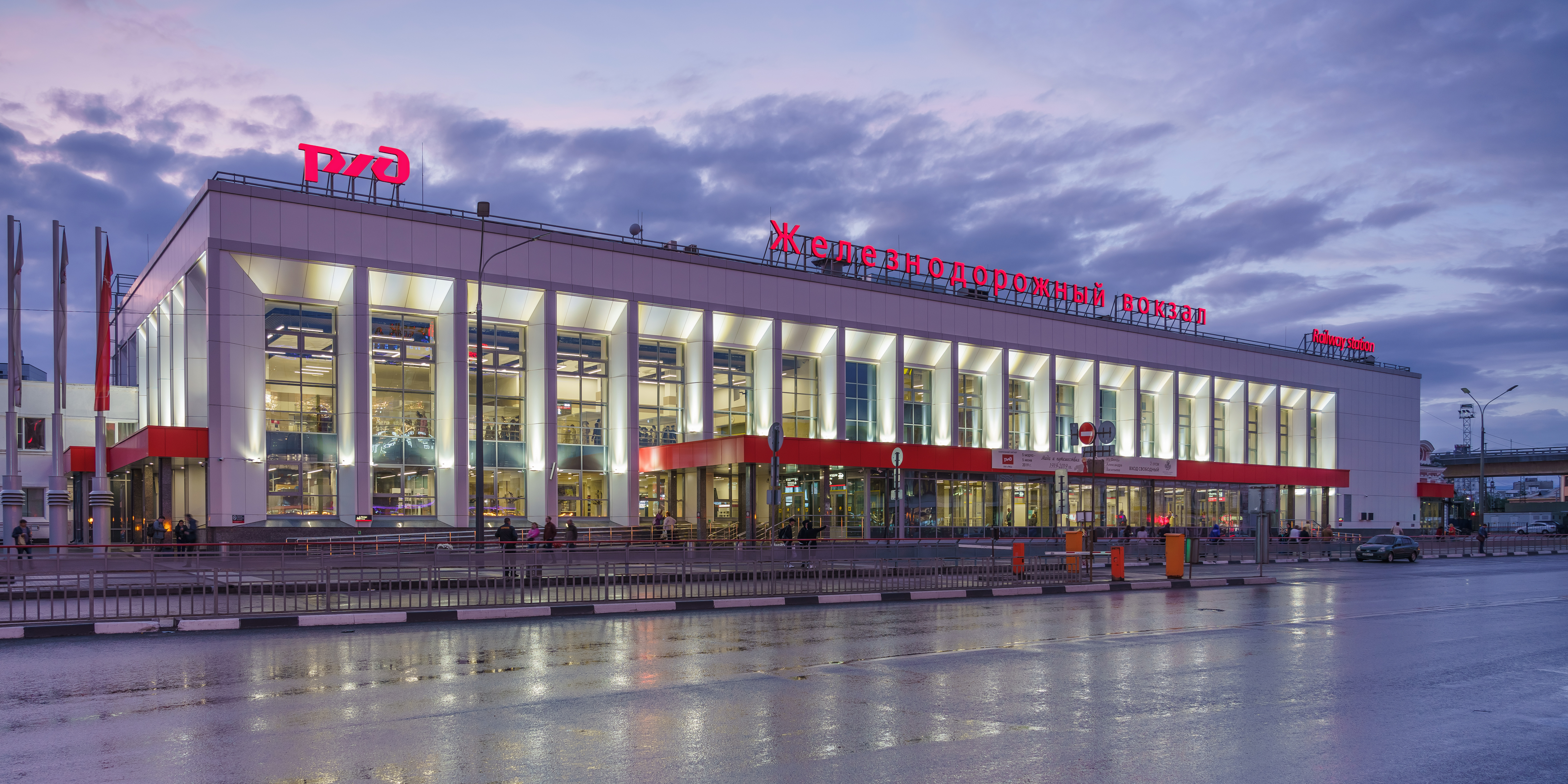
- Railway terminal

General information
- Location: 2, Revolution Square; Nizhny Novgorod; Russia
- Coordinates: 56°19′19″N 43°56′45″E
- System: Nizhny Novgorod-Moskovsky
- Owner: Russian Railways
- Operator: Gorky Railway
- Platforms: 6 (5 island platforms)
- Tracks: 13
- Connections: Nizhny Novgorod Metro stations: Moskovskaya (Avtozavodskaya line); Moskovskaya (Sormovskaya line); Nizhny Novgorod City Rail: Sormovskaya line (1) Priokskaya line (2)

Construction
- Structure type: At-grade
- Parking: Yes
- Cycle facilities: Yes

Other information
- Station code: 260200
- Fare zone: 0

History
- Opened: 1862
- Rebuilt: 1960, 2018
- Electrified: 1957
- Former names: Moskovsky; Gorky-Moskovsky

Services
Preceding station	Nizhny Novgorod City Rail	Following station
Terminus	Sormovskaya-1	Kostarikha towards Dubravnaya
Terminus	Priokskaya Line	435 km. towards Prospekt Gagarina
Preceding station	Russian Railways	Following station
Dzerzhinsk towards Moscow Kursky	Lastochka	Terminus
Location

Nizhny Novgorod railway station (Russian: Вокзал Нижний Новгород until 2010 Gorky-Moskovsky Russian: Горький-Московский) is a central station in Nizhny Novgorod, Russia. It was opened on August 2, 1862.

== History ==
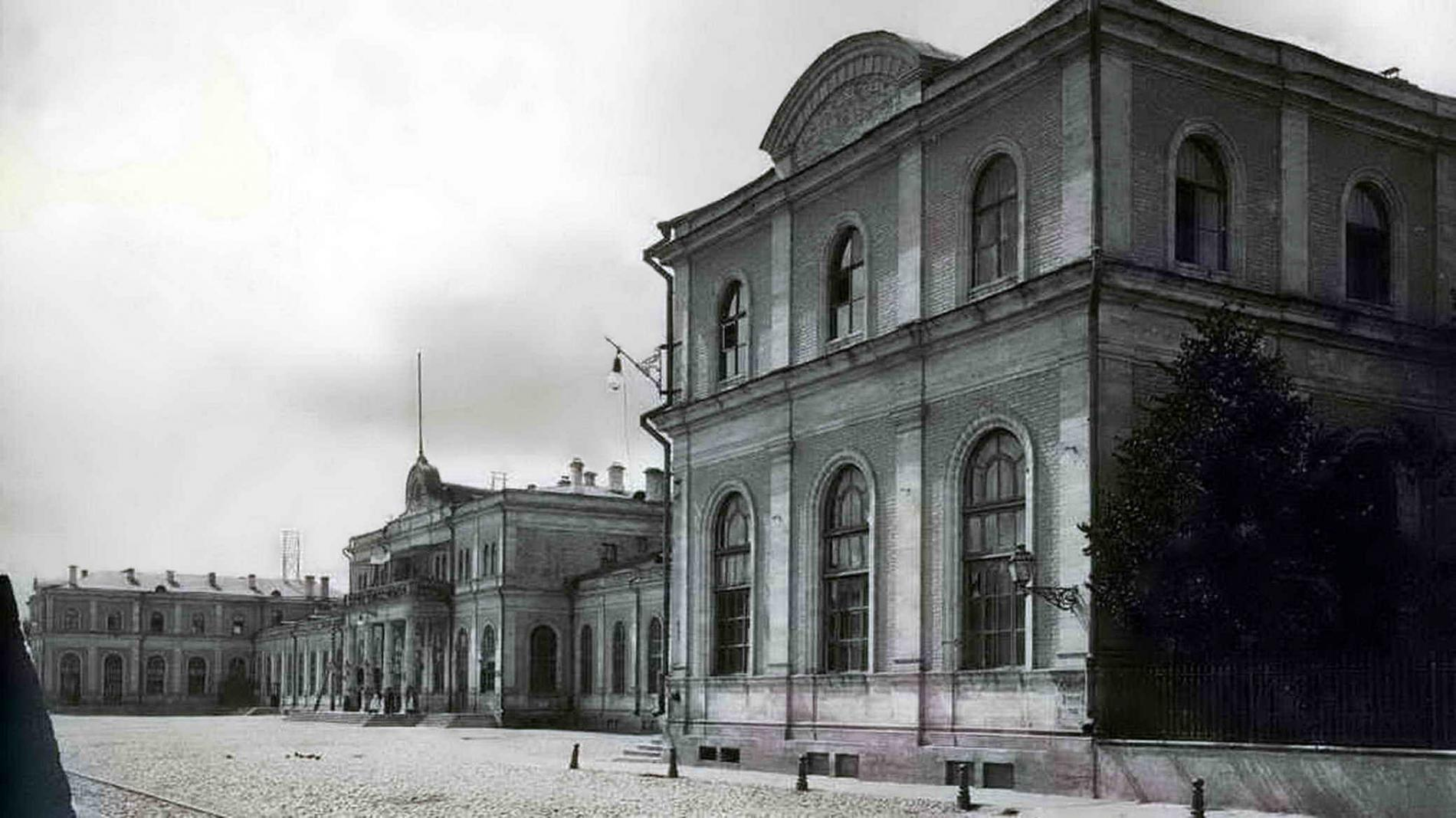
Moscow railway station in the 19th century

The station in Nizhny Novgorod was built in 1862, when the Moscow-Vladimir railway was extended. On August 2, 1862, traffic was opened on the section Vladimir - Nizhny Novgorod. The station became the final point for the Moscow-Nizhny Novgorod railway. It consisted of three two-storey buildings connected by passages to the lobby in the center, waiting rooms, mail, telegraph, buffets and restaurants. A clock was installed on the central tower. Inside the building walls were decorated with mosaic panels on heroic themes.

In 1894, the imperial (tsardom) pavilion was built for the arrival of imperial persons in the city. The architect Dmitry Chichagov, a representative of the famous dynasty of Russian architects, designed both the building and the interiors. The hall of the pavilion was decorated with a large portrait of Nicholas II and a carved fireplace made of white Italian marble. A telephone was installed for important talks. The pavilion received the emperor twice: in 1896, during the All-Russia Exhibition and in 1913, during the celebration of the Romanov Tercentenary. During the 1905 revolution, it was captured by rebellious workers and held for some time. After the October Revolution of 1917, the Committee of the Bolsheviks of Kanavino and the medical institution of railway were located in the building at different times.

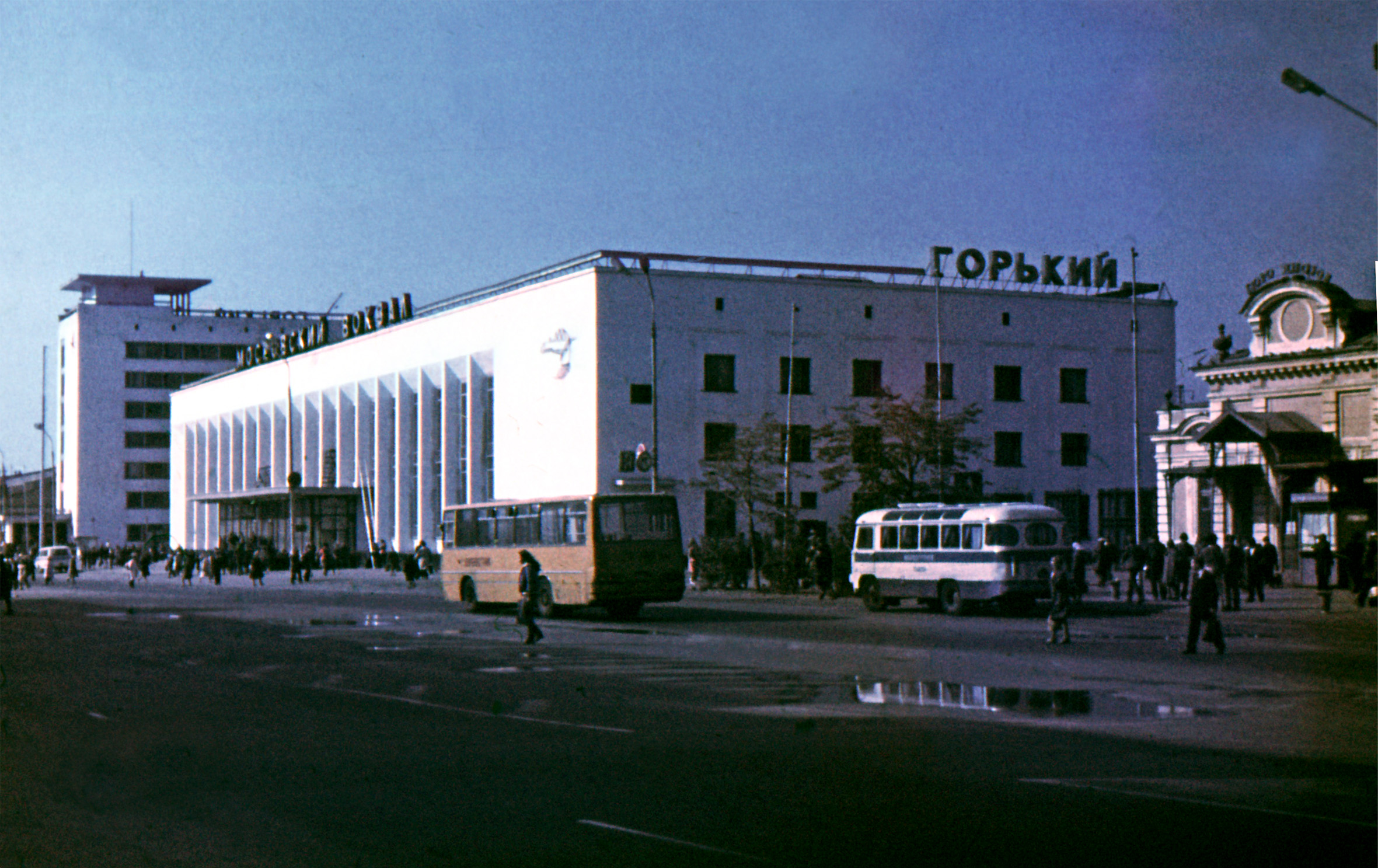
Gorky city. Moscow railway station 1982

The Soviet government for a long time kept the old building. During the World War II, the Moscow railway station, along with the Kazan railway station, became an important strategic object. For the connection of the two stations between them were laid railway tracks through the cargo port on Spit and Kanavinsky bridge. German pilots tried several times to bombing the station, however, it was to no avail. Bombs was fell on Revolution Square and near to the modern building of the Central Department Store. After winning the war, trainloads arrived at the train station with victorious soldiers.

In the 1960s, the station building was completely rebuilt to give it a so-called “civilian look”. The entire historical facade was destroyed. Inside, the station also underwent major changes: the “pre-revolutionary” mosaics were replaced by Soviet ones in the spirit of the 20th century, the waiting rooms and many other rooms were rebuilt. In the center of the hall was placed a giant chandelier, made in the Netherlands, from a variety of metal panels. It has become a symbol of the renewed Soviet station and a meeting place for millions of passengers.

In 1985, after the launch of the metro, exits to the long passage to Moskovskaya metro station were equipped in the terminal building.

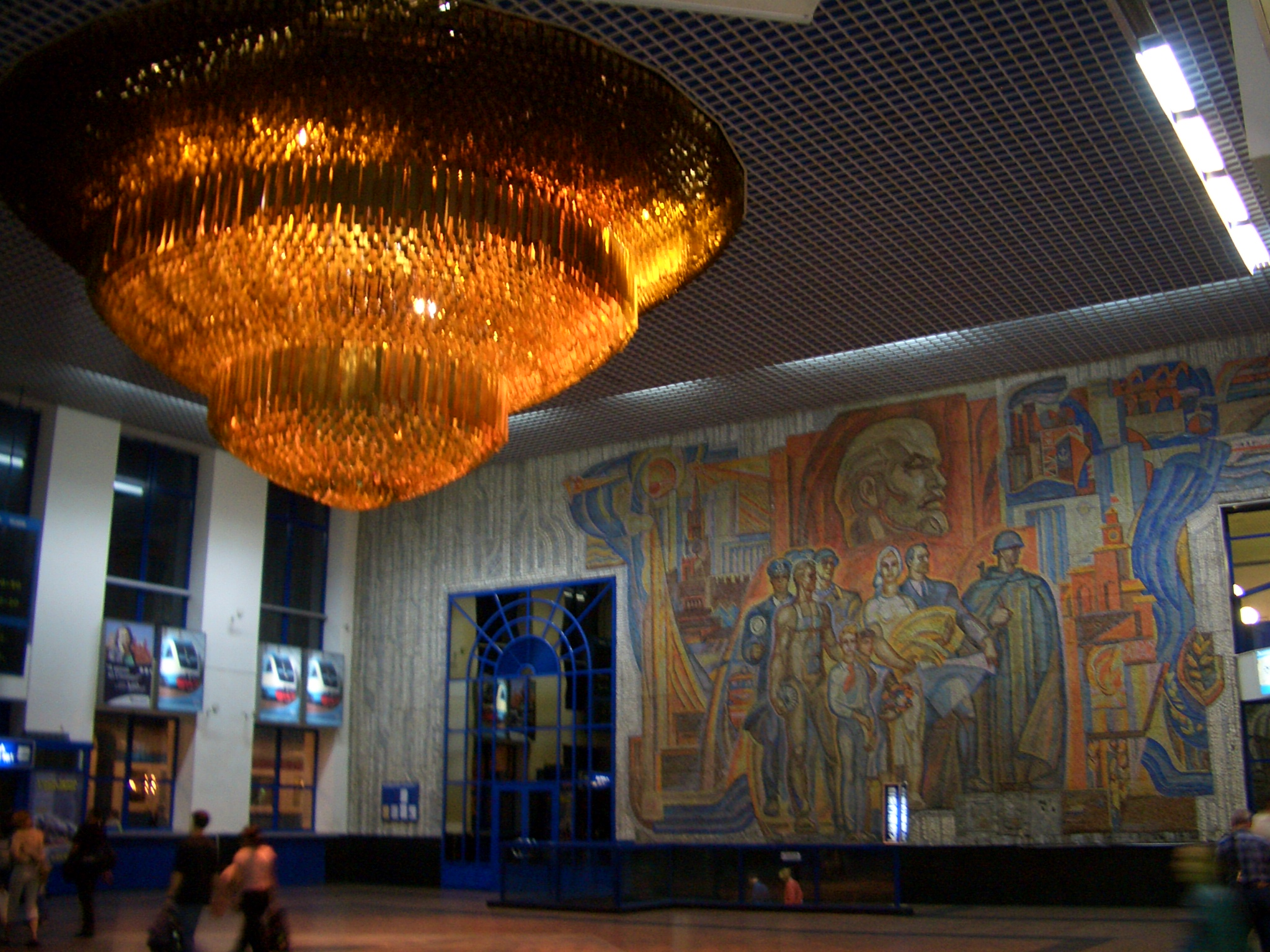
Chandelier inside the old station

Since 2002, the station has been modernized, equipped with terminals for the automatic check of tickets, and construction of sheds over the platforms. From June 2017, the station was closed for renovation and opened only on April 28, 2018.

At the time of the reconstruction, the exit of passengers to platforms to long-distance trains and to electric trains was carried out through suburban tunnels. After the reconstruction, an updated terminal appeared, equipped and rebuilt in the spirit of the 21st century. In the waiting rooms there are cameras and shelves for charging mobile devices with combination locks. The giant chandelier was dismantled and sent to storage. Only two mosaic panels on the side walls inside the building remained from the Soviet era.

March 30, 2010 Gorky-Moskovsky station was renamed the modern name of Nizhny Novgorod-Moskovsky. On July 1 of the same year, the name of the Gorky-Moskovsky railway station was changed to Nizhny Novgorod according to the order of the President of Russian Railways JSC Vladimir Yakunin. But the name at the station itself was changed only in April 2014 from Moscow Railway Station to Railway Station, as only by that time it had been financed.

== Services ==
The station serves the Gorky Railway and has four suburban traffic directions: Shakhunya, Vladimir, Arzamas and the Zavolzhye. Long-distance trains have directions to Moscow, St. Petersburg, Kirov, Kazan and Novgorod.

=== High-speed rail ===
Train number	Train name	Direction	Operated by
701/702; 703/704; 705/706; 707/708; 709/710	Lastochka (rus: Ласточка)	(Russia) Nizhny Novgorod (Moskovsky) - (Russia) Moscow (Kursky)	(Russia) Russian Railways

- Note: Sapsan is now replaced with Talgo Strizh since 2015.

=== City Rail ===
From June 24, 2013, the first line of the City Rail (the analogue of the German S-Bahn, London Overground or Paris RER) was opened, which connects Sormovsky City District and railway station. It passes through quarters in which there is no metro and is its alternative. Trains run less frequently than on the subway, but more often than on suburban routes. During rush hours, the first-line train starts every 20–30 minutes. In 2018, a second line was opened connecting the station and the Prospekt Gagarina Station. It connects several areas and part of the suburb, because of which it has different tariff zones.

#	Line	Route	Number of stations
1	Sormovskaya	Nizhny Novgorod railway station – Pochinki	7
2	Priokskaya	Nizhny Novgorod railway station – Prospekt Gagarina	12
Total:			18

== Gallery ==
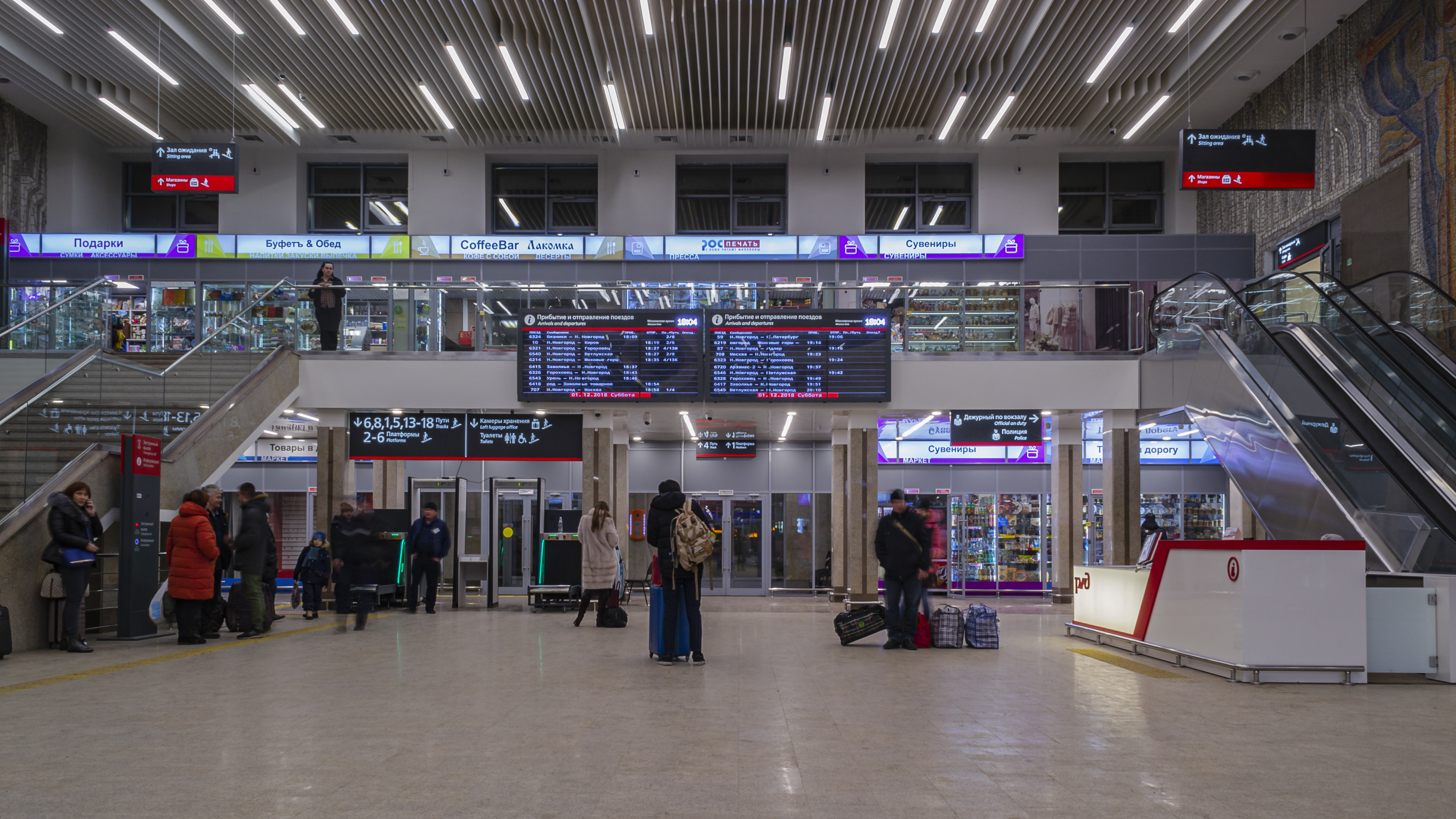
Station hall

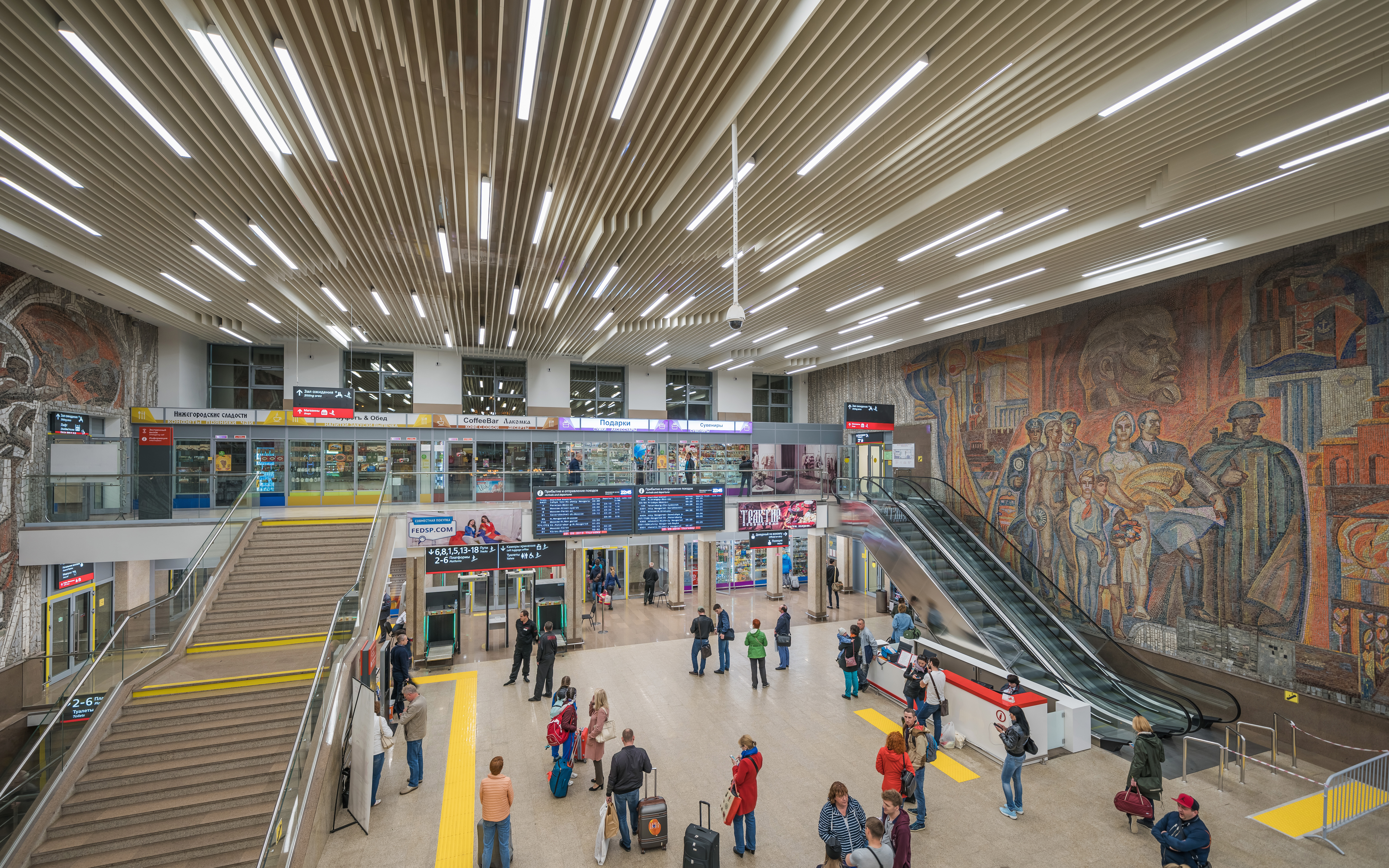
Station hall from the second floor

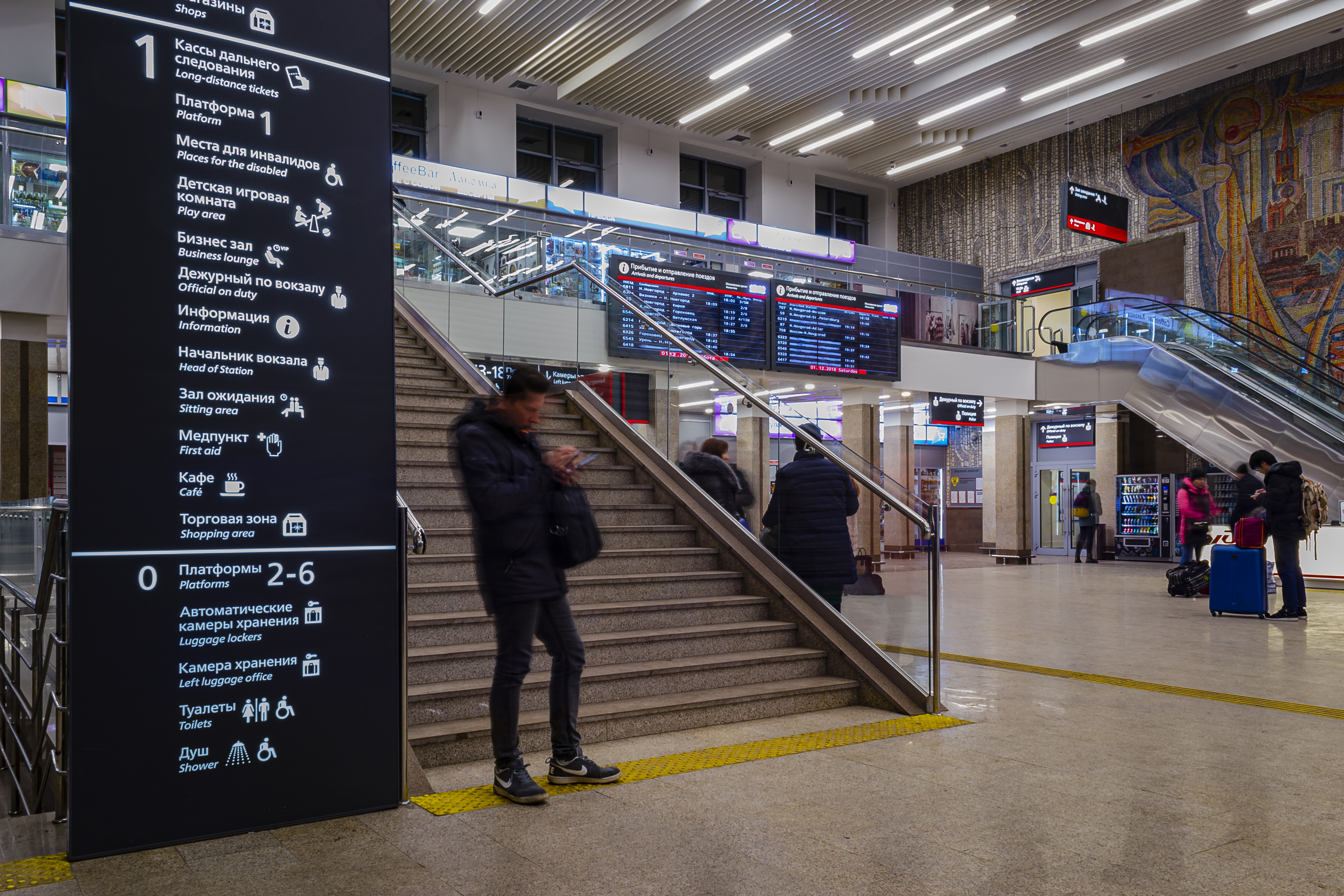
Information signs and signs in the station hall

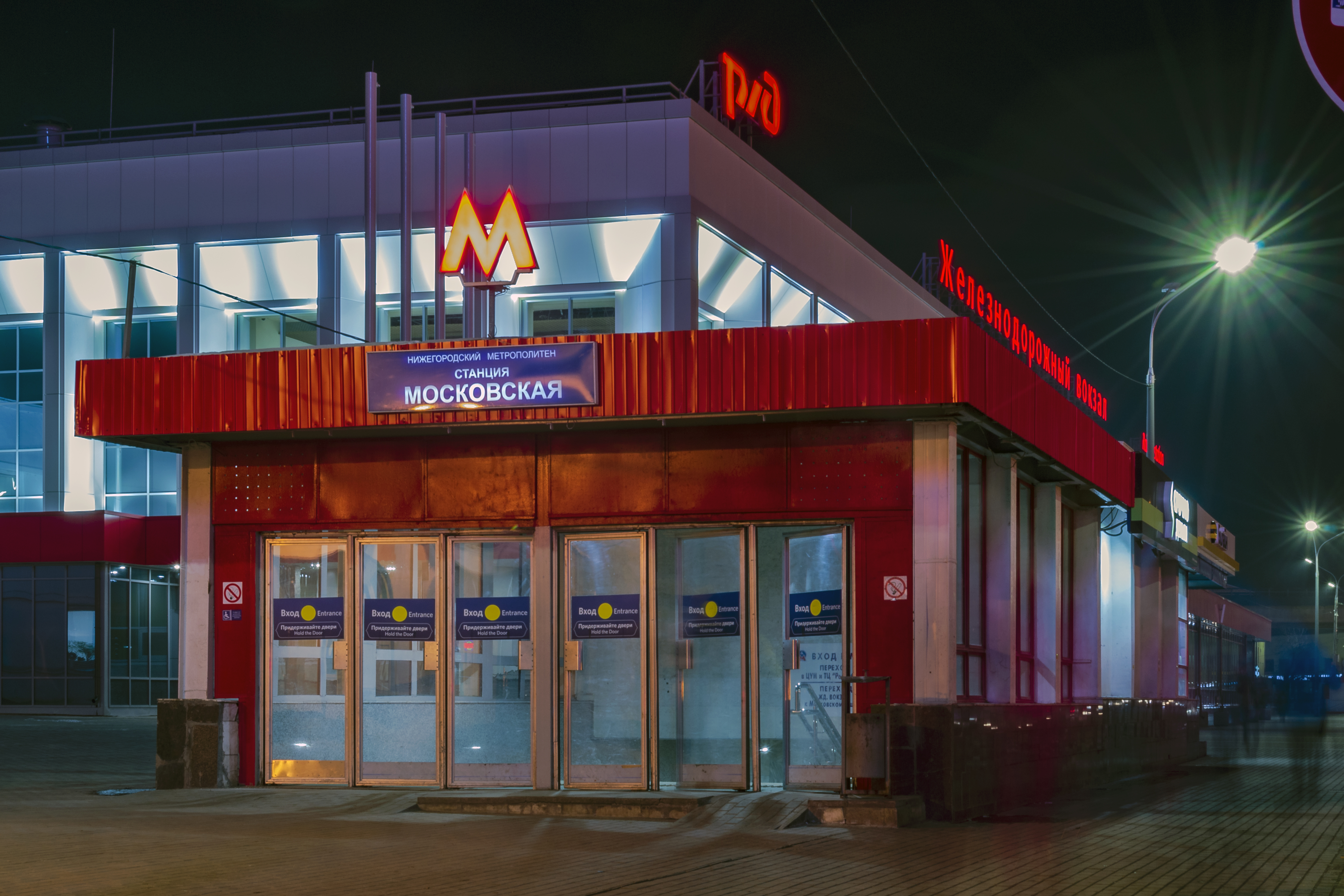
The station building at night and the entrance to the Moskovskaya metro station

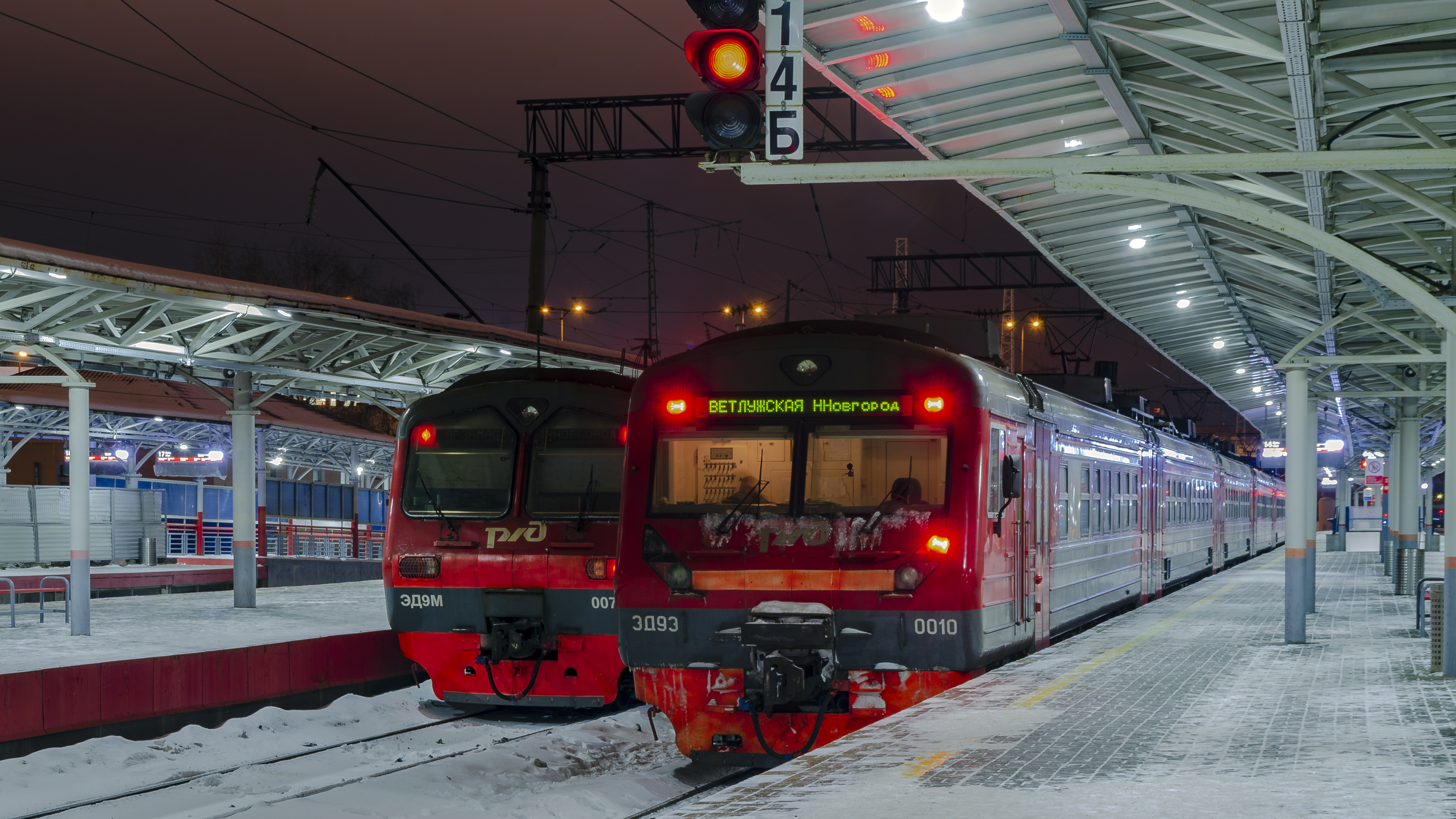
ED9E “Nizhny Novgorod-Vetluzhskaya” high-speed electric train on the 5th platform

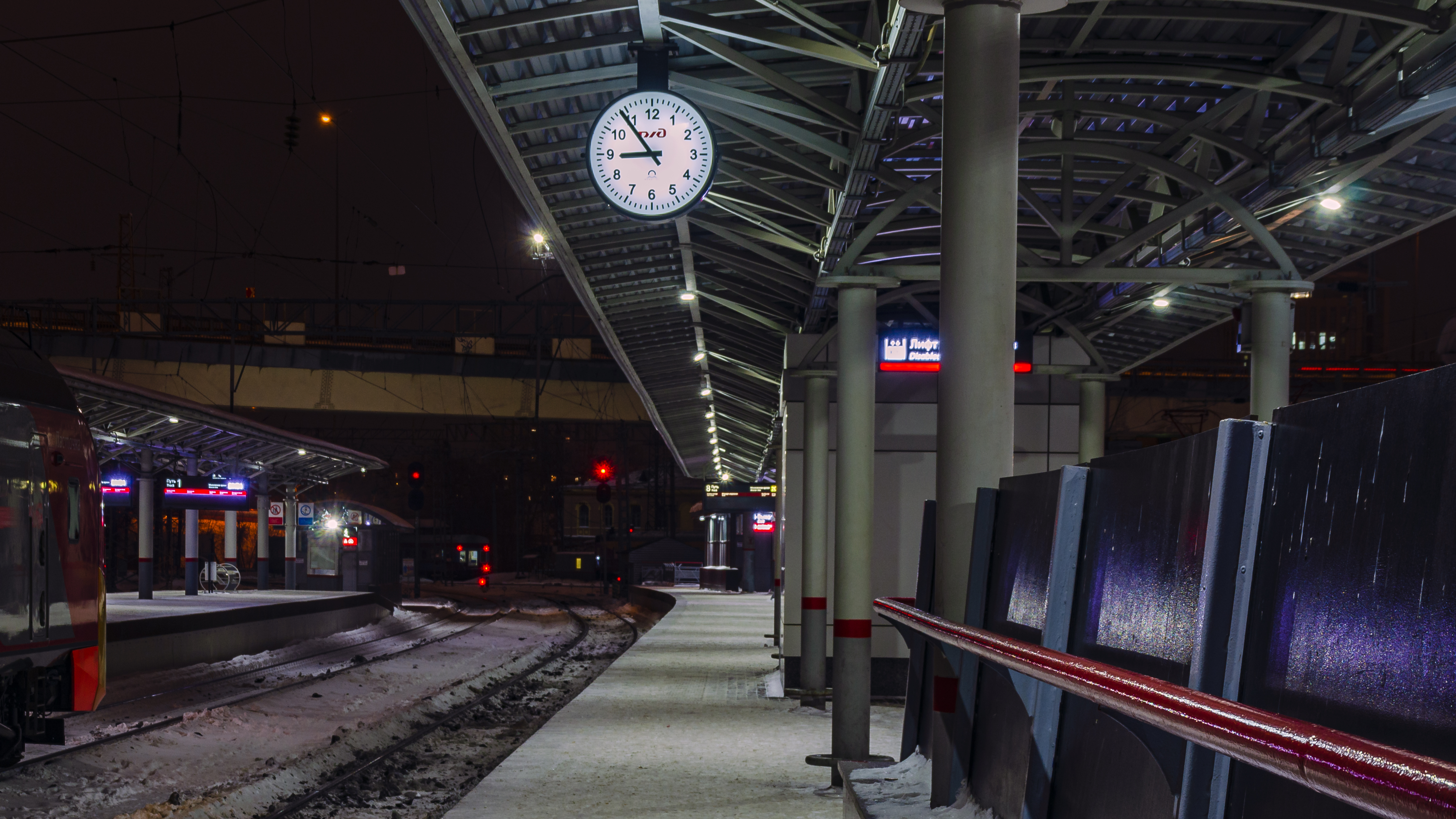
Railway clock on the platform

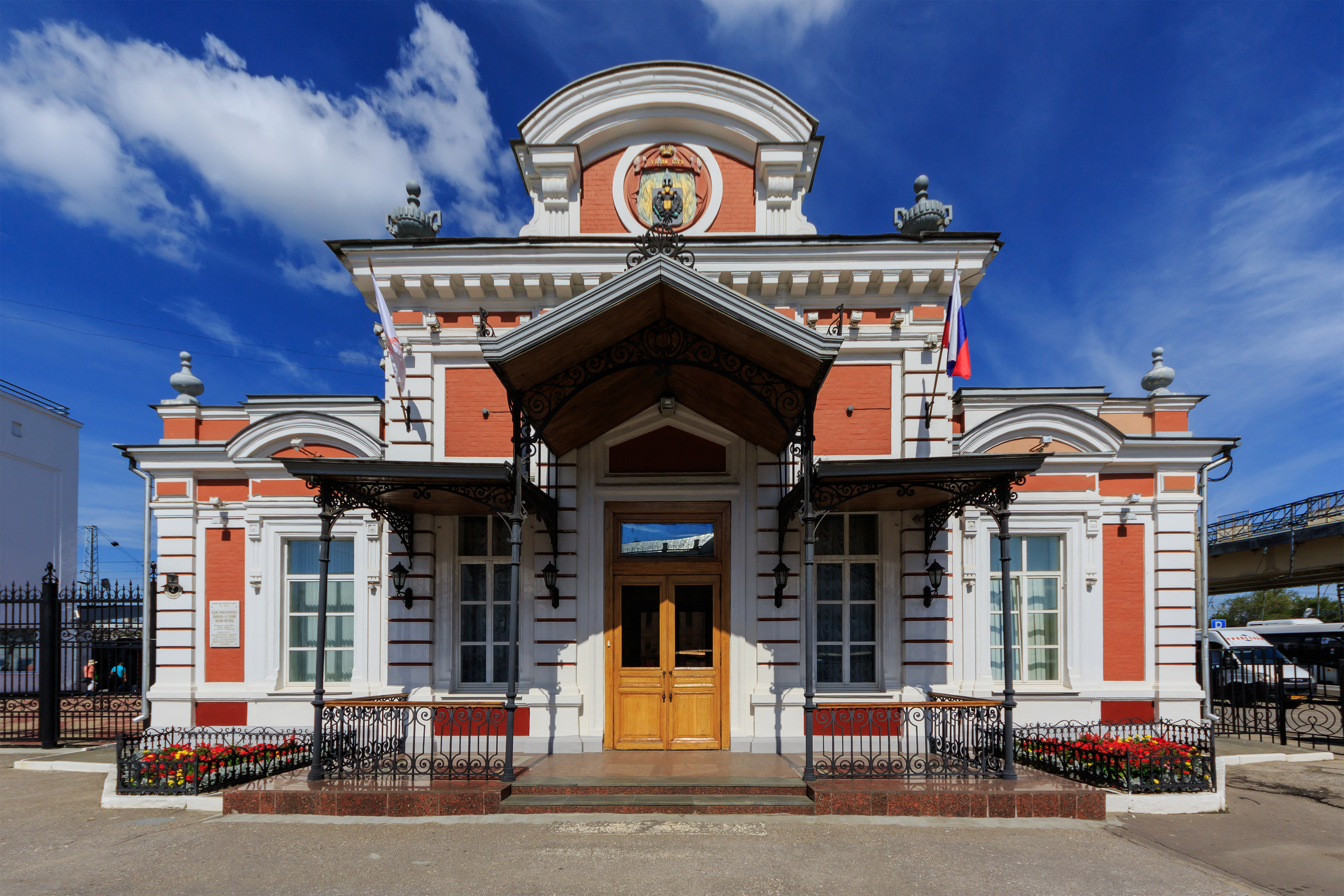
Former Imperial Pavilion

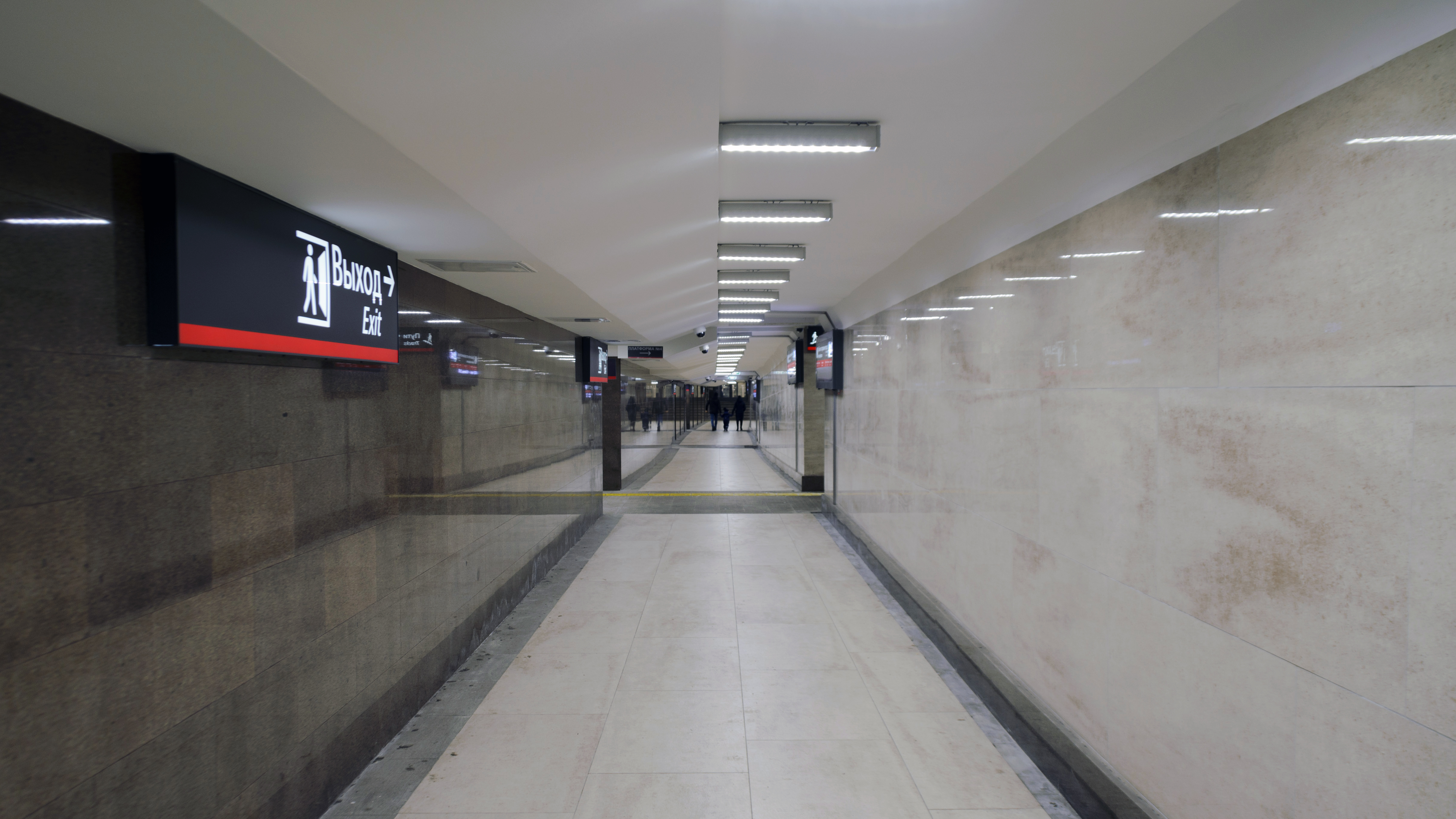
Pedestrian underpass between platforms and the railway station

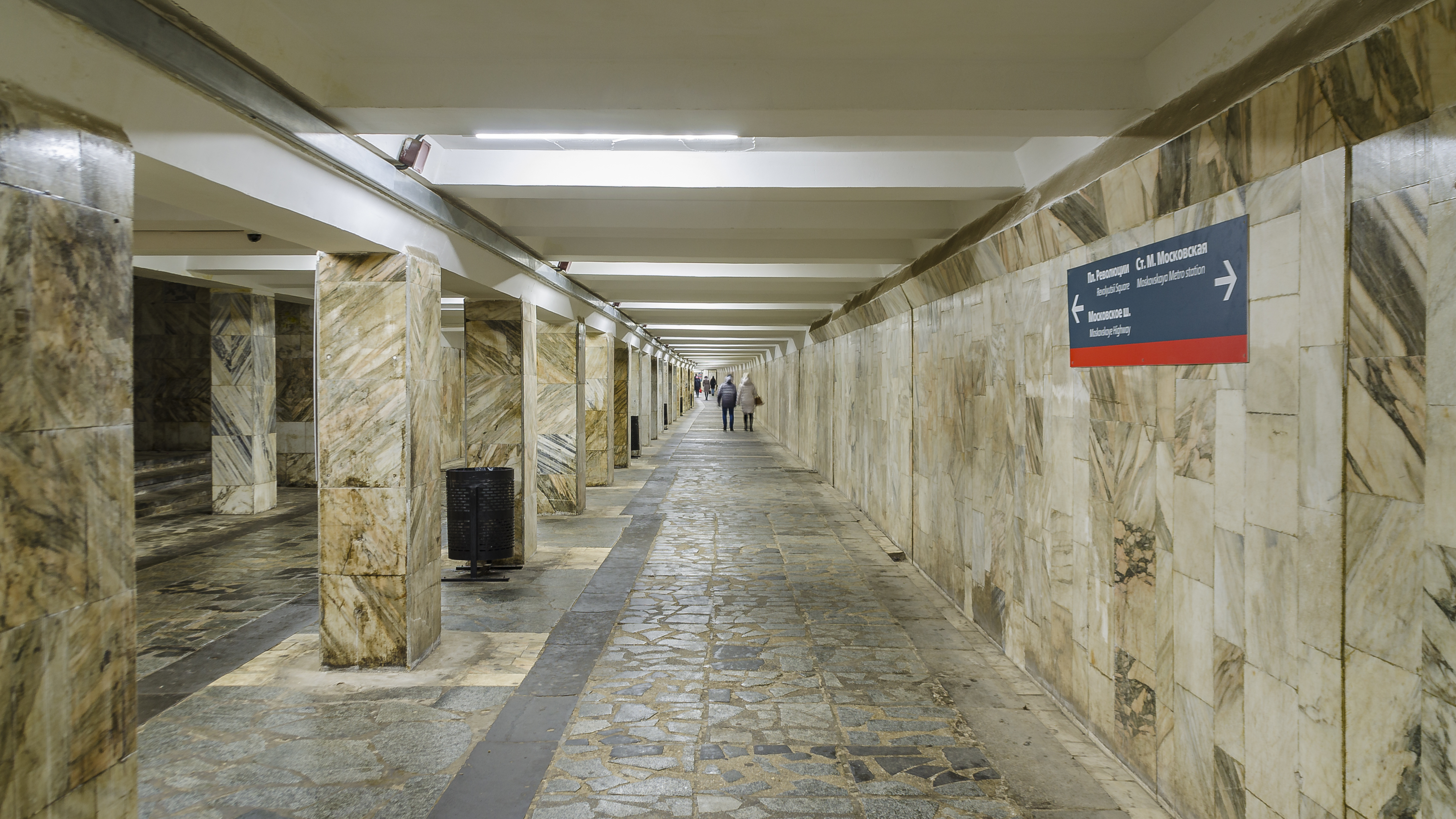
Pedestrian underpass between Moskovskaya metro station, railway station, several platforms and exits to several streets
