= Strelka (Nizhny Novgorod Metro) =

Nizhny Novgorod Metro Station

Strelka Стрелка
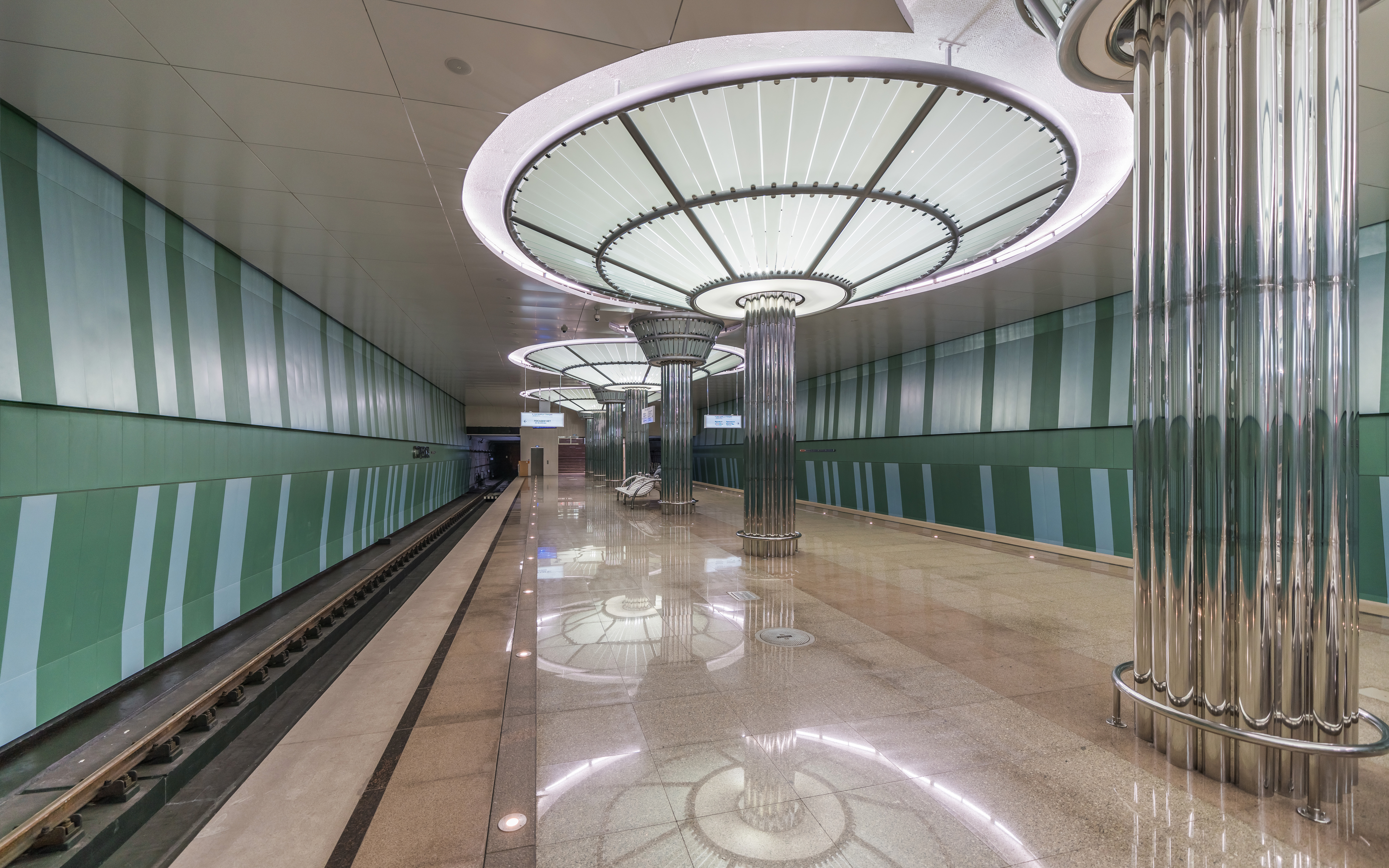
- Strelka metro station

General information
- Coordinates: 56.334976°N 43.949294°E
- System: Two-span, shallow-column station
- Line: Line 2
- Platforms: 1
- Tracks: 2 (just one is used)
- Connections: 7, 41, 57, 66, 69

Construction
- Structure type: Island
- Depth: 12

History
- Opened: June 12, 2018

Services
Preceding station	Nizhny Novgorod Metro	Following station
Terminus	Line 2	Moskovskaya towards Burevestnik
Location

Strelka (Russian: Стрелка) is a station of the Nizhny Novgorod Metro which was opened on 12 June 2018. It is the northern terminus of the Sormovsko–Meshcherskaya line.

The station is located near Nizhny Novgorod Stadium, one of the venues for the 2018 FIFA World Cup. The name, which means “spit” (of land) in Russian, refers to the Spit of Nizhny Novgorod at the confluence of the Oka and Volga rivers.

== History ==
Although plans for a northern extension of the line have existed for some time, there had been little progress. Construction toward Yarmarka Station started in 1993, but was suspended in 1996 because of a lack of funding. The announcement that Russia won the bidding for the 2018 World Cup changed the city’s priorities. In 2012, the city announced that, with the construction of the new stadium in the Strelka area, it would also build a new Metro station for easy access of the fans.

== See also ==
- List of Nizhny Novgorod metro stations
