= Moskovsky Settlement =

Moskovsky Московский
- Settlement
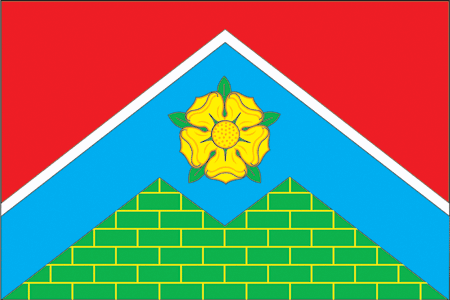
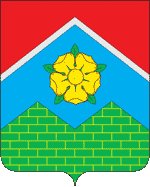
- Flag Coat of arms
- Moskovsky Settlement within the federal city of Moscow
- Location of Moskovsky
- Location of Moskovsky Moskovsky (Moscow)
- Coordinates: 55°37′10.17″N 37°23′10.38″E
- Country: Russia
- Federal subject: Moscow
- Founded: 28 February 2005

Administrative status
  - Subordinated to: Novomoskovsky Administrative Okrug
- Time zone: UTC+3 (MSK)
- Postal code(s): 142784
- OKTMO ID: 45952000
- Website: www.adm-moskovsky.ru

Moskovsky Settlement (Russian: Поселение Моско́вский) is a settlement (both municipal and administrative unit in Moscow) in Novomoskovsky Administrative Okrug of Moscow. It was established in 2005 as Moskovsky urban settlement in Leninsky municipal raion of Moscow Oblast and now it consists of the town of Moskovsky and eight other inhabited localities of the abolished Moskovsky rural district. On July 1, 2012 Moskovsky Settlement was transferred to the city of Moscow and became a part of Novomoskovsky Administrative Okrug.

== Inhabited localities ==
The structure of the settlement includes nine inhabited localities:

Locality type	Name	Population	OKATO
village	Govorovo	151	46 228 823 005
settlement	Settlement of Institute of Poliomyelitis	1220	46 228 823 002
village	Kartmazovo	99	46 228 823 007
village	Lapshinka	49	46 228 823 003
village	Meshkovo	72	46 228 823 004
town	Moskovsky	15755	46 228 505
village	Rumyantsevo	298	46 228 823 006
village	Salaryevo	187	46 228 823 008
settlement	Settlement of Ulyanovsky Forest Park	17	46 228 823 010
