= Chkalovskaya (Nizhny Novgorod Metro) =

Metro station in Nizhny Novgorod, Russia

Chkalovskaya Чкаловская
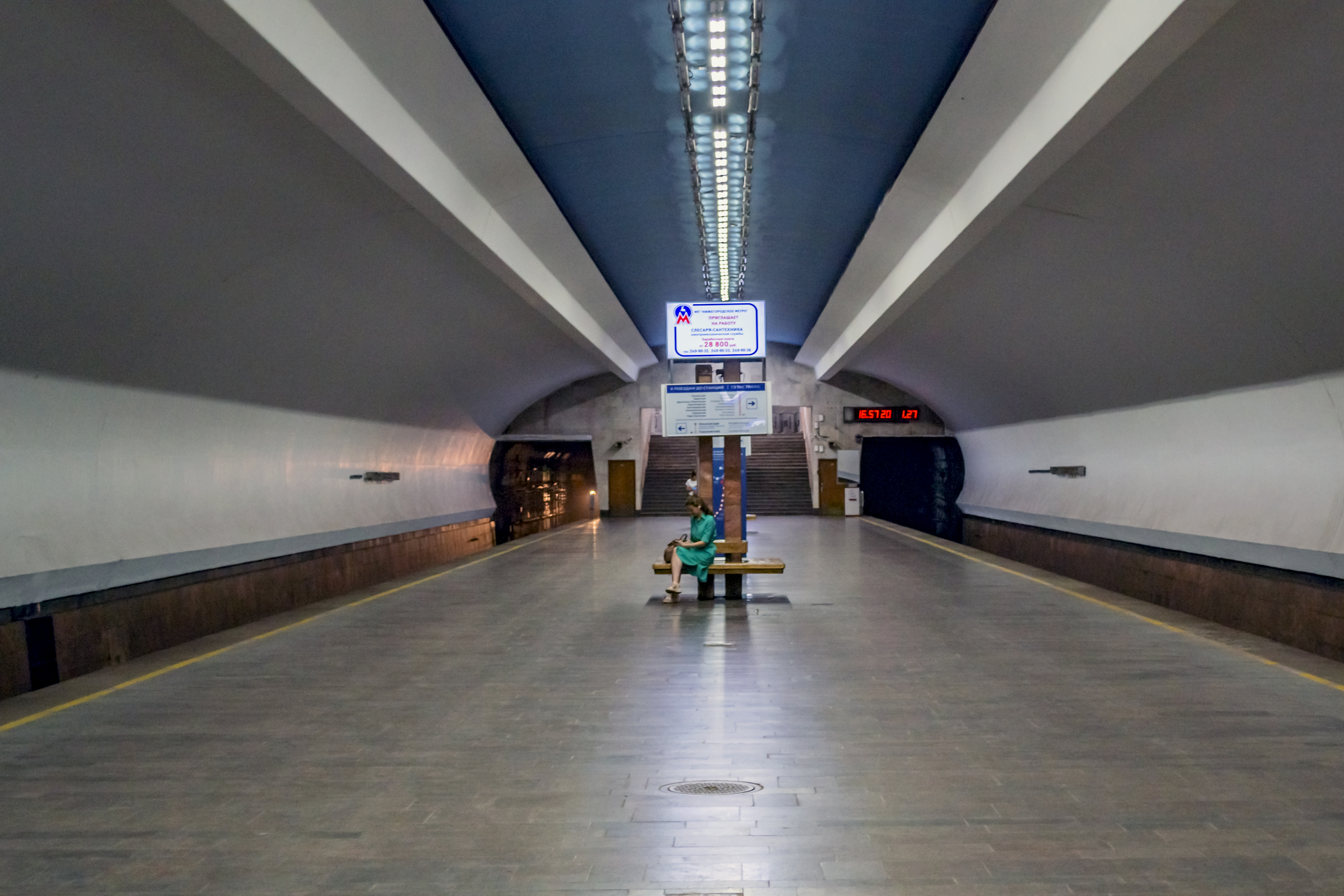

General information
- Coordinates: 56°18′41″N 43°56′16″E
- System: Nizhny Novgorod Metro station
- Line: Line 1
- Platforms: 1
- Tracks: 2
- Connections: 1, 3, 27, 417; 37

Construction
- Structure type: Single-span, shallow station

History
- Opened: 20 November 1985

Services
Preceding station	Nizhny Novgorod Metro	Following station
Moskovskaya towards Gorkovskaya	Line 1	Leninskaya towards Park Kultury
Location

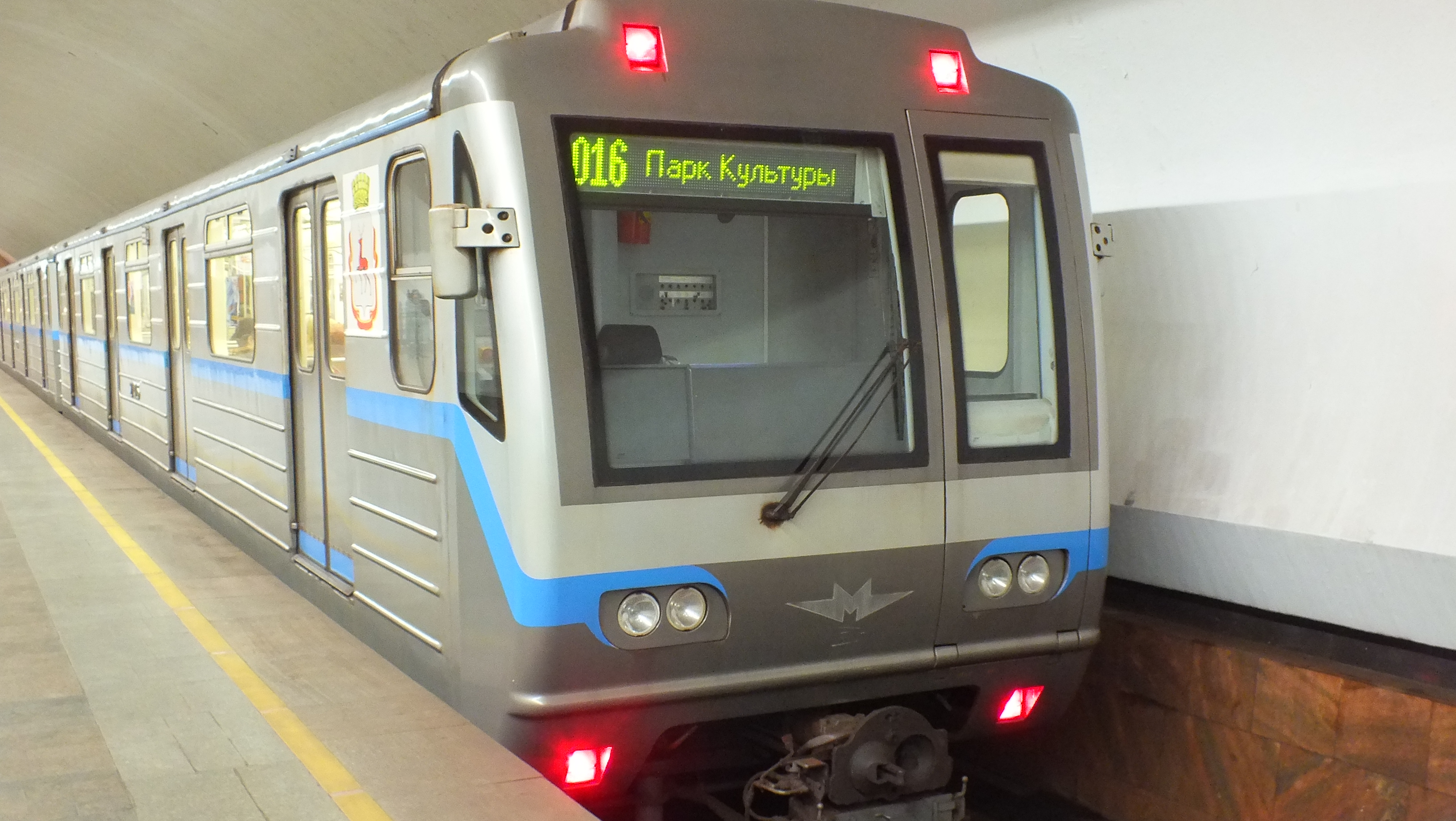
81-717.6/714.6 train on station

Chkalovskaya (Russian: Чкаловская) is a station on the Avtozavodskaya line of the Nizhny Novgorod Metro. It opened on 20 November 1985 and was one of six initial stations of the Metro.

Chkalovskaya is named for Ulitsa Chkalova which intersects at Ulitsa Oktyabrskoy Revolyutsii. The street is named for the test pilot Valery Chkalov.
