= Komsomolskaya (Nizhny Novgorod Metro) =

Nizhny Novgorod Metro Station

Komsomolskaya Комсомольская
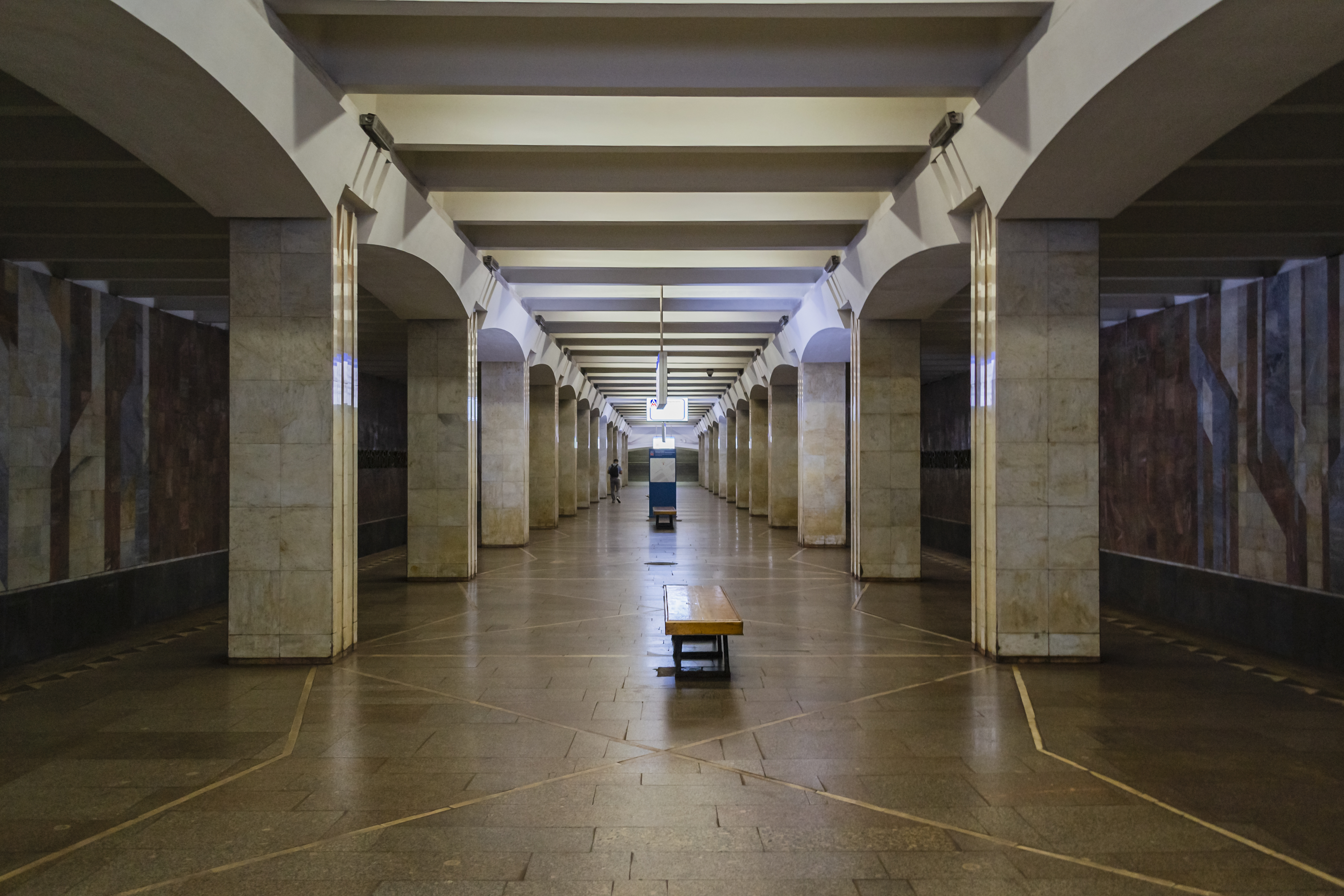

General information
- Location: Avtozavodsky District; Nizhny Novgorod; Russia
- Coordinates: 56°15′09″N 43°53′24″E
- System: Nizhny Novgorod Metro station
- Line: Line 1
- Platforms: 1
- Tracks: 2
- Connections: 8, 22, 417; 15, 20, 31, 33, 40, 54, 56, 68, 77; 2, 11, 12

Construction
- Structure type: Three-span, shallow-column station

History
- Opened: 8 August 1987

Services
Preceding station	Nizhny Novgorod Metro	Following station
Avtozavodskaya towards Gorkovskaya	Line 1	Kirovskaya towards Park Kultury
Location

Komsomolskaya (Russian: Комсомольская) is a station on the Avtozavodskaya line of the Nizhny Novgorod Metro. The station opened on 8 August 1987 along with Avtozavodskaya station. Like Avtozavodskaya, it is adjacent to the massive GAZ automobile factory in the Avtozavodsky district of Nizhny Novgorod. The station's name comes from the Komsomolskaya checkpoint of the factory.
