= Zarechnaya (Nizhny Novgorod Metro) =

Nizhny Novgorod Metro Station

Zarechnaya Заречная
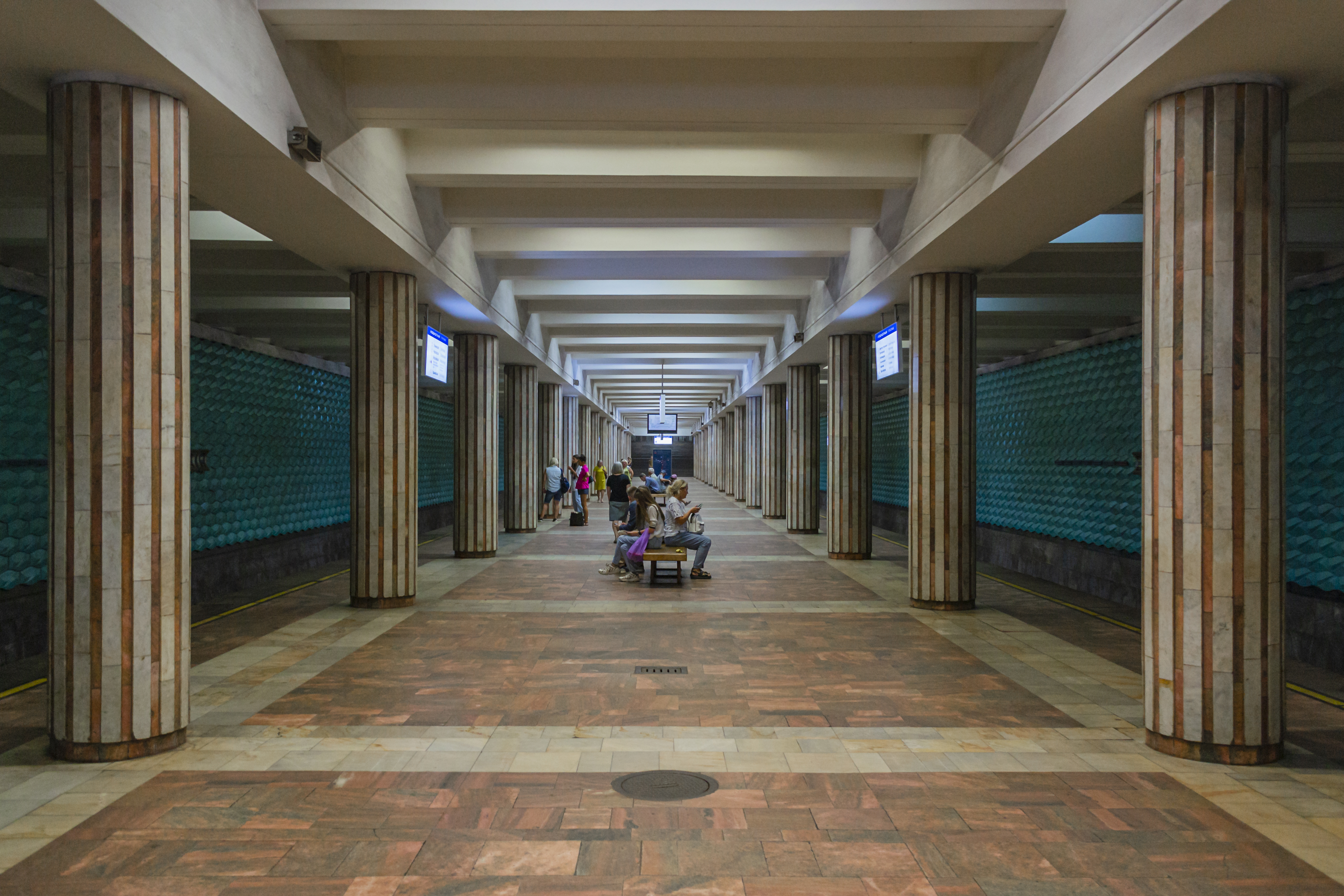

General information
- Location: Leninsky District, Prospekt Lenina and Zarechny Bulvar; Nizhny Novgorod; Russia
- Coordinates: 56°17′9″N 43°55′41″E
- System: Nizhny Novgorod Metro station
- Line: Line 1
- Platforms: 1
- Tracks: 2
- Connections: 19, 23A, 40, 56, 58, 66

Construction
- Structure type: Three-span, shallow-column station

History
- Opened: 20 November 1985

Services
Preceding station	Nizhny Novgorod Metro	Following station
Leninskaya towards Gorkovskaya	Line 1	Dvigatel Revolyutsii towards Park Kultury
Location

Zarechnaya (Russian: Заречная) is a station on the Avtozavodskaya line of the Nizhny Novgorod Metro. It opened on 20 November 1985 as one of the initial six station of the Metro. It was the deepest station in Nizhny Novgorod Metro from 1985 until 2012.

== Location ==
The station is in the Leninsky district at the intersection of Prospekt Lenina and Zarechny Bulvar. The station is named for Zarechny Bulvar.

== Structure ==
The lobby walls are decorated with unusual embossed tiles, blue and hexagonal shape, imitating waves. The station is shallow and has round white marble columns. The floor is paved with light-brown granite, symbolising river sand, and white marble. The walls are decorated with panels with pictures of the underwater world and of Nizhny Novgorod history.

== See also ==
- List of Nizhny Novgorod metro stations
