= Dvigatel Revolyutsii (Nizhny Novgorod Metro) =

Nizhny Novgorod Metro Station

Dvigatel' Revolyutsii Двигатель Революции
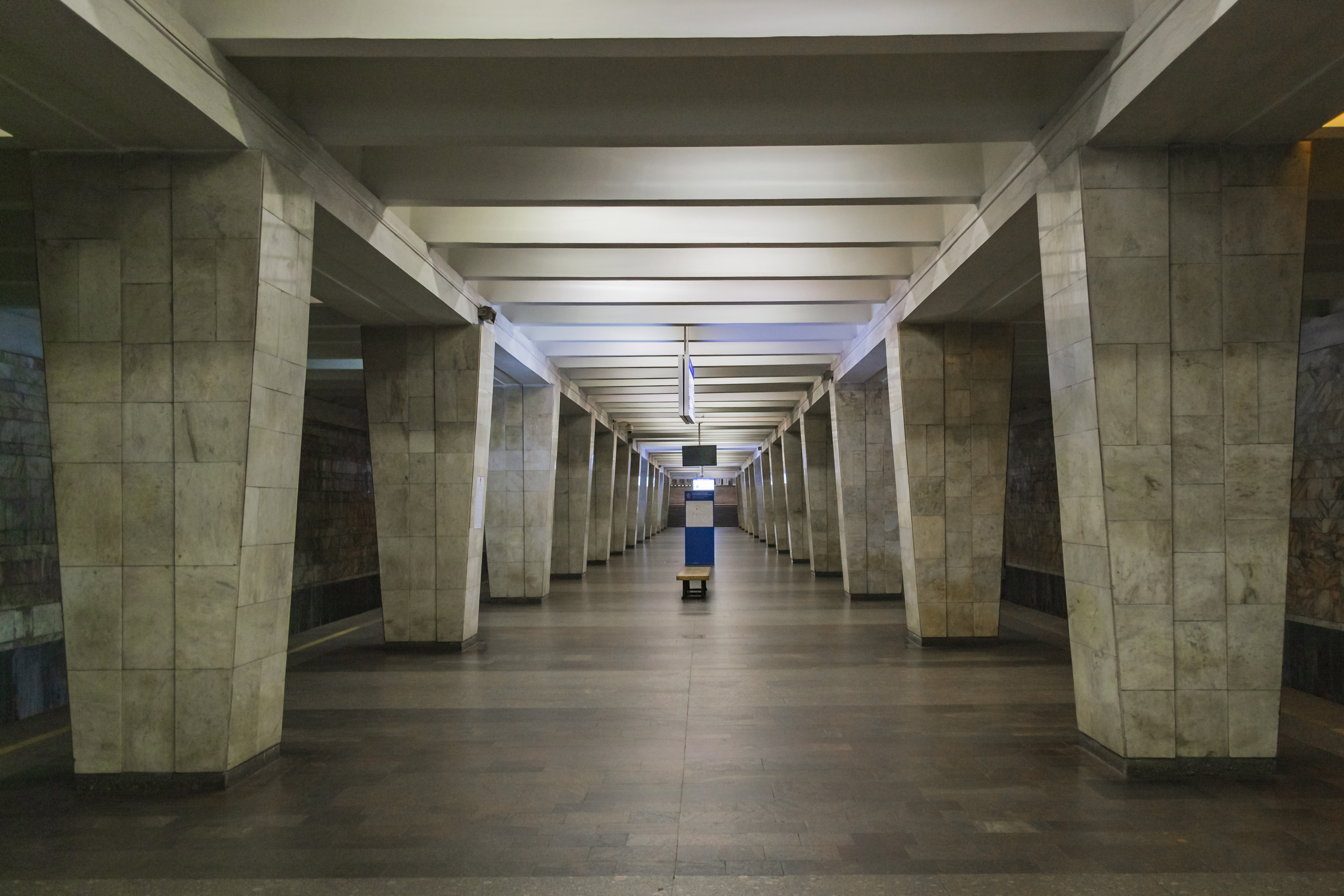

General information
- Location: Leninsky District; Nizhny Novgorod; Russia
- Coordinates: 56°16′33″N 43°55′14″E
- System: Nizhny Novgorod Metro station
- Line: Line 1
- Platforms: 1
- Tracks: 2
- Connections: 40, 56, 58, 66

Construction
- Structure type: Three-span, shallow column station

History
- Opened: 20 November 1985

Services
| Preceding station | Nizhny Novgorod Metro | Following station |
|---|---|---|
| Zarechnaya towards Gorkovskaya | Line 1 | Proletarskaya towards Park Kultury |
Location

Dvigatel' Revolyutsii (Russian: Двигатель Революции) is a station on the Avtozavodskaya line of the Nizhny Novgorod Metro. It opened on 20 November 1985 as one of the six original stations of the Metro.

It is in the Ippodromny section of Leninsky District of Nizhny Novgorod. The name Dvigatel’ Revolyutsii means “Engine of the Revolution” in Russian and comes from the Soviet-era name of the nearby diesel engine factory. The station retained its name although the factory was renamed RUMO in 1993.

== Incidents ==
On 16 June 2014, the station sustained a flood after a nearby water main burst. Service was restored after several hours and there were no reported injuries.
