= Leninskaya (Nizhny Novgorod Metro) =

Nizhny Novgorod Metro Station

Leninskaya Ленинская
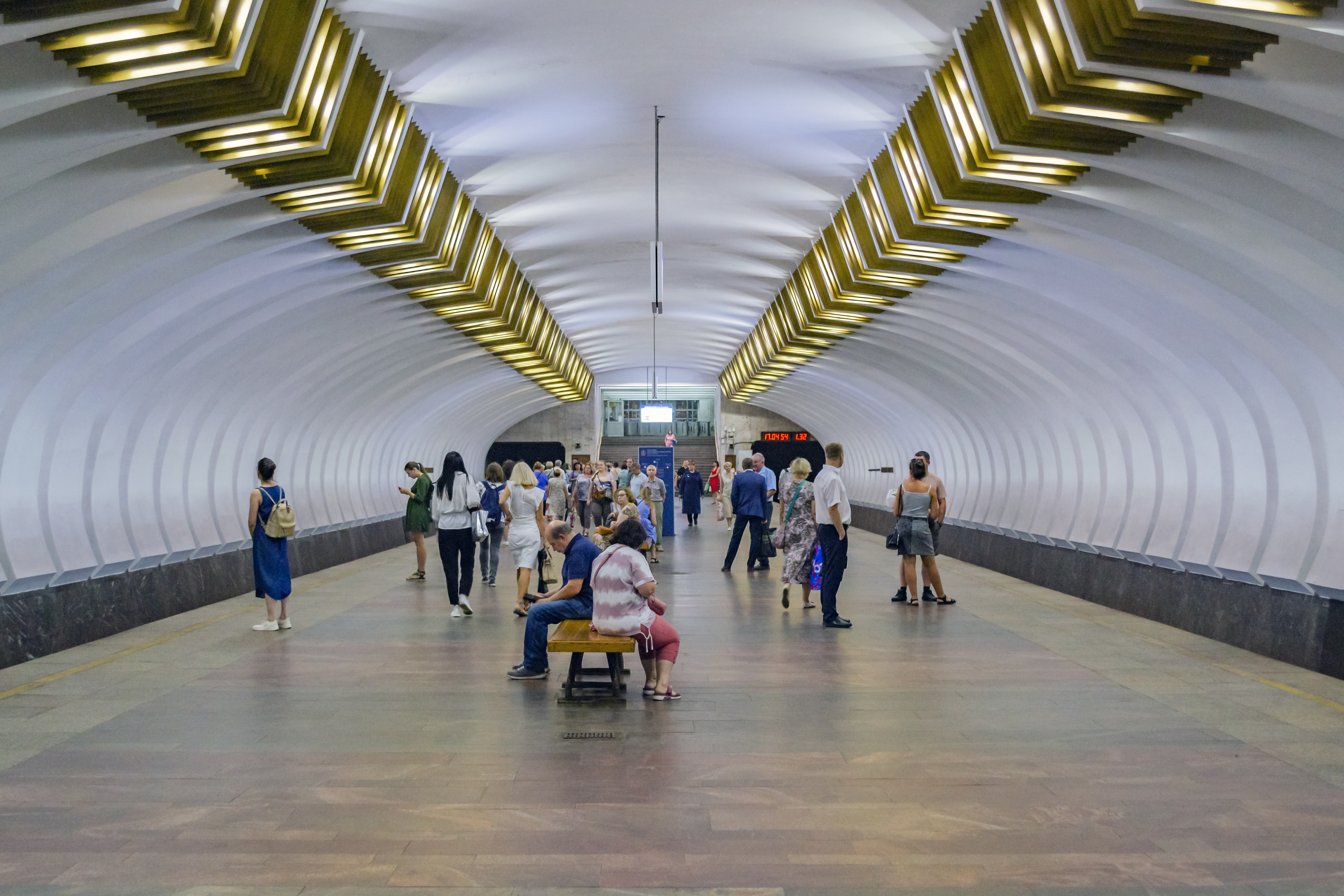

General information
- Location: Leninsky District; Nizhny Novgorod; Russia
- Coordinates: 56°17′52″N 43°56′15″E
- System: Nizhny Novgorod Metro station
- Line: Line 1
- Platforms: 1
- Tracks: 2
- Connections: 40, 58, 66

Construction
- Structure type: Single-vault shallow station

History
- Opened: 20 November 1985

Services
| Preceding station | Nizhny Novgorod Metro | Following station |
|---|---|---|
| Chkalovskaya towards Gorkovskaya | Line 1 | Zarechnaya towards Park Kultury |
Location

Leninskaya (Russian: Ленинская) is a station on the Avtozavodskaya line of the Nizhny Novgorod Metro. The station opened on 20 November 1985 and was one of six initial stations of the Metro.

The station is located at Leninsky district of Nizhny Novgorod on the northern end of Prospekt Lenina where the road begins.
