= Proletarskaya (Nizhny Novgorod Metro) =

Nizhny Novgorod Metro Station

Proletarskaya Пролетарская
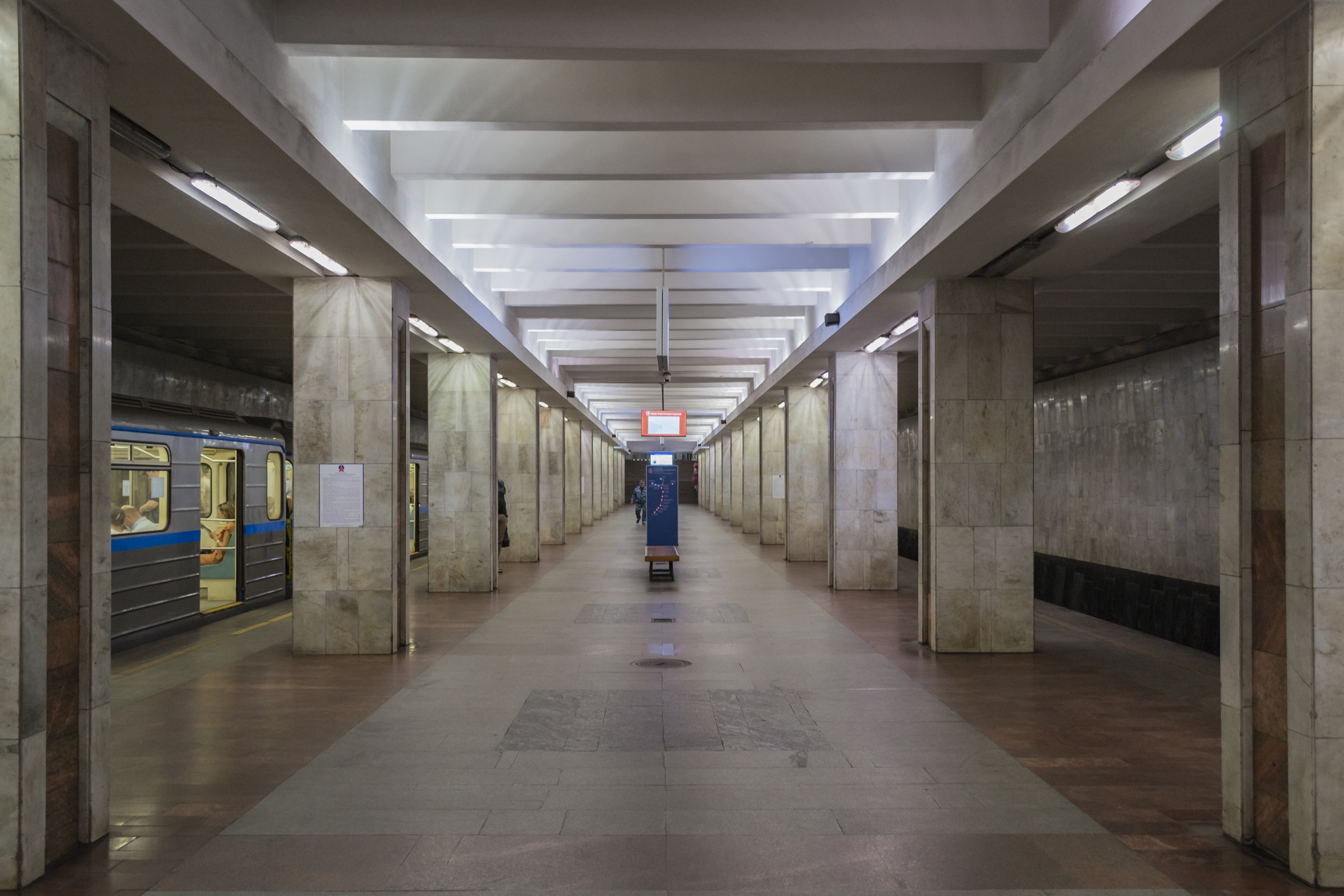

General information
- Location: Leninsky District; Nizhny Novgorod; Russia
- Coordinates: 56°15′56″N 43°54′45″E
- System: Nizhny Novgorod Metro station
- Line: Line 1
- Platforms: 1
- Tracks: 2
- Connections: 8, 417; 31, 40, 56, 58, 64, 65, 66, 68, 69, 73, 77, 85; 2, 11, 12

Construction
- Structure type: Three-span, shallow-column station

History
- Opened: 20 November 1985

Services
Preceding station	Nizhny Novgorod Metro	Following station
Dvigatel Revolyutsii towards Gorkovskaya	Line 1	Avtozavodskaya towards Park Kultury
Location

Proletarskaya (Russian: Пролетарская) is a station on the Avtozavodskaya line of the Nizhny Novgorod Metro. It opened on 20 November 1985 and was one of six initial stations of the Metro.

It is in the Leninsky district of Nizhny Novgorod, Russia. From its opening until 1987, when Avtozavodskaya station opened, it was the southern terminus of the line.
