= Avtozavodskaya (Nizhny Novgorod Metro) =

Nizhny Novgorod Metro Station

Avtozavodskaya Автозаводская
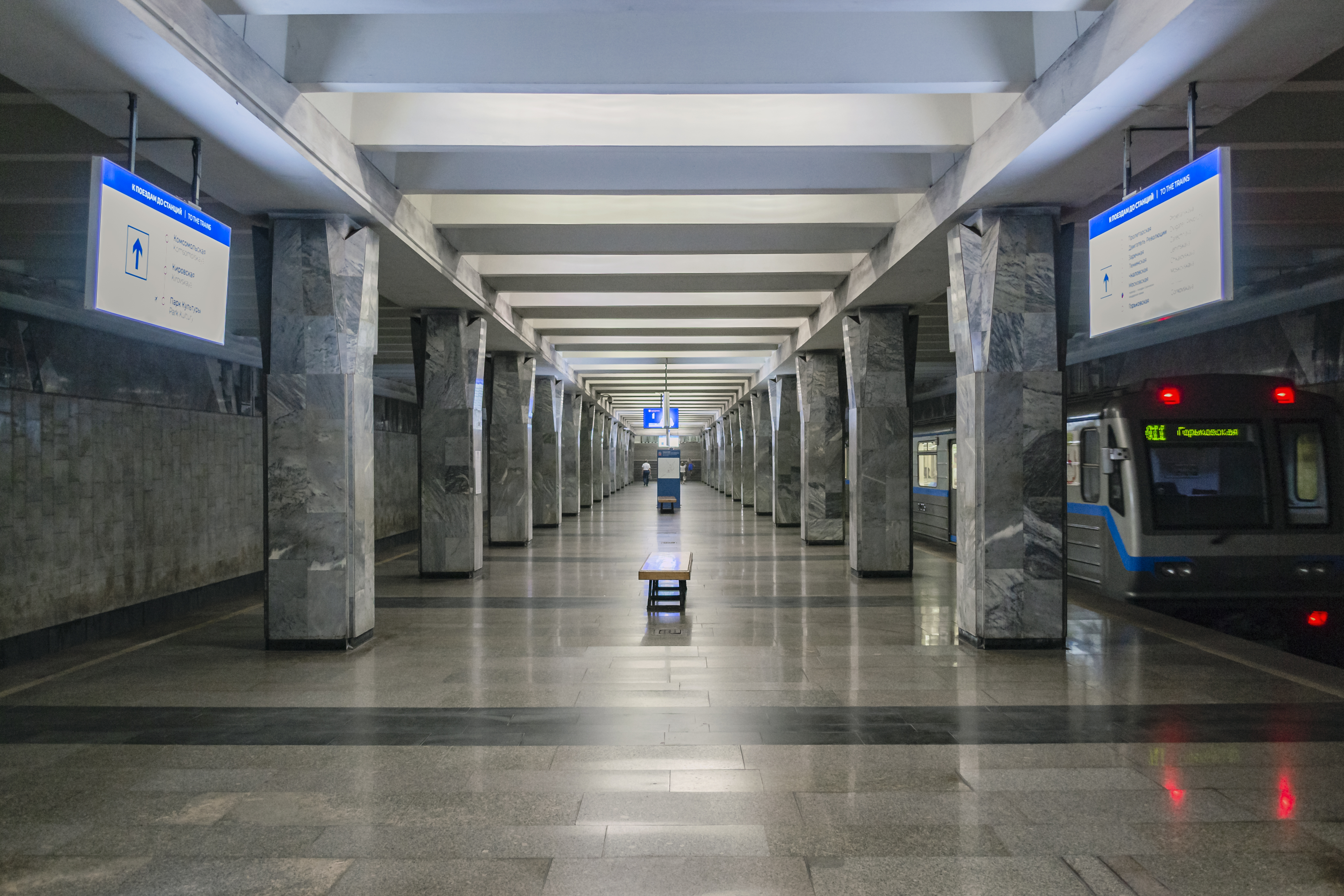

General information
- Location: Avtozavodsky District; Nizhny Novgorod; Russia
- Coordinates: 56°15′29″N 43°54′07″E
- System: Nizhny Novgorod Metro station
- Line: Line 1
- Platforms: 1
- Tracks: 2
- Connections: 8, 22, 417; 15, 20, 31, 40, 54, 56, 68, 77; 2, 11, 12

Construction
- Structure type: Three-span, shallow-column station

History
- Opened: 8 August 1987

Services
| Preceding station | Nizhny Novgorod Metro | Following station |
|---|---|---|
| Proletarskaya towards Gorkovskaya | Line 1 | Komsomolskaya towards Park Kultury |
Location

Avtozavodskaya (Russian: Автозаводская) is a station on the Avtozavodskaya line of the Nizhny Novgorod Metro. The authorities planned to open the station as part of the initial phase from Moskovskaya

It opened on 8 August 1987 in the second phase of construction with Komsomolskaya station. It is in the Avtozavodsky District of Nizhny Novgorod which gets its name from GAZ automobile factory.
