= Kirovskaya (Nizhny Novgorod Metro) =

Nizhny Novgorod Metro Station

Kirovskaya Кировская
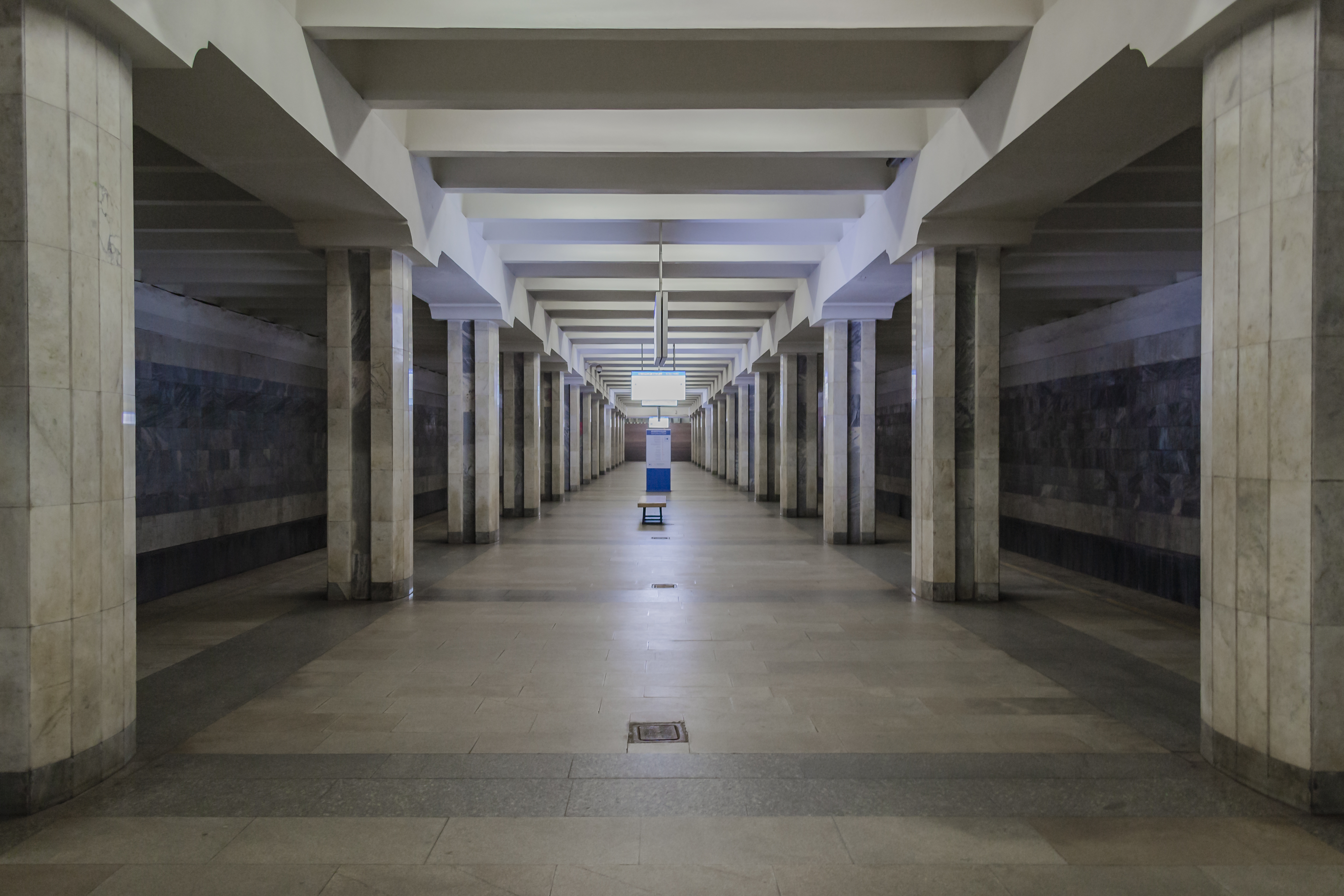

General information
- Location: Avtozavodsky district Nizhny Novgorod; Russia
- Coordinates: 56°14′52″N 43°52′42″E
- System: Nizhny Novgorod Metro station
- Line: Line 1
- Platforms: 1
- Tracks: 2
- Connections: 8, 22, 417; 15, 20, 31, 40, 54, 56, 68, 77; 2, 11, 12

Construction
- Structure type: Three-span, shallow-column station

History
- Opened: 15 November 1989

Services
Preceding station	Nizhny Novgorod Metro	Following station
Komsomolskaya towards Gorkovskaya	Line 1	Park Kultury Terminus
Location

Kirovskaya (Russian: Кировская) is a station on the Avtozavodskaya line of the Nizhny Novgorod Metro. It opened on 15 November 1989 along with Park Kultury as part of the Metro's third phase. It is in the Avtozavodsky district of Nizhny Novgorod at the intersection of Prospekt Lenina and Prospekt Kirova, the street for which the station is named.
