= Avtozavodskaya Line =

Avtozavodskaya Line may refer to:

- Aŭtazavodskaja line, Minsk
- Avtozavodskaya line (Nizhny Novgorod Metro)
