= List of Nizhny Novgorod Metro stations =

This is a list of stations on the Nizhny Novgorod Metro system in Russia.

Line 1
Station	Russian name	Transfers	Opened
Gorkovskaya	Горьковская		5 November 2012
Moskovskaya (Line 1)	Московская	Line 2	20 November 1985
Chkalovskaya	Чкаловская		20 November 1985
Leninskaya	Ленинская		20 November 1985
Zarechnaya	Заречная		20 November 1985
Dvigatel' Revolyutsii	Двигатель революции		20 November 1985
Proletarskaya	Пролетарская		20 November 1985
Avtozavodskaya	Автозаводская		8 August 1987
Komsomol'skaya	Комсомольская		8 August 1987
Kirovskaya	Кировская		15 November 1989
Park Kultury	Парк культуры		15 November 1989

Line 2
Station	Russian name	Transfers	Opened
Strelka	Стрелка		13 June 2018
Moskovskaya (Line 2)	Московская	Line 1	20 December 1993
Kanavinskaya	Канавинская		20 December 1993
Burnakovskaya	Бурнаковская		20 December 1993
Burevestnik	Буревестник		9 September 2002
