= Nizhny Novgorod Metro =

Metro system in Nizhny Novgorod, Russia

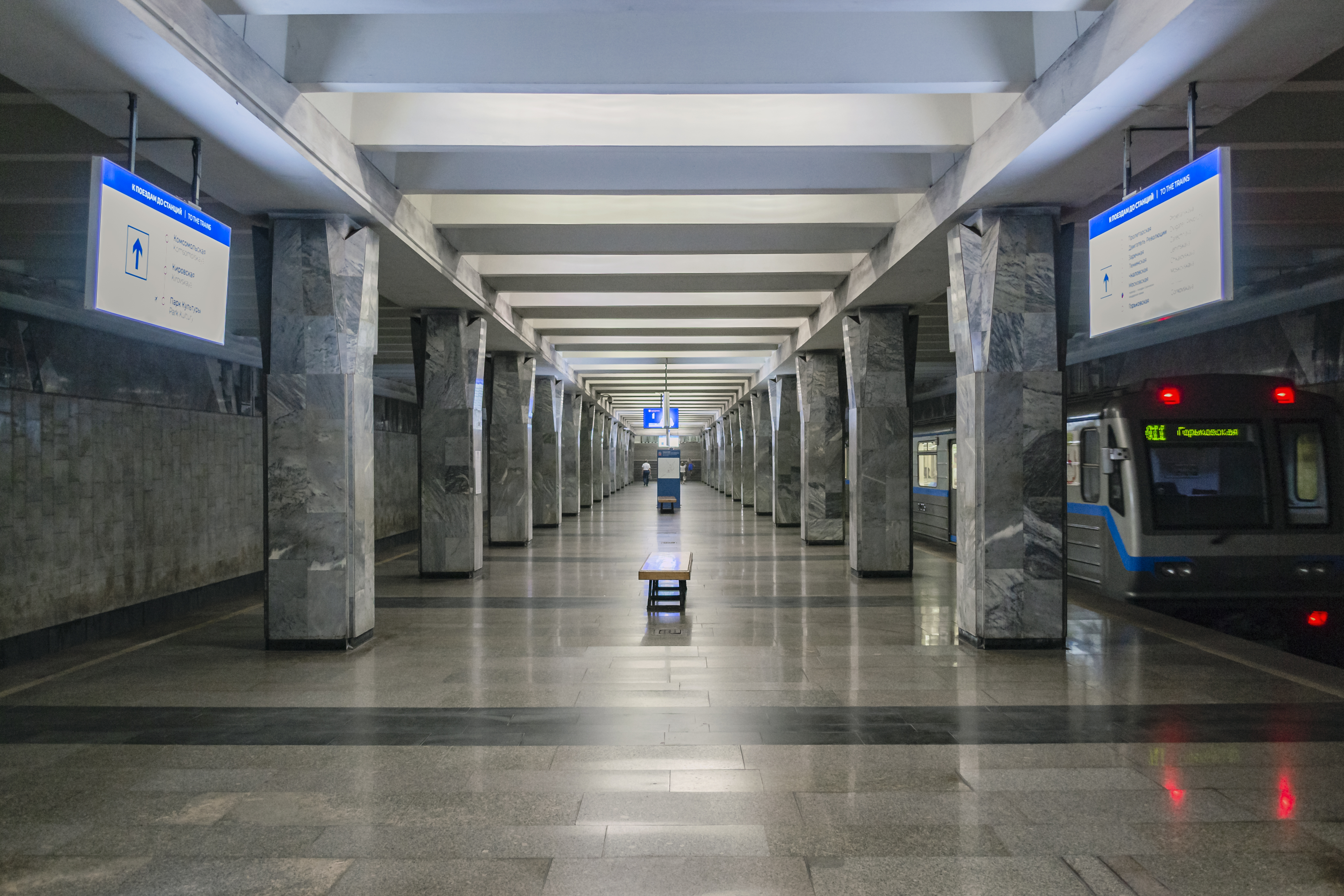
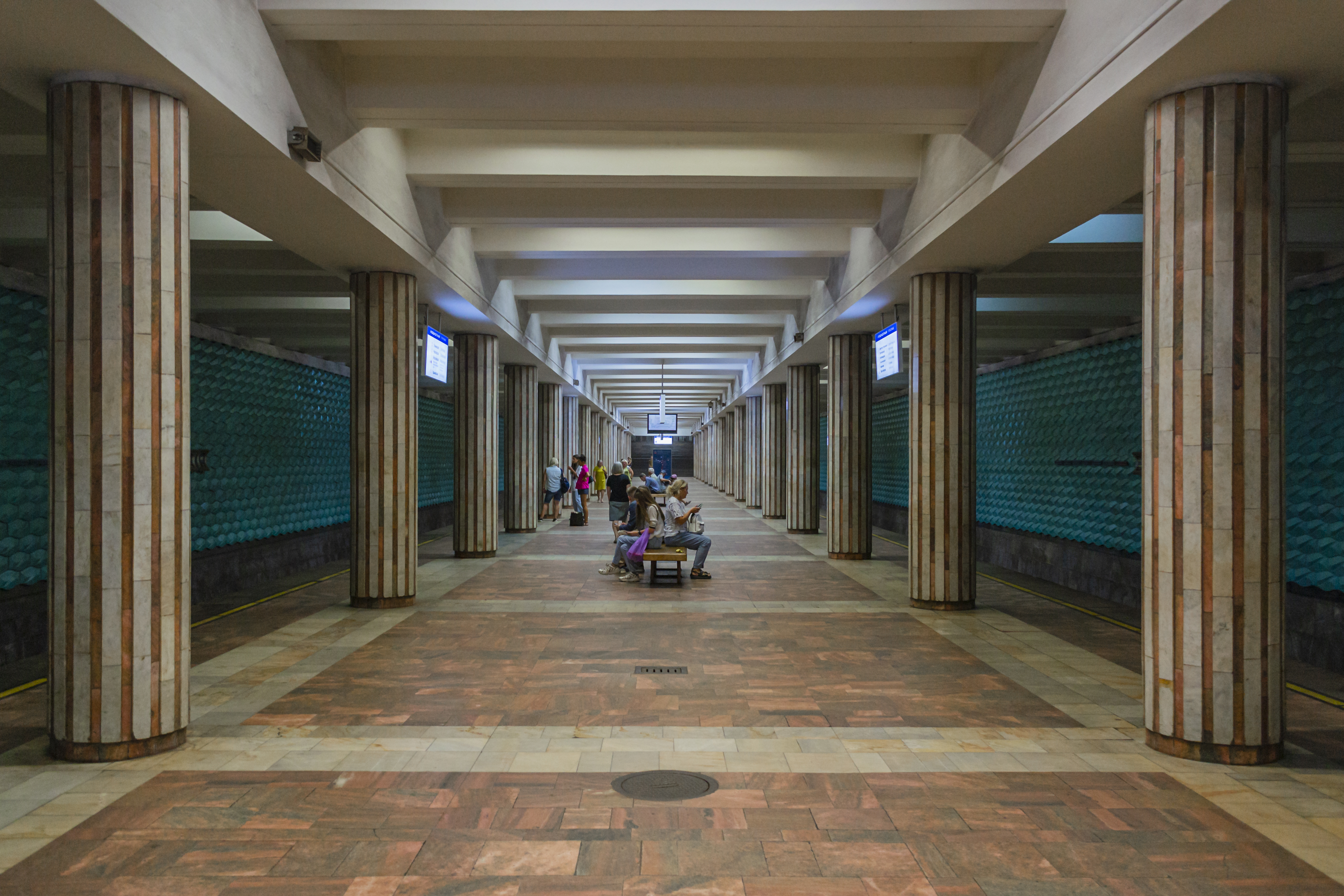
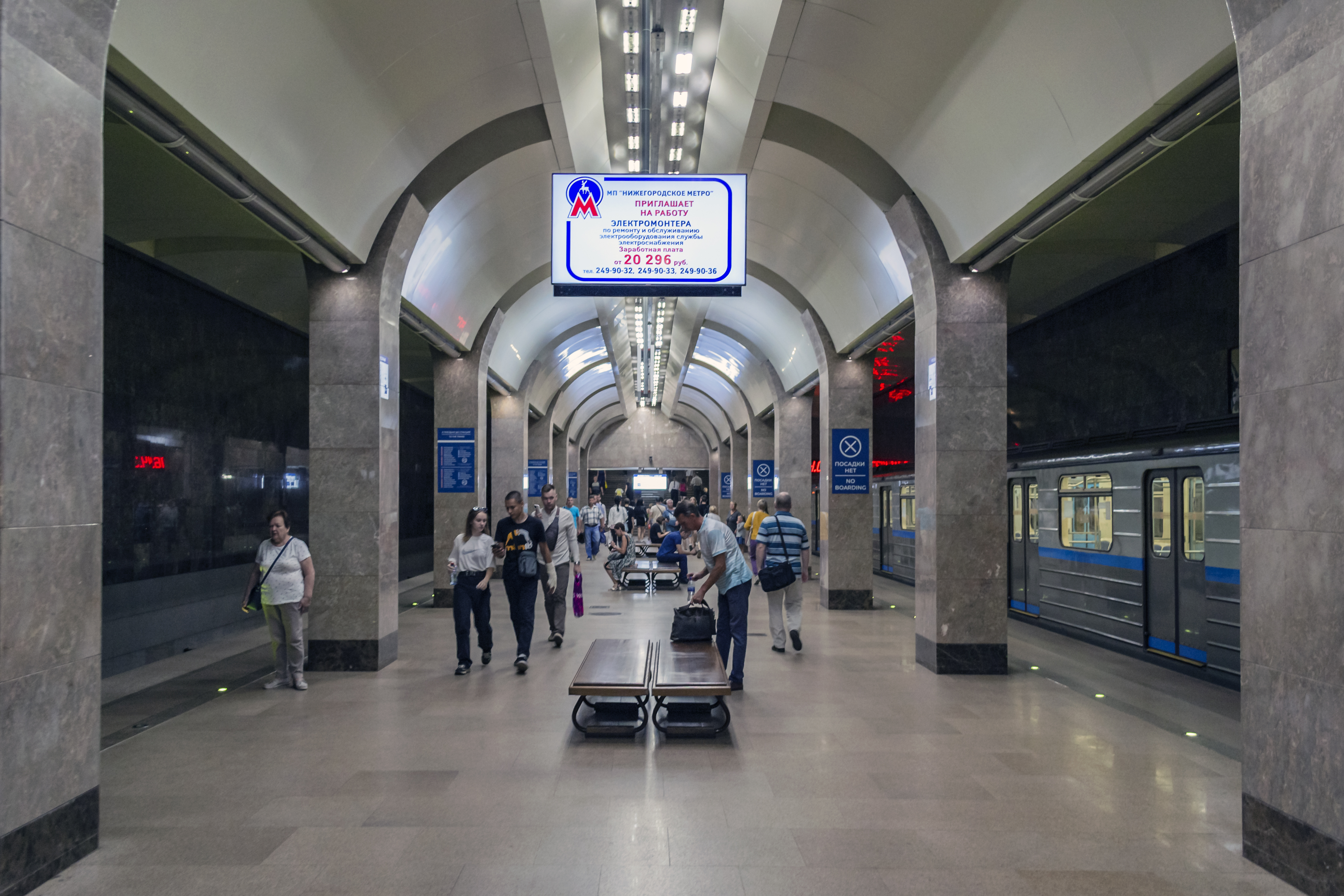
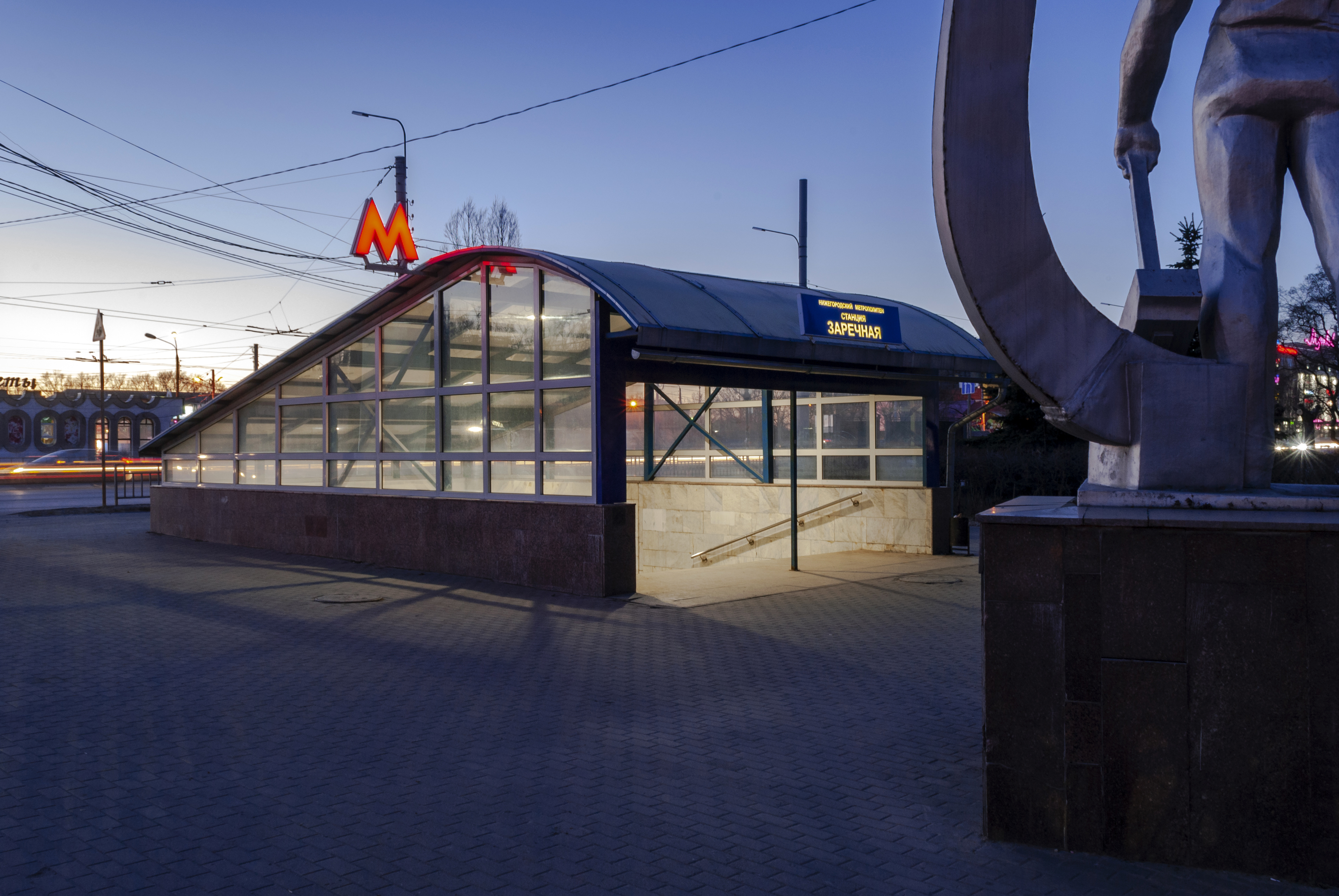
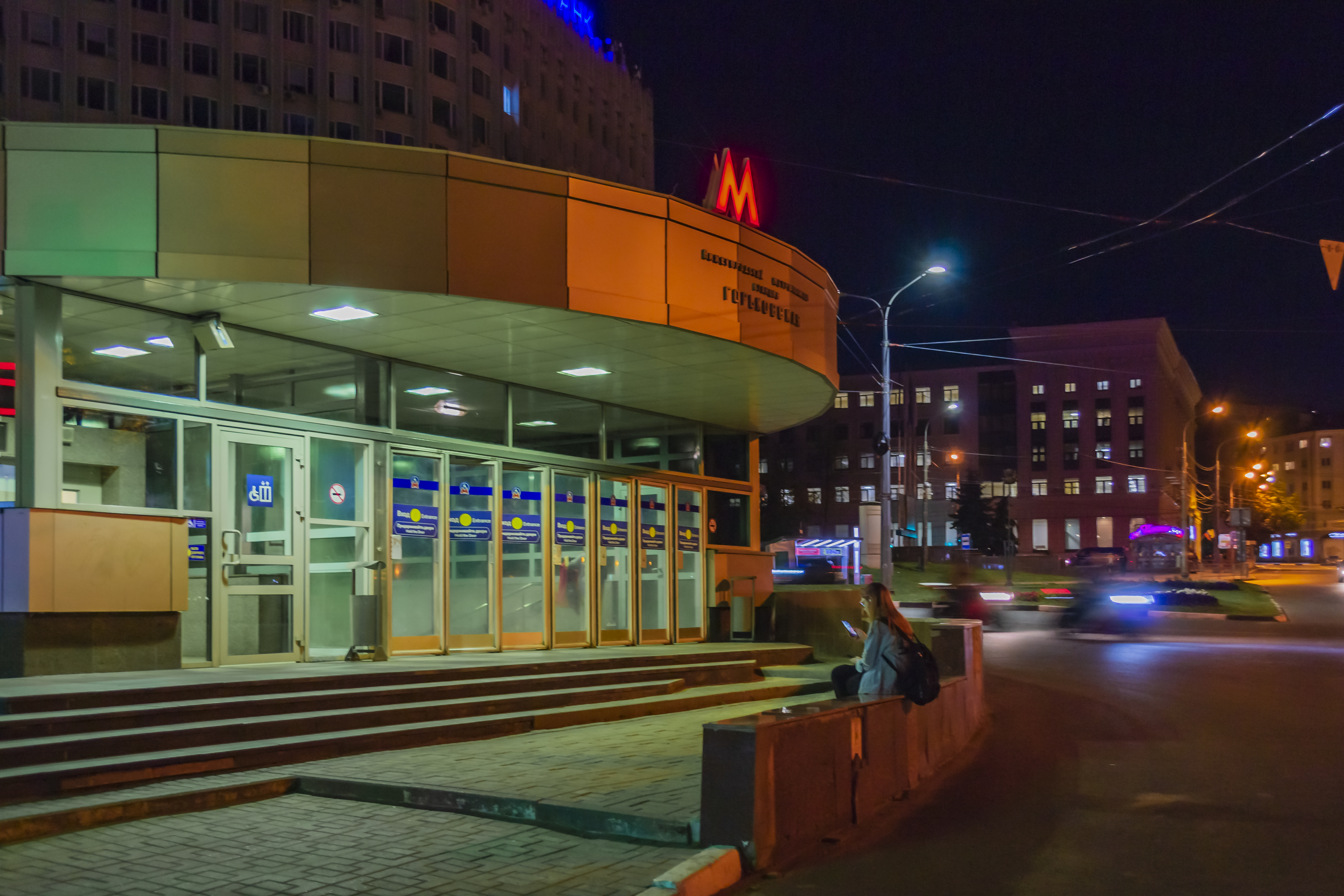
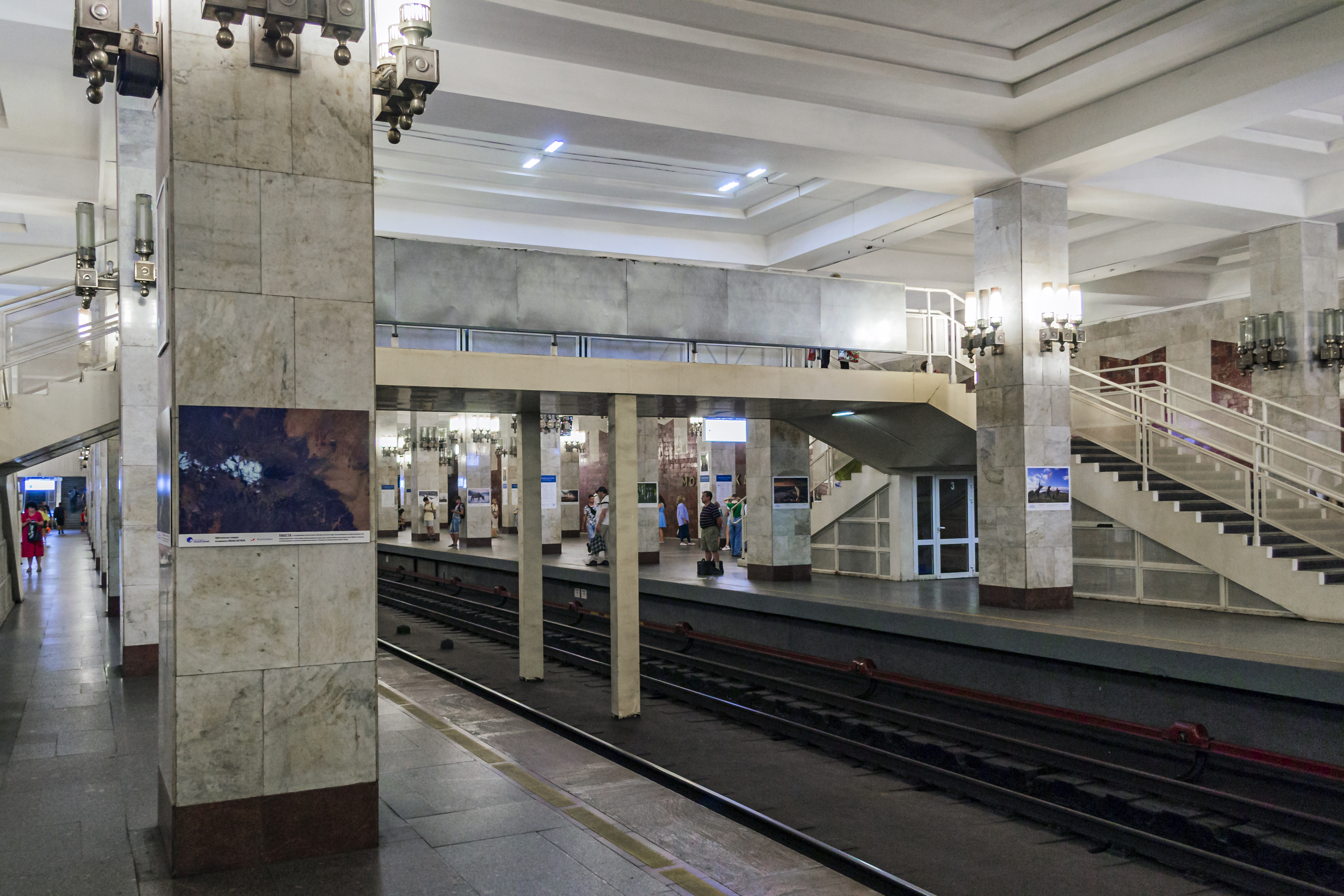
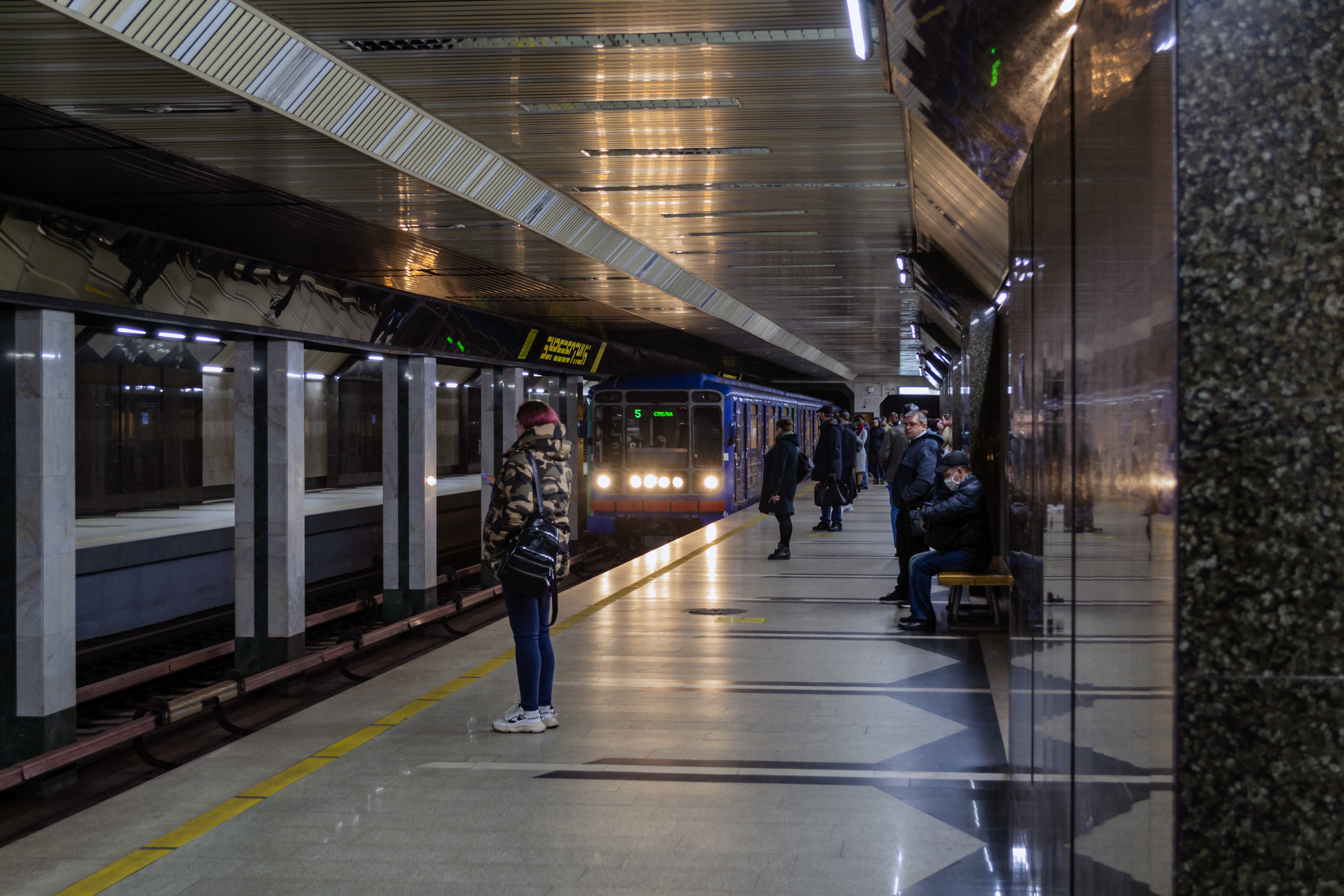
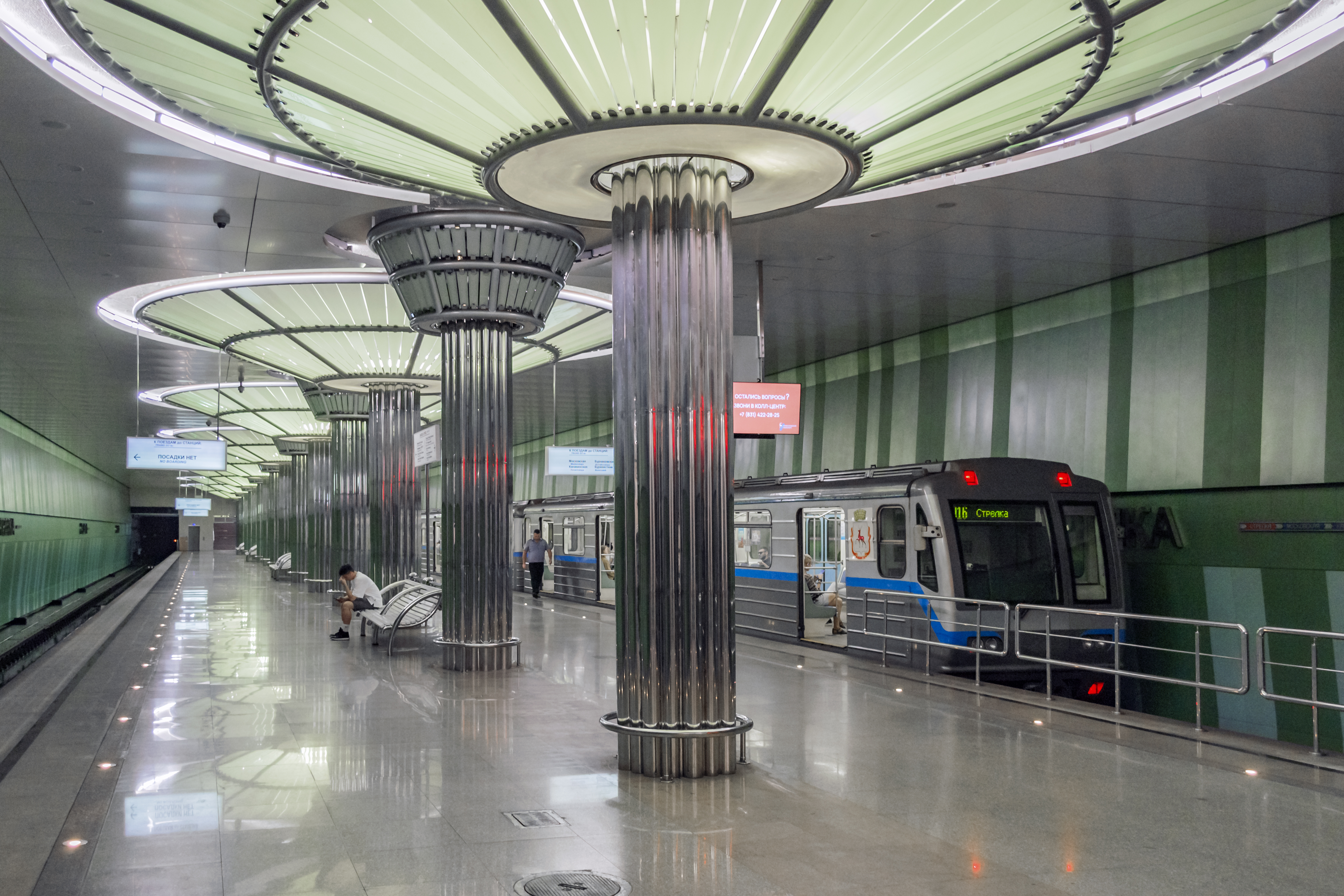
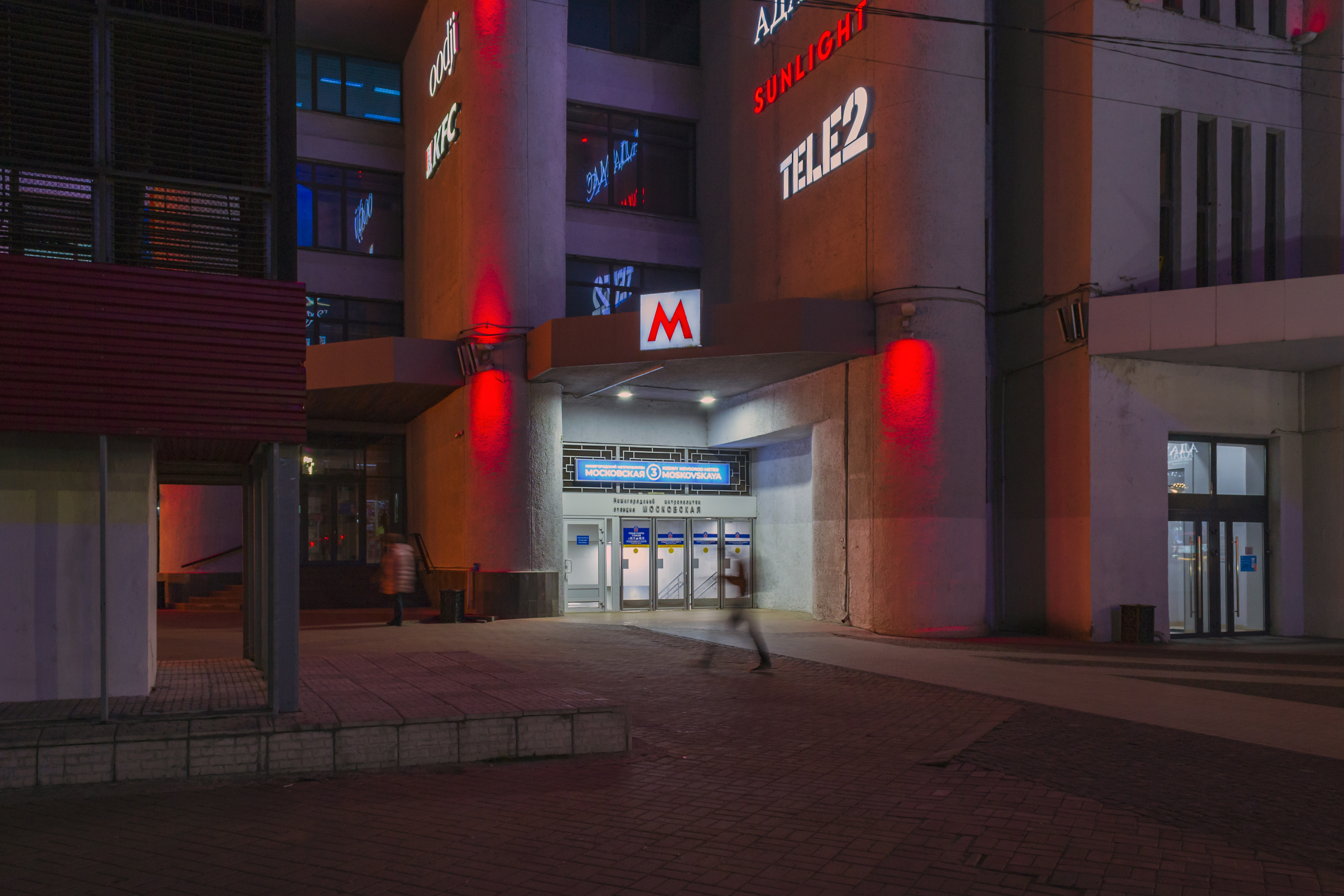
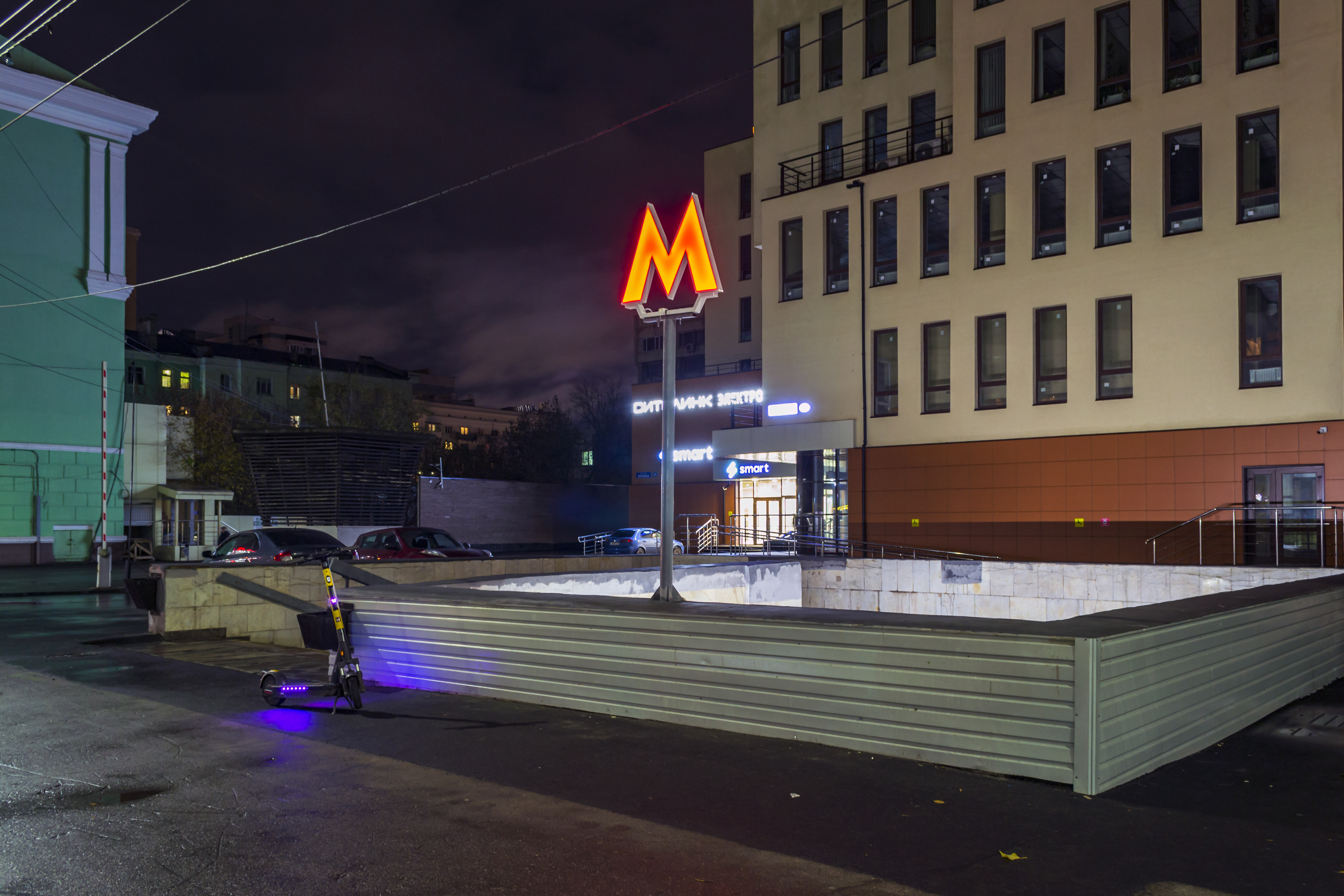
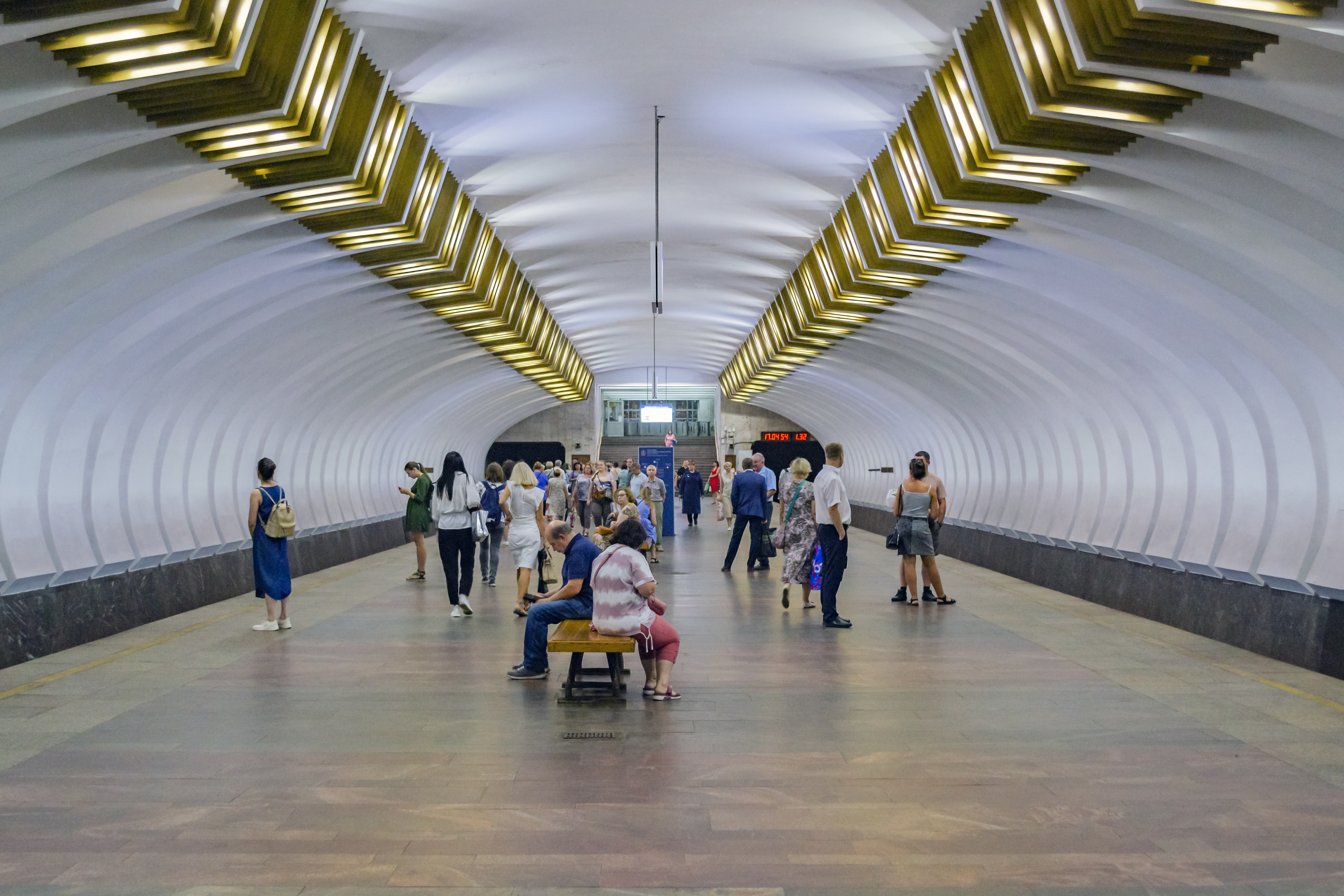
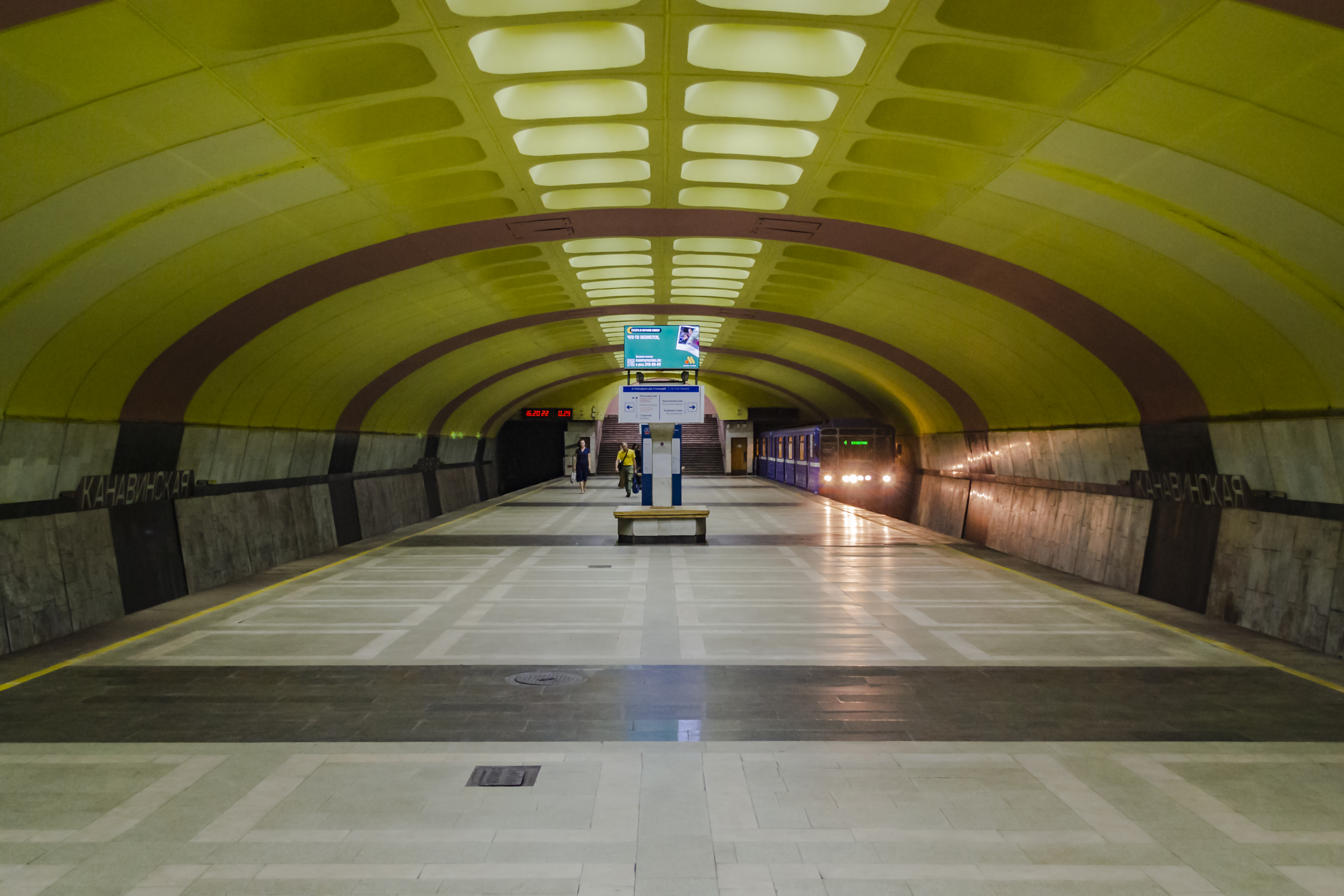
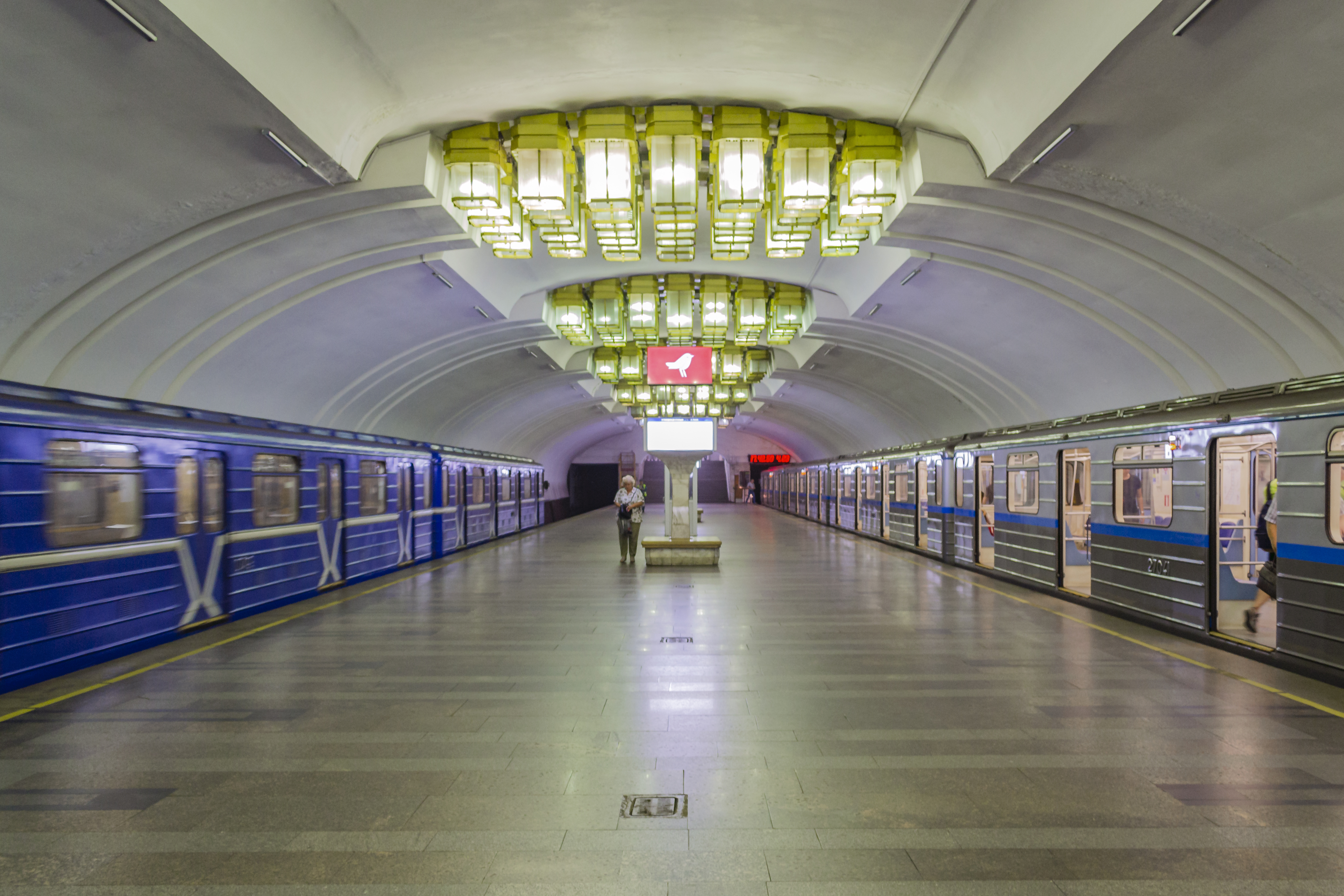
- Stations of Nizhny Novgorod Metro

Overview
- Native name: Нижегородский метрополитен Nizhegorodsky Metropoliten
- Locale: Nizhny Novgorod, Russia
- Transit type: Rapid transit
- Number of lines: 2
- Number of stations: 15
- Daily ridership: 92,7 thousand (2018)
- Annual ridership: 27,6 million (2017)
- Website: Official website

Operation
- Began operation: 20 November 1985; 40 years ago
- Operator: Nizhegorodskoye Metro

Technical
- System length: 21.6 km (13.4 mi)
System map

The Nizhny Novgorod Metro (Russian: Нижегородское метро), formerly known as the Gorky Metro (Russian: Горьковское метро), is a rapid-transit system which serves the city of Nizhny Novgorod, Russia. Opened in 1985, it consists of 15 stations and is 21.6 kilometres (13.4 mi) long. The metro connects with the City Rail and Nizhny Novgorod Central Diameters systems at the Moskovskaya station. It has the third-largest number of stations of any Russian subway system, the largest two being Moscow and St. Petersburg.

== History ==
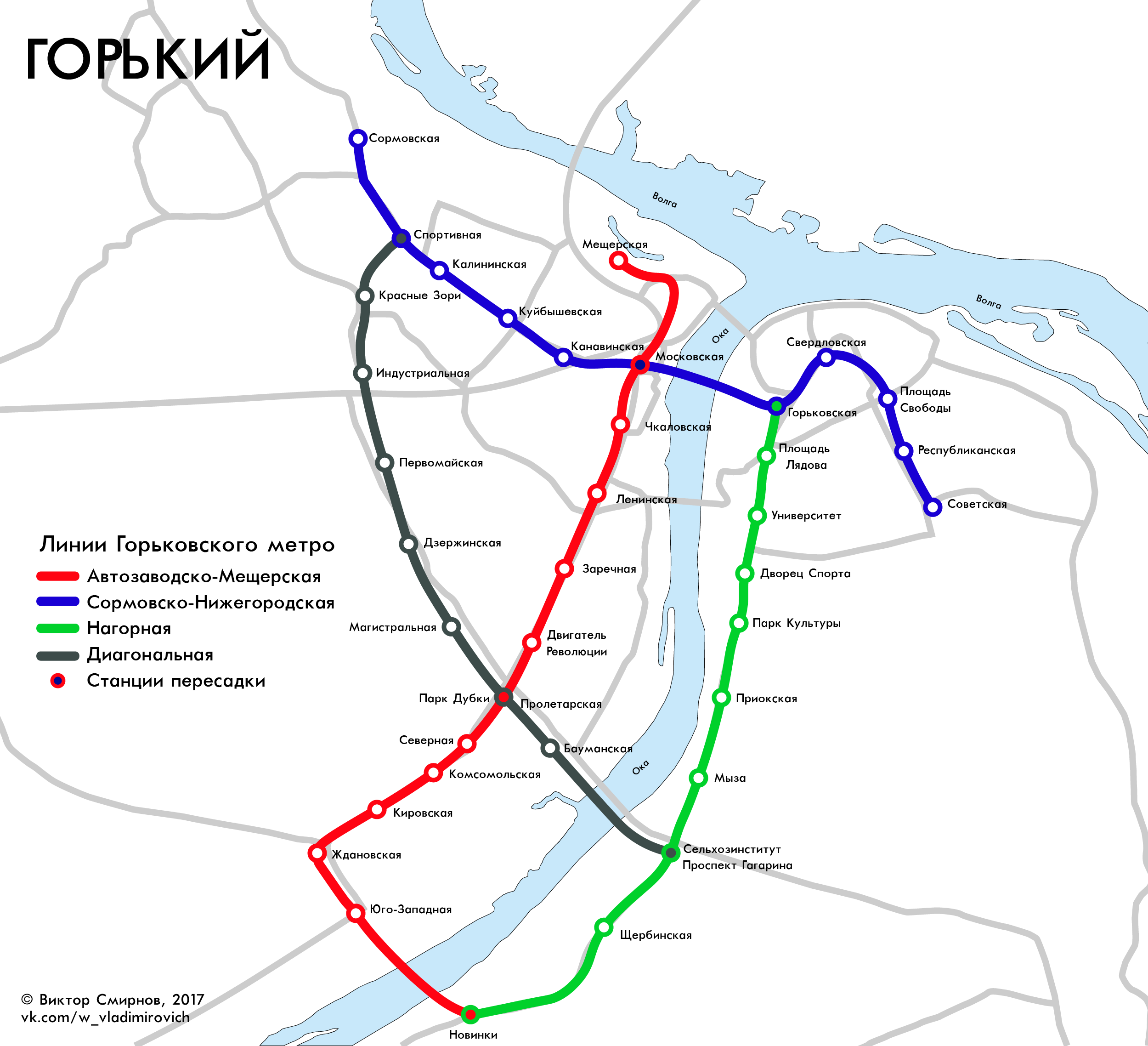
Gorky metro project

Nizhny Novgorod (known from 1932 to 1990 during the Soviet era as Gorky) is a large city on the Volga River. In the mid-1960s its population exceeded one million, meeting the Soviet requirement for the development of a rapid-transit system. Construction began on December 17, 1977, and the network was opened to the public on November 20, 1985. Russia's third subway system, it is the tenth in the former Soviet Union.

Drilling of tunnels began in September 1978 from the Leninskaya station. Developing design documentation, modifying roads and tram lines, and demolishing houses were time-consuming. In 1979, piles were driven for the foundation of the Moskovskaya station. In June 1980, it was proposed to expand the Gorky Metro to three lines.

On July 13, 1984, during construction of the Moskovskaya station, its walls collapsed; two workers from the student brigade, who were helping with construction, died. According to urban legend, the ghosts of the dead students still walk through the tunnels and metro stations.

On November 20, 1985, the Gorky Metro was opened. The first line was 7.8 km (4.8 mi) long, with six stations (Moskovskaya, Chkalovskaya, Leninskaya, Zarechnaya, Dvigatel Revolyutsii, and Proletarskaya), a depot and an engineering building. Two more stations were opened (Avtozavodskaya and Komsomolskaya, from the Proletarskaya station) in 1987, and Kirovskaya and Park Kultury opened in 1989.

=== Post-Soviet era ===
Although the pace of metro construction in the Soviet Union was impressive, the consequences of the dissolution of the Soviet Union complicated the metro's future. When the first stage was completed in 1989, construction began on the second stage. Throughout Russia, segments which opened in the early 1990s were mainly completed; bankrupt companies and workers struggled to finish them. On December 20, 1993, two stations opened on the new Line 2: Kanavinskaya and Burnakovskaya.

On September 9, 2002, the 13th station (Burevestnik, on Line 2) was opened. On September 22, 2012, the metro was closed for the first time to switch power to the new control system of the Line 1 Gorkovskaya station, which was under construction; the station opened on November 4 of that year. The Line 2 Strelka station was opened on June 12, 2018. On March 1, 2022, construction began on two stations in the Upper City on Line 1: Ploschad Svobody and Sennaya.

=== Timeline ===
Segment	Date opened	Length
Moskovskaya—Proletarskaya	November 20, 1985	7.8 km
Proletarskaya—Komsomolskaya	August 8, 1987	2.4 km
Komsomolskaya—Park Kultury	November 15, 1989	2.2 km
Moskovskaya—Burnakovskaya	December 20, 1993	2.6 km
Burnakovskaya—Burevestnik	September 9, 2002	1.3 km
Moskovskaya—Gorkovskaya	November 5, 2012	3.5 km
Moskovskaya—Strelka	June 13, 2018	3.1 km
Total:	15 stations	22.0 km

== System ==
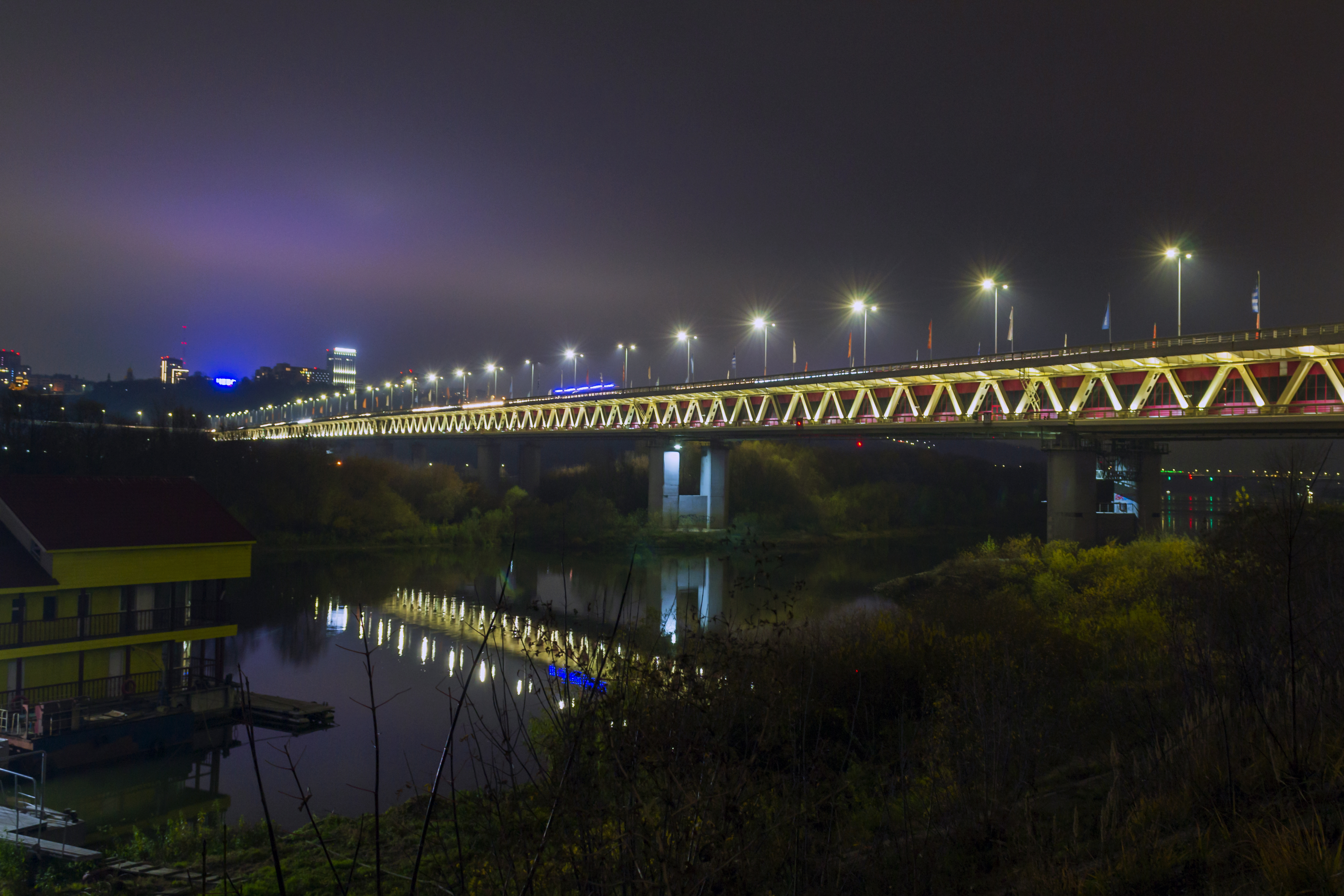
Metro bridge over the Oka River

The metro has 15 stations, 14 of which are underground. There is also a ghost station: Yarmarka, whose construction was abandoned in favour of the Strelka station. The system has two lines, with a cross-platform interchange at Moskovskaya. After the construction of Line 3 (Nagornaya), there will be two more transfer stations: Operny Teatr and Olgino.

Line 1 has right-hand traffic. Line 2 has left-hand traffic because the rails split at Moskovskaya due to the lack of a full-length tunnel on that line.

The underground stations have shallow level designs. Moskovskaya has the typical USSR five-pillar span; Chkalovskaya, Leninskaya, Park Kultury, and Kanaviskaya are standard single-vaults, and the rest are standard pillar tri-spans. The surface station, Burevestnik, has a side-platform layout.

The metro's rolling stock, supplied by the Proletarskoye depot, consists of eighty Metrovagonmash 81-717/81-714s; most trains are four cars long, but some modernized trains are five cars long and run during the peak hours. The interval between trains is 7½ to eight minutes at midday.

=== City layout ===
Unlike other Soviet-era metros, Nizhny Novgorod does not have the usual triangular layout (three lines and six spokes intersecting in the city centre) because of the city's unusual layout. Nizhny Novgorod is on the Volga River, at its confluence with the Oka River. During the 20th century, the city developed polycentrically. The historic city centre (including the Nizhny Novgorod Kremlin), including most of its administrative, cultural, and educational facilities, is on the high, hilly bank of the Oka. The low, flat, opposite bank contains most of the city's industries and some large residential districts grouped around Kanavinsky City district or Kanavino. Kanavinsky City district also has the city's central railway station and the largest urban transport hubs; Sormovsky City district largest industries are the Krasnoye Sormovo plant.

=== Metro layout ===
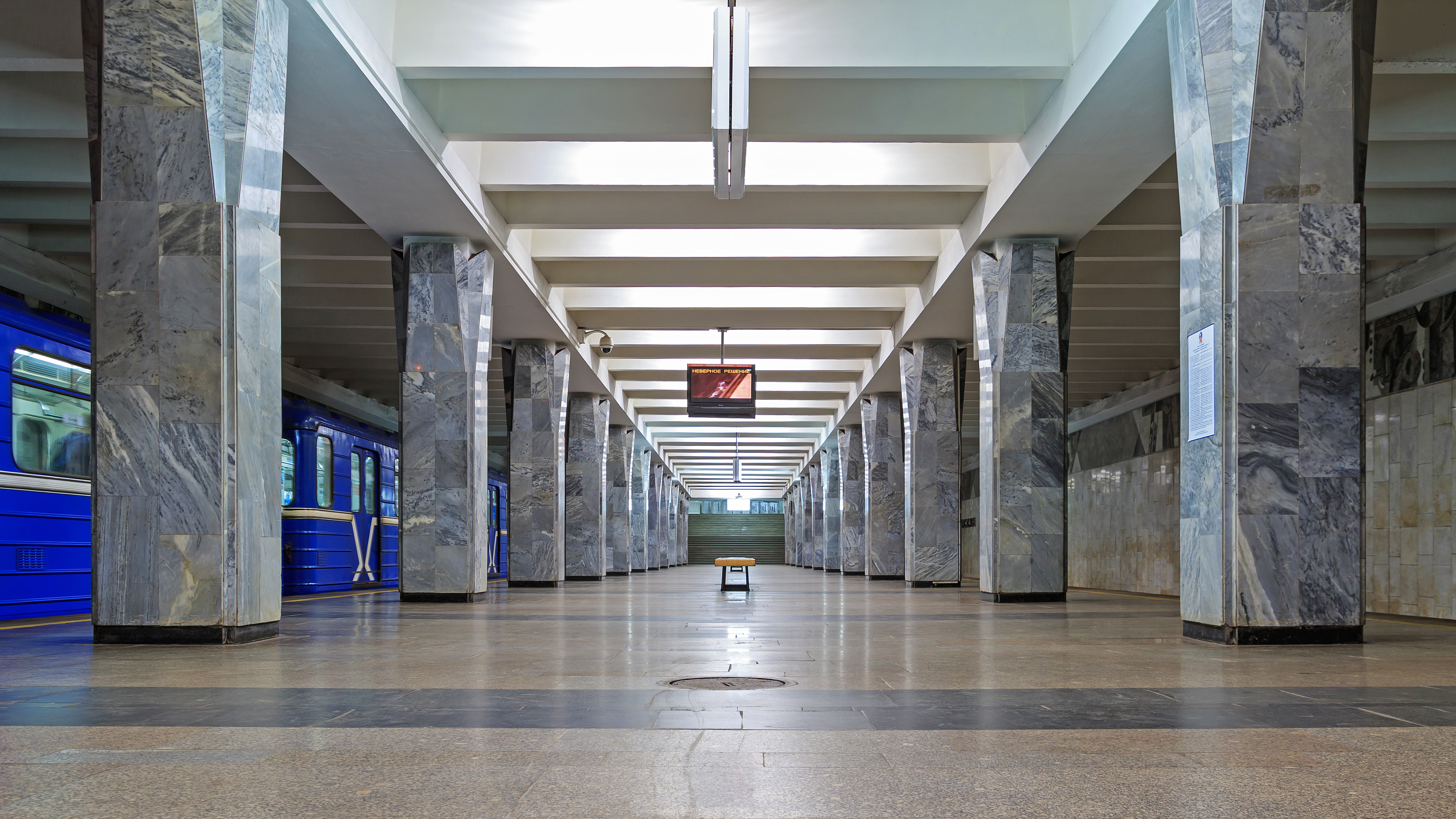
Avtozavodskaya station

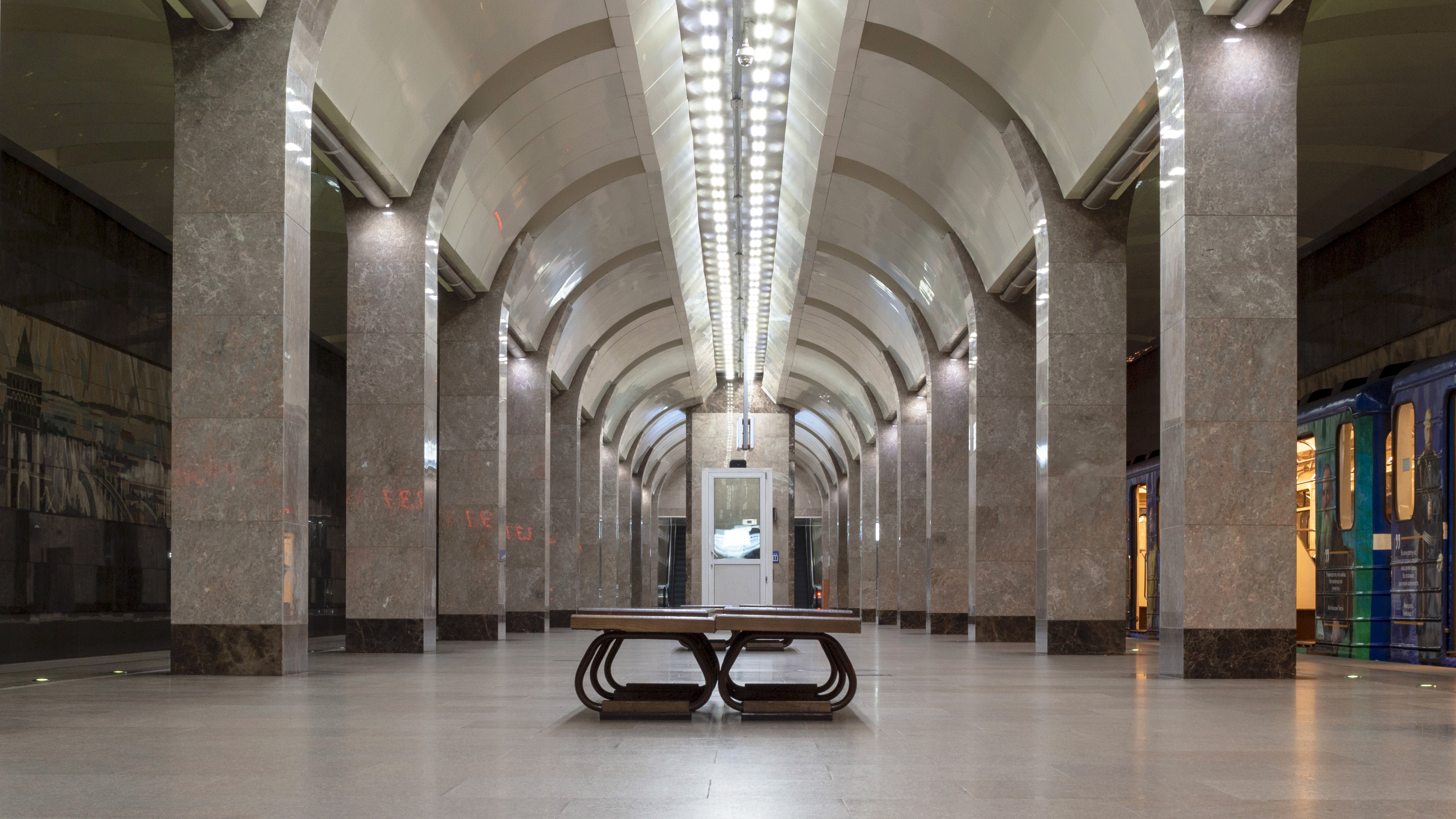
Gorkovskaya Station

Faced with such a geographical arrangement, the metro planners adopted a design which would have two lines with four spokes, opened in a series of stages (and each stage in segments). The system's hub, the Moskovskaya station (next to Nizhny Novgorod's main railway station), would have a four-track, two-island platform for cross-platform transfer.

==== Stages ====
The first stage would be the Line 1, following the west bank of the Oka through the residential and industrial zones of the Kanavinsky and Leninsky City districts, the Gorky Automobile plant and into the Avtozavodsky City district. The second stage, the Line 2, would run west from Moskovskaya station into the Sormovsky City district or Sormovo. The third stage would incorporate a combined auto-metro bridge across the Oka, bringing the Avtozavodskaya Line into the city centre. The fourth and final stage would be the Line 2 to the Meshcherskoye Ozero residential area north-west of the railway station, on the Volga. The 25-kilometre (16 mi) system, with over 20 stations, was planned for completion by the late 1990s.

The order in which the stages were opened was influenced by industry-specific Soviet-era passenger flow and the depot-placement issue; cross-river traffic was less heavy. GAZ is the Avtozavodsky City district's chief employer, and many workers lived in the northern parts of the city. The only suitable location for the rail depot was near the automobile plant.

== Lines ==
Livery	Name	Name (Cyrillic)	Date opened	Newest station	Length (km)	# of stations	Ride time (end to end)
Line 1	Line 1 (Avtozavodskaya)	Линия 1 (Автозаводская)	20 November 1985	4 November 2012	14.5	11	18 minutes
Line 2	Line 2 (Sormovsko-Meshcherskaya)	Линия 2 (Сормовско-Мещерская)	20 November 1985	12 June 2018	7.1	5	10 minutes
Total:					21.6	15	

=== Line 1 ===
Line 1, Avtozavodskaya, runs between Park Kultury and Gorkovskaya and was opened in 1985. It has one interchange station (Moskovskaya, on line 2), and connects the lower and upper cities by bridge.

It was designed in 1980. During the Soviet era, the line was called Avtozavodsko-Meshcherskaya and was intended to last until the residential micro-district near Meshchersky Lake was built.

=== Line 2 ===
Line 2, also known as Sormovsko-Meshcherskaya or Sormovskaya, runs between the Burevestnik and Moskovskaya stations and was opened in 1993. In January 1981, the line was known as Sormovsko-Nagornaya and was planned to connect the industrial lower city and the historic upper city. Construction of the line was halted several times due to crises in Russia. For the 2018 FIFA World Cup, the Strelka station was built near Nizhny Novgorod Stadium. After the World Cup, it is planned to extend the line to the Volga station in Meshchera and the Varya station in Sormovo. The Yarmarka ghost station is also planned to be completed.

== Future plans ==

The Gorkovskaya station, the first station east of the Oka River, opened in November 2012. Before the extension of Line 1 in 2012, low ridership was a challenge. Despite a longer line than other Russian Metro systems at the time (including Novosibirsk, Samara and Yekaterinburg), its passenger traffic was one of the lowest with a 16.8 million annual ridership in 2004. In comparison, the Novosibirsk system had almost double the annual ridership of the Nizhny Novgorod Metro.

Construction of the metro bridge began in 1995 and was completed in November 2009. After the extension of Line 1 to the city centre, there are three proposals for development. The first was the extension of the Sormovskaya Line to the Strelka station, near the Nizhny Novgorod Stadium for the 2018 FIFA World Cup. The second is the extension of the Sormovskaya Line to Sormovo. The third proposal is the eastern extension of the line in the city centre, with construction of the Operny Teatr and Sennaya stations.

== See also ==
- List of Nizhny Novgorod metro stations
- Nizhny Novgorod City Rail
- Trams in Nizhny Novgorod
- List of rapid transit systems
