= Line 1 (Nizhny Novgorod Metro) =

Metro line in Nizhny Novgorod, Russia

Avtozavodskaya

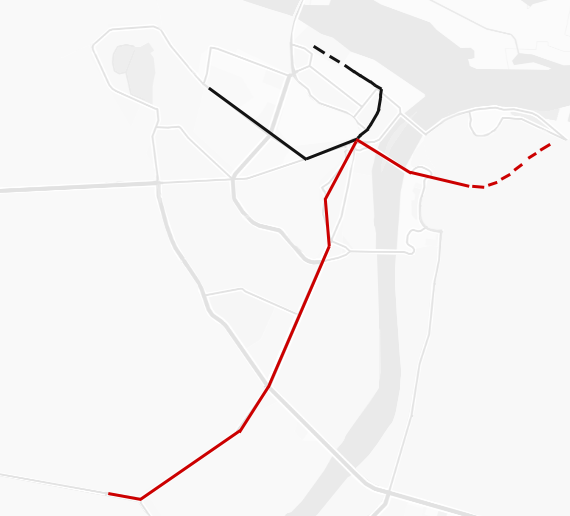

Overview
- Owner: Nizhny Novgorod Metro
- Stations: 11

History
- Opened: 1985; 41 years ago
- Last extension: 2012

Technical
- Line length: 15.1 km (9.4 mi)
- Track gauge: 1,524 mm (5 ft)

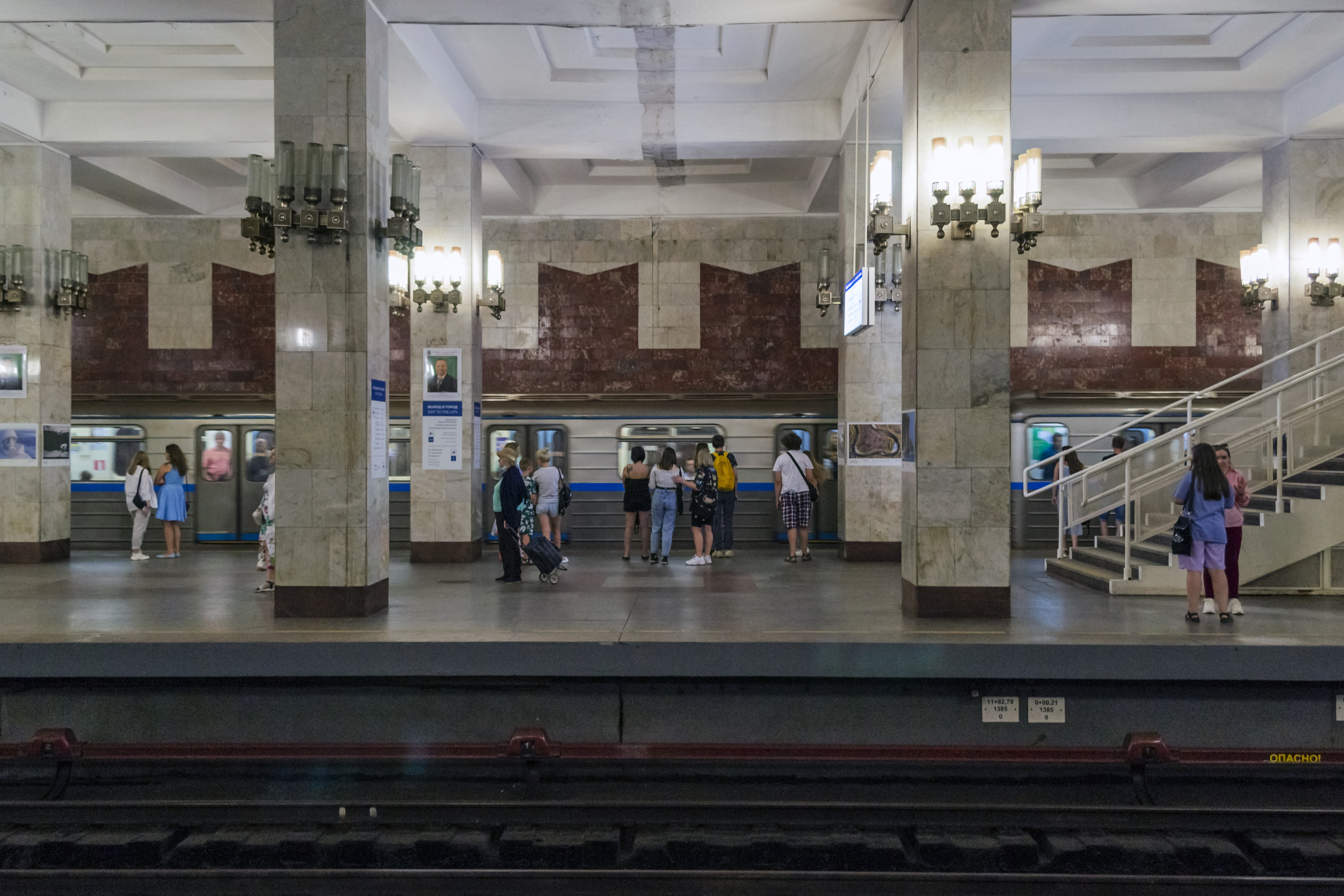
Moskovskaya station

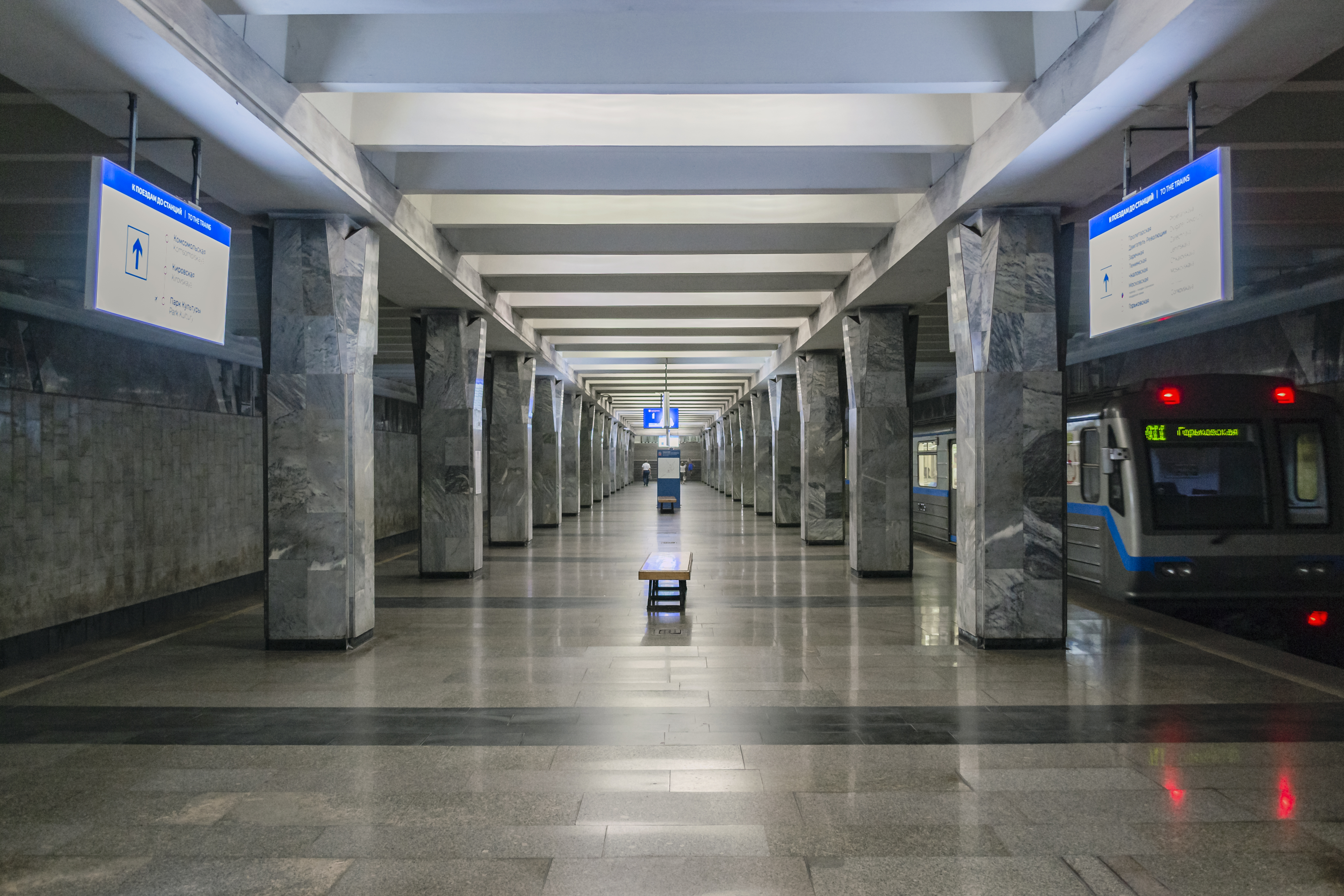
Avtozavodskaya station

Avtozavodskaya Line (Russian: Автозаво́дская) is a line of the Nizhny Novgorod Metro and bears the abbreviation M1. The line opened in 1985 and crosses the city on a northwest-southeast axis. It comprises 11 stations and 15.1 km (9.4 mi) of track and is thus about four times as long as the Line 2 (M2). The train station Moskovskaya is the second station, which does not cross, but only touches.

== History ==
The construction of the line began on December 17, 1977. On this day, the first piles were driven into the base of the station Leninskaya. A commemorative sign was erected on the site of the construction (letter M in the tunnel). In September 1978 tunneling began from the station Leninskaya. July 13, 1984 in the pit of the station Moskovskaya collapsed walls. Two workers from the student brigade, who helped with the construction of the metro, died. There is a legend that the ghosts of dead students are still walking through tunnels and metro stations.

November 20, 1985, the grand opening of the Line 1 of the Gorky Metro was held. The launch complex of the first section included a 7.8 km long line with six stations: Moskovskaya, Chkalovskaya, Leninskaya, Zarechnaya, Dvigatel Revolyutsii and Proletarskaya; Depot and engineering building. In 1987, two more stations were opened - Avtozavodskaya and Komsomolskaya from the Proletarskaya station, and in 1989 - Kirovskaya and Park Kultury. November 4, 2012, the Gorkovskaya station of the Line 1 in the Upper City was opened.

=== Timeline ===
Segment	Date opened	Length		Number of stations
Segment	Date opened	km	mi	Number of stations
Moskovskaya — Proletarskaya	20 Nov 1985	6.8	4.2	6
Proletarskaya — Komsomolskaya	8 Aug 1987	2.1	1.3	2
Komsomolskaya — Park Kultury	15 Nov 1989	2.4	1.5	2
Moskovskaya — Gorkovskaya	4 Nov 2012	3.2	2.0	1
Total		15.1	9.4	11

== Stations and connections ==
(Gorkovskaya – Park Kultury)
Travel Time minutes	Station	Travel Time minutes	Connection	Nearby landmarks
0	Gorkovskaya	5	1, 16, 26, 30, 40, 41, 43, 45, 64, 68; 31	Gorky monument, Burger King, House of the connection, Department of the Ministry of Internal Affairs, Monument to the dead policemen, School of Alexander II, Bolshaya Pokrovskaya Street, Ochag patty
5	Moskovskaya	4	City Rail; Nizhny Novgorod railway station 1, 3, 6, 7, 27, 417; 3, 4, 7, 17, 19, 22, 26, 43, 45, 48, 57, 61, 66, 69, 80, 90, 95; 7, 10, 15, 25	Moskovsky railway terminal, Metro Department, Central Department Store, Burger King, KFC, Gordeevsky Department Store
4	Chkalovskaya	3	1, 3, 27, 417; 37	Children's Railway, Lenin House of Culture (abandoned), Kanavinsky city district Administration
3	Leninskaya	4	40, 58, 66	Metro monument, Department of the Gorky Railway, Vkusno i tochka
4	Zarechnaya	4	19, 23A, 40, 56, 58, 66	Komarov monument, Zarechnaya Hotel, Rossiya Cinema, Zarechny bazaar, Muravey shopping centre, Leninsky city district Administration, Burger King, KFC
4	Dvigatel Revolyutsii	4	40, 56, 58, 66	Hospital No. 33, Khlebnitsa patty
4	Proletarskaya	3	8, 417; 31, 40, 56, 58, 64, 65, 66, 68, 69, 73, 77, 85; 2, 11, 12	Dubki park, Teploobmennik Plant, Intercity bus station, Khlebnitsa patty
3	Avtozavodskaya	3	8, 22, 417; 15, 20, 31, 40, 54, 56, 68, 77; 2, 11, 12	North entrance of the Gorky Automobile Plant (GAZ)
3	Komsomolskaya	3	8, 22, 417; 15, 20, 31, 33, 40, 54, 56, 68, 77; 2, 11, 12	Komsomolskaya entrance of the Gorky Automobile Plant
3	Kirovskaya	4	8, 22, 417; 15, 20, 31, 40, 54, 56, 68, 77; 2, 11, 12	Main entrance of the Gorky Automobile Plant, Automechanical College, O'Key Mall, Khlebnitsa patty
4	Park Kultury	0	8; 11, 20, 31, 32, 40, 68, 69; 2, 4, 12, 14	Avtozavodsky Park, House of Culture of GAZ, the Mir Cinema, KFC, Khlebnitsa patty
