= Park Kultury (Nizhny Novgorod Metro) =

Nizhny Novgorod Metro Station

Park Kultury Парк культуры
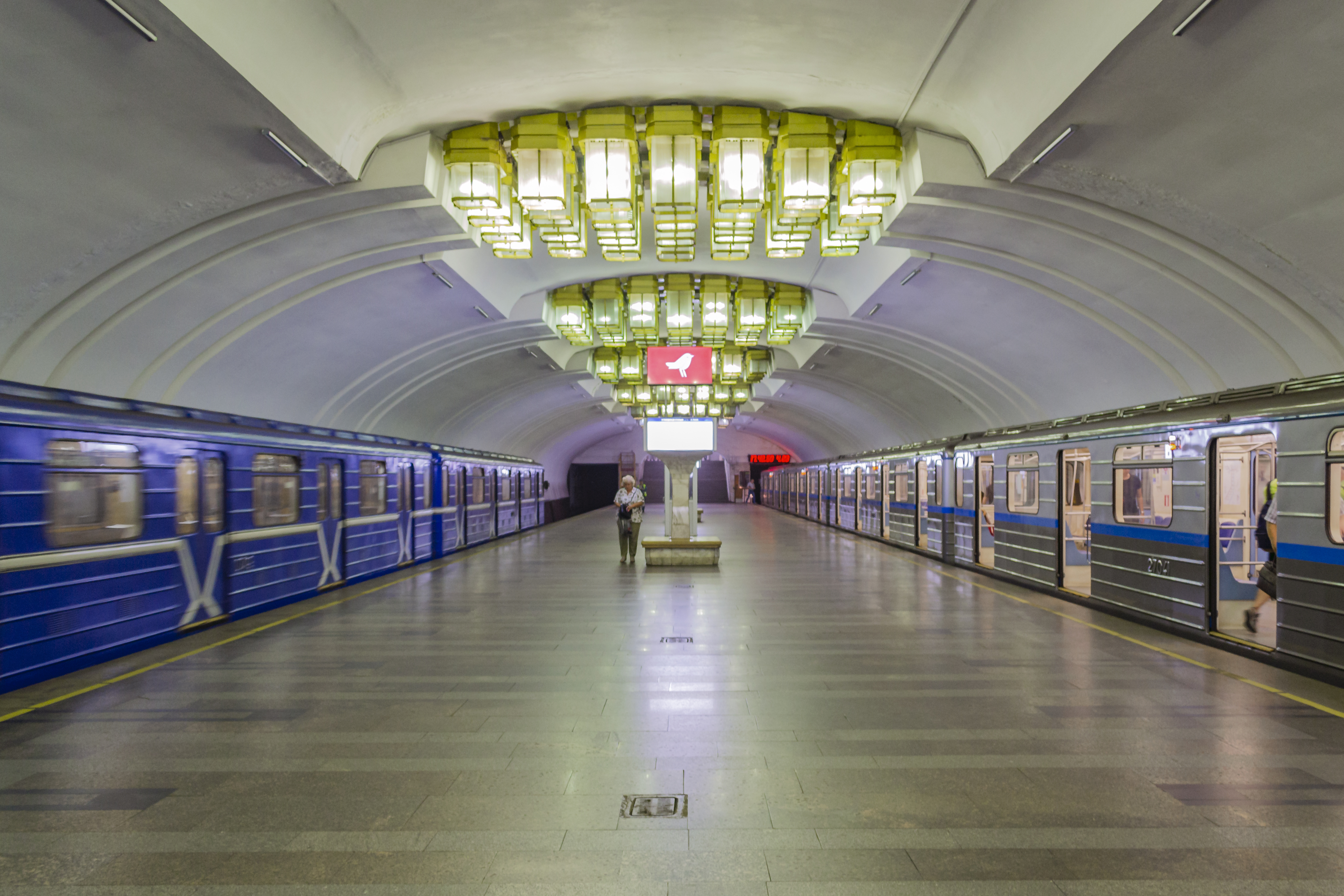

General information
- Coordinates: 56°14′32″N 43°51′27″E
- System: Nizhny Novgorod Metro station
- Line: Line 1
- Platforms: 1
- Tracks: 2
- Connections: 8; 11, 20, 31, 32, 40, 68, 69; 2, 4, 12, 14

Construction
- Structure type: Single-span shallow station

History
- Opened: 15 November 1989
- Former names: Zhdanovskaya

Services
Preceding station	Nizhny Novgorod Metro	Following station
Kirovskaya towards Gorkovskaya	Line 1	Terminus
Location

Park Kultury (Russian: Парк культу́ры) is the southern terminus of the Avtozavodskaya line of the Nizhny Novgorod Metro. The station opened on 15 November 1989 in the third phase on construction along with Kirovskaya station.

== Location ==
The station is under Molodyozhny Prospekt (Avenue of the Youth) in the south of Nizhny Novgorod, on the edge of the city’s Avtozavodsky Culture Park, from which it takes its name. Exits at both ends of the platform lead to Molodyozhny Prospekt.

== History ==
In the planning phase, the station was called Zhdanovskaya. It opened on 15 November 1989. Three days later, a crack in the tunnel required a temporary closure of the Komsomolskaya–Park Kultury section for repairs.

== See also ==
- List of Nizhny Novgorod metro stations
