= Gorkovskaya (Nizhny Novgorod Metro) =

Nizhny Novgorod Metro Station

Gorkovskaya Горьковская
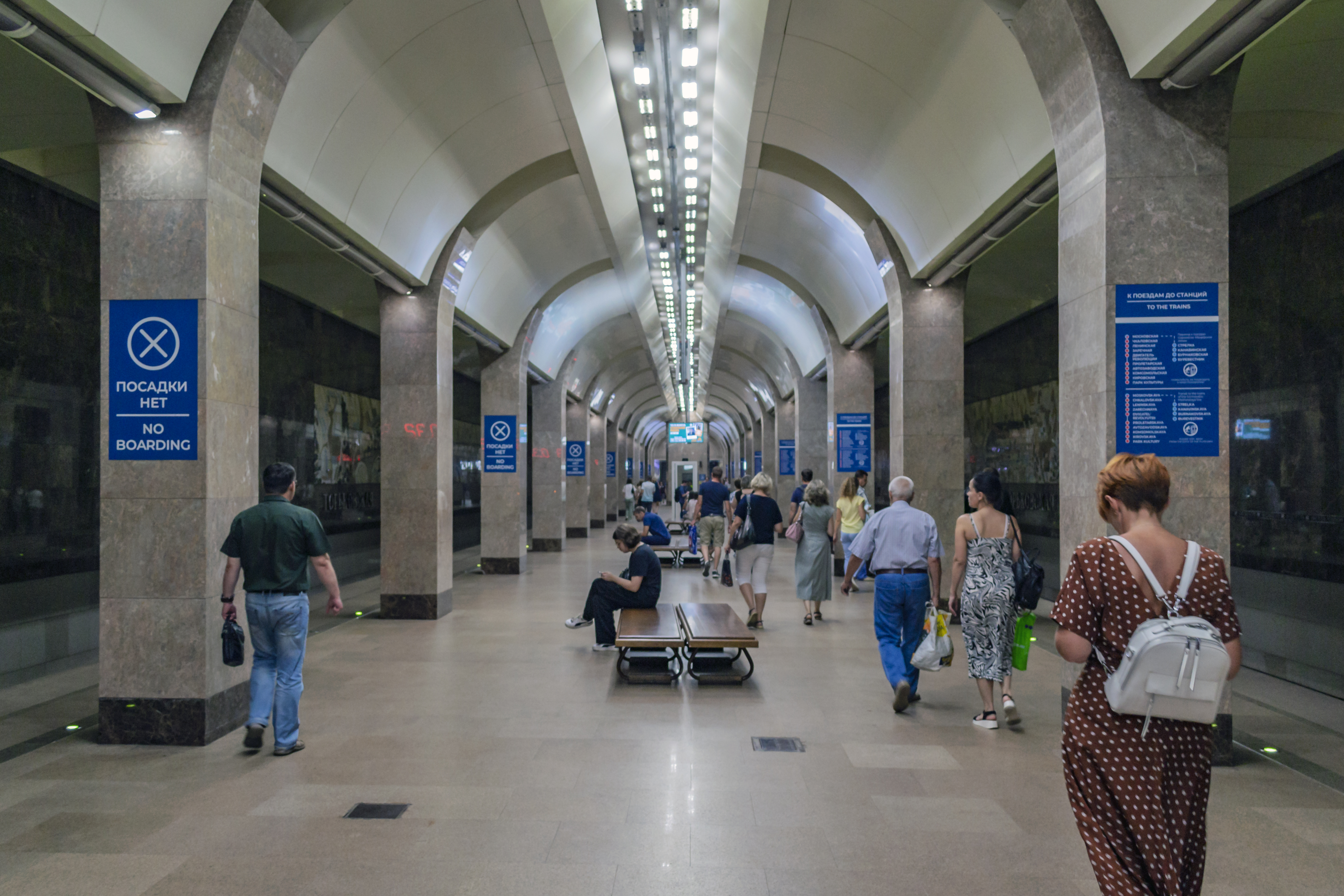

General information
- Coordinates: 56°18′50″N 43°59′42″E
- System: Nizhny Novgorod Metro station
- Line: Line 1
- Platforms: 1
- Tracks: 2
- Connections: 1, 16, 26, 30, 40, 41, 43, 45, 64, 68; 31

Construction
- Structure type: Three-span, shallow-column station

History
- Opened: 4 November 2012

Services
Preceding station	Nizhny Novgorod Metro	Following station
Terminus	Line 1	Moskovskaya towards Park Kultury
Route map
Location

Gorkovskaya (Russian: Горьковская) is a station on the Nizhny Novgorod Metro and is the northern terminus on the Avtozavodskaya line. It opened on November 4, 2012. It is also the only station on the right bank of the Oka River in the historic Upper City section of Nizhny Novgorod. The station is named for Gorky Square, under which the station is situated. Maxim Gorky was born in Nizhny Novgorod and the city was itself named Gorky until 1990.

== Construction ==
Construction of the station itself took four years and cost 20 billion rubles. The plans for a station in the Upper City were developed in 1987 in conjunction with the planned construction of the Metromost bridge over the Oka. Construction on the bridge started in 1992, but a lack of a financing interrupted the work several times. The work restarted in 2006 with the initial phase opening in 2009.

== Notable landmarks ==
Near the station there are many tourist destinations: Gorky Square, Bolshaya Pokrovskaya Street, Malaya Pokrovskaya Street and Maslyakova Street. From the station you can walk to the Kremlin on the pedestrian Bolshaya Pokrovskaya street.
