= Administrative divisions of Nizhny Novgorod =

Administrative districts of Russian federal subject

Nizhny Novgorod Russia

Administrative structure (as of 2014)
- Cities (parts): 2
- City districts: 8
- Municipal settlements: 18
- Micro-districts: 17

Municipal structure (as of )
- Rural settlements: (inhabited) (uninhabited)

Districts of Nizhny Novgorod: Upper City: █ Nizhegorodsky █ Prioksky █ Sovetsky Lower City: █ Avtozavodsky █ Kanavinsky █ Leninsky █ Moskovsky █ Sormovsky

The city of Nizhny Novgorod, Russia, is divided into two parts (Upper City and Lower City), eight districts, which are in turn subdivided into micro-districts, and municipal settlements.

Upper City - historical and cultural part. Located on the right hilly bank of the Oka River. It is divided into three districts.

Lower City - an industrial and commercial area. Located on the left lowland bank of the Oka River. It is divided into five districts.

== Upper town ==
=== Nizhegorodsky District ===
Name	Population	Photos
Nizhegorodsky District (Нижегородский район)	132,425	The Kremlin
Micro-districts under the district's jurisdiction:		The Kremlin
Kremlin (Кремль)		The Kremlin
Verkhnie Pechory (Верхние Печёры)	40,000	The Kremlin
Usilovsky (Усиловский)		The Kremlin
Municipal settlements under the district's jurisdiction:		The Kremlin
Verkhny Posad (Верхний посад)		The Kremlin
Nizhny Posad (Нижний Посад)		The Kremlin
Novaya (Новая)	384	The Kremlin
Podnovie (Подновье)		The Kremlin
Zelyony Gorod (Зелёный город)	2,469	The Kremlin

=== Prioksky District ===
Name	Population	Photos
Prioksky District (Приокский район)	94,956	
Micro-districts under the district's jurisdiction:
Myza (Мыза)		
Surikovsky (Суриковский)		
Scherbinki (Щербинки)		
Municipal settlements under the district's jurisdiction:
Aleksandrovskie dachi (Александровские дачи)		
Dubyonki (Дубёнки)		
Parkovy posyolok (Парковый посёлок)		
Olgino (Ольгино)		
Stary posyolok (Старый посёлок)		
Mordvintsevo (Мордвинцево)	277	

=== Sovetsky District ===
Name	Population	Photos
Sovetsky District (Советский район)	148,909	
Micro-districts under the district's jurisdiction:
Vysokovo (Высоково)		
Kuznechikha (Кузнечиха)		
Lapshikha (Лапшиха)		
Nagorny (Нагорный)		
Tobolskie Kazarmy (Тобольские Казармы)		
Zapadny gorodok (Западный городок)		
Municipal settlements under the district's jurisdiction:
Kuznechikha village (деревня Кузнечиха)		
Novopokrovskoe (Новопокровское)		
Prigorodny village (Пригородный посёлок)		
Sakharny dol (Сахарный дол)		
Sluda (Слуда)		

== Lower town ==
=== Avtozavodsky District ===
Name	Population	Photos
Avtozavodsky District (Автозаводский район)	300,436	Centre of Avtozavodsky city district
Micro-districts under the district's jurisdiction:		Centre of Avtozavodsky city district
6th (6-й)		Centre of Avtozavodsky city district
35 City block (35 квартал)		Centre of Avtozavodsky city district
43 City block (43 квартал)		Centre of Avtozavodsky city district
52 City block (52 квартал)		Centre of Avtozavodsky city district
Voroshilovsky (Ворошиловский)		Centre of Avtozavodsky city district
Monchegorsky (Мончегорский)		Centre of Avtozavodsky city district
Severny (North) (Северный)		Centre of Avtozavodsky city district
Sotsgorod-I (Соцгород-I)		Centre of Avtozavodsky city district
Sotsgorod-II (Соцгород-II)		Centre of Avtozavodsky city district
Yug (South) (Юг)		Centre of Avtozavodsky city district
Yugo-Zapadny (Southwest) (Юго-Западный)		Centre of Avtozavodsky city district
Municipal settlements under the district's jurisdiction:		Centre of Avtozavodsky city district
Gnilitsy (Гнилицы)		Centre of Avtozavodsky city district
Doskino (Доскино)		Centre of Avtozavodsky city district
Nagulino (Нагулино)		Centre of Avtozavodsky city district
Novoye Doskino (Новое Доскино)		Centre of Avtozavodsky city district
Petryaevka (Петряевка)		Centre of Avtozavodsky city district
Strigino (Стригино) with airport		Centre of Avtozavodsky city district

=== Kanavinsky District ===
Name	Population	Photos
Kanavinsky District (Канавинский район)	300,436	Revolution square and the Main Station
Micro-districts under the district's jurisdiction:		Revolution square and the Main Station
Gordeevsky (Гордеевский)		Revolution square and the Main Station
Krasny yakor (Красный якорь)		Revolution square and the Main Station
Lesnoy gorodok (Лесной городок)		Revolution square and the Main Station
Mescherskoe ozero (Мещерское озеро)		Revolution square and the Main Station
Old Kanavino (Старое Канавино)		Revolution square and the Main Station
Old Sortirovka (Старая Сортировка)		Revolution square and the Main Station
Sortirovochny (Сортировочный)		Revolution square and the Main Station
Sedmoe Nebo (Седьмое Небо)		Revolution square and the Main Station
Teplichny (Тепличный)		Revolution square and the Main Station
Yarmarka (Fair) (Ярмарка)		Revolution square and the Main Station
Municipal settlements under the district's jurisdiction:		Revolution square and the Main Station
Beryozovsky (Берёзовский)		Revolution square and the Main Station
Volodarskogo (Володарского)		Revolution square and the Main Station
Юдинцева (Yudintseva)		Revolution square and the Main Station

=== Leninsky District ===
Name	Population	Photos
Leninsky District (Ленинский район)	141,738	Leninsky city district administration
Micro-districts under the district's jurisdiction:		Leninsky city district administration
Gvozdilny (Гвоздильный)		Leninsky city district administration
Dvigatel' Revolyutsii (Двигатель Революции)		Leninsky city district administration
Ippodrom (Ипподром)		Leninsky city district administration
Karpovsky (Карповский)		Leninsky city district administration
Krasnaya Etna (Красная Этна)		Leninsky city district administration
Molitovsky zaton (Молитовский затон)		Leninsky city district administration
Molitovsky (Молитовский)		Leninsky city district administration
Stankozavod (Станкозавод)		Leninsky city district administration
Municipal settlements under the district's jurisdiction:		Leninsky city district administration
Instrumental'ny (Инструментальный)		Leninsky city district administration
Metallist (Металлист)		Leninsky city district administration

=== Moskovsky District ===
Name	Population	Photos
Moskovsky District (Московский район)	123,893	
Micro-districts under the district's jurisdiction:
Aviatsionny(Авиационный)		
Beryozovsky (Берёзовский)		
Burnakovsky (Бурнаковский)		
Krasnye zori (Красные зори)		
Sormovsky povorot (Сормовский поворот)		
Municipal settlements under the district's jurisdiction:
Beryozovaya poyma (Берёзовая пойма)		
Kalininsky (Калининский)		
Levinka (Левинка)		
Ordzhonikidze (Орджоникидзе)		
Orlovskie dvoriki (Орловские дворики)		

=== Sormovsky District ===
Name	Population	Photos
Sormovsky District (Сормовский район)	166,996	Church of the Transfiguration
Micro-districts under the district's jurisdiction:		Church of the Transfiguration
5th(5-й)		Church of the Transfiguration
6th(6-й)		Church of the Transfiguration
7th (7-й)		Church of the Transfiguration
Dar'ino (Дарьино)		Church of the Transfiguration
Kooperativny (Кооперативный)		Church of the Transfiguration
Novy posyolok (Новый посёлок)		Church of the Transfiguration
Svetloyarsky (Светлоярский)		Church of the Transfiguration
Sormovo centre (Центр Сормова)		Church of the Transfiguration
Municipal settlements under the district's jurisdiction:		Church of the Transfiguration
Volodarsky (Володарский)		Church of the Transfiguration
Vysokovo (Высоково)		Church of the Transfiguration
Dubravny (Дубравный)		Church of the Transfiguration
Komsomolsky (Комсомольский)		Church of the Transfiguration
Narodny (Народный)		Church of the Transfiguration
Pochinki (Починки)		Church of the Transfiguration
Koposovo (Копосово)		Church of the Transfiguration
Tsentral'ny (Центральный)		Church of the Transfiguration
