= Kanavinsky constituency =

Russian legislative constituency

Kanavinsky single-member constituency
- Constituency of the Russian State Duma

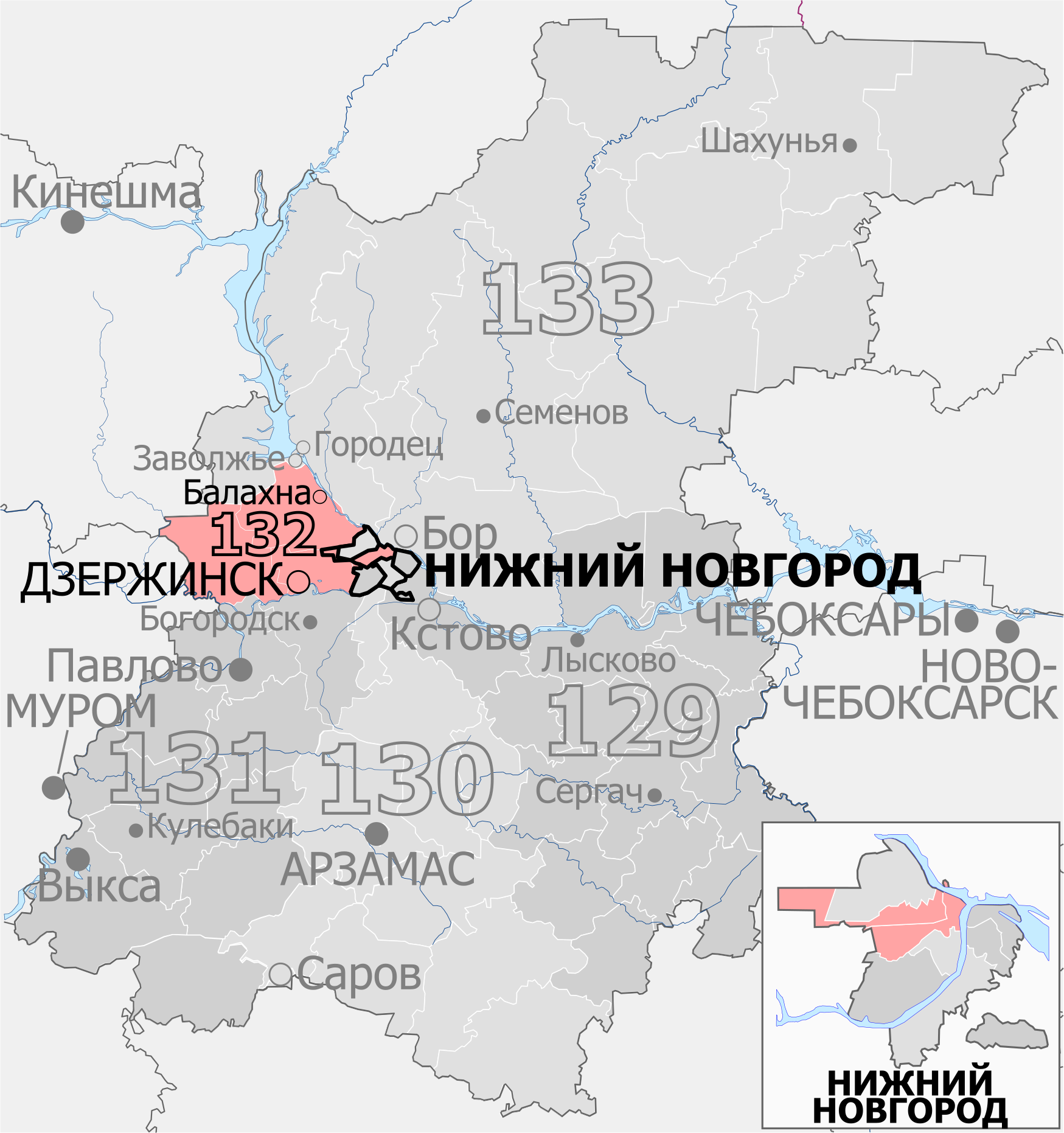
- Constituency boundaries since 2016
- Deputy: Yulia Garevskaya; United Russia
- Federal subject: Nizhny Novgorod Oblast
- Districts: Balakhninsky, Dzerzhinsk, Nizhny Novgorod (Kanavinsky, Moskovsky), Volodarsky
- Voters: 498,841 (2026)

The Kanavinsky constituency (No.134 (Note: No.120 in 1993-2007, No.132 in 2016–2026)) is a Russian legislative constituency in Nizhny Novgorod Oblast. The constituency stretches from central Nizhny Novgorod to western Nizhny Novgorod Oblast, including the city Dzerzhinsk.

The constituency has been represented since 2026 by United Russia deputy Yulia Garevskaya, OB-GYN and Hero of Labour, who won the open seat, succeeding six-term United Russia incumbent Vadim Bulavinov.

== Boundaries ==
1993–1995: Nizhny Novgorod (Kanavinsky, Leninsky, Moskovsky, Sormovsky)
The constituency covered central and northern Nizhny Novgorod on the left bank of Oka.

1995–2007: Nizhny Novgorod (Kanavinsky, Moskovsky, Nizhegorodsky, Sormovsky)
After 1995 the constituency was significantly altered, swapping Leninsky City District for Nizhegorodsky City District with Avtozavodsky constituency.

2016–present: Balakhninsky District, Dzerzhinsk, Nizhny Novgorod (Kanavinsky, Moskovsky), Volodarsky District
The constituency was re-created for the 2016 election and retained only Kanavinsky, Moskovsky city districts, losing Nizhegorodsky City District to Nizhny Novgorod constituency and Sormovsky City District to Bor constituency. This seat was pushed to the west, gaining Dzerzhinsk from the dissolved Dzerzhinsk constituency as well as rural Balakhninsky and Volodarsky districts from the former Semyonov constituency.

== Members elected ==
Election	Member	Party
1993	Vadim Bulavinov	Independent
1995	Olga Beklemishcheva	Yabloko
1999	Vadim Bulavinov (Note: elected Mayor of Nizhny Novgorod in October 2002)	Independent
2003	Lyubomir Tyan	United Russia
2007	Proportional representation - no election by constituency	
2011	Proportional representation - no election by constituency	
2016	Vadim Bulavinov	United Russia
2021	Vadim Bulavinov	United Russia
2026	Yulia Garevskaya	United Russia

== Election results ==
=== 1993 ===
Summary of the 12 December 1993 Russian legislative election in the Kanavinsky constituency
Candidate	Party	Votes	%
Vadim Bulavinov	Independent	41,546	18.35%
Vladimir Yudin	Independent	23,250	10.27%
Valery Lisitsyn	Independent	19,295	8.52%
Aleksandr Perfilyev	Independent	18,791	8.30%
Stanislav Smirnov	Choice of Russia	15,838	7.00%
Viktor Yelchev	Communist Party	13,989	6.18%
Igor Veletminsky	Liberal Democratic Party	11,518	5.09%
Gennady Rumyantsev	Democratic Party	6,190	2.73%
Boris Chernov	Agrarian Party	4,134	1.83%
Sergey Kapterev	Russian Democratic Reform Movement	4,111	1.82%
against all		47,778	21.10%
Total		226,396	100%

=== 1995 ===
Summary of the 17 December 1995 Russian legislative election in the Kanavinsky constituency
Candidate	Party	Votes	%
Olga Beklemishcheva	Yabloko	53,120	18.24%
Vadim Bulavinov (incumbent)	Independent	32,291	11.09%
Andrey Klimentyev	Independent	28,590	9.82%
Aleksandr Malyshko	Communist Party	25,451	8.74%
Sergey Polozkov	Stanislav Govorukhin Bloc	19,311	6.63%
Aleksandr Savin	Independent	11,471	3.94%
Viktor Chechevichkin	Independent	10,310	3.54%
Veniamin Zakharov	Liberal Democratic Party	8,744	3.00%
Nikolay Kruglov	Our Home – Russia	8,570	2.94%
Oleg Kim	Interethnic Union	7,556	2.59%
Ilya Zaslavsky	Democratic Choice of Russia – United Democrats	7,123	2.45%
Vyacheslav Kronsky	Independent	6,511	2.24%
Vladislav Trubnikov	Trade Unions and Industrialists – Union of Labour	5,757	1.98%
Yevgeny Sabashnikov	Independent	5,594	1.92%
Pyotr Tipakov	Communists and Working Russia - for the Soviet Union	5,377	1.85%
Irina Mikhaylovskaya	Party of Russian Unity and Accord	5,174	1.78%
Vladimir Yudin	My Fatherland	4,458	1.53%
Vladimir Khvorostukhin	Independent	4,254	1.46%
Anatoly Mitrofanov	People's Union	2,832	0.97%
Viktor Chumak	Transformation of the Fatherland	1,858	0.64%
against all		28,187	9.68%
Total		291,201	100%

=== 1999 ===
Summary of the 19 December 1999 Russian legislative election in the Kanavinsky constituency
Candidate	Party	Votes	%
Vadim Bulavinov	Independent	77,395	28.62%
Olga Beklemishcheva (incumbent)	Yabloko	46,702	17.27%
Vladimir Pachenov	Independent	40,139	14.84%
Olga Noskova	Fatherland – All Russia	23,032	8.52%
Aleksandr Kosovskikh	Independent	8,331	3.08%
Sergey Speransky	Andrey Nikolayev and Svyatoslav Fyodorov Bloc	8,118	3.00%
Vladimir Kozlov	Independent	7,056	2.61%
Valery Goltsev	Independent	6,716	2.48%
Pyotr Tipakov	Communists and Workers of Russia - for the Soviet Union	4,117	1.52%
Tamara Davletshina	Liberal Democratic Party	2,542	0.94%
Aleksey Svetlichny	Congress of Russian Communities-Yury Boldyrev Movement	2,023	0.75%
Yury Sedov	Our Home – Russia	2,001	0.74%
against all		37,938	14.03%
Total		270,389	100%

=== 2003 ===
Summary of the 7 December 2003 Russian legislative election in the Kanavinsky constituency
Candidate	Party	Votes	%
Lyubomir Tyan	United Russia	60,019	27.71%
Vladimir Pachenov	Communist Party	29,183	13.47%
Aleksandr Bochkarev	Independent	27,401	12.65%
Galina Klochkova	Union of Right Forces	12,745	5.88%
Aleksandr Kurdyumov	Liberal Democratic Party	11,551	5.33%
Vladimir Gorin	Party of Russia's Rebirth-Russian Party of Life	9,457	4.37%
Georgy Ivanov	Independent	6,898	3.18%
Vyacheslav Tarakanov	Yabloko	4,851	2.24%
Tatyana Platonova	Independent	2,199	1.02%
Irina Boychenko	United Russian Party Rus'	1,116	0.52%
Denis Gogolev	Independent	730	0.34%
Vladimir Osin	Independent	576	0.27%
Mikhail Iosilevich	Independent	537	0.25%
Denis Gorbushin	Independent	406	0.19%
against all		46,136	21.30%
Total		217,079	100%

=== 2016 ===
Summary of the 18 September 2016 Russian legislative election in the Kanavinsky constituency
Candidate	Party	Votes	%
Vadim Bulavinov	United Russia	113,127	55.53%
Aleksandr Tarnayev	Communist Party	28,844	14.16%
Anatoly Shein	A Just Russia	15,836	7.77%
Vladislav Atmakhov	Liberal Democratic Party	14,618	7.17%
Sergey Almayev	Rodina	9,426	4.63%
Artur Yeranosyan	Communists of Russia	4,374	2.15%
Andrey Khomov	Yabloko	4,340	2.13%
Sergey Luzin	Party of Growth	3,237	1.59%
Total		203,738	100%

=== 2021 ===
Summary of the 17-19 September 2021 Russian legislative election in the Kanavinsky constituency
Candidate	Party	Votes	%
Vadim Bulavinov (incumbent)	United Russia	86,454	44.80%
Aleksandr Terentyev	Communist Party	45,932	23.80%
Lyubov Soldatkina	A Just Russia — For Truth	17,253	8.94%
Kirill Murygin	New People	12,427	6.44%
Vladislav Atmakhov	Liberal Democratic Party	12,083	6.26%
Dmitry Talnikov	Party of Pensioners	8,526	4.42%
Sergey Neganov	Party of Growth	2,651	1.37%
Total		192,969	100%

=== 2026 ===
Summary of the 18-20 September 2026 Russian legislative election in the Kanavinsky constituency
Candidate	Party	Votes	%
Yulia Garevskaya	United Russia	134,920	51.23%
Aleksandr Terentyev	Communist Party	41,536	15.77%
Kirill Vaganov	Liberal Democratic Party	29,521	11.21%
Pavel Solodkiy	New People	17,970	6.82%
Anastasia Grigoryeva	A Just Russia	13,874	5.27%
Sergey Gorbunov	Yabloko	9,421	3.58%
Valery Leushkin	Party of Pensioners	5,703	2.17%
Tatyana Gryaznova	The Greens	3,410	1.29%
Ilya Yermilov	Rodina	3,174	1.21%
Total		263,373	100%
