= Avtozavodsky constituency =

Russian legislative constituency

Avtozavodsky single-member constituency
- Constituency of the Russian State Duma

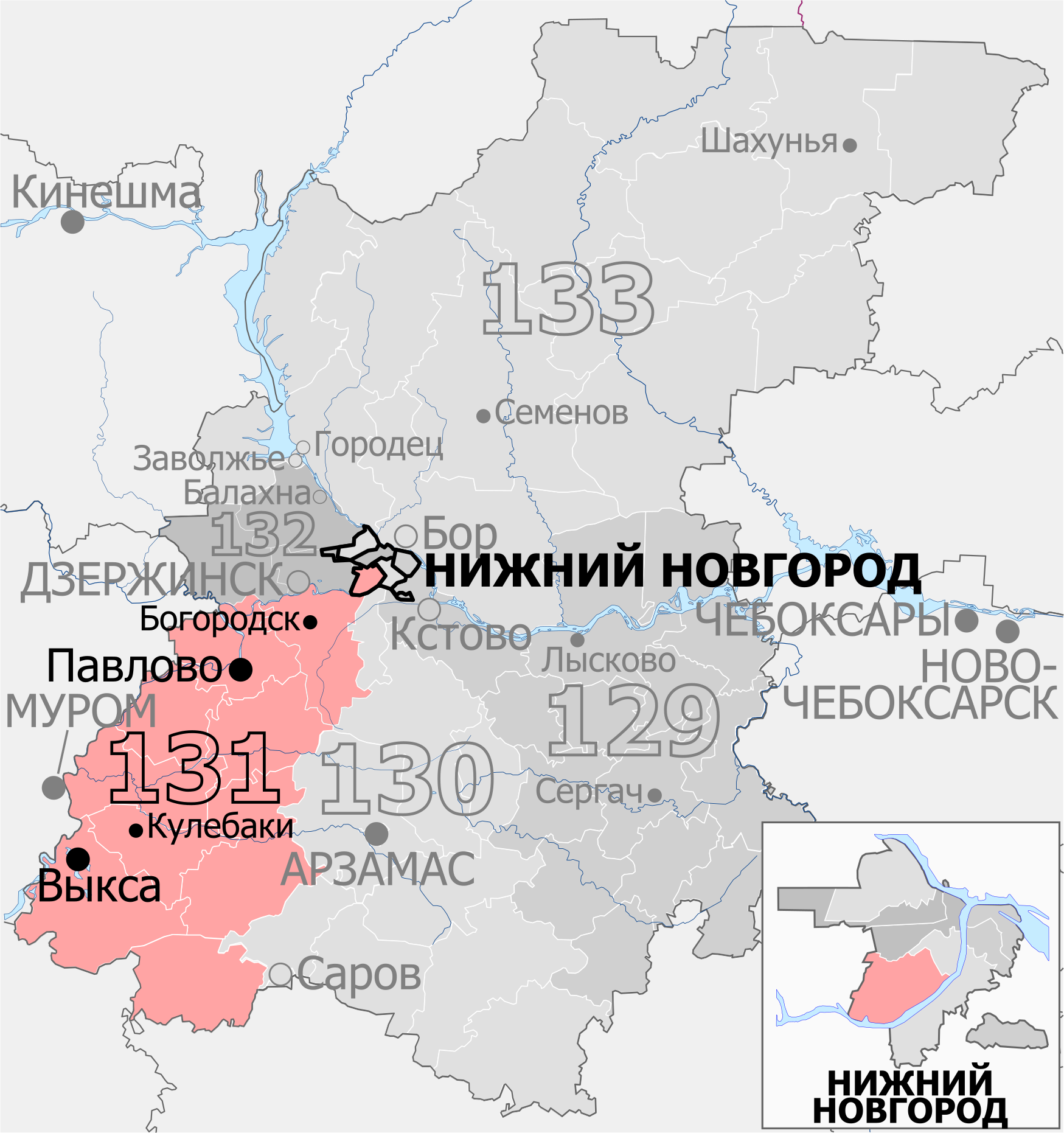
- Constituency boundaries since 2016
- Deputy: Dmitry Grachev; United Russia
- Federal subject: Nizhny Novgorod Oblast
- Districts: Ardatovsky, Bogorodsky (Aleshkovsky, Bogorodsk, Doskinsky, Dudenevsky, Khvoshchevsky, Shapkinsky), Kulebaki, Navashino, Nizhny Novgorod (Avtozavodsky), Pavlovsky, Sosnovsky, Vachsky, Voznesensky, Vyksa
- Voters: 518,799 (2026)

The Avtozavodsky constituency (No.133 (Note: No.117 in 1993-2007, No.131 in 2016–2026)) is a Russian legislative constituency in Nizhny Novgorod Oblast. The constituency stretches from southern Nizhny Novgorod to south-western Nizhny Novgorod Oblast, including the cities Kulebaki, Pavlovo and Vyksa.

The constituency has been represented since 2026 by United Russia deputy Dmitry Grachev, former regional Deputy Minister of Regional and Municipal Policy and retired Russian Army guards lieutenant, who won the open seat, succeeding two-term United Russia incumbent Natalia Nazarova.

== Boundaries ==
1993–1995: Nizhny Novgorod (Avtozavodsky, Nizhegorodsky, Sovetsky)
The constituency covered central and western Nizhny Novgorod.

1995–2007: Nizhny Novgorod (Avtozavodsky, Leninsky, Sovetsky)
After 1995 the constituency was significantly altered, swapping Nizhegorodsky City District for Leninsky City District with Kanavinsky constituency.

2016–present: Ardatovsky District, Bogorodsky District (Aleshkovsky, Bogorodsk, Doskinsky, Dudenevsky, Khvoshchevsky, Shapkinsky), Kulebaki, Navashino, Nizhny Novgorod (Avtozavodsky), Pavlovsky District, Sosnovsky District, Vachsky District, Voznesensky District, Vyksa
The constituency was re-created for the 2016 election and retained only Avtozavodsky City District of Nizhny Novgorod, losing Sovetsky City District to Nizhny Novgorod constituency and Leninsky City District to Prioksky constituency. This seat instead gained most ruralities and towns of the former Dzerzhinsk constituency as well as Kulebaksky, Voznesensky and Vyksunsky districts in the south-western corner from Arzamas constituency.

== Members elected ==
Election	Member	Party
1993	Aleksandr Tsapin	Independent
1995	Pavel Vesyolkin	Our Home – Russia
1999	Boris Nemtsov	Union of Right Forces
2003	Yury Sentyurin (Note: appointed Deputy Minister of Education and Science of Russia in April 2004)	Rodina
2007	Proportional representation - no election by constituency	
2011	Proportional representation - no election by constituency	
2016	Natalia Nazarova	United Russia
2021	Natalia Nazarova	United Russia
2026	Dmitry Grachev	United Russia

== Election results ==
=== 1993 ===
Summary of the 12 December 1993 Russian legislative election in the Avtozavodsky constituency
Candidate	Party	Votes	%
Aleksandr Tsapin	Independent	81,060	34.87%
Sergey Speransky	Independent	24,708	10.63%
Nikolay Ashin	Independent	21,196	9.12%
Tatyana Kuzmina	Independent	9,789	4.21%
Yevgeny Zagryadsky	Choice of Russia	9,254	3.98%
Aleksey Svetlichny	Independent	7,519	3.23%
Vladimir Danilov	Independent	6,342	2.73%
Nikolay Ryabov	Independent	6,247	2.69%
Aleksandr Ivanov	Yavlinsky–Boldyrev–Lukin	5,727	2.46%
Anatoly Slyusarev	Independent	5,651	2.43%
Mikhail Dikin	Independent	5,514	2.37%
Gennady Gabov	Independent	2,333	1.00%
Veniamin Lavrichev	Party of Russian Unity and Accord	1,511	0.65%
against all		30,179	12.98%
Total		232,468	100%

=== 1995 ===
Summary of the 17 December 1995 Russian legislative election in the Avtozavodsky constituency
Candidate	Party	Votes	%
Pavel Vesyolkin	Our Home – Russia	116,932	38.81%
Nikolay Ryabov	Communist Party	30,244	10.04%
Gennady Rumyantsev	Stanislav Govorukhin Bloc	19,479	6.47%
Aleksey Svetlichny	Congress of Russian Communities	14,886	4.94%
Vyacheslav Cherkunov	Independent	11,492	3.81%
Vladimir Ivanov	Independent	11,472	3.81%
Viktor Mikhaylov	Communists and Working Russia - for the Soviet Union	11,155	3.70%
Aleksey Vasilyev	Derzhava	10,353	3.44%
Lev Chirkov	Liberal Democratic Party	9,259	3.07%
Yevgeny Gladkikh	Interethnic Union	7,363	2.44%
against all		47,550	15.78%
Total		301,279	100%

=== 1999 ===
Summary of the 19 December 1999 Russian legislative election in the Avtozavodsky constituency
Candidate	Party	Votes	%
Boris Nemtsov	Union of Right Forces	117,120	39.20%
Boris Vidyayev	Independent	113,451	37.98%
Nadezhda Zakhtarenko	Andrey Nikolayev and Svyatoslav Fyodorov Bloc	16,525	5.52%
Mikhail Mirny	Independent	4,234	1.42%
Viktor Barinov	Liberal Democratic Party	3,504	1.17%
Vladimir Shubin	Congress of Russian Communities-Yury Boldyrev Movement	2,520	0.84%
Vladimir Prytkov	Independent	2,005	0.67%
Vladimir Chumak	Independent	1,771	0.59%
Yury Krasavtsev	Spiritual Heritage	1,457	0.49%
against all		31,553	10.56%
Total		298,741	100%

=== 2003 ===
Summary of the 7 December 2003 Russian legislative election in the Avtozavodsky constituency
Candidate	Party	Votes	%
Yury Sentyurin	Rodina	83,680	39.03%
Yury Lebedev	Independent	21,618	10.08%
Tatyana Kuzmina	United Russia	16,214	7.56%
Aleksandr Torkhov	Communist Party	13,937	6.50%
Dmitry Birman	Development of Enterprise	11,989	5.59%
Andrey Tarasov	Independent	11,884	5.54%
Vasily Pushkin	Independent	8,765	4.09%
Dmitry Bibikov	Yabloko	5,173	2.41%
Vladislav Kats	Liberal Democratic Party	3,291	1.54%
Viktor Chumak	Independent	2,736	1.28%
Sergey Vershinin	Independent	1,495	0.70%
Ilya Sarov	Independent	1,072	0.50%
Yevgeny Berkov	United Russian Party Rus'	681	0.32%
against all		29,242	13.64%
Total		214,606	100%

=== 2016 ===
Summary of the 18 September 2016 Russian legislative election in the Avtozavodsky constituency
Candidate	Party	Votes	%
Natalia Nazarova	United Russia	118,572	50.45%
Nikolay Ryabov	Communist Party	30,877	13.14%
Aleksandr Razumovsky	A Just Russia	22,132	9.42%
Mikhail Shatilov	Liberal Democratic Party	17,993	7.65%
Vyacheslav Burmistrov	People's Freedom Party	9,871	4.20%
Aleksandr Kosovskikh	Party of Growth	4,968	2.11%
Vladimir Ponomarev	Rodina	4,928	2.10%
Nazhia Fazulzhanova	Communists of Russia	4,817	2.05%
Igor Goncharov	Yabloko	4,364	1.86%
Yevgeny Smirnov	The Greens	3,403	1.45%
Ilya Pomeratsev	Civilian Power	2,101	0.89%
Total		235,051	100%

=== 2021 ===
Summary of the 17-19 September 2021 Russian legislative election in the Avtozavodsky constituency
Candidate	Party	Votes	%
Natalia Nazarova (incumbent)	United Russia	116,773	46.09%
Oleg Kiritsa	Communist Party	53,997	21.31%
Inna Gorislavtseva	A Just Russia — For Truth	22,128	8.73%
Aleksandr Sidelnikov	Liberal Democratic Party	14,165	5.59%
Rustam Dosayev	New People	13,127	5.18%
Sergey Timofeyev	Party of Pensioners	12,889	5.09%
Maksim Petrov	Rodina	5,813	2.29%
Yelena Shershakova	Party of Growth	4,039	1.59%
Total		253,341	100%

=== 2026 ===
Summary of the 18-20 September 2026 Russian legislative election in the Avtozavodsky constituency
Candidate	Party	Votes	%
Dmitry Grachev	United Russia	183,034	55.90%
Mikhail Rykhtik	Communist Party	48,009	14.66%
Aleksandr Sidelnikov	Liberal Democratic Party	30,163	9.21%
Oleg Gusarovsky	New People	25,674	7.84%
Dmitry Amelin	A Just Russia	21,002	6.41%
Aleksey Rizovatov	Party of Pensioners	9,185	2.81%
Maksim Chertanovsky	Rodina	4,560	1.39%
Total		327,428	100%
