= Vladimir Guryanov =

Russian serial killer (born 1964)

- Born: Vladimir Nikolayevich Guryanov; March 27, 1962 (age 64); Saransk, Mordovian ASSR, RSFSR
- Other names: "The Bloody Sectarian" "The Russian Clyde" "Prince Vladimir" "The Black Prince"
- Convictions: Murder x13 Attempted murder x4 Rape; Robbery x11
- Penalty: 4 years imprisonment (2003); Life imprisonment (2010)

Details
- Victims: 13+
- Span of crimes: 2007–2008
- Country: Russia
- State: Nizhny Novgorod
- Date apprehended: September 3, 2008
- Imprisoned at: Black Dolphin Prison, Sol-Iletsk, Orenburg Oblast

Vladimir Nikolayevich Guryanov (Russian: Владимир Николаевич Гурьянов; born March 27, 1964) is a Russian serial killer and rapist who, together with accomplice Elvira Leonidovna Egorycheva (Russian: Эльвирой Леонидовной Егорычевой; born May 5, 1962), committed at least 13 murders in Nizhny Novgorod between 2007 and 2008. The pair were both convicted of the crimes, with Guryanov receiving a life sentence while Egorycheva received a 19.5-year term.

As the motive behind the attacks was religious in nature, Guryanov and Egorycheva were nicknamed The Bloody Sectarians (Russian: Кровавые сектанты), as well as The Russian Bonnie and Clyde (Russian: Российские Бонни и Клайд).

== Early life ==
Little is known about Guryanov's early life. Born on March 27, 1964, in Saransk, Mordovian ASSR, he graduated from school with a specialized secondary education, got married in the mid-1980s and had a child. To people around him, he held a reputation as a creative artist who initially made a living by reselling copies of ancient icons, but later on opened a workshop in Ivanovo where he made lacquer miniatures and finely crafted music boxes. Following the collapse of the USSR and the subsequent economic reforms, Guryanov's family began to experience financial difficulties, so in the early 1990s, he began stealing and was eventually jailed for car theft.

=== Meeting Egorycheva ===
Upon his release in 1995, Guryanov began to show signs of mental illness, as a result of which he divorced his wife and abandoned his family, deciding to live on the streets as a vagrant. Later that year, he became a Jehovah's Witness.

In 1999, while at a meeting, Guryanov met Elvira Egorycheva, a widow from Cheboksary who joined the Jehovah's Witnesses following the death of her husband. The two became friends in the following years, but after getting into some sort of conflict with other members, both of them stopped attending meetings.

=== First crime and downward spiral ===
In 2003, Guryanov was arrested for rape. Shortly after the arrest, he demanded that he had supposedly committed the crime on religious grounds and demanded to be released due to his alleged insanity, but a forensic psychiatric examination ruled him to be sane. As a result, he was found guilty at a subsequent trial and sentenced to 4 years imprisonment. Egorycheva served as his civil defense counsel.

After serving the sentence in full, Guryanov was released on December 10, 2007, and returned to Saransk, where he lived in a shared apartment with Egorycheva. At that time, she suffered from a Messiah complex and exhibited strange behavior, despite having a higher education, three children and having previously earned a high salary as a seamstress. While Guryanov was still behind bars, Egorycheva spent all her money on visiting him. One neighbor said that she essentially abandoned her children, often preached about the end of the world and allowed "strange people" to enter her apartment and sing religious songs.

Following Guryanov's return, he and Egorycheva dedicated themselves to their own religious beliefs, most of which borrowed various aspects from a number of religious doctrines. For example, both stopped referring to each other by their first names, with Guryanov calling Egorycheva "Mother", with her in turn calling him "[Her] son, Prince Vladimir". This stemmed from Guryanov claiming that he was descended from the Rurikids and had a divine mission to "cleanse the world of evil". Under Guryanov's influence, Egorycheva changed her name to Elena Ryurikova-Alekseyeva.

While still in prison, Guryanov managed to convince Egorycheva of his beliefs. After his release, the pair moved to Nizhny Novgorod, where they stayed with a relative of Guryanov's. Not long after, the pair started committing murders.

== Murders ==
=== Initial killings ===
Between December 27, 2007, and September 3, 2008, Guryanov and Elgorycheva committed at least 13 murders involving rape or robbery, using a pair of revolvers, three knives and a stun gun. Their modus operandi varied depending on the attack, with Egorycheva occasionally recording the atrocities on a mobile phone.

The pair's first victim was 66-year-old gypsy fortune teller Antonina Mashkatova, who placed advertisements about her services in the local newspaper. On December 27, 2007, Guryanov and Egorycheva went to her apartment on Pavlova Street on the pretense of using her services where, after making sure that was nobody else in the residence, they attacked her. During the assault, Guryanov stabbed her multiple times, and after killing her, he and Egorycheva stole some jewelry which they later sold at a pawnshop.

The next day, following the same pattern, Guryanov and Egorycheva visited the apartment of Lyudmila Kostina, another fortune teller. After Guryanov stabbed her to death, he and his accomplice stole money and personal items from the residence and then fled.

In early January 2008, Guryanov and Egorycheva responded to a newspaper advertisement from 38-year-old Elena Danilova, a purebred breeder. After calling the listed number, the pair set up a meeting with Danilova. When they met, they threatened to kill her and forced the woman to a deserted area, where Guryanov proceeded to beat, rape and then stab her to death.

On January 10, Guryanov stabbed to death Roman Vikharev, a cab driver for the Mustang Cab Company. He then stole his cellphone and some money, leaving passers-by to discover the victim's body inside his Kia Spectra on Internatsionalnaya Street.

On March 19, Guryanov and Egorycheva attacked 36-year-old Natalia Burenkova, an accountant for Kitkar LLC, inside a garage in the Leninsky City District. After raping the woman, Guryanov stabbed her to death by inflicting multiple wounds to her chest.

=== Second spree ===
In the spring of 2008, Guryanov and Egorycheva moved to the outskirts of Nizhny Novgorod and committed their later crimes in the forest belt adjacent to Kanavino and Avtozavod, where there are predominantly dachas. During this time, they lived in an abandoned house and earned their living via petty theft. Between May and August, Guryanov committed six additional murders, burying the remains of three victims (Maslennikova, Kotelnikova and Lomteva) in shallow graves, as a result of which they were classified as missing persons until the killers were arrested.

Maria Maslennikova, an 18-year-old volleyball player, disappeared on the night of May 2 to 3, while she was en route to meet a friend at Avtozavodsky Park. She was attacked when she took a shortcut, with Guryanov shooting her in the head, then proceeding to rape, beat her to death with a hammer and then threw her down a well. On July 21, 45-year-old Lyudmila Kotelnikova left home at 4 AM and headed to her workplace, passing along an underpass leading from Perekhnikova Street to the Komsomolskaya gatehouse of GAZ OAO, but never showed up for work.

On August 3, at about 11 PM, Guryanov and Egorycheva attacked 37-year-old Elena Lomteva and her friend 40-year-old Elena Krivegina at the abandoned garden plots near Orlovka Station, where the two women had gone to pick apples. After killing Lomteva, the killers took Krivegina to a deserted area near the Kustovaya-429 Kilometer crossing, where Guryanov raped and shot her dead. The perpetrators then left the body near a utility pole.

Just a few days after the double murder, they killed a woman named Yulia Malova in a nearby area. After the murder, the pair stole money and valuables, as well as a plushie that Malova intended to gift to her son. On August 18, Guryanov and Egorycheva attacked 48-year-old accountant Elena Travkina at the Urozhay garden association, with Guryanov raping and shooting her to death in the process.

== Investigation ==
The investigation of the criminal case was entrusted to an investigation team composed of three employees for the Investigative Committee of the Prosecutor's Office for the Nizhny Novgorod Region, as well as four investigators from territorial departments. The team also involved employees of the 1st Investigative Department of the Main Department of Internal Affairs of the Nizhny Novgorod Region, in addition to at least 40 officers involved in daily search operations.

During the process of the investigation, law enforcement officers checked all pawnshops in the city, as one of the victims' jewelry had been pawned. Based on entries in the logbook, it was noted that the jewelry was brought to the pawnshop by a woman claiming to be Natalia Burenkova on the exact date she was killed. The shop's employees said that this same woman later returned and pawned other items, and when said items were presented to other victims' family members, they were positively identified as belonging to Mashkatova, Kostina and Burenkova.

One of the employees subsequently provided a description of the woman and a man accompanying her, of which two facial composites were made. After these were distributed across Nizhny Novgorod, the police were contacted by a relative of Guryanov who identified him and Egorycheva as the two people from the drawings. In his statement, the man said that the pair had lived in a rented apartment he owned since late 2007 and did not exhibit any outwardly questionable behavior, but also did not work. He later revealed that he kicked out Guryanov and Egorycheva in the spring of 2008 after they refused to pay their rent. Using this information, all available information about the two suspects was distributed across police stations and private security companies in Nizhny Novgorod.

== Arrest and confessions ==
On September 3, 2008, Guryanov and Egorycheva were shopping at a supermarket when they were recognized by security guard Oleg Filippov and his partner. Unwilling to attempt to arrest them in a large crowd, the two men approached the couple when they exited a salesroom, accused them of stealing chewing gum and escorted them to the service room. In there, they twisted their arms and pinned them to the floor, whereupon Filippov searched them and found an abundance of illegal items on both.

After completing the search, Filippov and his partner found the following items: a holster containing two Nagant M1895 revolvers; three knives; a Gyurza stun gun; payphone cards; gold jewelry; a Nokia N95 (later assumed to belong to victim Roman Vikharev); an LG B1300 cellphone (later assumed to belong to victim Lyudmila Kostina) and duct tape.

Following this, the pair were taken to the nearest police station, where Guryanov soon implicated himself in 13 murders. In the following weeks, he and Egorycheva took part in investigative experiments and were taken under escort to show the burial sites of some victims. In the midst of this, Guryanov was also interrogated about his motive, concerning which he said that all the killings and rapes were done for religious reasons. According to him, all the women he killed were done at the behest of God, with Guryanov believing that they all would be his wives in the afterlife.

Following these claims, Guryanov's claims and sanity were both questioned. In October 2008, head investigator Vladimir Stravinskas released a statement in which he speculated that the pair might have been additionally motivated by lust, and that a psychiatrist had been appointed to evaluate the suspects' mental health.

== Trial and convictions ==
In February 2009, deputy head investigator Leonid Denisov announced at a press conference that both Guryanov and Egorycheva would be brought to trial. In mid-2009, both were given a forensic psychiatric evaluation, from which both suspects were ruled sane to stand trial.

Ultimately, based on the evidence gathered by the various agencies, Guryanov and Egorycheva were charged with 13 murders, 4 attempted murders, 10 rapes and sexual assaults, and 11 robberies. Among the surviving victims were two men and two teenagers, with one of the teens having suffered from a gunshot wound because Guryanov did not like his attitude.

On January 19, 2010, a jury at the Nizhny Novgorod Regional Court unanimously found both Guryanov and Egorycheva guilty on all counts and recommended that no leniency be provided in this case. As such, on February 12, Guryanov received a life sentence while Egorycheva received a sentence of 19 years and 6 months imprisonment. During sentencing, they both sat hugging each other and talking animatedly about something, paying no attention to what was going on.

The supposed religious motive for the killings was heavily doubted by investigators. One of them, Denis Kuznetsov, stated his belief that it was all a sham and the pair were financially motivated, while another, Andrei Kirillov, referred to them as "extremely cynical and cold-blooded".

== Current status ==
Following his conviction, Guryanov was transferred to serve his life sentence at the Black Dolphin Prison. In 2012, he gave an interview to journalists who visited him, stating that he had no desire to start his life anew and was satisfied with prison; that he has dedicated his time to art, and that he prayed that God would punish the lawless.

There is no information about Egorycheva's current detainment or status.

== See also ==
- List of Russian serial killers

== In the media and culture ==
- The crimes were covered on the episode The Black Prince (Russian: Чёрный князь) from the documentary series Criminal Chronicles (Russian: Криминальные хроники)
