= Sormovo =

Sormovo may refer to:

- Sormovo (airfield), an airfield near Nizhny Novgorod, Russia
- Sormovsky City District (formerly a separate city of Sormovo in 1920s), a city district of Nizhny Novgorod, Russia

== See also ==
- Sormovsky (disambiguation)
- Krasnoye Sormovo
