= Sormovsky =

Sormovsky (masculine), Sormovskaya (feminine), or Sormovskoye (neuter) is an adjective form of Sormovo, a neighborhood within the Russian city of Nizhny Novgorod. They may refer to:

- Sormovsky City District, a city district of Nizhny Novgorod, Russia
- Sormovskaya Line, a line of the Nizhny Novgorod Metro that will one day reach Sormovo.
- Sormovskiy, a type of general cargo ships from Russia.

== See also ==
- Sormovo (disambiguation)
