= Vadim Bulavinov =

Russian politician (born 1963)

- Вадим Булавинов
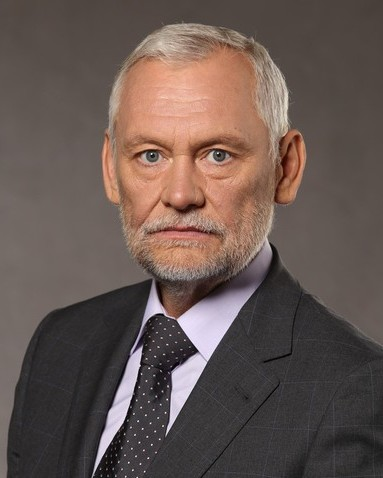

Member of the State Duma for Nizhny Novgorod Oblast
- Incumbent
- Assumed office 5 October 2016
- Preceded by: constituency re-established
- In office 18 January 2000 – 3 October 2002
- Preceded by: Olga Beklemishcheva
- Succeeded by: Lyubomir Tyan
- In office 11 January 1994 – 22 December 1995
- Preceded by: constituency established
- Succeeded by: Olga Beklemishcheva
- Constituency: Kanavinsky (No. 130) (Note: No.120 in 1993-2007)

Member of the State Duma (Party List Seat)
- In office 30 December 2010 – 5 October 2016

Mayor of Nizhny Novgorod
- In office 29 September 2002 – 20 October 2010
- Preceded by: Yury Lebedev
- Succeeded by: Oleg Sorokin

Personal details
- Born: 20 March 1963 (age 62) Gorky, RSFSR, Soviet Union
- Party: United Russia (from 2004); People's Party of the Russian Federation (1999–2002)
- Education: All-Union Correspondence Institute of Law

Vadim Yevgenyevich Bulavinov (Russian: Вади́м Евге́ньевич Була́винов; born 20 March 1963) is a Russian politician.

== Biography ==
Vadim Bulavinov was born in 1963 in Sormovo district of Gorky to a family of steelmaker and kindergarten employee. After graduating from Gorky school No. 117 he worked as a locksmith at Krasnoye Sormovo shipyard. After being conscripted in the Soviet Army Bulavinov served in the Northern Group of Forces as a tanker. In 1985 he joined the separate battalion of militsiya responsible for the private security. In 1990 he graduated from the All-Union Correspondence Institute of Law.

In 1996–99 Bulavinov was general director of Seti-NN TV station.

On 16 June 2014, Bulavinov was taken to the medical unit of Domodedovo Airport, because he could not leave the plane on his own, which arrived from Alicante, Spain. The media reported that lawmaker was allegedly in a state of intoxication and was removed from the aircraft due to "incorrect behavior." Bulavinov himself said that he felt unwell after arriving at the airport. On 4 July, he was relieved of his post as head of the Volga Interregional Coordinating Council of the United Russia party. In November 2017 Bulavinov became secretary of Nizhny Novgorod regional branch of the party. He was forced to resign three weeks later as he was detained by traffic police for drunk driving.

On 11 July 2023, Bulavinov's ex-wife went to the police with complaints about the beatings she had received. Upon learning that the ex-husband plans to throw out her things, she came to collect them and faced aggression. Three days later, the deputy publicly apologized. The reaction of law enforcement agencies is not yet known.

== Political career ==
In 1993 Bulavinov was elected to the 1st State Duma in the Kanavinsky constituency. He was a member of the "Liberal Democratic Union on December 12" and "Stability" factions. From 1995 to 1999 he was a member of the Nizhny Novgorod City Duma, chairing the local self-government committee.

In December 1999, he was elected member of the 3rd State Duma. He was deputy chairman of the "People's Deputy" faction. In 1997 and 2001 Bulavinov was nominated for governor of Nizhny Novgorod Oblast, finishing third in both races.

On 29 September 2002 Bulavinov was elected mayor of Nizhny Novgorod and joined the United Russia party. In 2002 he was awarded the medal of the Order "For Merit to the Fatherland", II degree. On 16 October 2005 he was re-elected for a second term, gaining more than 77.5% of the vote. His term ended in October 2010. According to the new law, the head of the city administration was now to be hired under a contract. Governor Valery Shantsev refused to nominate Bulavinov for now ceremonial post of mayor, saying that he "cannot give an impetus to the dynamic development of the city in the future."

On 30 December 2010, three months after Bulavinov's mayoral term expired, he took the seat of the resigned State Duma member Valery Kornilov. In 2011 he was elected to the 6th State Duma, listed second on the United Russia's regional list after Valery Shantsev. In 2016 and 2021 Bulavinov won the Kanavinsky constituency.

In January 2013, the Investigative Committee requested the Prosecutor General's Office to send a motion to the lower house to lift Bulavinov's parliamentary immunity for abuse of power during his mayoralty. However, the prosecutor's office ignored investigators' request.

In 2016 he was elected to the 7th State Duma (United Russia). He became Deputy Chairman of the Committee on Housing Policy and Housing and Communal Services.

On September 19, 2021 Bulavinov was elected to the 8th State Duma (United Russia).

== Legislative Activity ==
From 1999 to 2019, during his tenure as a deputy of the State Duma of the III, V, VI, and VII convocations, he co-authored 69 legislative initiatives and amendments to draft federal laws.

== Abuse of Power ==
On October 15, 2010, a criminal case was opened against Bulavinov on charges of abuse of official powers in connection with the construction of the Fantastika shopping center.

On January 30, 2013, the Investigative Committee of the Russian Federation announced the preparation of documents to be submitted to the State Duma regarding the removal of Vadim Bulavinov’s parliamentary immunity due to established facts of abuse of official authority during his time as mayor of Nizhny Novgorod. According to case materials, Vadim Bulavinov, in exchange for his son Yevgeny being included among the founders of LLC “Start-Stroy” and “Delta-Stroy” with a 22.25% ownership share, exempted these companies from the mandatory municipal payment of 7% of the completed Fantastika shopping and entertainment complex’s value. Vadim Bulavinov stated that he does not consider himself guilty and is willing to undergo a lie detector test to verify his statements.

=== Sanctions ===
He was sanctioned by the UK government in 2022 in relation to the Russo-Ukrainian War.
