= Natalia Nazarova (politician) =

Russian politician

- Наталья Назарова
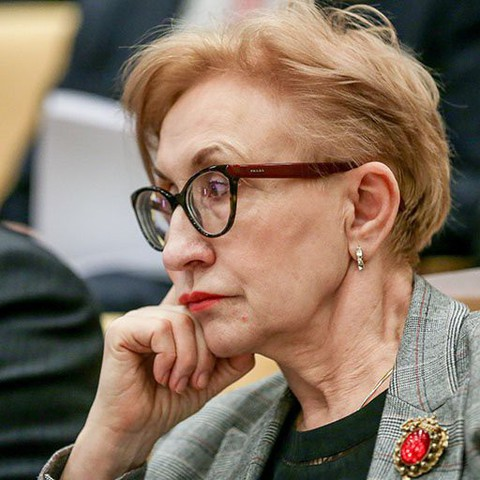

Member of the State Duma for Nizhny Novgorod Oblast
- Incumbent
- Assumed office 12 October 2021
- Preceded by: constituency re-established
- Constituency: Avtozavodsky (No. 131)

Personal details
- Born: 22 December 1953 (age 72) Migninsky, Yermakovsky District, Krasnoyarsk Krai, RSFSR, USSR
- Party: United Russia
- Education: Krasnoyarsk State Technical University

Natalia Vasilievna Nazarova (Russian: Наталья Васильевна Назарова; born 22 December 1953, Tbilisi) is a Russian political figure, former mayor of Nizhnekamsk and a deputy of the 8th State Duma.

From 1979 to 2004, Nazarova worked at the GAZ, first as a planning office engineer and then as head of the energy sales department. From 2004 to 2009, she was the general director of the Volgaenergosbyt. In 2016, she became the deputy of the 7th State Duma and, during the period of her service, Nazarova co-authored 69 legislative initiatives. On September 18, 2021, she was elected deputy of the 8th State Duma.
