= Sokol Aircraft Plant =

Aircraft manufacturer

- Native name: Авиастроительный завод «Сокол»
- Company type: PJSC
- Industry: Aircraft industry
- Founded: 1932; 94 years ago
- Headquarters: 56.323040°N 43.855291°E, Nizhny Novgorod, NIZ, Russia
- Key people: Sergey Korotkov
- Products: Military and civil aviation
- Revenue: $3.554 billion (2011)
- Net income: $1.618 billion (2011)
- Parent: Mikoyan (UAC)
- Website: sokolplant.ru

Sokol Aircraft Plant (Russian: Авиастроительный завод «Сокол», romanized: Aviastroitelny zavod Sokol, lit. 'Sokol Aircraft-Building Plant') is a manufacturer of MiG fighters, based in Nizhny Novgorod. It was founded in 1932 and is also known as "Aviation Plant Nr. 21", named after Sergo Ordzhonikidze. During 45 years of serial production the plant manufactured about 13,500 combat aircraft.

The company is headquartered in Nizhny Novgorod. Their main production facility, with the adjacent airfield (known in the west as Sormovo Airfield) is located on the western outskirts of the city, in Moskovsky City District. For a long time, it was considered that district's most important industrial enterprise and main employer. The "Sormovo" appellation attached to the plant's air field may be because formerly (1956–1970) today's Moskovsky District was part of the Sormovo District.

To help financing, Sokol diversified after the Cold War and during the financially desperate 1990s in Russia. Hardly anybody ordered new fighter jets, so Sokol even produced cutlery to become less dependent of the aviation sector. From 2006, Sokol encouraged flight tourism for MiG-29 and MiG-31 flights in order to earn some additional income.

The Sokol company is seen as the future manufacturer of MiG-35 jets.

== List of aircraft currently in production ==
- MiG-29UB (1984–present), MiG-29UBT
- MiG-31
- Yakovlev Yak-130 (development 1996, 2009–present)
- Myasishchev M-101T Gzhel/Sokol
- Akkord-201 light twin aircraft
- Sokol sea cutter
- Volga-2 WIG aircraft

== List of aircraft formerly in production ==
- Polikarpov I-5 (1932-1934), I-16, (since 1934, 22 modifications)
- Lavochkin LaGG-3, La-5, La-7, La-15 (1948-1949)
- Mikoyan-Gurevich MiG-15 (1949-1952)
- MiG-17 (1952-1954)
- MiG-19 (1955-1957)
- MiG-21 (1959-1985), MiG-21-93
- MiG-25 (1969-1985)
- MiG-31 (1979-1994), MiG-31BM
