= Sormovo Airfield =

Nizhny Novgorod Sormovo Аэродром Нижний Новгород (Сормово) Нижегородского авиационного завода "Сокол"
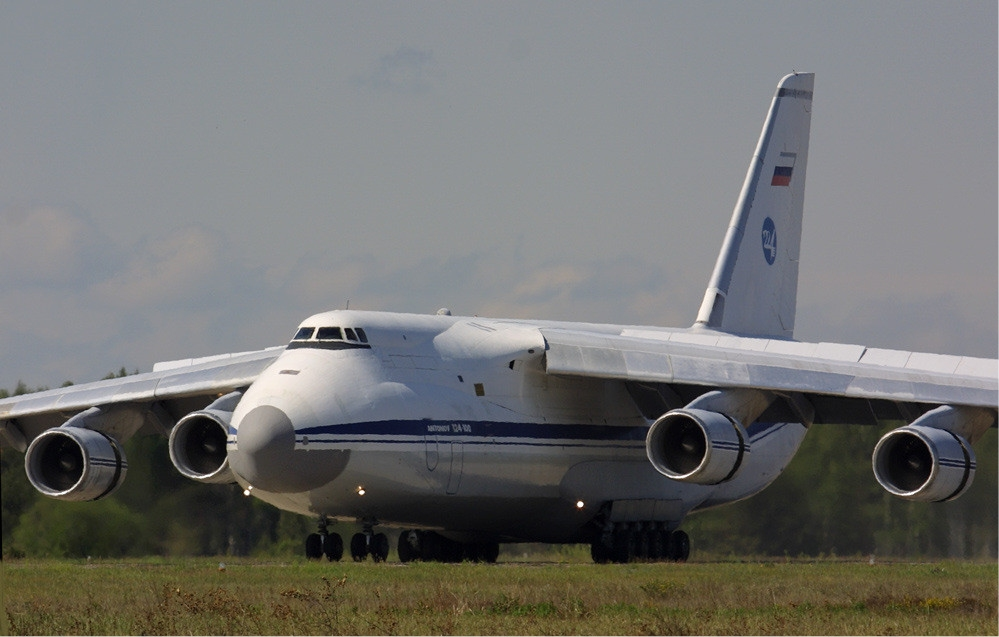
- Antonov An-124 of 224th Flight Unit at Sormovo Airfield in Nizhny Novgorod
- IATA: none; ICAO: XUDS

Summary
- Airport type: Experimental Aviation (used by the aircraft manufacturing plant)
- Operator: UAC (Joint Stock Company «United Aircraft Corporation»)
- Serves: Nizhny Novgorod Sokol Aircraft Plant
- Location: Moskovsky District, Nizhny Novgorod
- Elevation AMSL: 249 ft / 76 m
- Coordinates: 56°19′6″N 043°47′42″E
- Website: https://web.archive.org/web/20090227111328/http://www.sokolplant.ru/en/
- Interactive map of Nizhny Novgorod Sormovo

Runways
Direction	Length		Surface
Direction	ft	m	Surface
06/24	9,678	2,950	Concrete

Sormovo (or Gorkiy Sormovo) is an airfield in Russia, located on the outskirts of Nizhny Novgorod, some 8 km (5.0 mi) from the center city, just west of the Sokol Aircraft Plant. Legally, it is within the city's Moskovsky District (Московский район), but it is commonly referred to by the name of the much better-known neighborhood of Sormovo, which is to the north of the airfield. Moreover, between 1956 and 1970 the airfield (and all of today's Moskovsky District) was in fact part of the Sormovsky District.

According to the Western sources, it is a military base with MiG-25 and MiG-31 aircraft. The runway dimensions suggest that this airfield was built in the 1950s as a bomber base.

As of 2000, Google Earth high-resolution satellite images showed 14 MiG-25, 6 MiG-21, and a small number of older fighters and fixed-wing aircraft. The west side of the runway has a 50-m (164-ft) displaced threshold; the actual runway dimension is 3000 m (9840 ft).

Locally, the airfield is known as Airfield Nizhny Novgorod (Sormovo) (Russian: аэродром Нижний Новгород (Сормово)) of the Nizhny Novgorod Sokol Aviation Plant (Russian: Нижегородский авиационный завод «Сокол»). According to Sokol's website, the plant currently manufactures MiG-31E fighter-interceptors, MiG-29UB fighter-trainers, and Yak-130 combat trainers; they also upgrade customers' MiG-21 BIS planes, and manufacture small civilian airplanes (M-101T, a light passenger turboprop, and Accord-201, an amphibious aircraft). The factory premises are adjacent to the eastern end of the airfield.
