= Avtozavodsky City District, Nizhny Novgorod =

Avtozavodsky District Автозаводский район (Russian)
- District
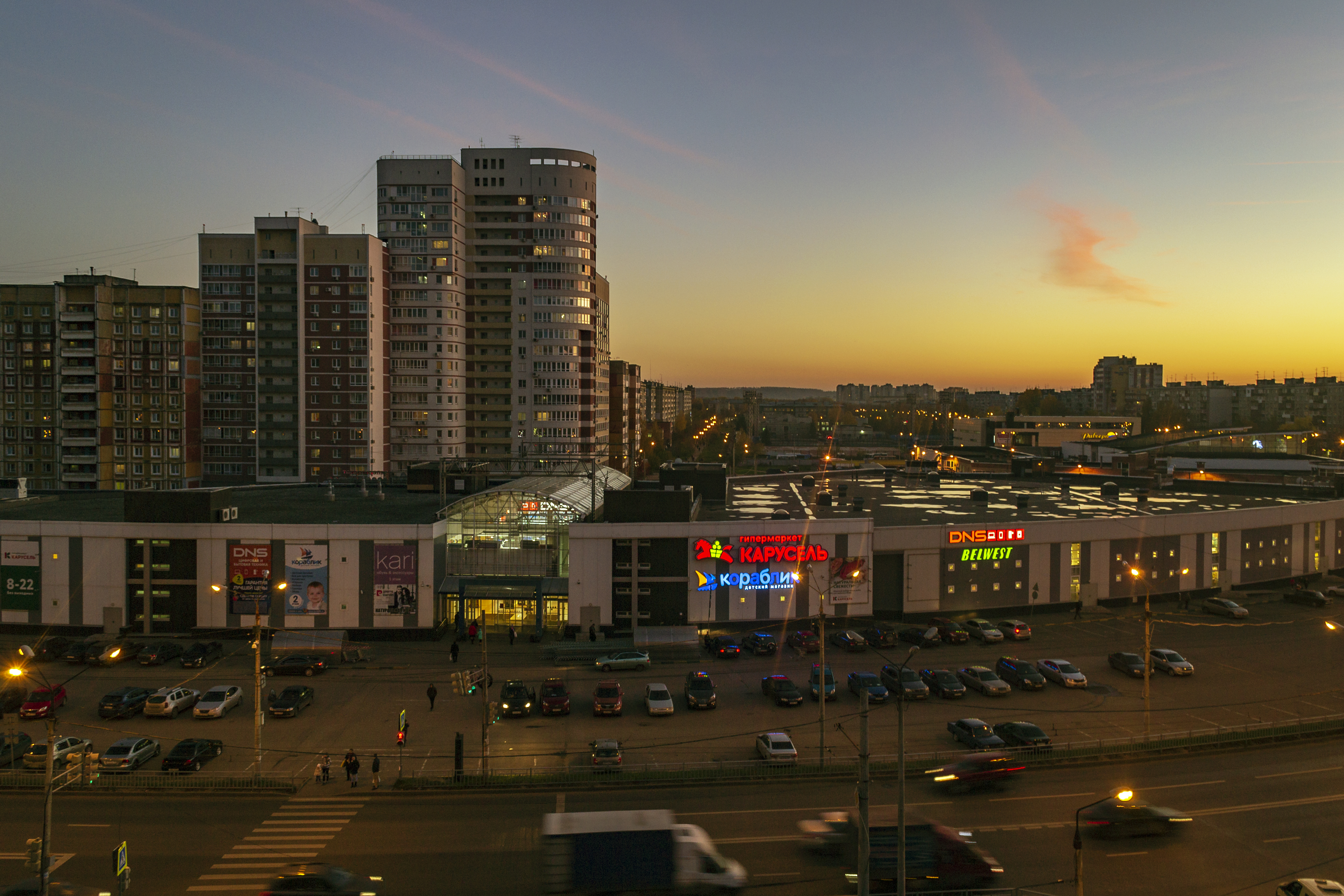
- Sotsgorod-II microdistrict

- Coat of arms
- Location of Avtozavodsky District on the map of Nizhny Novgorod
- Coordinates: 56°14′01″N 43°49′19″E
- Country: Russia
- Federal subject: Nizhny Novgorod Oblast
- Established: 1932
- Administrative center: Nizhny Novgorod

Government
  - Type: Local government
  - Head: Ivan Sogin

Area
  - Total: 94 km^{2} (36 sq mi)

Administrative structure
  - Inhabited localities: Sotsgorod, Strigino urban-type settlements

Avtozavodsky City District (Russian: Автозаво́дский райо́н, lit. 'District of the Automobile Plant') or Avtozavod (Russian: Автозавод, lit. 'Autoplant') is one of the eight districts of the city of Nizhny Novgorod, Russia. It is located in the southwest of the Lower City of Nizhny Novgorod, on the low left bank of the Oka River and has a land border with Leninsky City District to the north. It is also connected by the Myza Bridge with Prioksky City District in the Upper City (the right bank of the Oka). Population: 303,054 (2010 census); 314,494 (2002 census); 340,378 (1989 Soviet census).

The district's land area is 94 square kilometers (36 sq mi).

== History ==
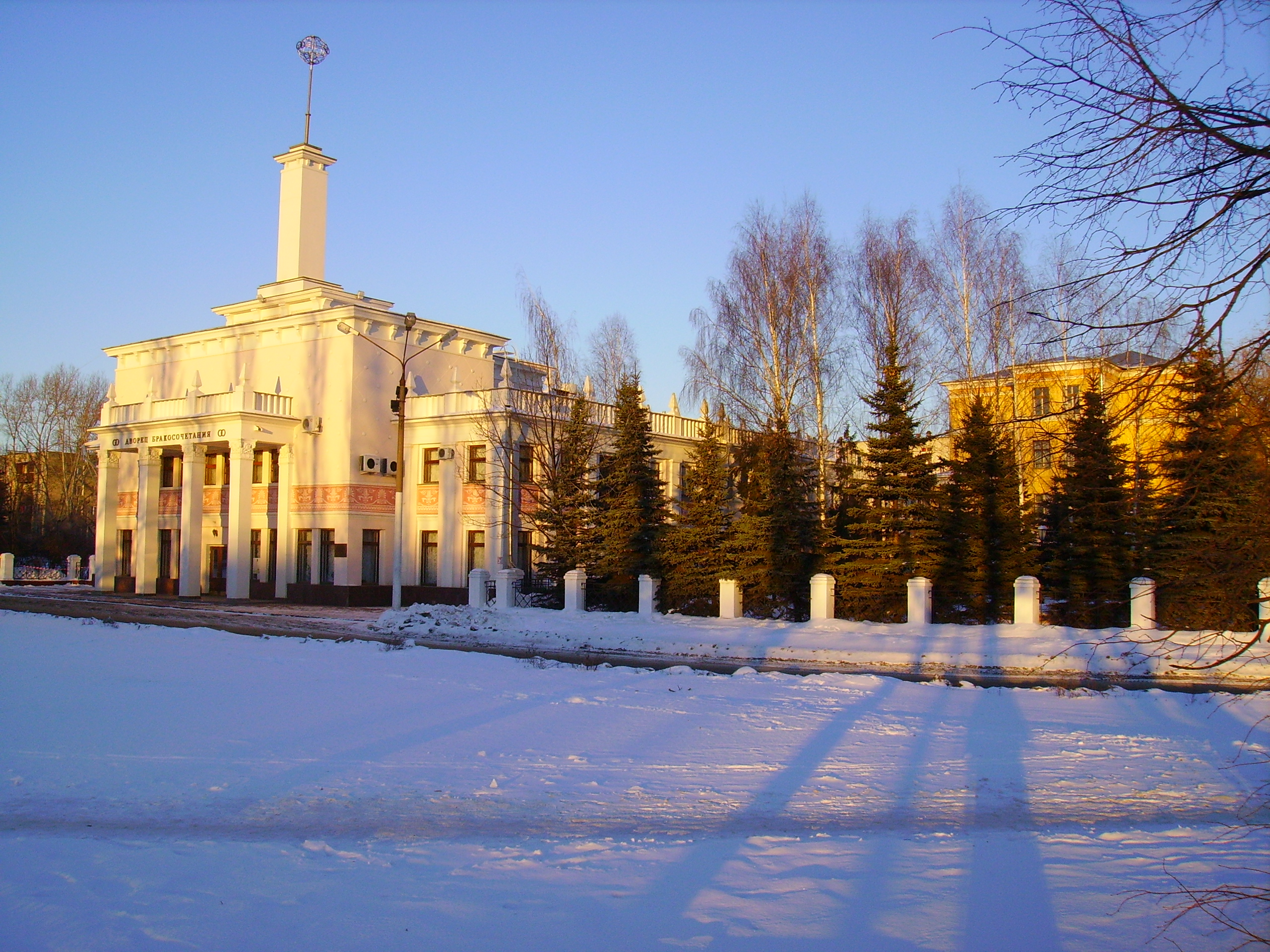
Avtozavodsky District Wedding Celebration Hall

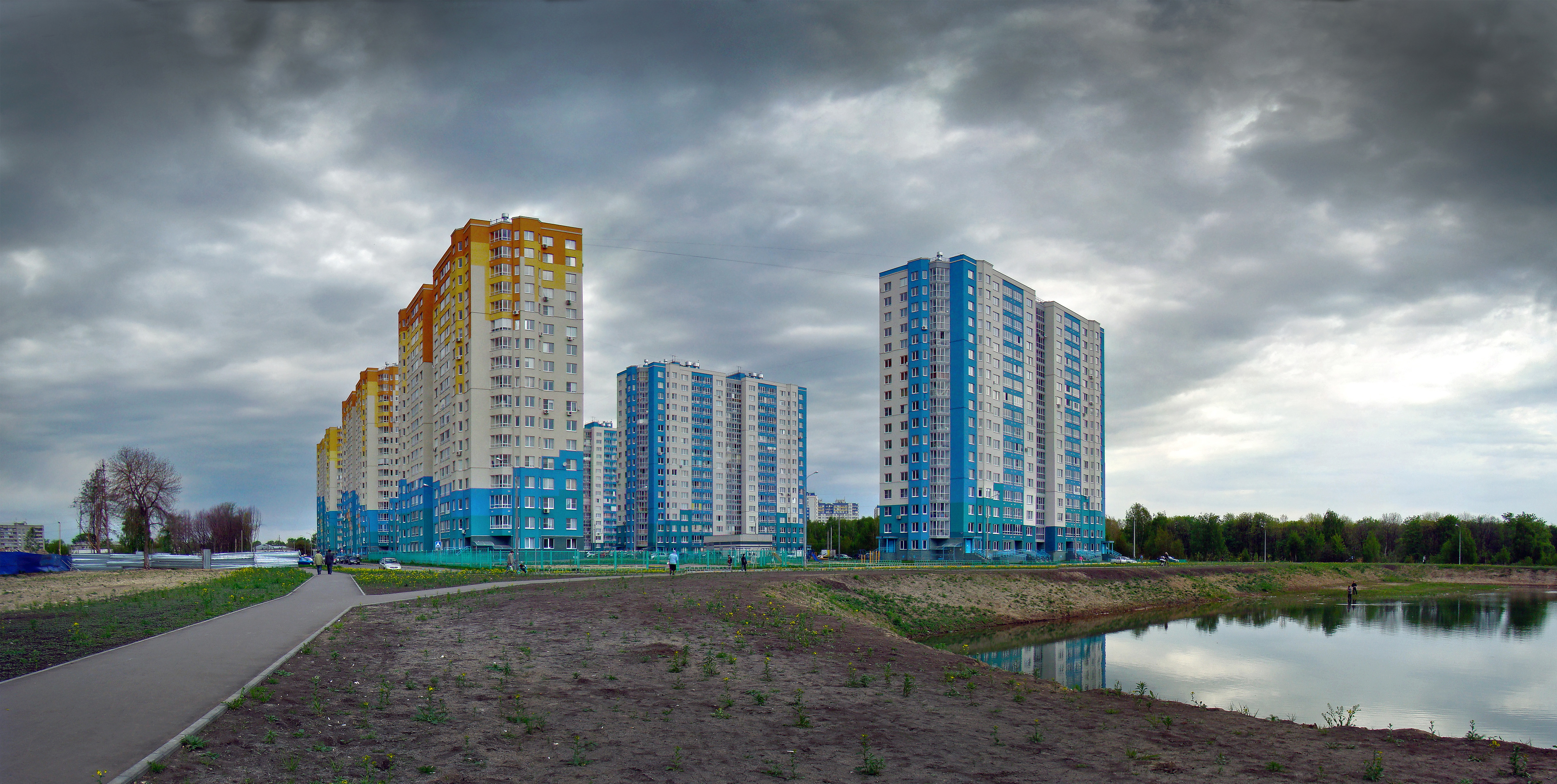
New apartment blocks in Avtozavodsky district

The name of the district literally means "automotive plant district", as it grew around the production facilities of the Gorky Automobile Plant, which were constructed in this area in 1930–1932. The administrative district was created in 1931 from the land that formerly had been part of Kanavinsky City District and the suburban Dzerzhinsky District. At the time, the district's population was around 30,000.

== Transportation ==
The Strigino International Airport, four stations of the Metro and two stations of the City Rail is located within Avtozavodsky City District.

== Economy ==
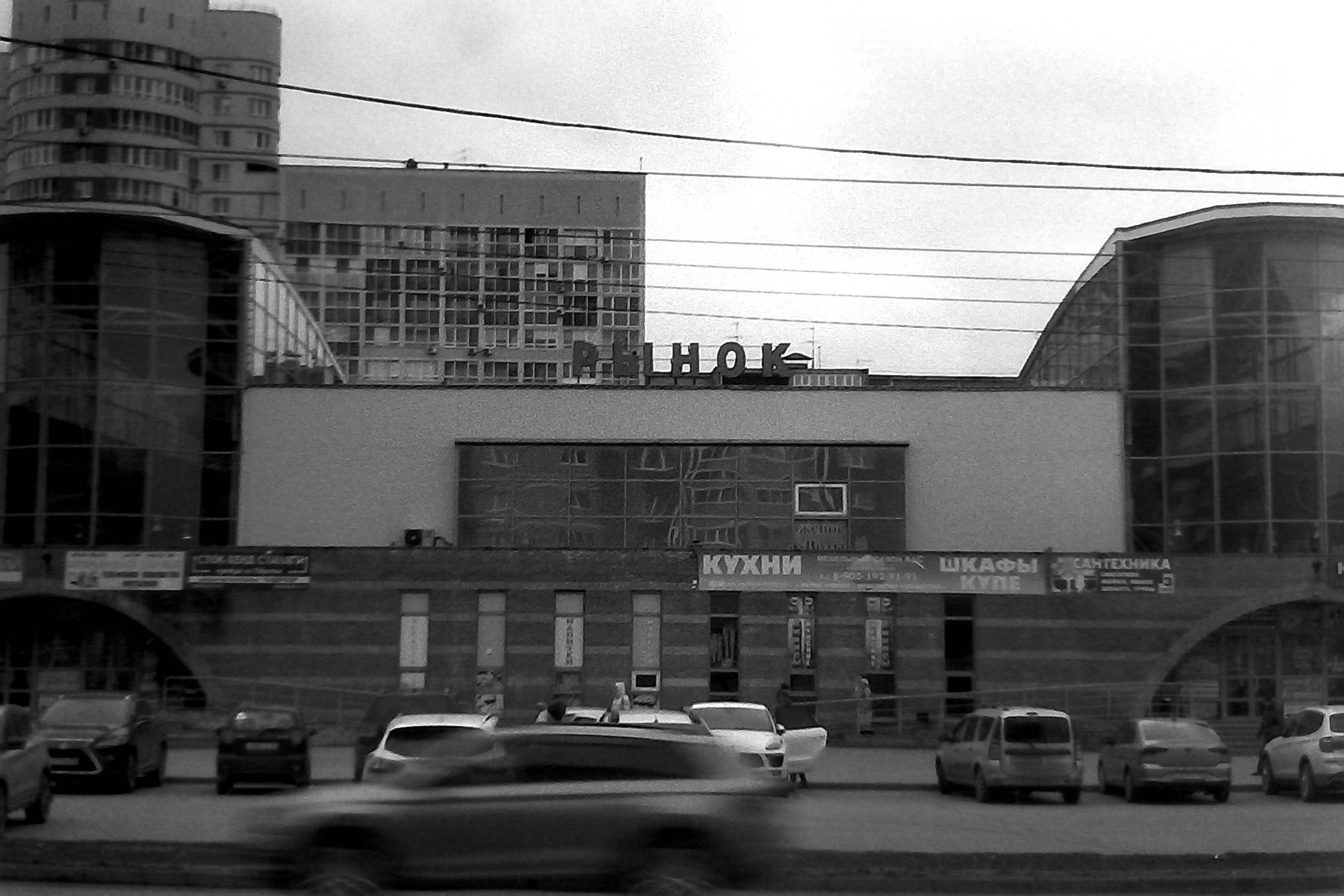
Avtozavodsky Market

Avtozavodsky Market is the central location for daily shopping as well as multiple other shopping malls across the whole district.

== Notable people ==
Natalia Vodianova
