= Sovetsky City District, Nizhny Novgorod =

Sovetsky District Советский район (Russian)
- District
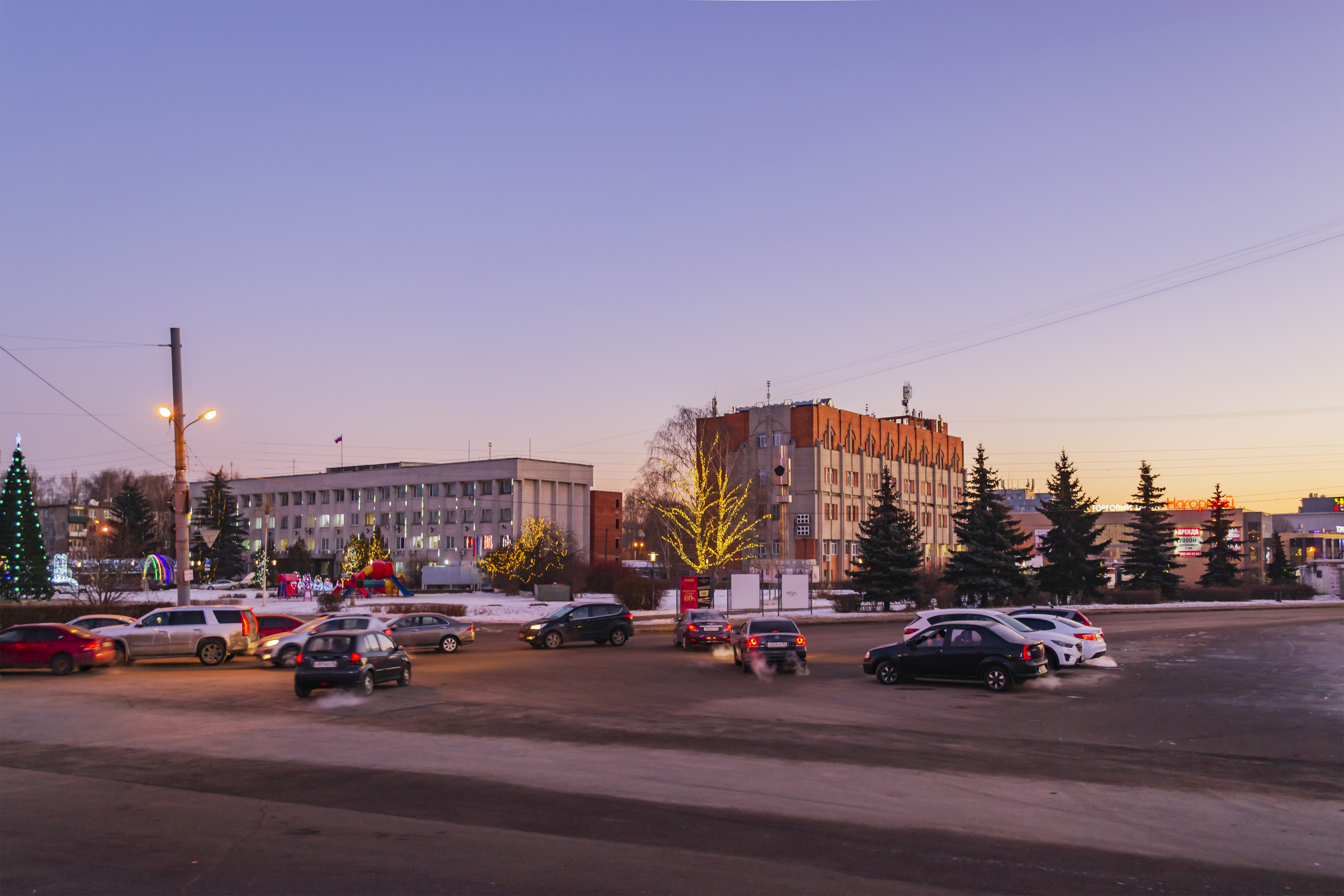
- Soviet Square is in the center of Sovetsky District

- Coat of arms
- Location of Sovetsky District on the map of Nizhny Novgorod
- Coordinates: 56°17′47″N 44°02′06″E
- Country: Russia
- Federal subject: Nizhny Novgorod Oblast
- Established: December 9, 1970
- Administrative center: Nizhny Novgorod

Area
  - Total: 31 km^{2} (12 sq mi)

Population (2010 Census)
  - Total: 143,401
  - Estimate (2020): 148 707
  - Density: 4,600/km^{2} (12,000/sq mi)
- Holiday: December 9, 1970
- Website: https://admgor.nnov.ru/rayon/8

Sovetsky City District (Russian: Сове́тский райо́н) is one of the eight districts of the city of Nizhny Novgorod, Russia. Population: 143,401 (2010 census); 154,205 (2002 census); 175,600 (1989 Soviet census). Area: 31 square kilometers (12 sq mi).

The district administration is located on Sovetskaya Square.
