= Moskovsky City District, Nizhny Novgorod =

Moskovsky District Московский район (Russian)
- District
- Coat of arms
- Location of Moskovsky District on the map of Nizhny Novgorod
- Coordinates: 56°20′6.558″N 43°50′10.536″E
- Country: Russia
- Federal subject: Nizhny Novgorod Oblast
- Established: 9 December 1970
- Administrative center: Nizhny Novgorod

Government
  - Type: Local government
  - Head: Vladimir Kropotin

Area
  - Total: 27 km^{2} (10 sq mi)

Moskovsky City District (Russian: Московский район), is one of the eight districts of the city of Nizhny Novgorod, Russia. Moskovsky District had existed since 1970. Between 1956 and 1970, the territory of today's Moskovsky District was part of the Sormovsky City District, meaning that during that time the Sormovo Airfield was actually within the Sormovsky District.
