= Leninsky City District, Nizhny Novgorod =

Leninsky City District Ленинский район (Russian)
- District
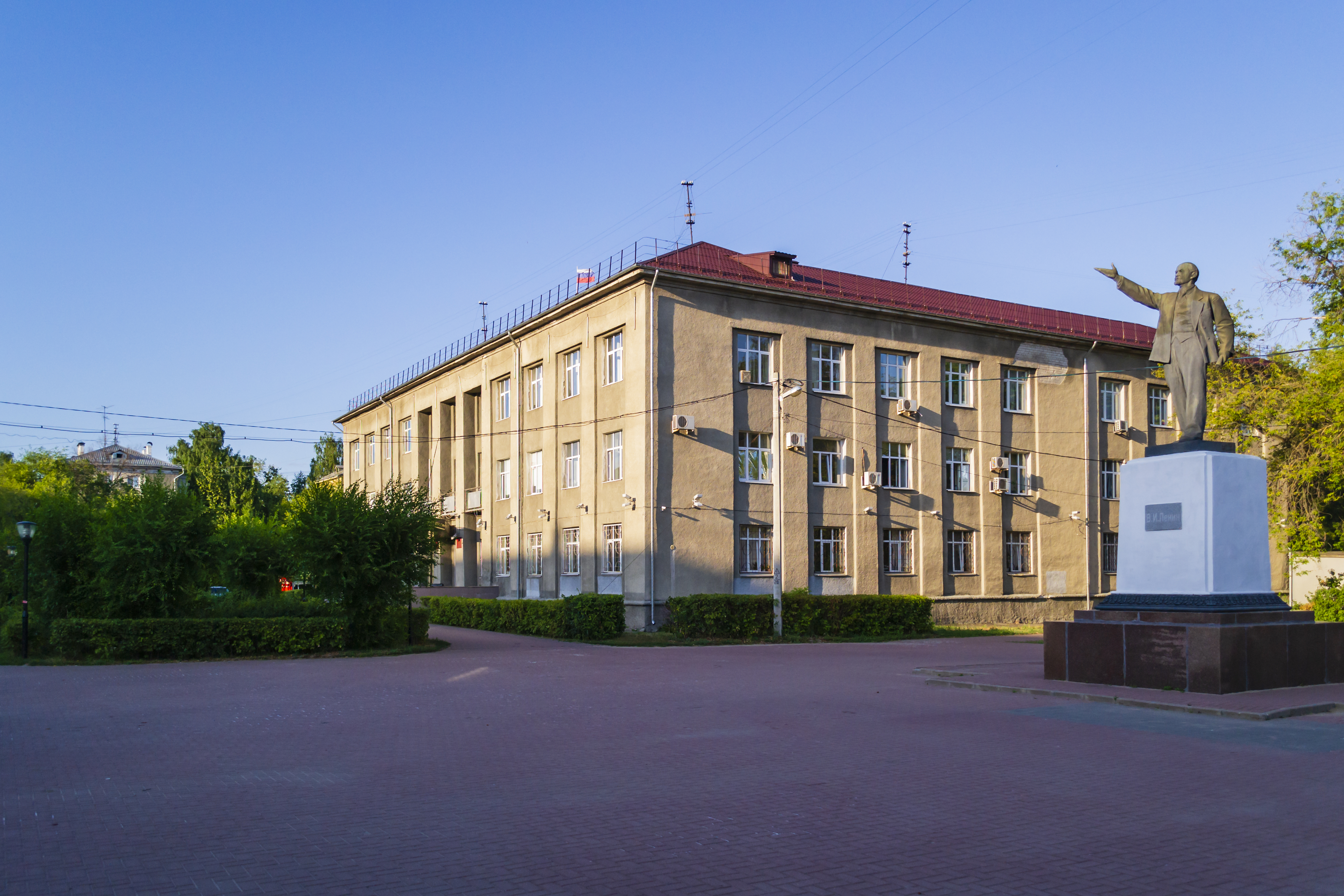
- Leninsky city district administration

- Coat of arms
- Coordinates: 56°17′04″N 43°56′37″E
- Country: Russia
- Federal subject: Nizhny Novgorod Oblast
- Established: 21 February 1935
- Administrative center: Nizhny Novgorod

Government
  - Type: Local government
  - Leader: Aleksei Glazov

Area
  - Total: 2,702 km^{2} (1,043 sq mi)

Leninsky City District (Russian: Ленинский район) is a district (raion) of the city of Nizhny Novgorod, Nizhny Novgorod Oblast, Russia. Population: 142,368 (2010 census); 145,379 (2002 census); 176,991 (1989 Soviet census).

== Neighborhoods and settlements of the Leninsky district ==
Neighborhood Gvozdilny,

Neighborhood Dvigatel Revolyutsii,

Neighborhood Hippodrome,

Neighborhood Karpovsky,

Neighborhood Krasnaya Etna,

Neighborhood Molitovsky Zaton,

Neighborhood Molitovsky,

Neighborhood Stankozavod,

Instrumentalny village,

Metalist village.

== District history ==
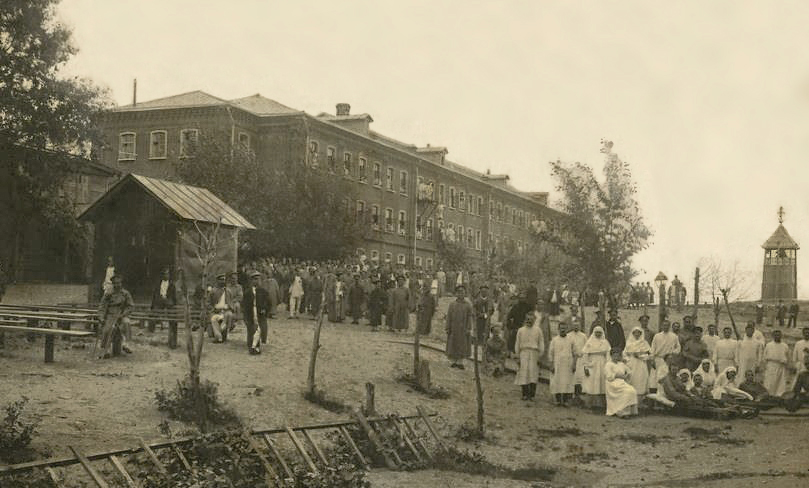
Hospital building in Molitovka. Now it is an Orthodox gymnasium named after St. Cyril and Methodius

Leninsky district was formed on February 21, 1935. By a decree of the Gorky Regional Committee of the All-Union Communist Party of Bolsheviks and the Regional Executive Committee, the Kanavinsky District was divided into two - Stalinsky (from the fair to the May 1 Park) and Leninsky (from the May 1 Park to the Avtozavodsky District). The newly formed Leninsky district included the following territories: on the northern side - the odd side of the October Revolution Street (from the railway, including the May 1 park, to the village of Kavkaz); in the east - along the banks of the Oka from the village of Kavkaz to the village of Karpovka; in the south - from the territory of the "Engine of the Revolution" plant through the forest to the railway, including the village named after Voroshilov; in the west - by rail, the area included the villages of Gvozdilny, Instrumental, Kavkaz, Kostina, Metallist, Pervomayka, Molitovka and Shuvalovo.

The historical core of the district is the village of Molitovka, where at the end of the 19th century a linen factory, the Molitovskaya Manufactory, was founded (nowadays, its buildings house the Bugrov Business Park business center).

The first written evidence of the Russian settlements of the future Leninsky district - Molitovka, Karpovka, Borzovka, Savelkovka dates back to the 16th-17th centuries. Probably these settlements arose in the 14th century, since in the documents of the 16th-17th centuries they are mentioned as having existed for a long time.

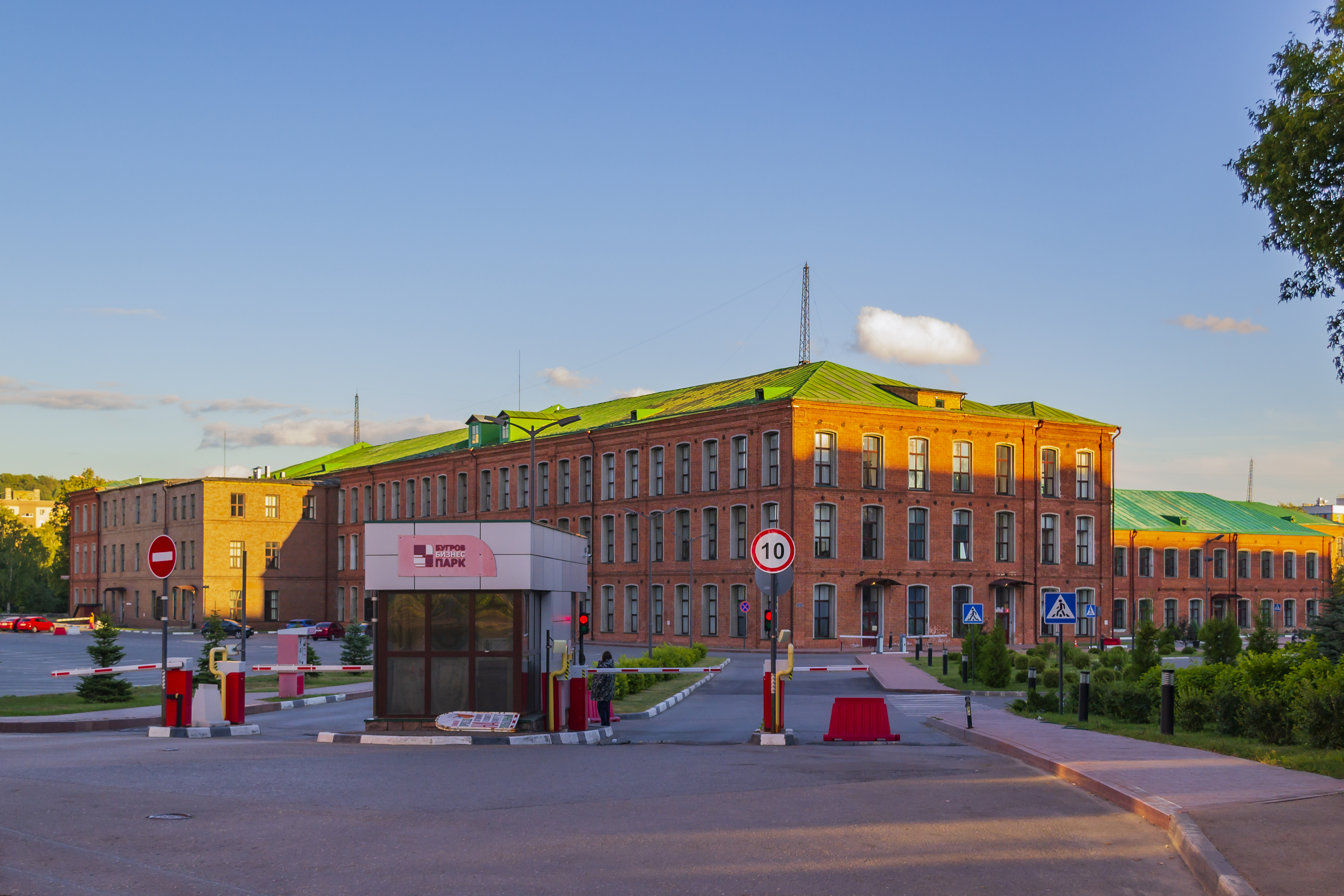
Bugrov Business Center

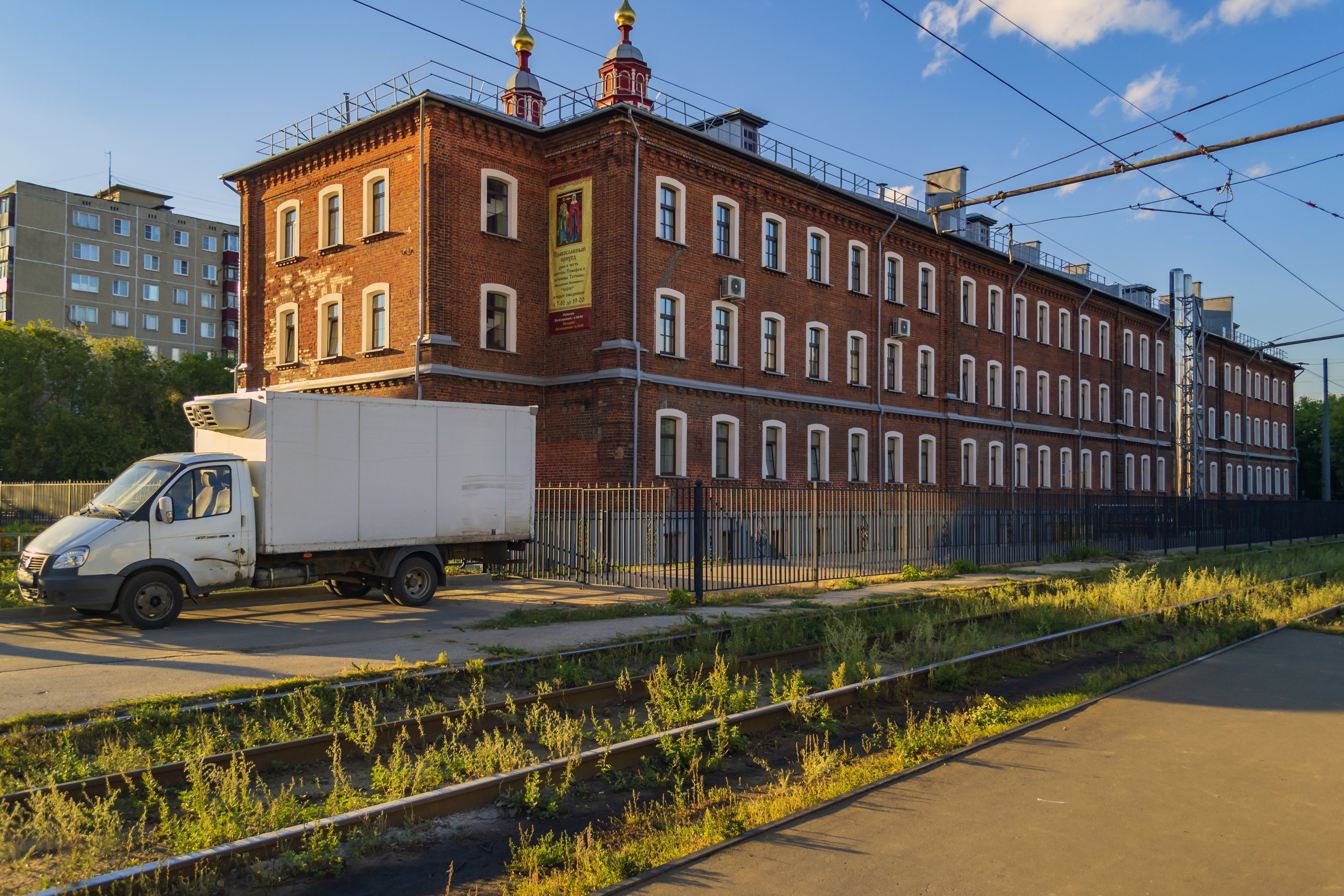
Christian gymnasium in the name of Saints Cyril and Methodius

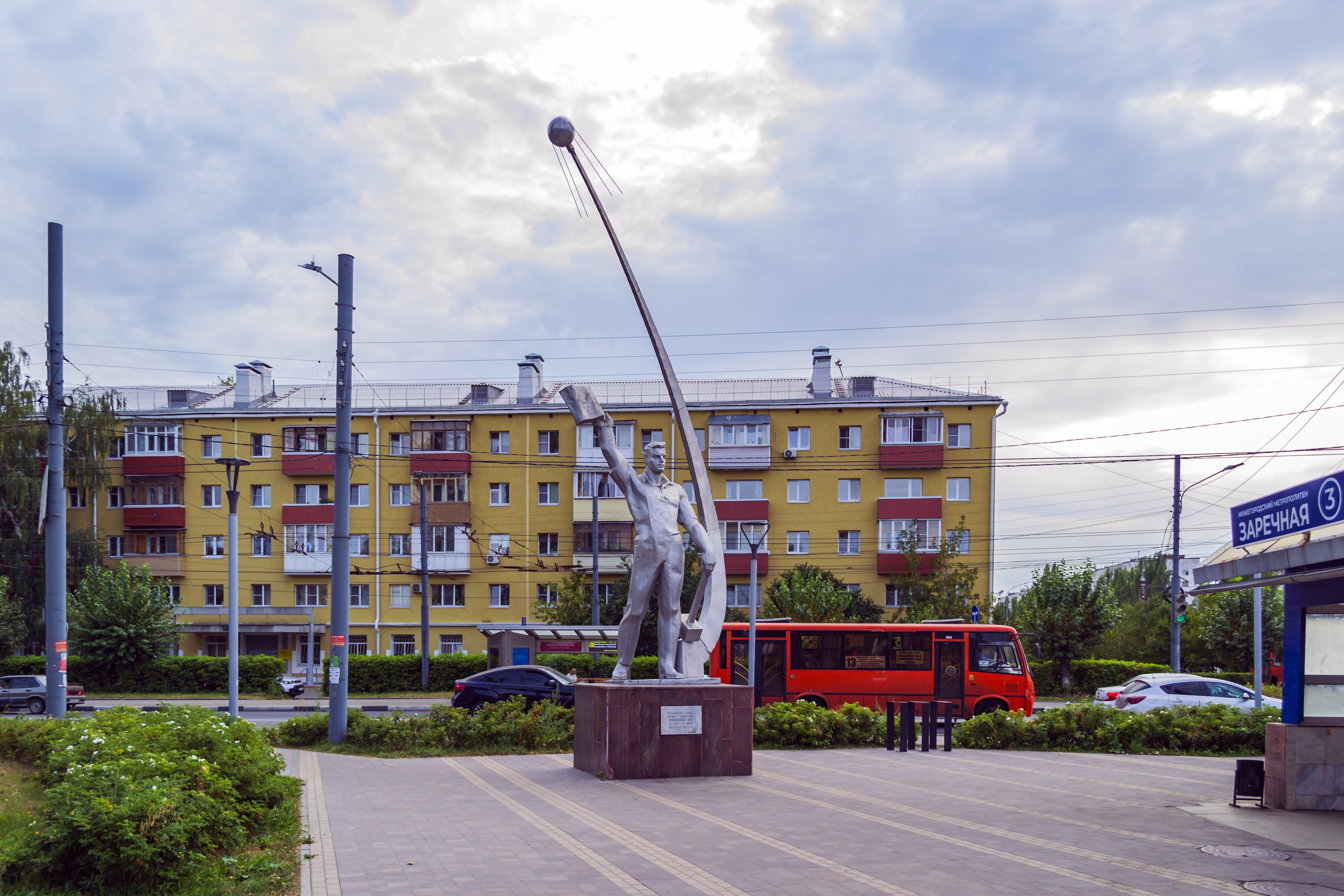
Cosmonaut Komarov Street

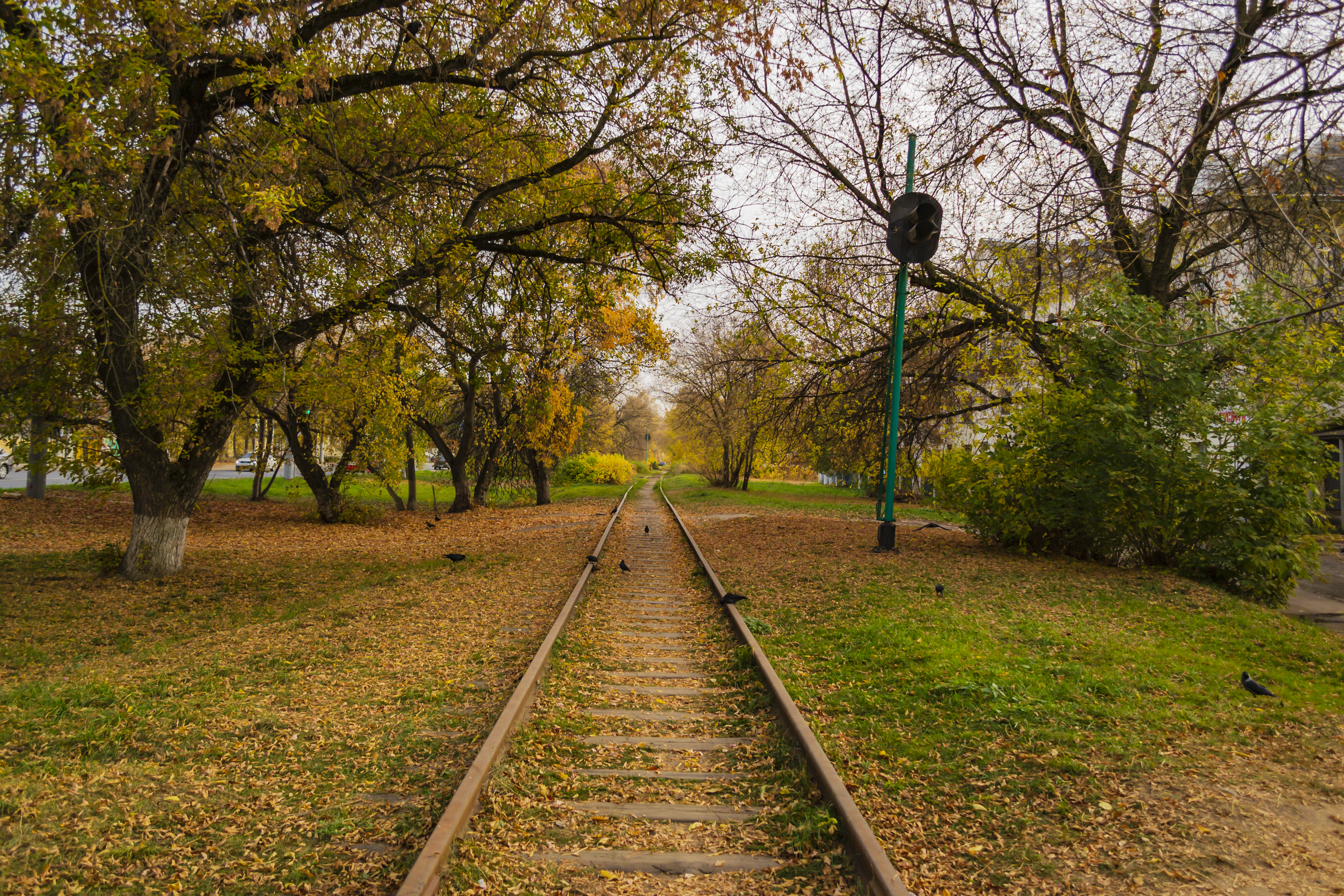
Rail road in Cosmonaut Komarov Street

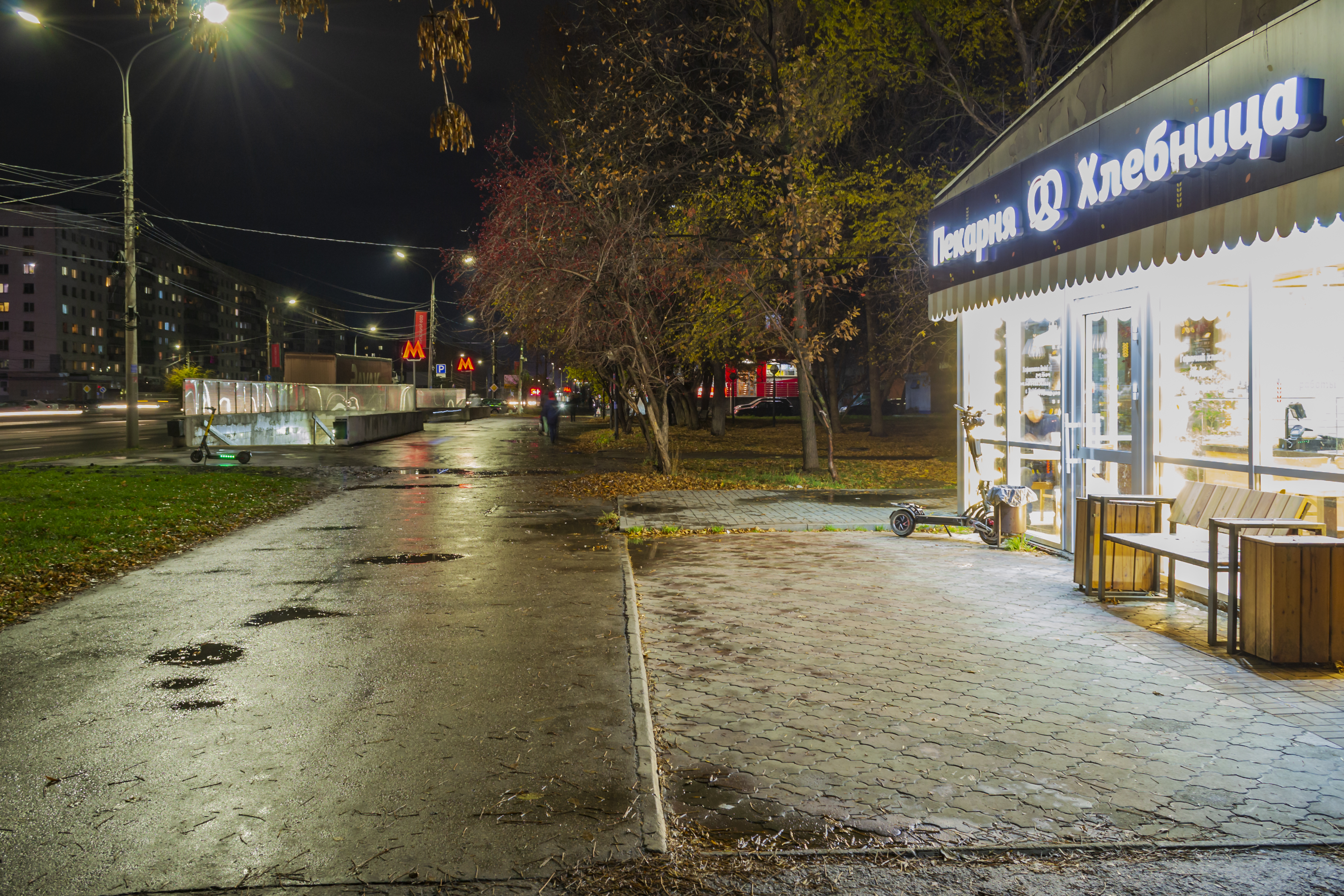
Lenin avenue. Dvigatel Revolyutsii metro station
