= Nizhegorodsky City District, Nizhny Novgorod =

Nizhegorodsky District Нижегородский район (Russian)
- District
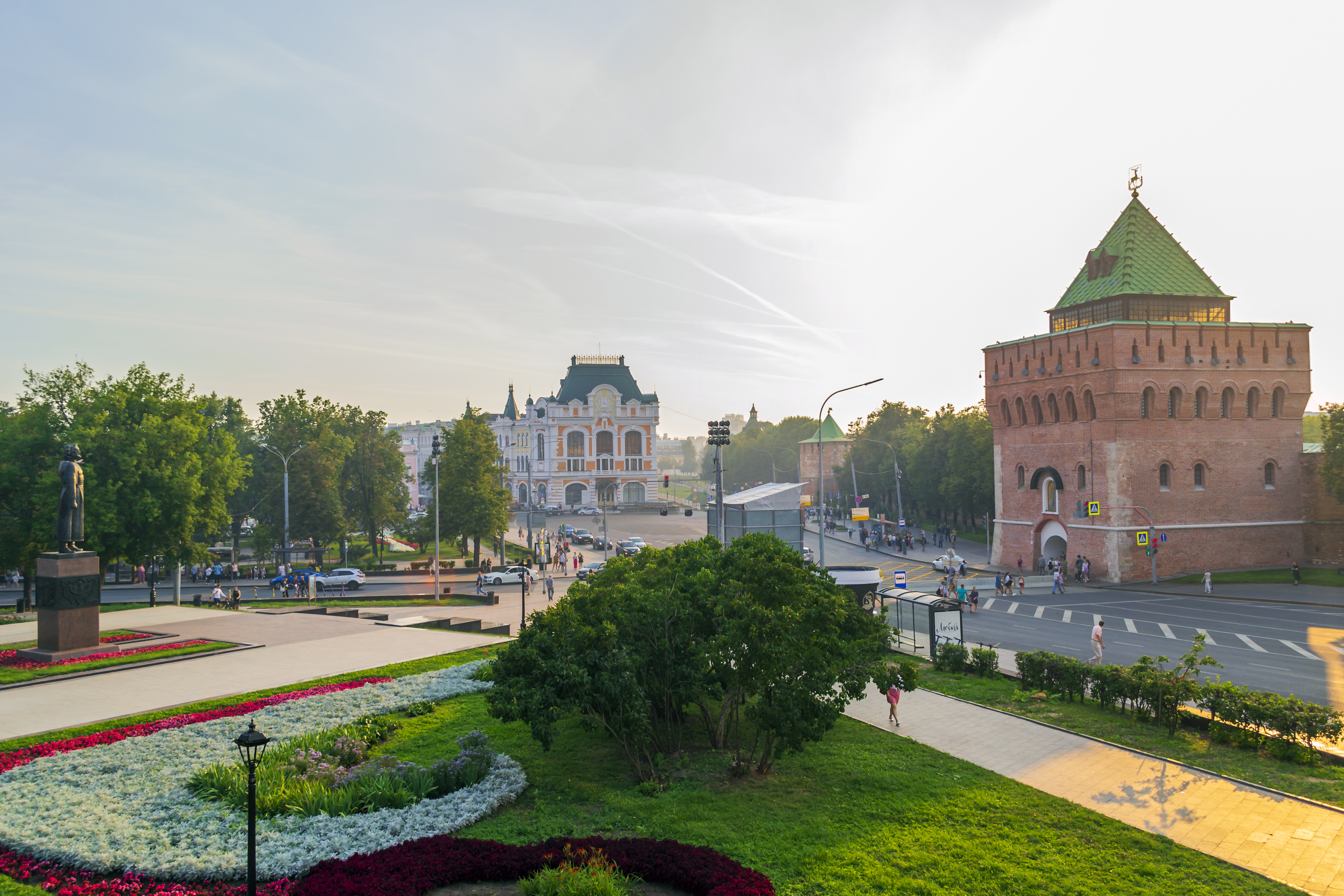
- Minin and Pozharsky Square

- Coat of arms
- Location of Nizhegorodsky District on the map of Nizhny Novgorod
- Coordinates: 56°19′41″N 44°00′27″E
- Country: Russia
- Federal subject: Nizhny Novgorod Oblast
- Established: 1970
- Administrative center: Nizhny Novgorod

Area
  - Total: 67 km^{2} (26 sq mi)

Administrative structure
  - Inhabited localities: Kremlin, Zelyony Gorod urban-type settlements

Nizhegorodsky City District (Russian: Нижегородский район) is a central administrative district (raion) in the Upper City of Nizhny Novgorod, Russia. It is the main strategic, historical, political and cultural district of the city.

The centre of district is popular among tourists. It contains the Nizhny Novgorod Kremlin, the Minin and Pozharsky Square, Bolshaya Pokrovskaya Street, Rozhdestvenskaya Street, the monument to Minin and Pozharsky and other landmarks.
