= Kanavinsky City District =

Kanavinsky City District Канавинский район (Russian)
- District
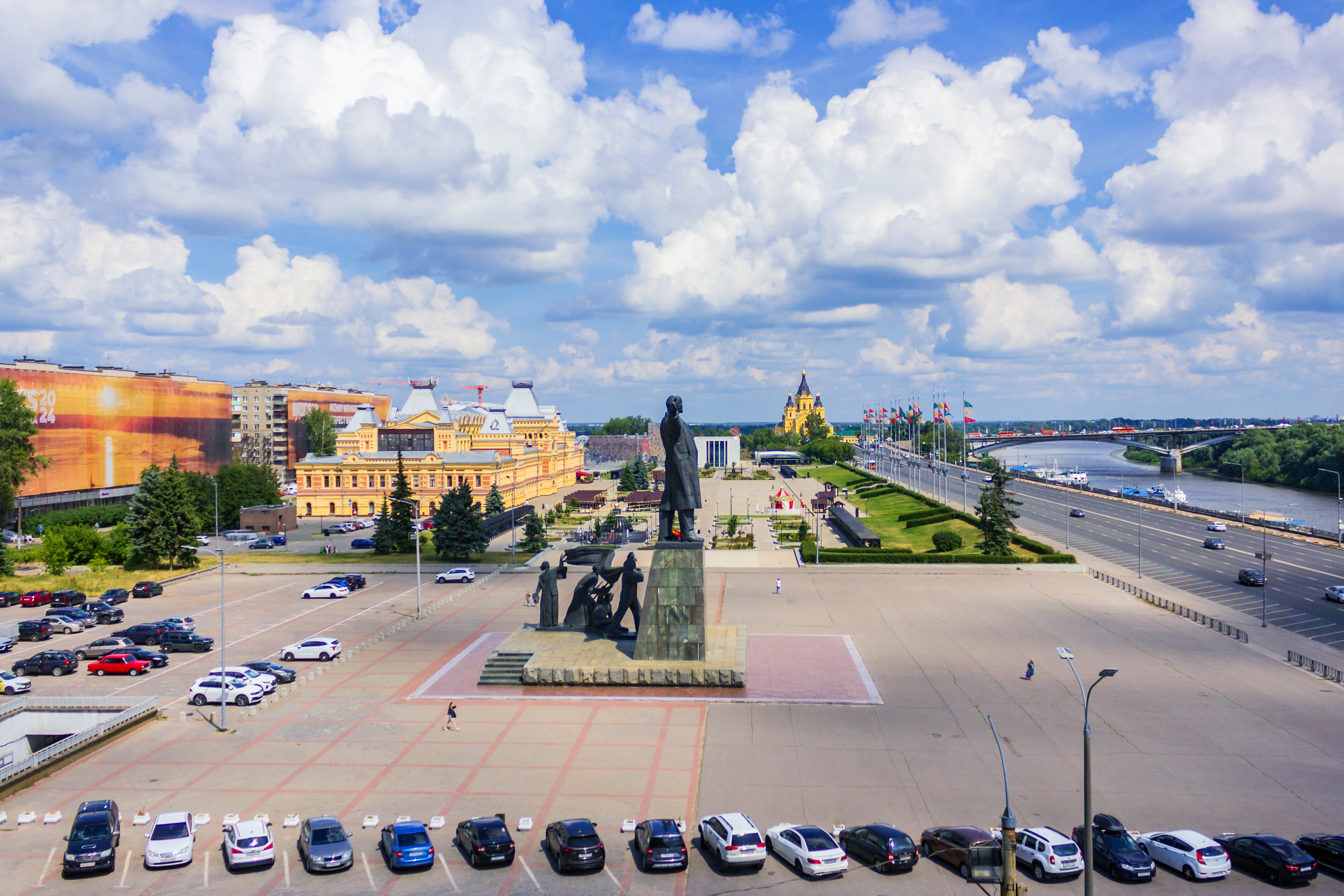
- The Fair

- Coat of arms
- Location of Kanavinsky City District on the map of Nizhny Novgorod
- Coordinates: 56°18′57″N 43°51′59″E
- Country: Russia
- Federal subject: Nizhny Novgorod Oblast
- Established: 1928
- Administrative center: Nizhny Novgorod

Area
  - Total: 48.21 km^{2} (18.61 sq mi)

Kanavinsky City District (Russian: Канавинский район), or simple Kanavino, is a district (raion) of the city of Nizhny Novgorod, Nizhny Novgorod Oblast, Russia. Population: 155,113 (2010 census); 160,894 (2002 census);

== District history ==
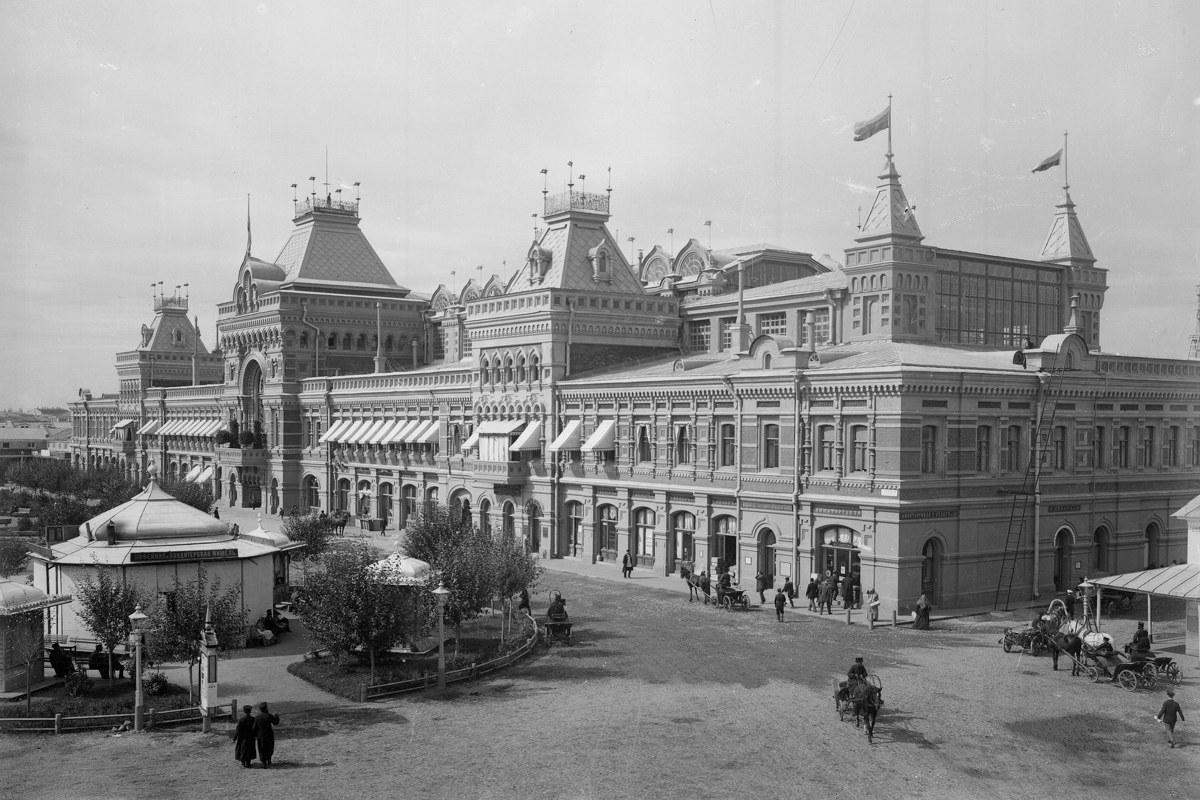
All-Russia Exhibition 1896

Kanavinsky district is one of the oldest districts of Nizhny Novgorod. The first mention of it as the Kunavinskaya Sloboda dates back to 1599. The exact etymology of the name is unknown, but some philologists believe that it comes from the name of the kuna currency. Another version of the origin is the patronymic: from the Erzya female pagan name Kunava, denoting the wife of a noble person, the queen, who probably owned these lands. There is also a version based on the legend, which, however, is rejected by philologists as untenable: supposedly on the left bank of the Oka there was a tavern belonging to a certain godfather, and lovers of revelry and drunkenness from the river, approaching the tavern, shouted “Kuma, wine!” It was this legend that formed the basis of the famous opera by P. I. Tchaikovsky "The Enchantress". The transition from the pronunciation of "Kunavino" to "Kanavino" occurred in the first half of the 20th century.

On July 15, 1822, the famous Nizhny Novgorod fair was opened in Kunavino. More precisely, it was moved here from the village of Makaryevo. It became the main trading and exchange center of Russia. In 1896, the All-Russia Exhibition was held at the fair and a tram was launched.

Until 1928, Kanavino was an independent administrative unit (since 1919 - a city), and since 1928 it became part of Nizhny Novgorod.

In 1929, the first enterprise of the Ford factories in Russia, Automobile Assembly Plant No. 1, was organized here, and the first Soviet truck Ford, on the basis of which the famous lorry was subsequently built, left the factory gates on February 1, 1930.
