= Sormovsky City District =

Sormovsky District Сормовский район (Russian)
- District
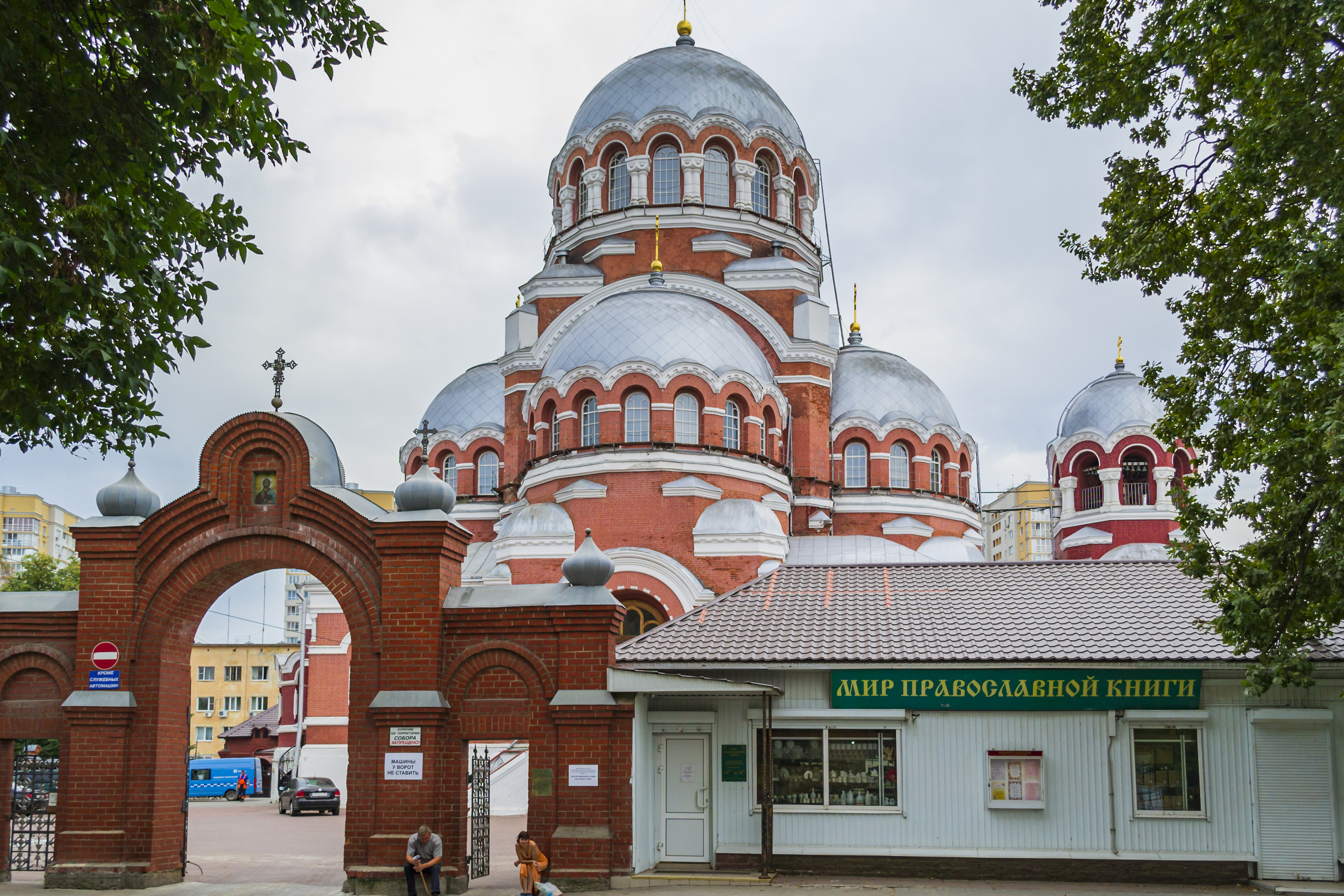
- Church of the Transfiguration

- Coat of arms
- Location of Sormovsky District on the map of Nizhny Novgorod
- Coordinates: 56°21′N 43°52′E
- Country: Russia
- Federal subject: Nizhny Novgorod Oblast
- Established: 1924
- Administrative center: Nizhny Novgorod

Government
  - Type: Local government
  - Head: Dmitry Sivokhin

Area
  - Total: 100 km^{2} (39 sq mi)

Administrative structure
  - Inhabited localities: Sormovo Centre urban-type settlements

Sormovsky City District (Russian: Со́рмовский райо́н), or Sormovo (Russian: Со́рмово), is one of the eight districts of the city of Nizhny Novgorod, Russia. It occupies the northwestern corner of the city, adjacent to the Volga River. Population: 168,761 (2010 census); 177,940 (2002 census); 185,994 (1989 Soviet census).

== History ==
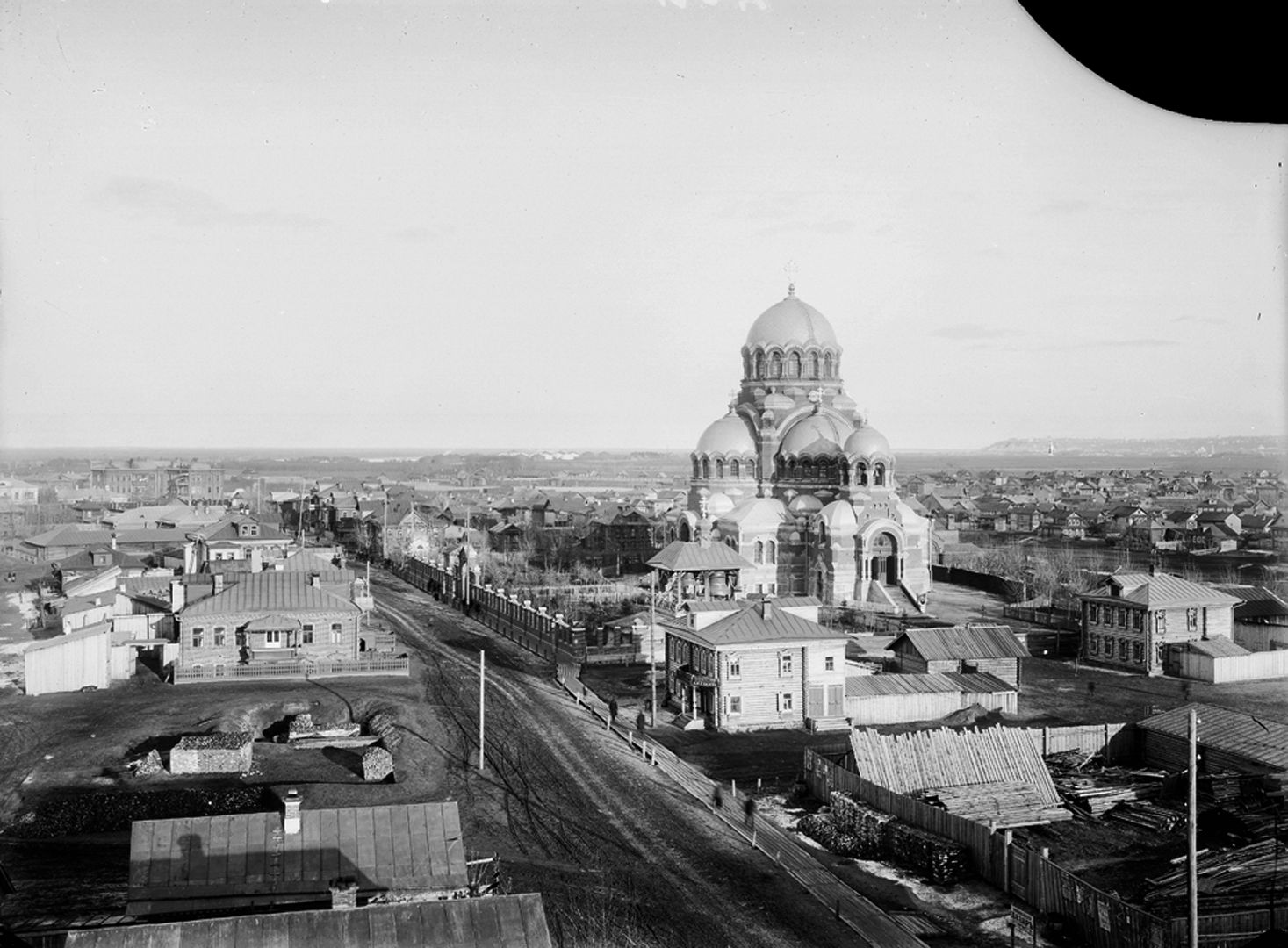
Sormovo. Sobornaya Street

The village originally known as Soromovo (Соромово) had existed since 1542. In 1849, the Sormovo Works—soon one of Russia's most important machine-building plants, later known as Krasnoye Sormovo—was founded; its owner had the village renamed to more euphonic Sormovo. Although legally a village, it soon grew into a large workers' settlement; in 1922, Sormovo became a city; in 1929, it was amalgamated into the city of Nizhny Novgorod, becoming one of its districts.

It is one of the city's industrial districts. Besides Krasnoye Sormovo, its well-known enterprises include the Volga Shipyard (which was spun off from Krasnoye Sormovo in 1970, and is geographically adjacent to its parent plant) and the Sormovo Confectionery Factory (Сормовская кондитерская фабрика).

The May Day demonstration, mentioned in The Mother by Maxim Gorky, took place in Sormovo, 1902.

== Recreation and sports ==
The district does not have good, conveniently accessible beaches on the Volga shoreline, due to much of it being used by shipyards and floodlands. Instead, the locals prefer to use sand beaches on several artificial lakes, which formed several decades ago in the pits left from defunct sand quarries.

=== Association football ===
- DYuTs Sormovo (2002)

== Sormovo airfield ==
Sokol Aircraft Plant and its airfield are located just south of the border of Sormovsky City District, within the neighboring Moskovsky City District of Nizhny Novgorod. Between 1956 and 1970, the territory of today's Moskovsky District was part of the Sormovsky District, meaning that during that time the Sormovo Airfield was actually within the Sormovsky District.

== Transport ==
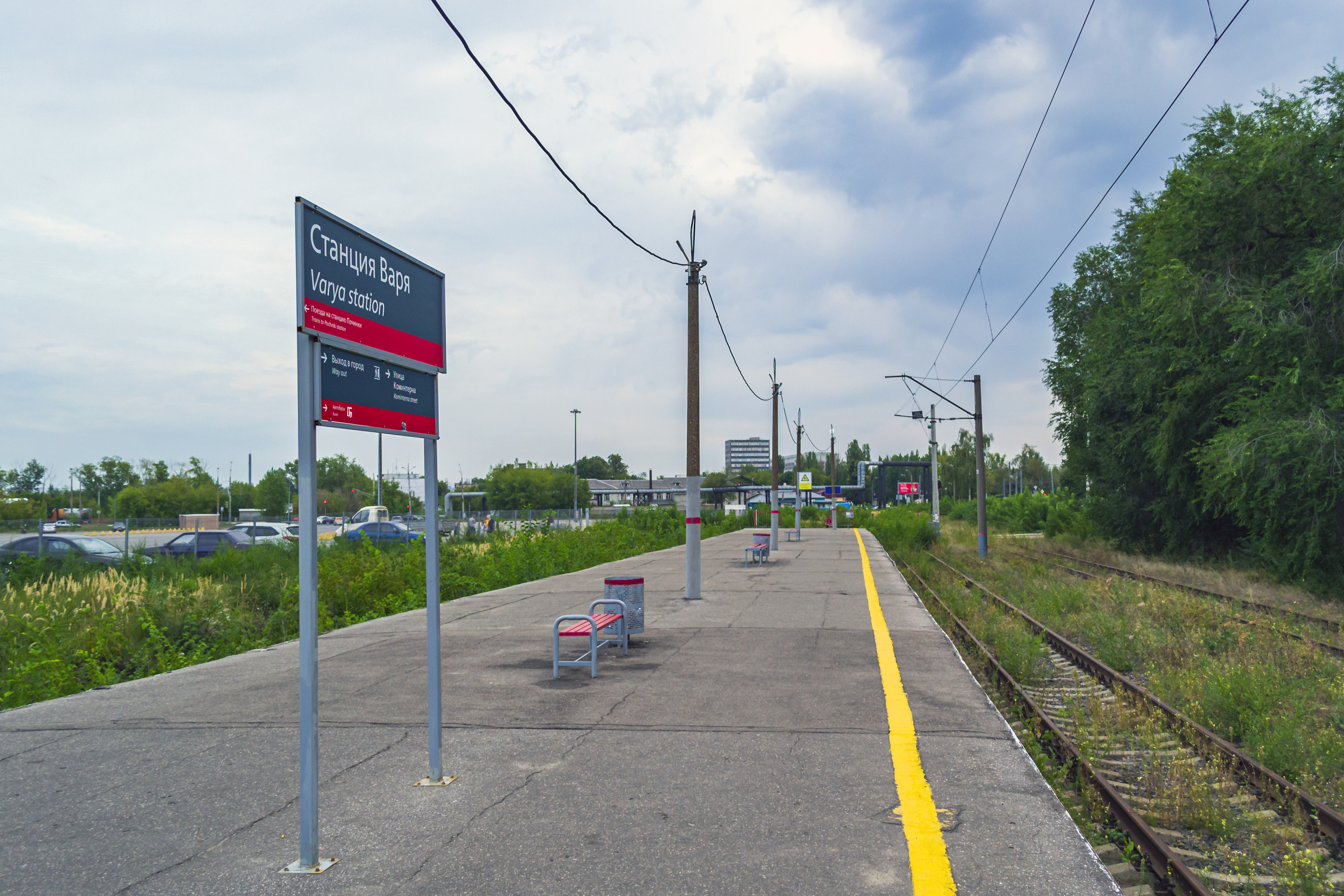
Varya station of the City Rail

- City Rail. Included in the structure of the Gorky railway. It is an auxiliary line for the metro. It has a transfer station from the Moskovsky railway station to the Moskovskaya metro station. In the same place it connects with the second line of the electric train in the direction of the Prospekt Gagarina station.
- Suburban trains. There is a permanent connection with the cities of Balakhna and Zavolzhye. There are two railway lines that merge into one in front of the Pochinki station. Electric trains depart from Moskovsky railway station and Varya station. On the territory of the Sormovsky district there are Kooperativnaya stations (on the Nizhny Novgorod-Moskovsky - Kostarikha - Zavolzhye branch); Varya, Sormovo (on the branch of Varya - Zavolzhye), Pochinki, Koposovo, Narodnaya, Vysokovo, Dubravnaya.
- Bus transport. On the territory of the Sormovsky district there is the Nizhny Novgorod passenger transport enterprise No. 1 (KIM street, 335). Buses (LiAZ and MAZ) and private fixed-route taxis (PAZ) are the main modes of transport in the area. City bus transport connects the Sormovsky district with all districts of Nizhny Novgorod, as well as with the working settlement of Bolshoye Kozino, Balakhninsky district, Nizhny Novgorod region (bus route No. 318). In addition, suburban and intercity bus routes pass through the Sormovsky district from the Kanavinskaya bus station in the direction of Balakhna, Zavolzhye, Gorodets, Chkalovsk, Sokolsky, Kovernin, Palekh, Puchezh, Yuryevets, Kineshma, Ivanovo, Kostroma.
- Tram. 2 tram routes No. 6 and No. 7 connect the Sormovsky and Moskovsky districts with the Moskovsky railway station. From the tram stop Station Varya trams of these routes move along the ring towards each other.
