= Dzerzhinsk constituency =

Russian legislative constituency

Dzerzhinsk single-member constituency
- Constituency of the Russian State Duma
- Deputy: None
- Federal subject: Nizhny Novgorod Oblast
- Districts: Ardatovsky, Bogorodsky, Dalnekonstantinovsky, Dzerzhinsk, Navashino, Pavlovsky, Sosnovsky
- Voters: 457,477 (2003)

The Dzerzhinsk constituency (No.119) was a Russian legislative constituency in Nizhny Novgorod Oblast in 1993–2007. It covered western Nizhny Novgorod Oblast, including industrial towns of Dzerzhinsk and Pavlovo. The seat was last occupied by United Russia faction member Vladimir Stalmakhov, a businessman and FSB veteran, who defeated incumbent first-term Communist State Duma member Vladimir Basov in the 2003 election.

The constituency was dissolved in 2007 when State Duma adopted full proportional representation for the next two electoral cycles. Dzerzhinsk constituency was not re-established for the 2016 election, as Nizhny Novgorod Oblast lost its sixth seat, and was partitioned between Avtozavodsky and Kanavinsky constituencies.

== Boundaries ==
1993–1995: Bogorodsk, Bogorodsky District, Dalnekonstantinovsky District, Dzerzhinsk, Navashinsky District, Pavlovo, Pavlovsky District, Sosnovsky District, Vachsky District
The constituency covered west-central part of Nizhny Novgorod Oblast, including western suburbs of Nizhny Novgorod and the industrial towns of Bogorodsk, Dzerzhinsk and Pavlovo.

1995–2007: Ardatovsky District, Bogorodsk, Bogorodsky District, Dalnekonstantinovsky District, Dzerzhinsk, Navashinsky District, Pavlovo, Pavlovsky District, Sosnovsky District, Vachsky District
The constituency barely changed after the 1995 redistricting, only gaining Ardatovsky District.

== Members elected ==
Election	Member	Party
1993	Mikhail Seslavinsky (Note: appointed Head of Federal Service for Television and Radio in May 1998)	Independent
1995	Mikhail Seslavinsky	Our Home – Russia
1998	Ardalyon Panteleyev	Independent
1999	Gennady Khodyrev (Note: elected Governor of Nizhny Novgorod Oblast in August 2001)	Independent
2002	Vladimir Basov	Independent
2003	Vladimir Stalmakhov	Independent

== Election results ==
=== 1993 ===
==== Declared candidates ====
- Aleksandr Fyodorov (Independent), Member of Nizhny Novgorod Oblast Council of People's Deputies (1990–present)
- Nikolay Katkov (YaBL), Member of Nizhny Novgorod Oblast Council of People's Deputies (1990–present)
- Sergey Maslagin (Independent), Pavlovo Tool Plant general director
- Mikhail Seslavinsky (Independent), former People's Deputy of Russia (1990–1993)
- Mikhail Stepanov (Independent), businessman
- Anatoly Tarasov (Independent), chemical executive
- Sergey Tsvetov (DPR), chairman of the party office in Pavlovo
- Vladimir Yershov (RDDR), Nizhny Novgorod State University associate professor

==== Results ====
Summary of the 12 December 1993 Russian legislative election in the Dzerzhinsk constituency
Candidate	Party	Votes	%
Mikhail Seslavinsky	Independent	76,914	32.91%
Aleksandr Fyodorov	Independent	27,916	11.95%
Sergey Maslagin	Independent	25,577	10.95%
Anatoly Tarasov	Independent	18,640	7.98%
Mikhail Stepanov	Independent	13,796	5.90%
Sergey Tsvetov	Democratic Party	10,689	4.57%
Vladimir Yershov	Russian Democratic Reform Movement	10,660	4.56%
Nikolay Katkov	Yavlinsky–Boldyrev–Lukin	6,874	2.94%
against all		33,945	14.53%
Total		233,685	100%

=== 1995 ===
==== Declared candidates ====
- Igor Artyomov (Independent), chairman of the board of Russian All-National Union (1990–present)
- Igor Dyukov (PPR–ST), union leader
- Luiza Gagut (LDPR), Member of State Duma (1994–present)
- Aleksey Guskov (Independent), chemical executive
- Vladimir Koterev (Independent), businessman
- Sergey Leskov (Independent), military unit commander
- Mikhail Nefedov (Independent), construction executive
- Aleksey Purusov (Forward, Russia!), entrepreneur
- Yelena Sannikova (Social Democrats), State Duma staffer
- Mikhail Seslavinsky (NDR), incumbent Member of State Duma (1994–present)
- Anatoly Tarasov (CPRF), chemical executive, 1993 candidate for this seat
- Sergey Tsvetov (KRO), aide to State Duma member, 1993 DPR candidate for this seat
- Boris Usov (Independent), Pavlovo Bus Factory deputy general director

==== Results ====
Summary of the 17 December 1995 Russian legislative election in the Dzerzhinsk constituency
Candidate	Party	Votes	%
Mikhail Seslavinsky (incumbent)	Our Home – Russia	53,205	17.72%
Anatoly Tarasov	Communist Party	42,734	14.23%
Sergey Leskov	Independent	37,823	12.60%
Igor Artyomov	Independent	35,328	11.77%
Boris Usov	Independent	31,745	10.57%
Igor Dyukov	Trade Unions and Industrialists – Union of Labour	17,046	5.68%
Luiza Gagut	Liberal Democratic Party	14,323	4.77%
Sergey Tsvetov	Congress of Russian Communities	11,110	3.70%
Yelena Sannikova	Social Democrats	7,070	2.35%
Aleksey Guskov	Independent	4,526	1.51%
Aleksey Purusov	Forward, Russia!	4,095	1.36%
Vladimir Koterev	Independent	2,474	0.82%
Mikhail Nefedov	Independent	2,047	0.68%
against all		28,237	9.40%
Total		300,257	100%

=== 1998 ===
Results by district: Ardalyon Panteleyev: 20–30% 30–40% 40–50% 50–60%; Sergey Lisovsky: 20–30%; Andrey Gerasimov: 20–30%

==== Declared candidates ====
- Tamara Aksenova (Independent), aide to State Duma member
- Gennady Blinov (Independent)
- Andrey Gerasimov (Independent), transportation businessman
- Valery Kravchenko (Independent), lawyer
- Sergey Lisovsky (Independent), television executive
- Roman Murashov (Independent), journalist
- Ardalyon Panteleyev (Independent), attorney
- Ilya Polyashov (Independent), Member of Dzerzhinsk City Duma (1996–present)
- Lidia Ugolnikova (Independent), chemical technical school history teacher

==== Results ====
Summary of the 29 September 1998 by-election in the Dzerzhinsk constituency
Candidate	Party	Votes	%
Ardalyon Panteleyev	Independent	39,151	27.90%
Sergey Lisovsky	Independent	29,340	20.91%
Andrey Gerasimov	Independent	21,820	15.55%
Lidia Ugolnikova	Independent	16,772	11.95%
Ilya Polyashov	Independent	7,454	5.31%
Tamara Aksenova	Independent	2,213	1.58%
Valery Kravchenko	Independent	969	0.69%
Gennady Blinov	Independent	675	0.48%
Roman Murashov	Independent	445	0.32%
against all		16,316	11.63%
Total		141,014	100%

=== 1999 ===
==== Declared candidates ====
- Ivan Altyshev (KTR–zSS), concrete worker
- Aleksandr Gorin (Independent), branch manager
- Oleg Karpov (Independent), chemical executive
- Gennady Khodyrev (Independent), former Minister of Russia for Antimonopoly Policy and Entrepreneurship Support (1998–1999), former Member of State Duma (1996–1998), 1997 gubernatorial candidate
- Aleksandr Korimenko (Independent), entrepreneur
- Sergey Leskov (Independent), Chairman of the Dzerzhinsk City Duma (1996–present), 1995 candidate for this seat
- Aleksey Marchenko (LDPR), businessman
- Ardalyon Panteleyev (Independent), incumbent Member of State Duma (1998–present)
- Irina Parfenova (Independent), nonprofit executive
- Alina Radchenko (NDR), Severstal executive
- Svetlana Shalnova (DN), trade executive
- Andrey Tsvetkov (Nikolayev–Fyodorov Bloc), businessman

==== Withdrawn candidates ====
- Yury Gerletsky (Independent), Member of Legislative Assembly of Nizhny Novgorod Oblast (1994–present)

==== Did not file ====
- Andrey Lukyanov (Independent)
- Irina Lukyanova (Independent), militsiya officer
- Vladimir Malichenko (Independent), community activist
- Grigory Medvedev (Independent)
- Yury Novozhilov (Independent)
- Georgy Tikhonov (Independent)
- Aleksandr Vdovkin (Independent), militsiya officer

==== Results ====
Summary of the 19 December 1999 Russian legislative election in the Dzerzhinsk constituency
Candidate	Party	Votes	%
Gennady Khodyrev	Independent	81,724	32.88%
Sergey Leskov	Independent	40,797	16.41%
Alina Radchenko	Our Home – Russia	39,333	15.83%
Ardalyon Panteleyev (incumbent)	Independent	21,525	8.66%
Andrey Tsvetkov	Andrey Nikolayev and Svyatoslav Fyodorov Bloc	4,850	1.95%
Irina Parfenova	Independent	4,679	1.88%
Aleksey Marchenko	Liberal Democratic Party	3,803	1.53%
Aleksandr Korimenko	Independent	2,968	1.19%
Svetlana Shalnova	Spiritual Heritage	2,704	1.09%
Oleg Karpov	Independent	2,670	1.07%
Ivan Altyshev	Communists and Workers of Russia - for the Soviet Union	2,485	1.00%
Aleksandr Gorin	Independent	1,655	0.67%
against all		35,058	14.11%
Total		248,546	100%

=== 2002 ===
==== Declared candidates ====
- Vladimir Basov (Independent), former Member of City Duma of Nizhny Novgorod (1996–2000), GAZ deputy director
- Yury Demin (Independent), union leader
- Viktor Kazimirov (Independent), metal worker
- Aleksandr Kirin (Independent), Member of Dzerzhinsk City Duma (2000–present)
- Alina Radchenko (Independent), Severstal executive, 1999 candidate for this seat
- Eduard Savenko (Limonov) (Independent), chairman of the National Bolshevik Party (1993–present), writer

==== Results ====
Summary of the 31 March 2002 by-election in the Dzerzhinsk constituency
Candidate	Party	Votes	%
Vladimir Basov	Independent	51,973	35.66%
Alina Radchenko	Independent	29,758	20.42%
Yury Demin	Independent	14,089	9.67%
Eduard Savenko (Limonov)	Independent	9,584	6.58%
Aleksandr Kirin	Independent	7,478	5.13%
Viktor Kazimirov	Independent	3,002	2.06%
against all		23,038	15.81%
Total		145,760	100%

=== 2003 ===
==== Declared candidates ====
- Vladimir Basov (CPRF), incumbent Member of State Duma (2002–present)
- Yury Bratukhin (Independent), pensioner
- Aleksandr Fyodorov (Independent), Member of Pavlovsky District Municipal Assembly (1996–present), businessman, 1993 candidate for this seat
- Gulya Khodyreva (Rodina), Head of the Nizhny Novgorod Oblast Administration Department of Public Affairs, wife of Governor of Nizhny Novgorod Oblast Gennady Khodyrev
- Aleksey Kostin (LDPR), Nizhny Novgorod Academy of Architecture and Civil Engineering lecturer
- Aleksandr Linev (ORP Rus'), paramedic
- Artyom Nasledskov (Independent), transportation executive
- Ardalyon Panteleyev (RPP-PSS), former Member of State Duma (1998–1999)
- Alina Radchenko (Independent), nonprofit chairwoman, 1999 and 2002 candidate for this seat
- Aleksandr Romanov (Independent), insolvency liquidator
- Dmitry Shurov (Independent), Mayor of Vorsma (2000–present)
- Vladimir Stalmakhov (Independent), businessman, banker

==== Failed to qualify ====
- Aleksandr Tarlakovsky (Independent), lawyer

==== Did not file ====
- Nikolay Nikolayev (KP Unity), engineer

==== Results ====
Summary of the 7 December 2003 Russian legislative election in the Dzerzhinsk constituency
Candidate	Party	Votes	%
Vladimir Stalmakhov	Independent	56,311	25.60%
Vladimir Basov (incumbent)	Communist Party	36,970	16.81%
Alina Radchenko	Independent	29,083	13.22%
Gulya Khodyreva	Rodina	26,563	12.08%
Dmitry Shurov	Independent	22,364	10.17%
Aleksey Kostin	Liberal Democratic Party	5,694	2.59%
Aleksandr Fyodorov	Independent	4,008	1.82%
Ardalyon Panteleyev	Russian Pensioners' Party-Party of Social Justice	3,522	1.60%
Aleksandr Romanov	Independent	3,003	1.37%
Aleksandr Linev	United Russian Party Rus'	1,169	0.53%
Yury Bratukhin	Independent	789	0.36%
Artyom Nasledskov	Independent	569	0.26%
against all		26,636	12.11%
Total		220,032	100%
