= Gorbatov =

Gorbatov (Russian: Гoрбaтoв, masculine) or Gorbatova (Гoрбaтoвa, feminine) may refer to:

People

- Alexander Gorbatov (1891–1973), Soviet general
- Boris Gorbatov, Russian author whose work The Youth of the Fathers was the first one performed in Belgrade Drama Theater
- Konstantin Gorbatov (1876–1945), Russian painter

Other

- Gorbatov Urban Settlement, a municipal formation which the town of district significance of Gorbatov in Pavlovsky District of Nizhny Novgorod Oblast, Russia is incorporated as
- Gorbatov (inhabited locality), several inhabited localities in Russia

== See also ==
- Red Gorbatov (cattle), a cattle breed first bred in the town of Gorbatov
