= Navashinsky =

Navashinsky (masculine), Navashinskaya (feminine), or Navashinskoye (neuter) may refer to:

- Navashinsky District (1944–2015), a former district of Nizhny Novgorod Oblast, Russia
- Navashinsky Urban Okrug (est. 2015), a municipal formation into which the town of oblast significance of Navashino in Nizhny Novgorod Oblast, Russia, is incorporated
