= Bogorodsk =

Bogorodsk (Russian: Богородск) is the name of several inhabited localities in Russia.

== Modern localities ==
Urban localities

- Bogorodsk, Bogorodsky District, Nizhny Novgorod Oblast, a town in Bogorodsky District of Nizhny Novgorod Oblast; administratively incorporated as a town of district significance

Rural localities

- Bogorodsk, Komi Republic, a selo in Bogorodsk Selo Administrative Territory of Kortkerossky District of the Komi Republic
- Bogorodsk, Voznesensky District, Nizhny Novgorod Oblast, a settlement in Blagodatovsky Selsoviet of Voznesensky District of Nizhny Novgorod Oblast
- Bogorodsk, Omsk Oblast, a village in Nikolsky Rural Okrug of Tyukalinsky District of Omsk Oblast
- Bogorodsk, Kungursky District, Perm Krai, a selo in Kungursky District, Perm Krai
- Bogorodsk, Oktyabrsky District, Perm Krai, a selo in Oktyabrsky District, Perm Krai

== Renamed localities ==
- Bogorodsk, original name of the town of Noginsk (in Moscow Oblast) in 1781–1930
