= Project 23630 replenishment oiler =

Russian replenishment oiler class

Class overview
- Name: Project 23630
- Builders: Okskaya Shipyard, Navashino
- Operators: Russian Navy
- Built: 2024–present
- Planned: 2
- Building: 2

General characteristics
- Type: Replenishment oiler
- Displacement: 4,700 tons
- Length: 86 m (282 ft)
- Speed: 12 kn (22 km/h; 14 mph)
- Range: 2,500 nmi (4,600 km; 2,900 mi)
- Endurance: 30 days
- Complement: 29

Project 23630 is a series of small-size replenishment oilers built by Okskaya Shipyard for the Russian Navy. It is planned for a series of vessels to be built, with the name of the second vessel Yuri Khaliullin (named after rear admiral Yuri Khaliullin) being announced during the laying down ceremony for the lead ship Argun.

== Ships ==
Name	Builder	Laid down	Launched	Commissioned	Fleet	Status
Argun	Okskaya Shipyard, Navashino	18 April 2024				Laid down
Yuri Khaliullin	Okskaya Shipyard, Navashino	5 June 2025				Laid down

== See also ==
- List of active Russian Navy ships
- Future of the Russian Navy
