= Vorsma =

Town in Nizhny Novgorod Oblast, Russia

Vorsma Ворсма
- Town
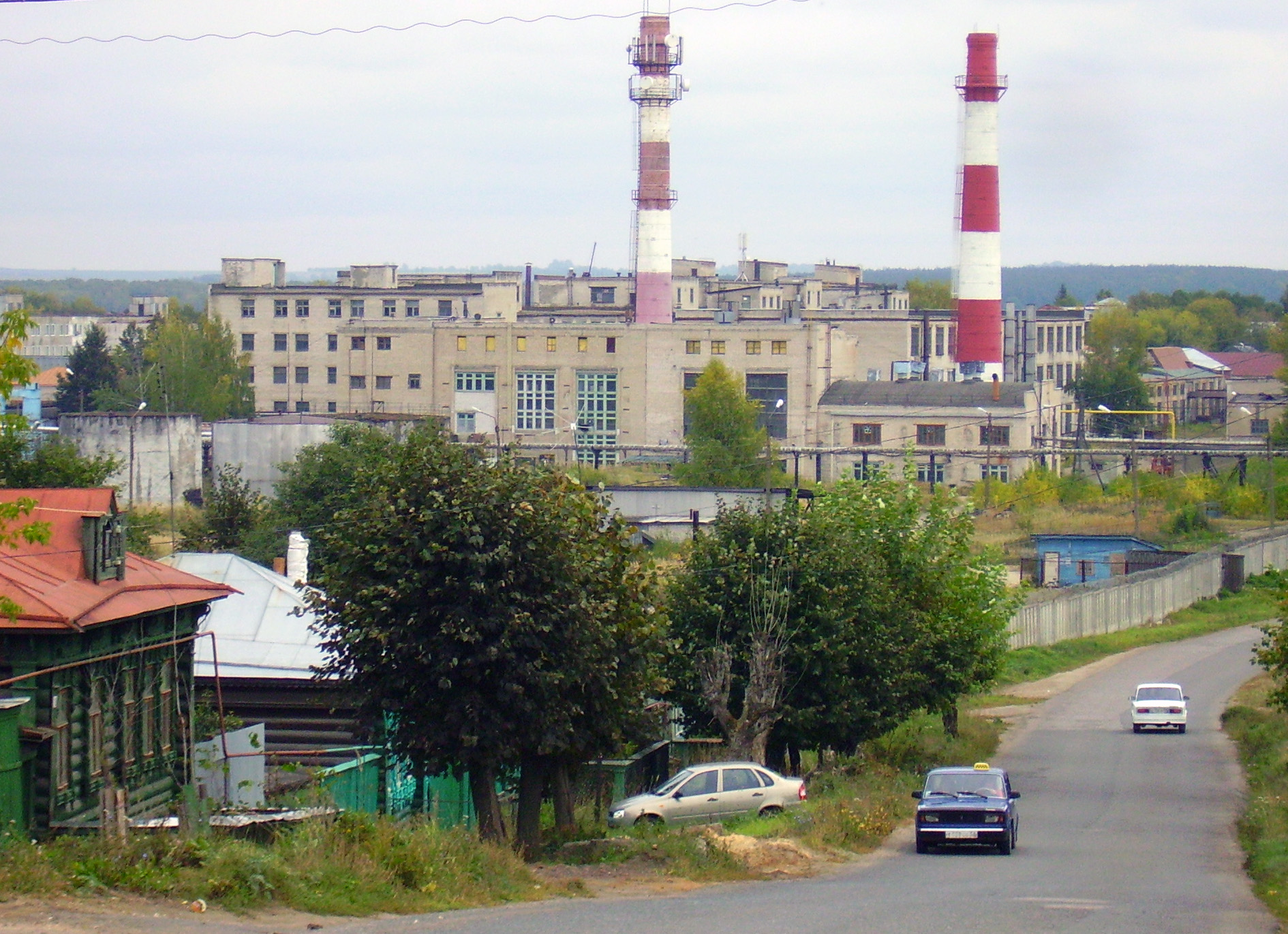
- Zakharovskaya Street in Vorsma

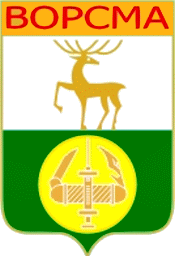
- Coat of arms
- Interactive map of Vorsma
- Location of Vorsma Vorsma (Nizhny Novgorod Oblast)
- Coordinates: 55°59′N 43°15′E
- Country: Russia
- Federal subject: Nizhny Novgorod Oblast
- Administrative district: Pavlovsky District
- Town of district significanceSelsoviet: Vorsma
- First mentioned: 16th century
- Town status since: 1955

Population (2010 Census)
  - Total: 11,620
  - Estimate (2021): 10,162 (−12.5%)

Administrative status
  - Capital of: Pavlovsky District, town of district significance of Vorsma

Municipal status
  - Municipal district: Pavlovsky Municipal District
  - Urban settlement: Vorsma Urban Settlement
  - Capital of: Pavlovsky Municipal District, Vorsma Urban Settlement
- Time zone: UTC+3 (MSK)
- Postal codes: 606120, 606121
- OKTMO ID: 22642103001

Vorsma (Russian: Во́рсма) is a town in Pavlovsky District of Nizhny Novgorod Oblast, Russia, located on the Kishma River (Oka's tributary), 71 kilometers (44 mi) southwest of Nizhny Novgorod, the administrative center of the oblast. Population: 11,620 (2010 census); 12,629 (2002 census); 13,648 (1989 Soviet census).

== History ==
The village of Vorsma was first mentioned in the 16th century. It was granted town status in 1955.

== Administrative and municipal status ==
Within the framework of administrative divisions, it is incorporated within Pavlovsky District as the town of district significance of Vorsma. As a municipal division, the town of district significance of Vorsma is incorporated within Pavlovsky Municipal District as Vorsma Urban Settlement.
