= Red Gorbatov cattle =

Breed of cattle

Red Gorbatov cattle (Russian: Kpacнaя гopбaтoвcкaя, Krasnaya gorbatovskaya) are a dairy cattle breed from Gorbatov, Russia.

== Origins ==
The breed originated in Nizhegorod province in the 19th century from crossing Tyrolean cattle onto the local Priokski (Great Russian) cattle. A herdbook was established in 1921. Blood type analysis shows a relationship to Danish Red and Angeln cattle.

== Characteristics ==
Animals are solid red in various shades, sometimes with white on the udder. They have a pink muzzle and white horns with black tips. Cows average 122 cm tall at the withers and weigh 470 kg on average. Bulls average 133 cm in height and 830 kg weight. The breed is claimed to have good resistance to leucosis, tuberculosis and brucellosis.

== Population and distribution ==
From the breed's formation in Nizhegorod province in the 19th century it spread to the floodplain of the Oka river in the Vladimir and Ivanov regions and the Chuvash ASSR. In 1980 there were estimated to be 74,000 breeding females. By 1990 this had fallen to 27,400.
