= Gorbatov (inhabited locality) =

Gorbatov (Russian: Горбатов) is the name of several inhabited localities in Russia.

Urban localities

- Gorbatov, Nizhny Novgorod Oblast, a town in Pavlovsky District of Nizhny Novgorod Oblast

Rural localities

- Gorbatov, Rostov Oblast, a khutor in Bokovskoye Rural Settlement of Bokovsky District in Rostov Oblast
