= Kishma =

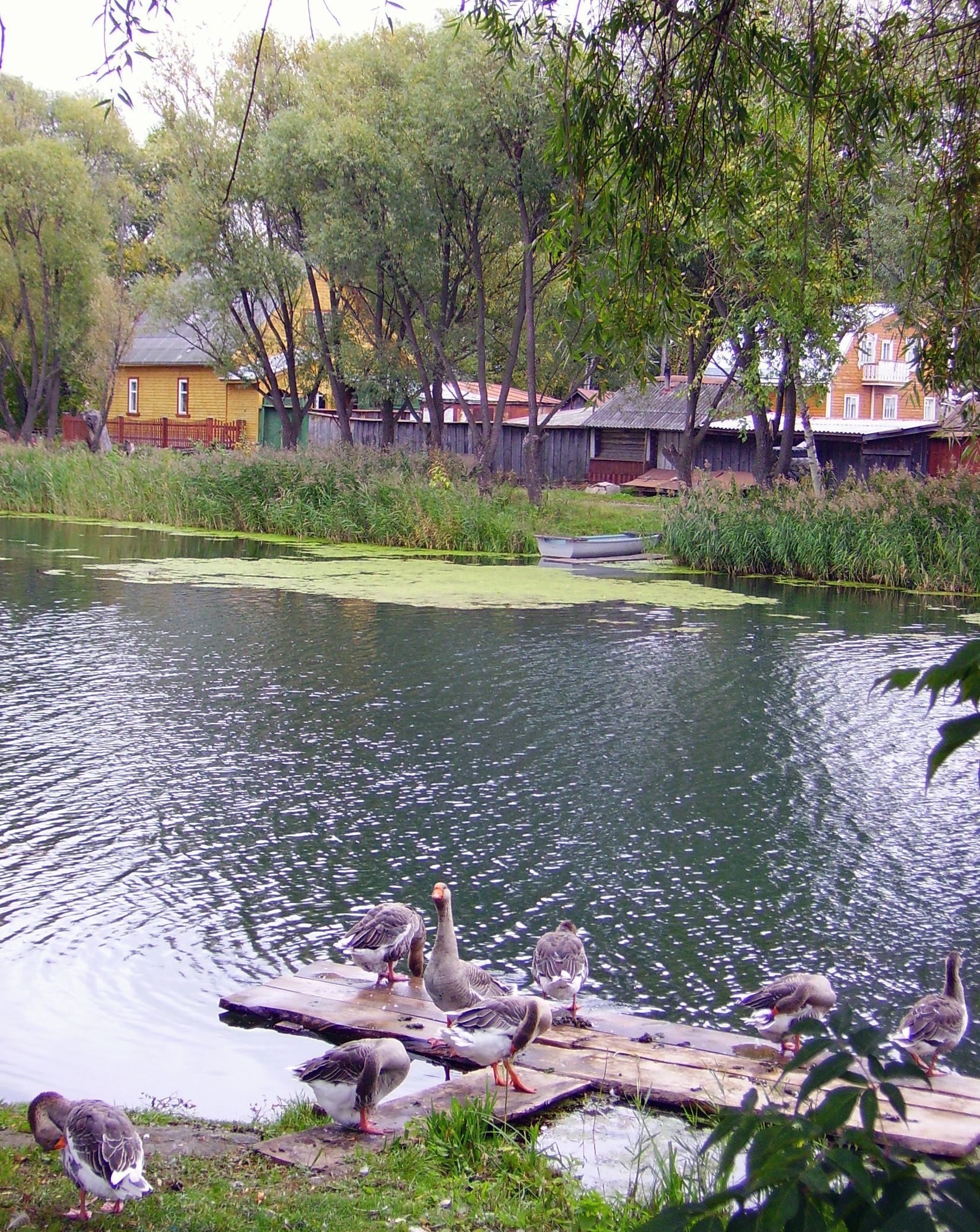
- Kishma in Vorsma
- Native name: Кишма (Russian)

Location
- Country: Russia

Physical characteristics
- Mouth: Oka
  - coordinates: 56.0625°N 43.1198°E
- Length: 71 km (44 mi)
- Basin size: 795 km^{2} (307 sq mi)

Basin features
- Progression: Oka→ Volga→ Caspian Sea

Kishma (Russian: Кишма) is a river in Nizhny Novgorod Oblast in Russia and a right tributary of the Oka. The length of the river is 71 km (44 mi). The area of its basin is 795 km^{2} (307 sq mi).
