= Para (Russia) =

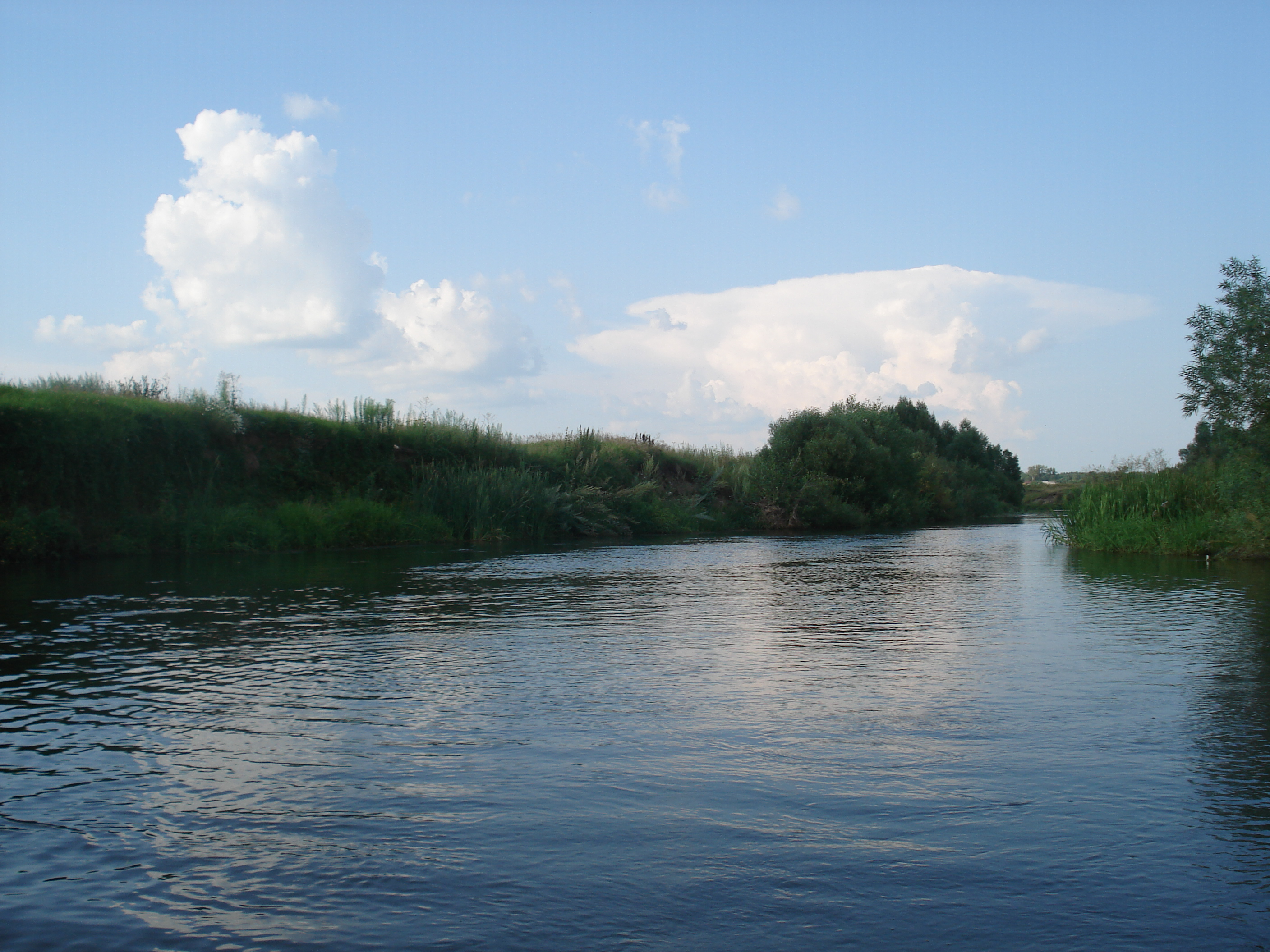
- Native name: Пара (Russian)

Location
- Country: Russia

Physical characteristics
- Mouth: Oka
  - coordinates: 54°20′26″N 40°54′54″E
- Length: 192 km (119 mi)
- Basin size: 3,590 km^{2} (1,390 sq mi)

Basin features
- Progression: Oka→ Volga→ Caspian Sea

The Para (Russian: Пара́) is a river in Ryazan Oblast in Russia, a right tributary of the Oka. The length of the river is 192 kilometres (119 mi). The area of its basin is 3,590 square kilometres (1,390 sq mi). The Para freezes up in November and stays icebound until April.
