= Besputa =

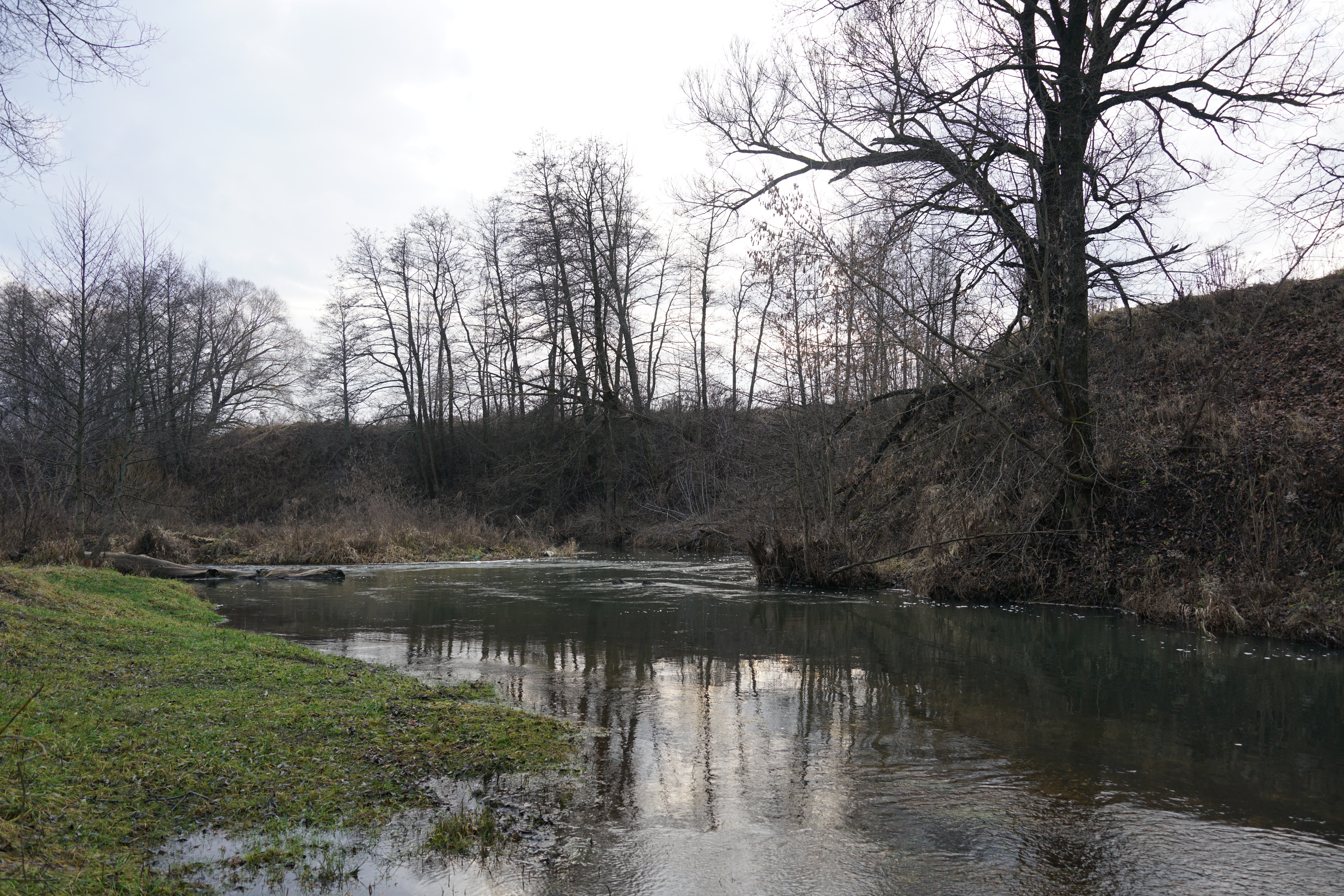
- Native name: Беспута (Russian)

Location
- Country: Russia

Physical characteristics
- Mouth: Oka
  - coordinates: 54.8372°N 37.9715°E
- Length: 70 km (43 mi)
- Basin size: 1,000 km^{2} (390 sq mi)

Basin features
- Progression: Oka→ Volga→ Caspian Sea

The Besputa (Russian: Беспута) is a small river in the Moscow and Tula Oblasts, Russia. It is a right tributary of the Oka. It is 70 kilometres (43 mi) long, and has a drainage basin of 1,000 square kilometres (390 sq mi).
