= Bogorodsky District, Nizhny Novgorod Oblast =

Bogorodsky District Богородский район (Russian)
- District
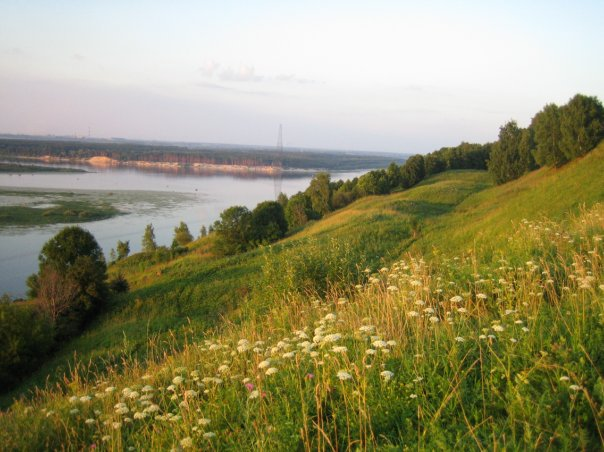
- View from the selo of Dudenevo on the Oka River and the Shukhov Tower

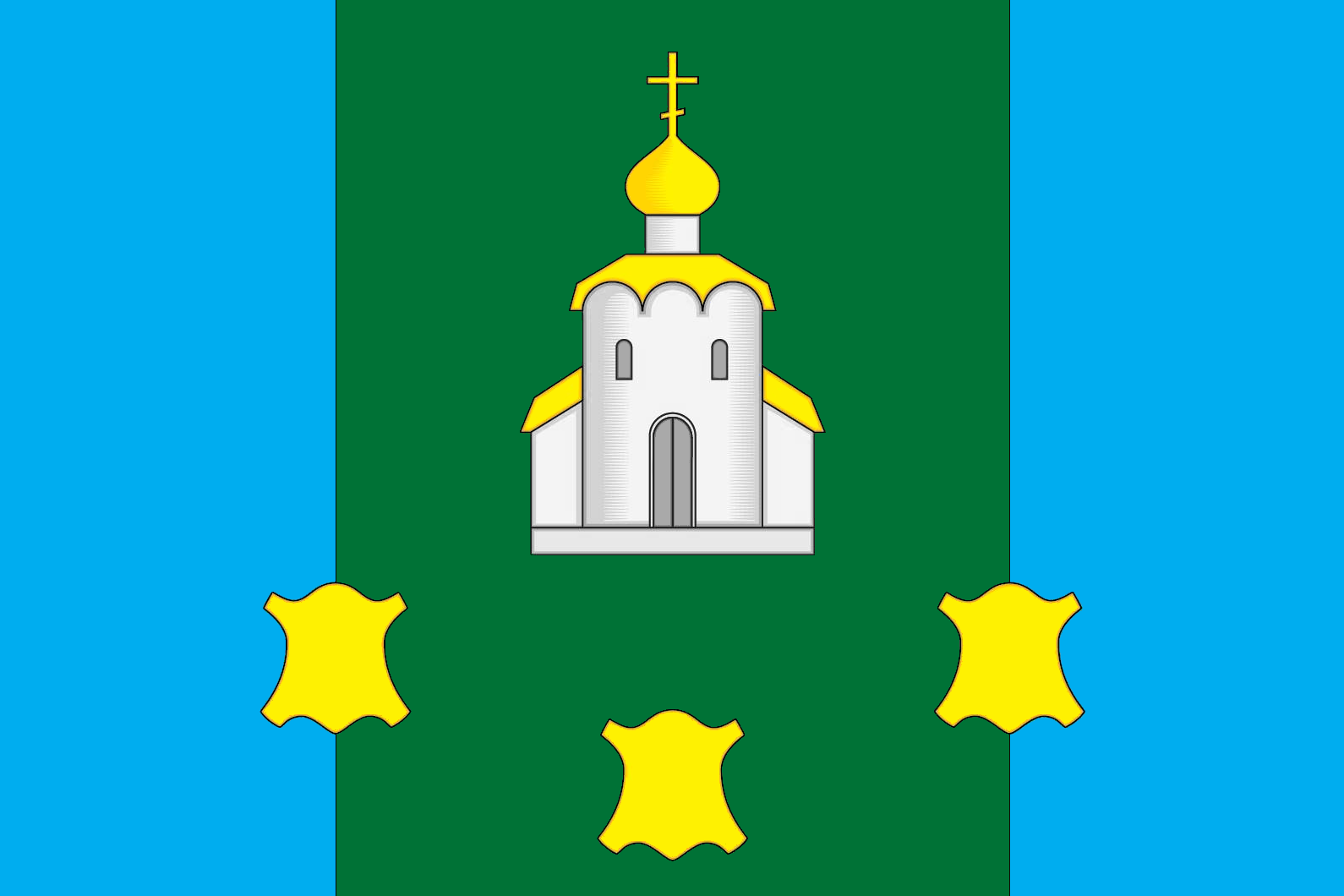
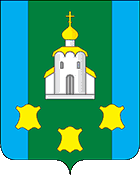
- Flag Coat of arms
- Location of Bogorodsky District in Nizhny Novgorod Oblast
- Coordinates: 56°05′59″N 43°30′26″E
- Country: Russia
- Federal subject: Nizhny Novgorod Oblast
- Established: 1929
- Administrative center: Bogorodsk

Area
  - Total: 1,459 km^{2} (563 sq mi)

Population (2010 Census)
  - Total: 65,677
  - Density: 45.02/km^{2} (116.6/sq mi)
  - Urban: 54.1%
  - Rural: 45.9%

Administrative structure
  - Administrative divisions: 1 Towns of district significance, 7 Selsoviets
  - Inhabited localities: 1 cities/towns, 143 rural localities

Municipal structure
  - Municipally incorporated as: Bogorodsky Municipal District
  - Municipal divisions: 1 urban settlements, 7 rural settlements
- Time zone: UTC+3 (MSK)
- OKTMO ID: 22607000
- Website: http://www.abr.nnov.ru

Bogorodsky District (Russian: Богоро́дский райо́н) is an administrative district (raion), one of the forty in Nizhny Novgorod Oblast, Russia. Municipally, it is incorporated as Bogorodsky Municipal District. It is located in the west of the oblast. The area of the district is 1,459 square kilometers (563 sq mi). Its administrative center is the town of Bogorodsk. Population: 65,677 (2010 Census); 30,864 (2002 census); 33,693 (1989 Soviet census). The population of Bogorodsk accounts for 54.1% of the district's total population.

== History ==
The district was established in 1929.
