= Pavlovo, Pavlovsky District, Nizhny Novgorod Oblast =

Town in Nizhny Novgorod Oblast, Russia

Pavlovo Павлово
- Town
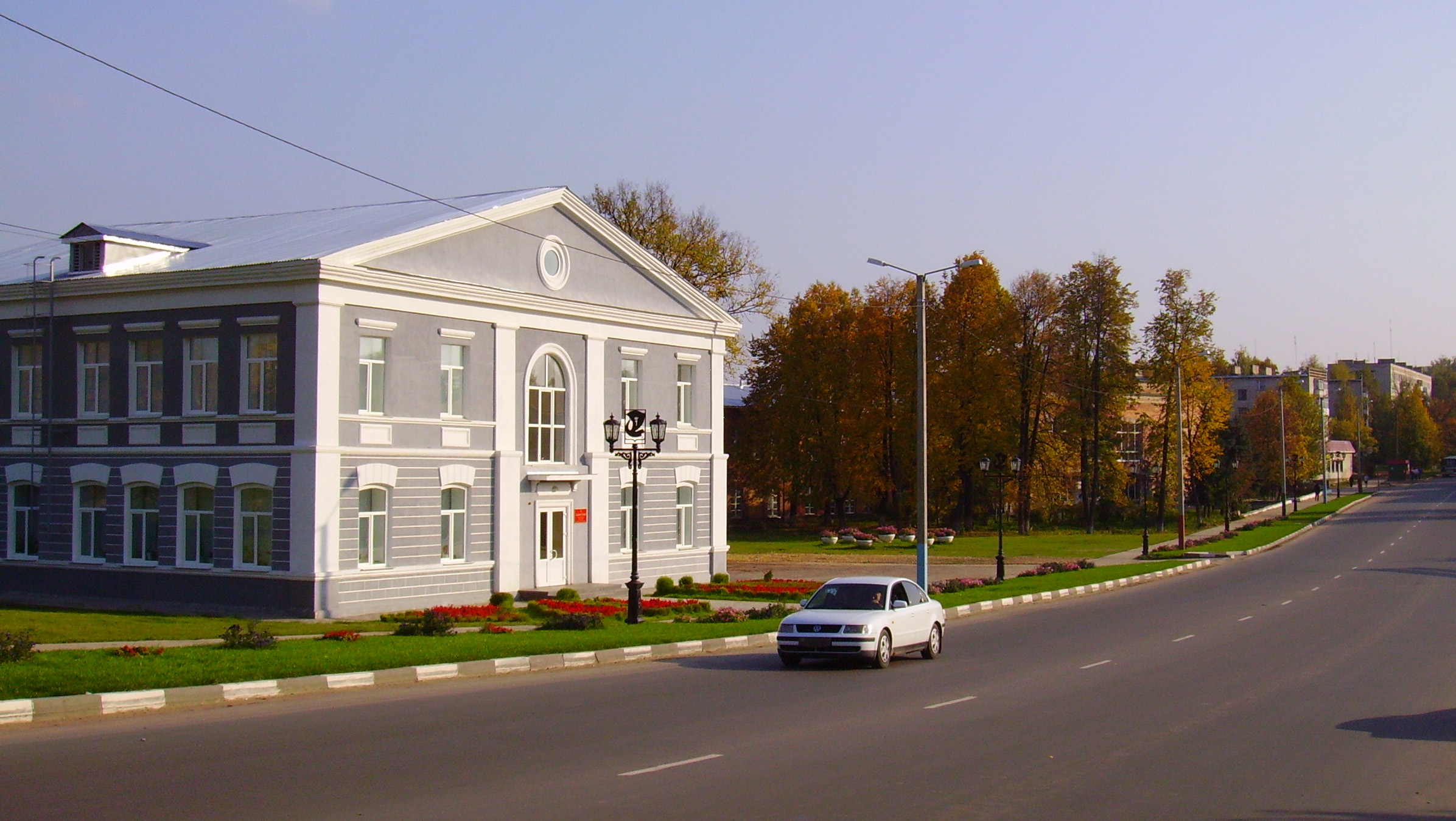
- Town administration

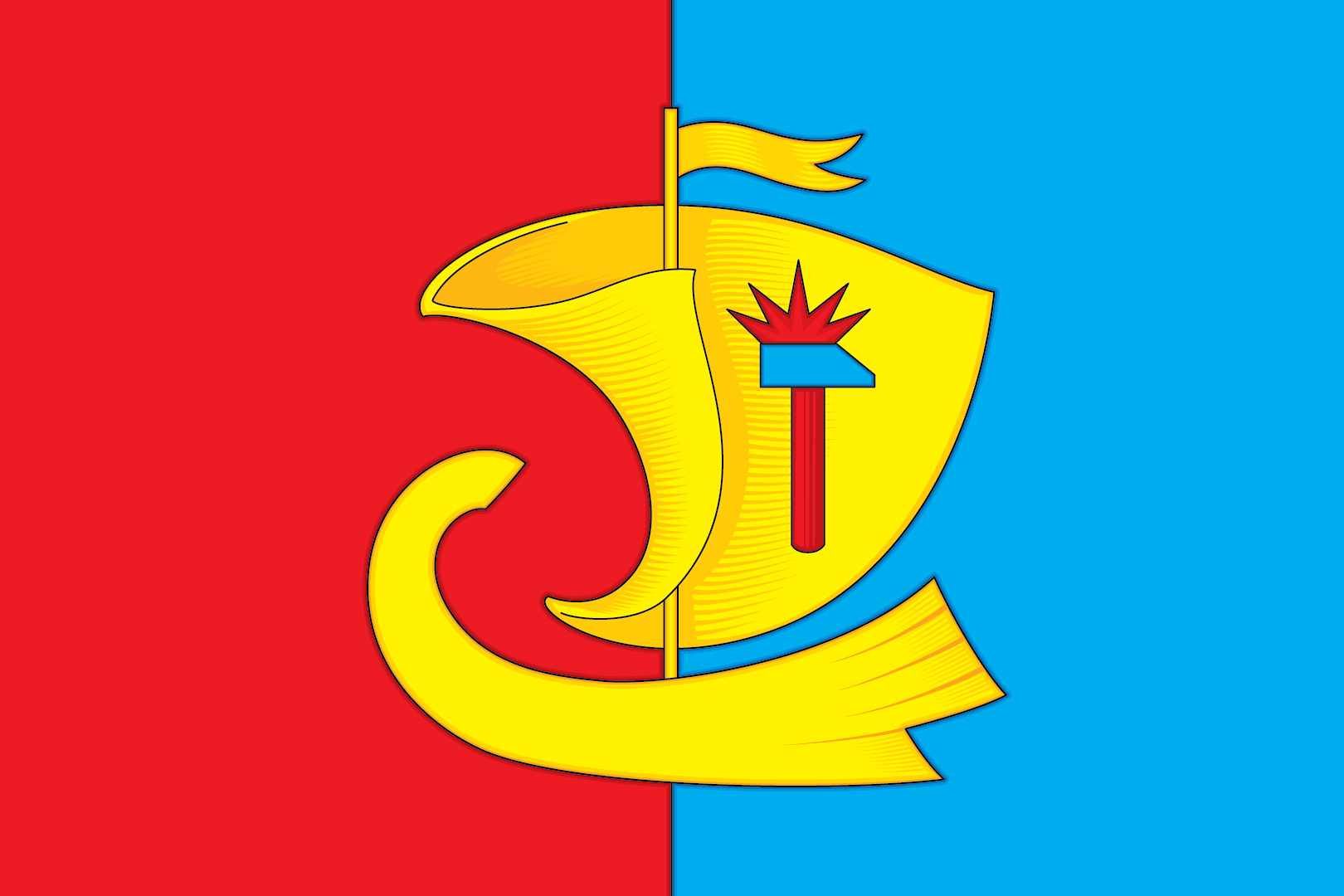
- Flag Coat of arms
- Interactive map of Pavlovo
- Location of Pavlovo Pavlovo (Nizhny Novgorod Oblast)
- Coordinates: 55°57′55″N 43°04′16″E
- Country: Russia
- Federal subject: Nizhny Novgorod Oblast
- Administrative district: Pavlovsky District
- Town of district significanceSelsoviet: Pavlovo
- First mentioned: April 15, 1566
- Elevation: 120 m (390 ft)

Population (2010 Census)
  - Total: 60,698
  - Estimate (2025): 55,307 (−8.9%)
  - Rank: 270th in 2010

Administrative status
  - Capital of: Pavlovsky District, town of district significance of Pavlovo

Municipal status
  - Municipal district: Pavlovsky Municipal District
  - Urban settlement: Pavlovo Urban Settlement
  - Capital of: Pavlovsky Municipal District, Pavlovo Urban Settlement
- Time zone: UTC+3 (MSK)
- Postal codes: 606100, 606101, 606103–606108, 606139
- OKTMO ID: 22642101001

Pavlovo population
- 2010 Census: 60,698
- 2002 Census: 64,814
- 1989 Census: 71,534
- 1979 Census: 68,353

Pavlovo (Russian: Па́влово), also known as Pavlovo-na-Oke (Russian: Па́влово-на-Оке́), is a town and the administrative center of Pavlovsky District in Nizhny Novgorod Oblast, Russia, located on the right bank of Oka River in the northwestern part of the Volga Upland. As of the 2010 Census, its population was 60,698.

== History ==
Pavlovo was first mentioned in a letter by Ivan the Terrible dated April 15, 1566, which is considered to be the founding year of the town.

== Administrative and municipal status ==
Within the framework of administrative divisions, Pavlovo serves as the administrative center of Pavlovsky District. As an administrative division, it is incorporated within Pavlovsky District as the town of district significance of Pavlovo. As a municipal division, the town of district significance of Pavlovo is incorporated within Pavlovsky Municipal District as Pavlovo Urban Settlement.

== Economy ==
Pavlovo has a long tradition of metalworking industries. One of the main enterprises in the city is Pavlovo Bus Plant (PAZ).

=== Agriculture ===
Lemon trees suitable for indoor cultivation were developed in Pavlovo in the 19th century and are grown throughout Russia.
