= Nizhny Novgorod State University of Architecture and Civil Engineering =

Public university in Russia

- Нижегородский государственный архитектурно-строительный университет
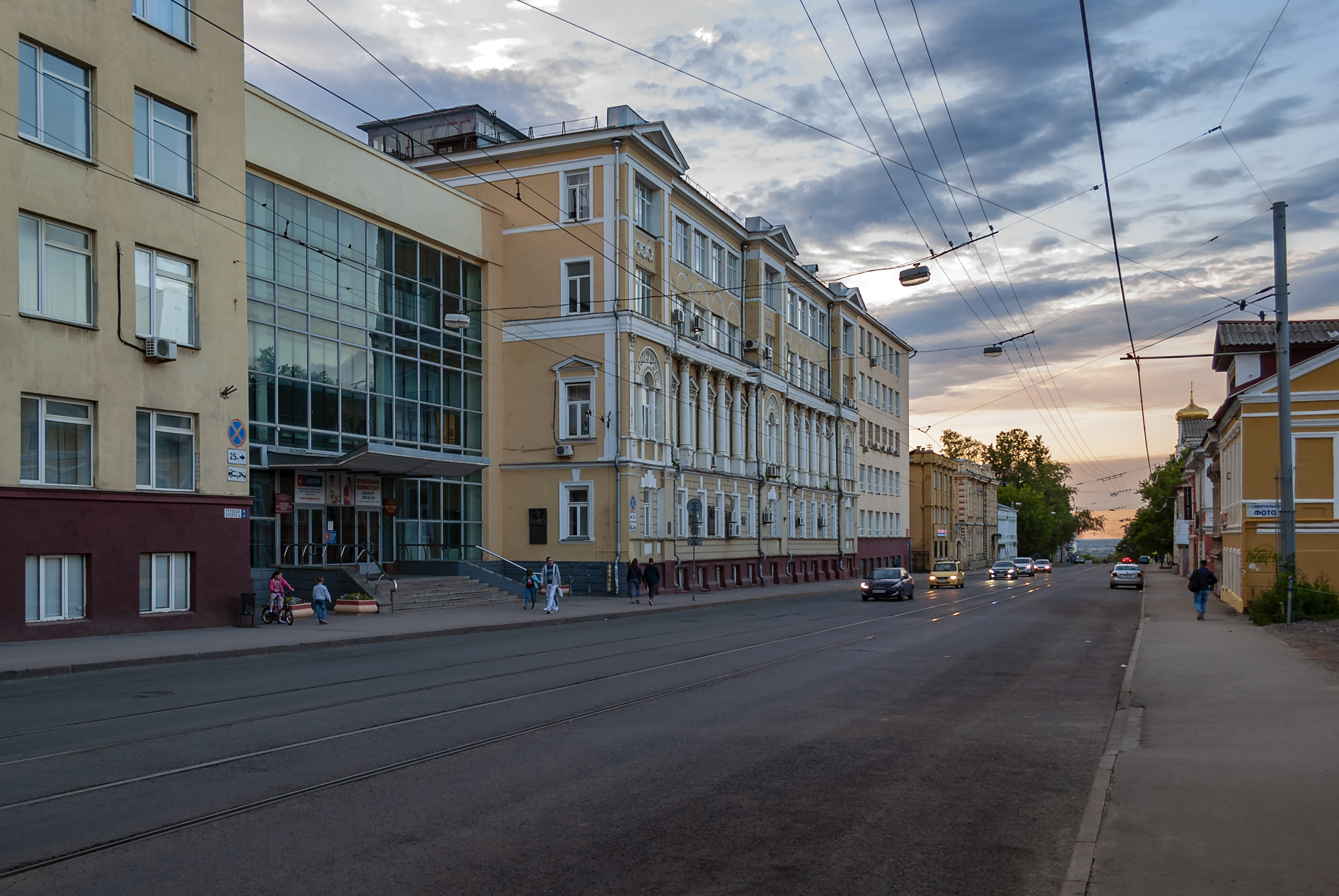
- The main building of the University, July 2019
- Motto: Let us build the future together!
- Type: Public university
- Established: 1930
- Accreditation: Certificate of State Accreditation issued by the Federal Service for Supervision in Education and Science
- Rector: Dmitry Lvovich Shchegolev
- Address: 65 Ilyinskaya Street, 603950, Nizhny Novgorod, Russia; 56.3190°N 43.9879°E
- Campus: Urban
- Website: www.nngasu.ru
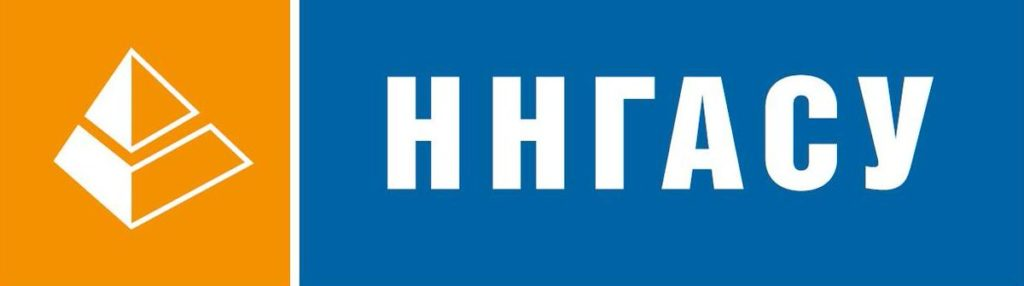

Nizhny Novgorod State University of Architecture and Civil Engineering or NNGASU (Russian: Нижегоро́дский госуда́рственный архитекту́рно-строи́тельный университе́т - ННГАСУ) is a public higher educational institution and a major center in the fields of architecture, urban planning, environmental engineering, and construction sciences. Established in 1930, NNGA SU has a rich history of contributing to architectural and engineering education in Russia, located in the historic center of Nizhny Novgorod.

As an important scientific and research hub, NNGASU supports a wide range of research activities across 13 scientific fields. The university is home to 18 scientific and pedagogical schools, covering 91 scientific directions within its departments. This extensive research network contributes significantly to the development of these disciplines at both regional and national levels.

NNGASU is also engaged in international collaborations and exchange programs, partnering with universities worldwide to enhance educational and research opportunities. The university’s faculty and students participate in international conferences, contributing to global academic discourse. Notable alumni of NNGASU have made significant impacts in their fields, reflecting the high quality of education and training provided by the university.

== History ==
Nizhny Novgorod State University of Architecture and Civil Engineering was founded in 1930 as the Nizhny Novgorod Institute of Civil Engineering. The university was formed on the basis of the Faculty of Engineering and Construction of Nizhny Novgorod State University during the division of NSU into six specialized institutes. In 1932 the institute was renamed as Gorky Civil Engineering Institute, which in 1938 was named after V. P. Chkalov.

In 1932 the first graduation in the history of the Institute took place - 32 students, who had come to the higher school from the Novosibirsk State University in 1930, received their civil engineer diplomas, and in 1935 the first intake of 213 engineers to the institute was carried out. During the first decade the institute trained more than 1000 specialists.

The World War II period slowed down, but did not stop the development of the institute. During the war there were 374 specialists graduated. In 1944 it was opened a new specialty - Hydraulic engineering construction of river structures and hydroelectric power plants. Since 1950s the institute developed the activities of student construction teams. Student design bureau was formed at the institute.

After the war the institute started to open new specialties - Urban building (1961), Production of building products and constructions (1962), Natural and wastewater treatment (1965), Architecture (1966), Highways (1970).

From 1985 to 2005, 39 scientists of the university became doctors of sciences.

In the 1990s, the university underwent reorganization changes. In 1993, the institute was given the status of academy, and in 1997 - the status of a university. Since that time the university has retained the name: Nizhny Novgorod State University of Architecture and Civil Engineering (NNGASU).

By the early 2020s a wide profile university, implementing a range of basic educational programs in 14 enlarged groups. At the same time, the architectural and construction branch of training remains dominant in terms of the number of students. During 90 years of existence the university has trained over 80 thousand specialists, 12 thousand bachelors and more than 1 thousand masters.

The modern structure of the university includes 2 institutes, 5 faculties, 59 departments. At university there are 22 scientific and pedagogical schools, uniting more than 100 directions in 13 branches of science. In 2006 the university founded the "Privolzhsky scientific journal".

== Structure ==
- General Engineering Faculty
- Faculty of Engineering and Construction
- Faculty of Engineering and Environmental Systems and Constructions
- Faculty of Architecture and Design
- Faculty of Continuing Education
- Institute of Business Technology
- Intersectoral Institute of Professional Development and Retraining
- Center for pre-university training and education of foreign citizens

== Awards and Recognitions ==
- Order of the Red Banner of Labor (1980) - Awarded for high achievements in science, personnel training, and implementation of research results in production.
- 100 Best Universities in Russia - Recognized in the years 2005, 2009, and 2012.
- Leader of the National Economy (2006) - For significant contributions to the national economy.
- 100 Best Russian Organizations in Science and Education (2010)
- 100 Best Russian Universities in International Cooperation (2012)
- Best University in Russia by the "National Recognition" Rating (2019)
- 100 Best Educational Institutions of Higher Education of the Russian Federation (2020)
