= Navashinsky District =

Navashinsky District Навашинский район (Russian)
- District
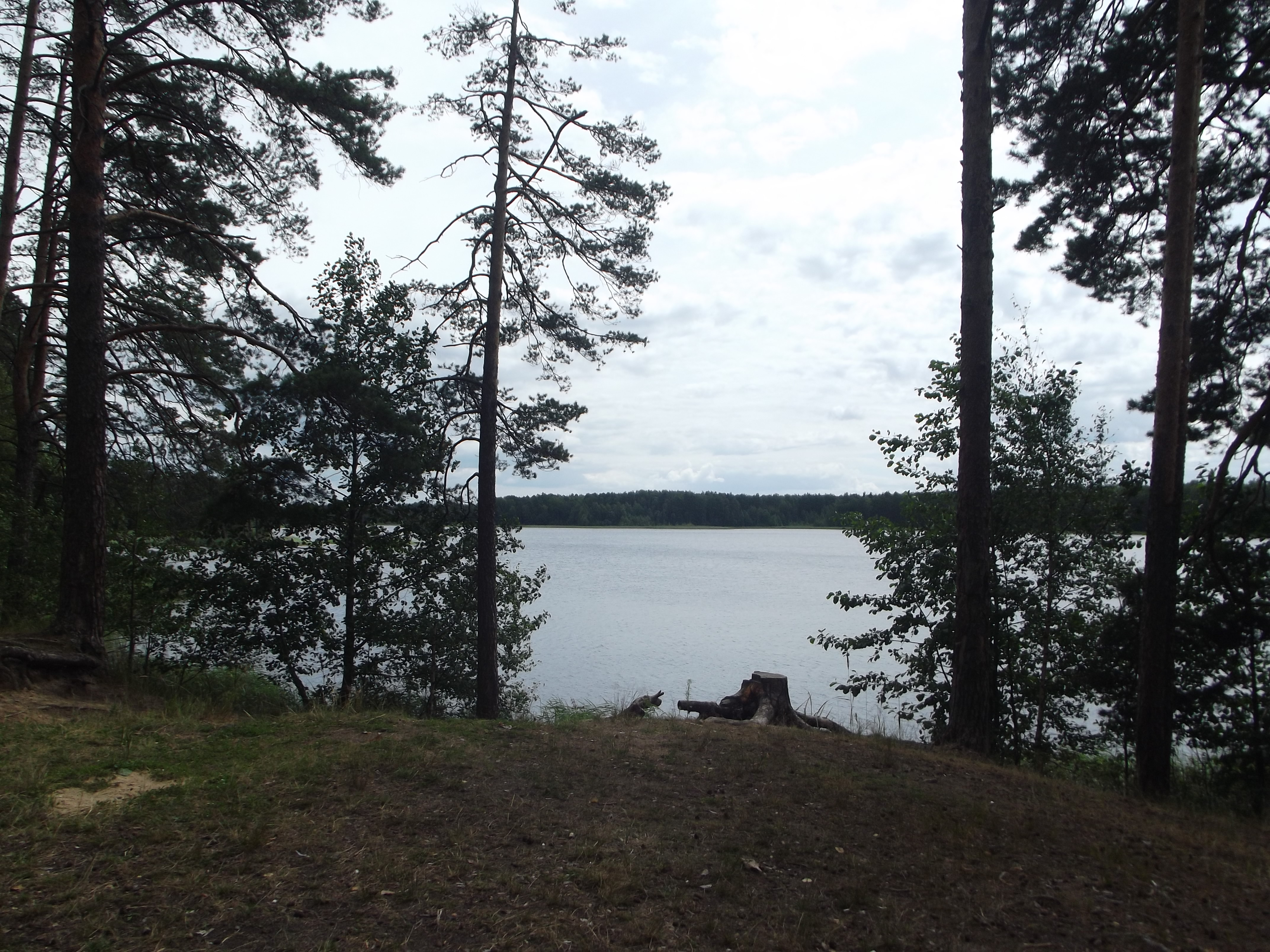
- Bolshoye Svyatoye Lake, a protected area of Russia in Navashinsky District

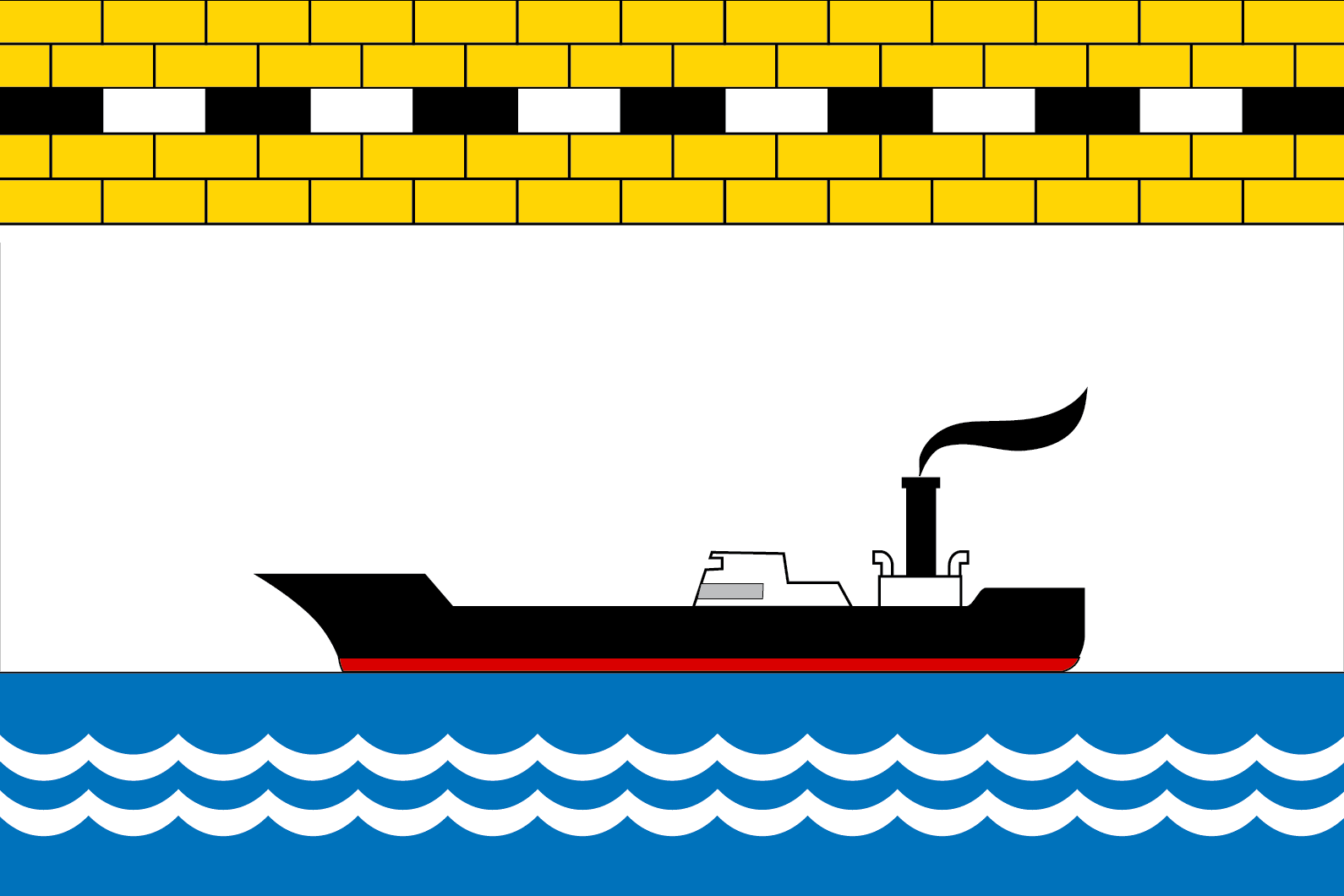
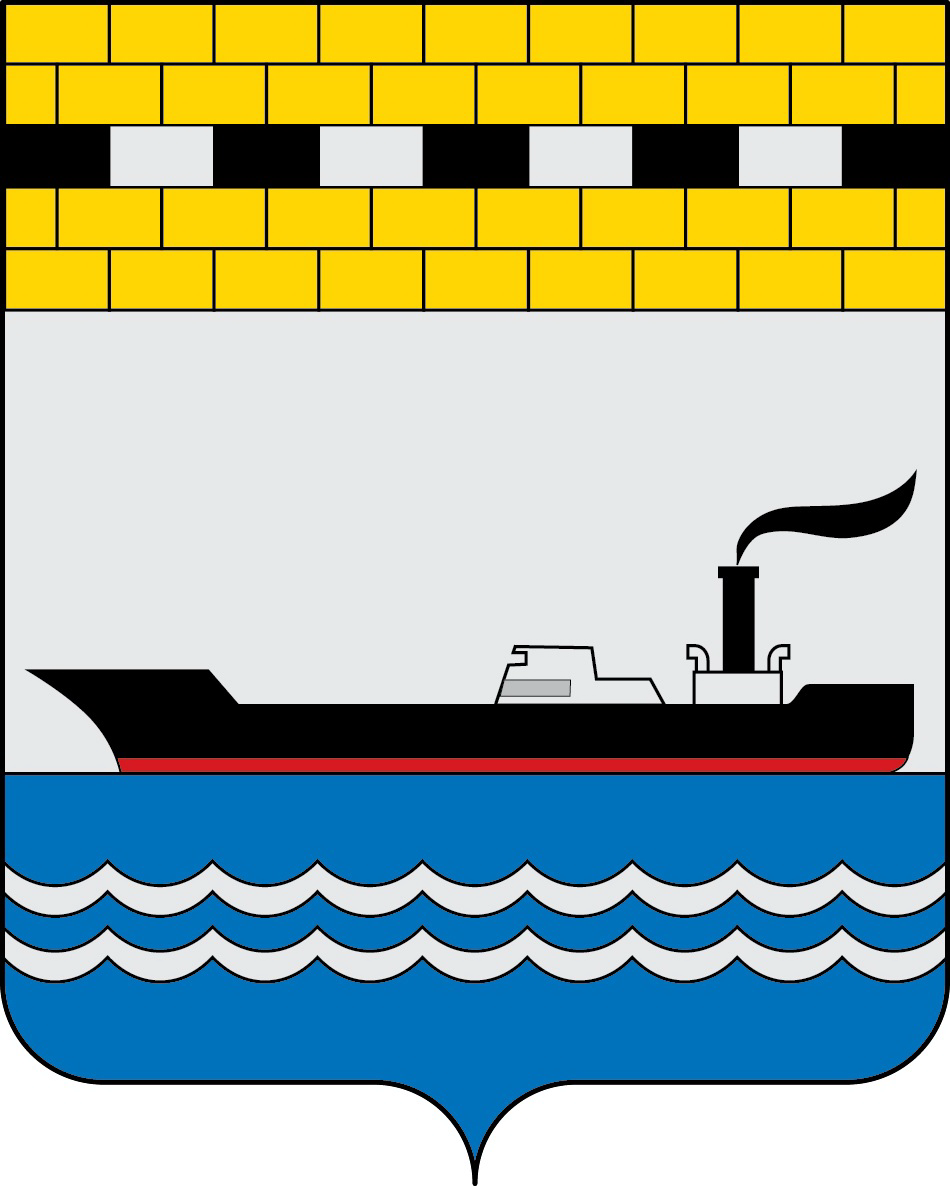
- Flag Coat of arms
- Location of Navashinsky District in Nizhny Novgorod Oblast
- Coordinates: 55°32′N 42°12′E
- Country: Russia
- Federal subject: Nizhny Novgorod Oblast
- Established: 1944
- Abolished: May 24, 2015
- Administrative center: Navashino

Area
  - Total: 1,277.5 km^{2} (493.2 sq mi)

Population (2010 Census)
  - Total: 24,296
  - Density: 19.018/km^{2} (49.257/sq mi)
  - Urban: 71.6%
  - Rural: 28.4%

Administrative structure
  - Administrative divisions: 1 Towns of district significance, 4 Selsoviets
  - Inhabited localities: 1 cities/towns, 50 rural localities

Municipal structure
  - Municipally incorporated as: Navashinsky Municipal District
  - Municipal divisions: 1 urban settlements, 4 rural settlements
- Time zone: UTC+3 (MSK)
- OKTMO ID: 22730000

Population of Navashinsky District
- 2010 Census: 24,296
- 2002 Census: 27,617
- 1989 Census: 31,537
- 1979 Census: 34,471

Navashinsky District (Russian: Нава́шинский райо́н) was an administrative and municipal district (raion) in Nizhny Novgorod Oblast, Russia. It was located in the southwest of the oblast. The area of the district was 1,277.5 square kilometers (493.2 sq mi). Its administrative center was the town of Navashino. As of the 2010 Census, the total population of the district was 24,296, with the population of Navashino accounting for 67.6% of that number.

== History ==
The district was established in 1944 and given its present name in 1960. Per Law #66-Z of May 13, 2015, the district was transformed into a town of oblast significance of Navashino. In a similar manner, Law #58-Z of May 8, 2015 abolished Navashinsky Municipal District and transformed it into Navashinsky Urban Okrug.

== Administrative and municipal divisions ==
As of May 2015, the district was administratively divided into one town of district significance (Navashino) and four selsoviets (comprising fifty rural localities). Municipally, Navashinsky Municipal District was divided into one urban settlement and four rural settlements.
