= Gorbatov, Nizhny Novgorod Oblast =

Town in Nizhny Novgorod Oblast, Russia

Gorbatov Горбатов
- Town
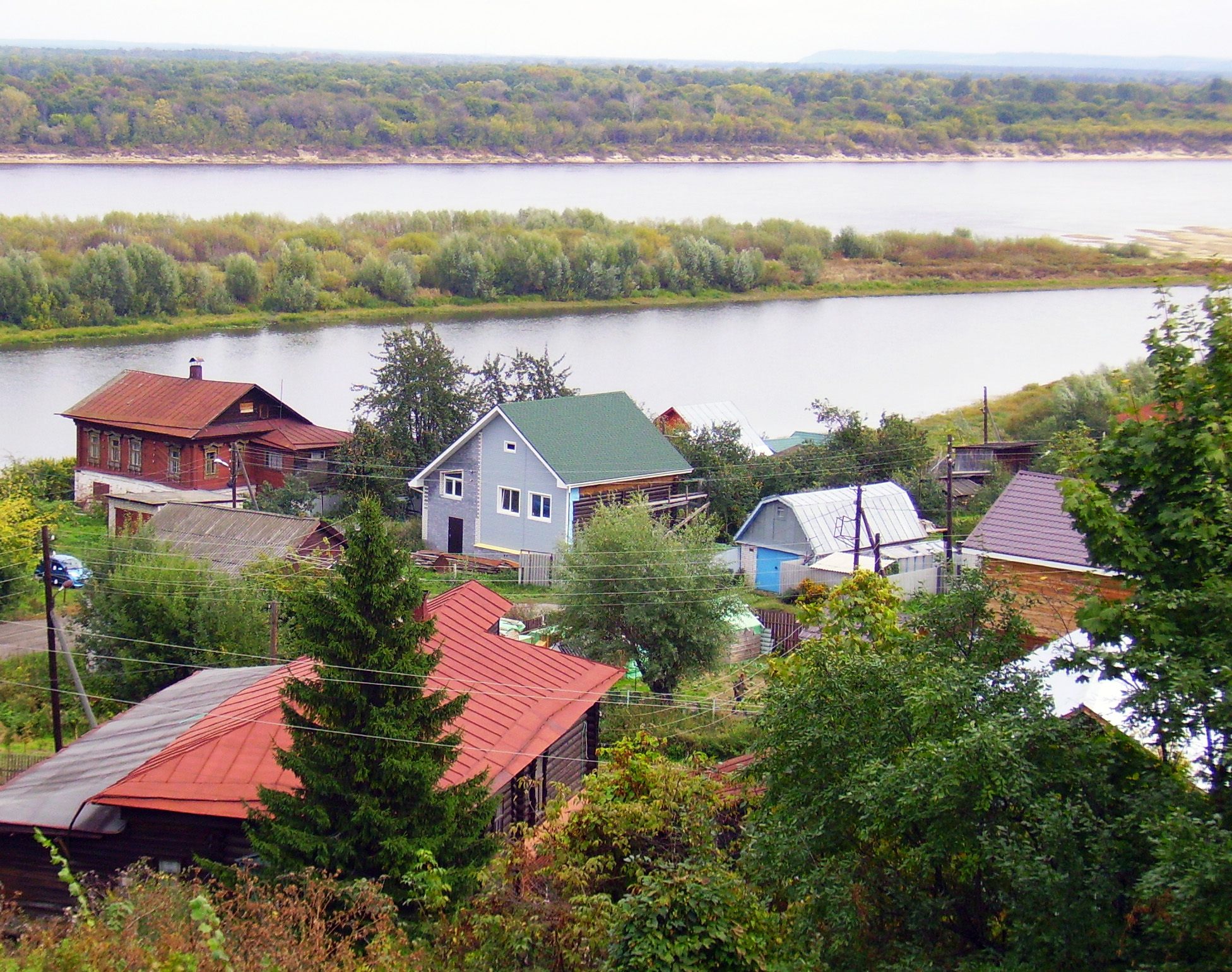
- The Oka River in Gorbatov

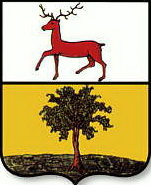
- Coat of arms
- Interactive map of Gorbatov
- Location of Gorbatov Gorbatov (Nizhny Novgorod Oblast)
- Coordinates: 56°08′N 43°04′E
- Country: Russia
- Federal subject: Nizhny Novgorod Oblast
- Administrative district: Pavlovsky District
- Town of district significanceSelsoviet: Gorbatov
- First mentioned: 1565
- Town status since: 1779
- Elevation: 160 m (520 ft)

Population (2010 Census)
  - Total: 2,278
  - Estimate (2025): 1,925 (−15.5%)

Administrative status
  - Capital of: Pavlovsky District, town of district significance of Gorbatov

Municipal status
  - Municipal district: Pavlovsky Municipal District
  - Urban settlement: Gorbatov Urban Settlement
  - Capital of: Pavlovsky Municipal District, Gorbatov Urban Settlement
- Time zone: UTC+3 (MSK)
- Postal code: 606125
- OKTMO ID: 22642105001

Gorbatov (Russian: Горба́тов) is a town in Pavlovsky District of Nizhny Novgorod Oblast, Russia, located on the bank of the Oka River in the Meshchera Lowlands. Population: 2,278 (2010 census); 2,662 (2002 census); 3,552 (1989 Soviet census). It was previously known as Gorbatovo (until 1779).

== History ==
The region was settled by the Meshchera tribe during the Middle Ages. The village of Gorbatovo (Горбатово) was first documented in 1565 as a votchina of Prince Alexander Gorbaty-Shuysky after whom it takes its name. Its growth was owing to the manufacture of ropes and cherry cultivation. In 1779, Gorbatovo was merged with Meshchera sloboda and chartered as a town. Modern Gorbatov is one of Russia's smallest towns.

== Administrative and municipal status ==
Gorbatov Urban Settlement in Pavlovsky Municipal District of Nizhny Novgorod Oblast

Within the framework of administrative divisions, it is, together with sixteen rural localities, incorporated within Pavlovsky District as the town of district significance of Gorbatov. As a municipal division, the town of district significance of Gorbatov is incorporated within Pavlovsky Municipal District as Gorbatov Urban Settlement.
