= Bogorodsk, Bogorodsky District, Nizhny Novgorod Oblast =

Town in Nizhny Novgorod Oblast, Russia

Bogorodsk Богородск
- Town
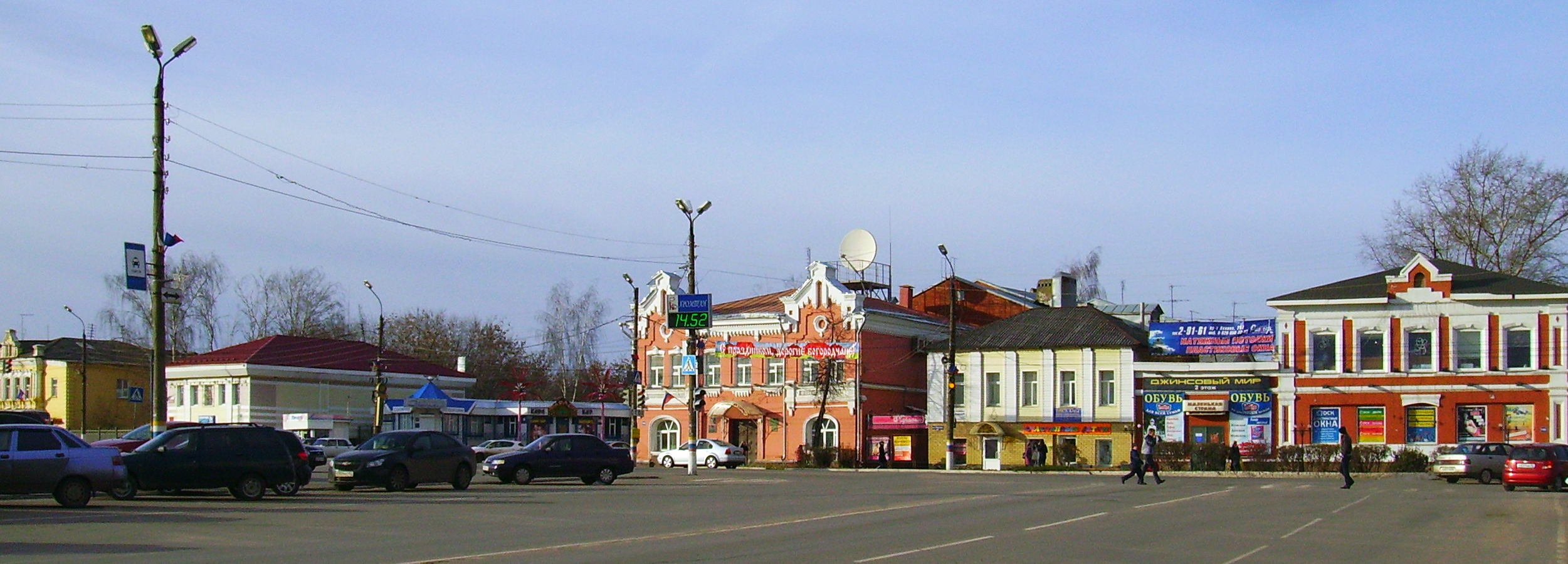
- Krasnaya Square in central Bogorodsk

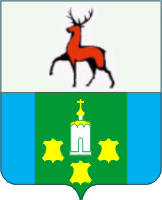
- Coat of arms
- Interactive map of Bogorodsk
- Location of Bogorodsk Bogorodsk (Nizhny Novgorod Oblast)
- Coordinates: 56°07′N 43°30′E
- Country: Russia
- Federal subject: Nizhny Novgorod Oblast
- Administrative district: Bogorodsky District
- Town of district significanceSelsoviet: Bogorodsk
- Known since: 1570
- Town status since: 1923
- Elevation: 131 m (430 ft)

Population (2010 Census)
  - Total: 35,499
  - Estimate (2025): 33,818 (−4.7%)

Administrative status
  - Capital of: Bogorodsky District, town of district significance of Bogorodsk

Municipal status
  - Municipal district: Bogorodsky Municipal District
  - Urban settlement: Bogorodsk Urban Settlement
  - Capital of: Bogorodsky Municipal District, Bogorodsk Urban Settlement
- Time zone: UTC+3 (MSK)
- Postal codes: 607600, 607602, 607603, 607605, 607649
- OKTMO ID: 22607101001
- Website: www.adm-bg.ru

Bogorodsk (Russian: Богоро́дск) is a town and the administrative center of Bogorodsky District in Nizhny Novgorod Oblast, Russia, located 43 kilometers (27 mi) southwest of Nizhny Novgorod, the administrative center of the oblast. Population: 35,499 (2010 census); 37,095 (2002 census); 38,401 (1989 Soviet census).

== History ==
It has been known since 1570 as the village of Bogorodichnoye, Bogoroditskoye, or Bogorodskoye. It was granted town status in 1923.

== Administrative and municipal status ==
Within the framework of administrative divisions, Bogorodsk serves as the administrative center of Bogorodsky District. As an administrative division, it is incorporated within Bogorodsky District as the town of district significance of Bogorodsk. As a municipal division, the town of district significance of Bogorodsk is incorporated within Bogorodsky Municipal District as Bogorodsk Urban Settlement.

== Economy ==
Bogorodsk is one of the oldest centers of the leather industry in Russia.

The NRING Circuit is located in Bogorodsk, and is used for Russian national motor racing events.
