= Oka (river) =

River in western Russia

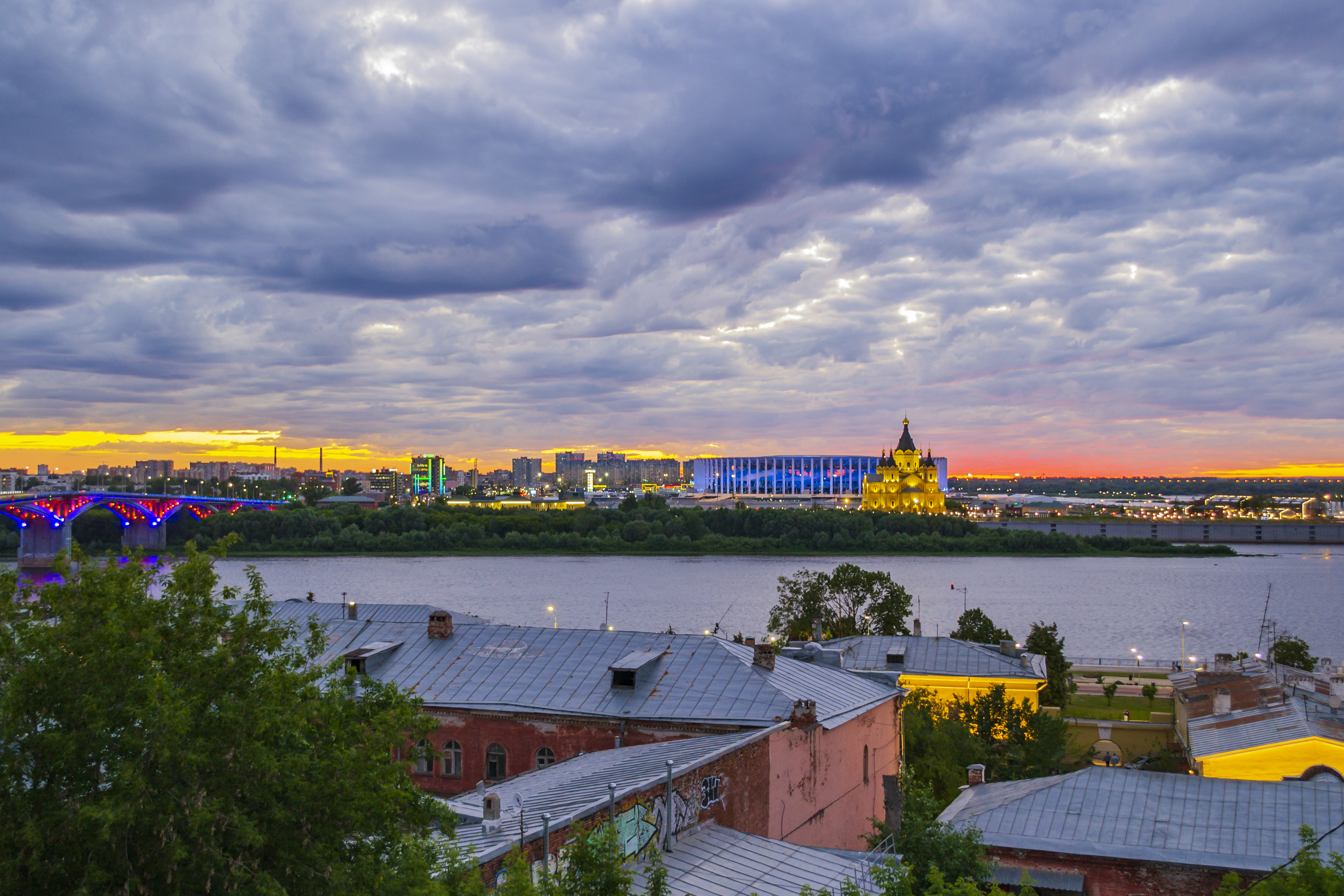
- The Oka riverbank in Nizhny Novgorod

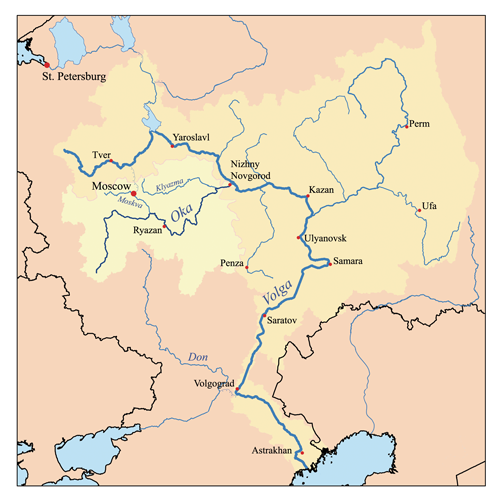
- Map of the Volga watershed with the Oka highlighted
- Native name: Ока (Russian)

Location
- Country: Russia
- Cities: Oryol, Kaluga, Serpukhov, Kolomna, Ryazan, Murom, Dzerzhinsk, Nizhny Novgorod

Physical characteristics
- Source
  - location: Oryol Oblast
  - coordinates: 52°21′45″N 36°13′20″E
  - elevation: 226 m (741 ft)
- Mouth: Volga
  - location: Nizhny Novgorod
  - coordinates: 56°19′55″N 43°58′53″E
  - elevation: 67 m (220 ft)
- Length: 1,500 km (930 mi)
- Basin size: 245,000 km^{2} (95,000 mi^{2}) 244,308.3 km^{2} (94,328.0 mi^{2})
- Discharge
  - location: Nizhny Novgorod (near mouth)
  - average: 1,260 m^{3}/s (44,000 cu ft/s) 1,327.15 m^{3}/s (46,868 cu ft/s)
- Discharge
  - location: Ryazan (Basin size: 97,995.8 km^{2} (37,836.4 sq mi)
  - average: 585.477 m^{3}/s (20,675.9 cu ft/s)
- Discharge
  - location: Kaluga (Basin size: 54,877.8 km^{2} (21,188.4 sq mi)
  - average: 305.042 m^{3}/s (10,772.5 cu ft/s)

Basin features
- Progression: Volga→ Caspian Sea
- Tributaries
  - left: Moskva, Klyazma
  - right: Moksha

The Oka (UK: /ˈɒkə/, US: /ˈoʊkə/; Russian: Ока IPA: [ɐˈka]) is a river in central Russia, the largest right tributary of the Volga. It flows through the regions of Oryol, Tula, Kaluga, Moscow, Ryazan, Vladimir and Nizhny Novgorod and is navigable over a large part of its total length, as far upstream as the town of Kaluga. Its length is 1,500 km (930 mi) and its catchment area 245,000 km^{2} (95,000 sq mi). The Russian capital Moscow sits on one of the Oka's tributaries—the Moskva, from which the capital's name is thought to be derived.

== Name and history ==
The Oka river was the homeland of the Eastern Slavic Vyatichi tribe. By the 5th century the land around the Oka river was inhabited by different Slavic tribes. The Baltic tribe of Galindians also lived in the western part of the Oka basin. Turkic tribes also inhabited the Oka area. The Oka river was also inhabited by Vikings and other peoples from Scandinavia. Artifacts of Scandinavian origin were found along the Oka–Volga route. There is no consensus opinion where the name Oka originated from. It could, however, be cognate with Sanskrit ओघ ogha, meaning 'stream' or 'current'.

From the Mongol conquest until about 1633, the Oka was the last line of defense against steppe raiders. Later Zasechnaya cherta, a chain of fortification lines, was created to protect Grand Duchy of Moscow and later the Tsardom of Russia from the Crimean-Nogai Raids. It was south of the original line along the Oka.

The river gave its name to the Upper Oka Principalities, situated upstream from Tarusa. In 1221 Grand Duke Yuri II of Vladimir founded Nizhny Novgorod, later to become one of largest Russian cities, to protect the Oka's confluence with the Volga. The Qasim Khanate, a Muslim polity, occupied the middle reaches of the Oka (around the city of Kasimov) in the 15th and 16th centuries.

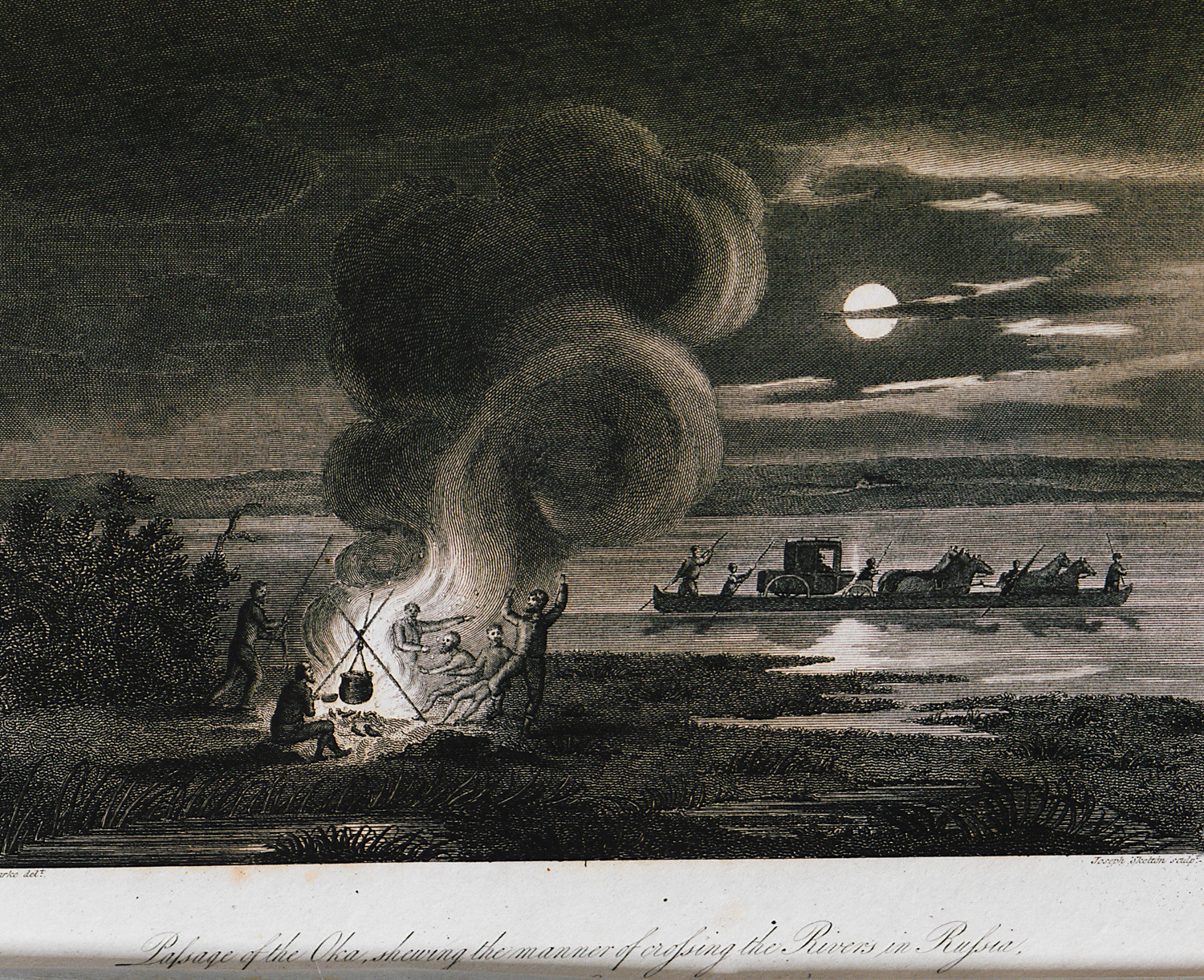
Crossing the Oka, 1810

Before the construction of the railways in the mid-19th century and the building of the Moscow Canal in the 1930s, the Oka, along with its tributary Moskva, served as an important transportation route connecting Moscow with the Volga. Due to the Oka's and Moskva's meandering courses, travel was not particularly fast: for example, it took Cornelis de Bruijn around 10 days to sail from Moscow down these two rivers to Nizhny Novgorod in 1703. Traveling upstream may have been even slower, as the boats had to be pulled by burlaks.

== Landmarks ==
The banks of the river are dotted with historical and cultural sites, including the medieval monasteries of Murom, the mosques and minarets of Kasimov, the fortified kremlins of Kolomna and Serpukhov, the memorial houses of Vasily Polenov and Sergey Yesenin, the excavated ruins of Old Ryazan and the Oka Shukhov Tower.

The Prioksko-Terrasny Biosphere Reserve lies along the left bank of the river opposite the town of Pushchino and is known for its wisent breeding nursery.

== In culture ==
The Oka appears as the title and main theme in a popular, nostalgia-filled military field song written by Leon Pasternak of the Polish 1st Tadeusz Kościuszko Infantry Division, which was founded near the river in 1943. The song compares the river to the Vistula river in Poland. The unit fought all the way to Berlin in subordination to the Red Army.

== Main tributaries ==
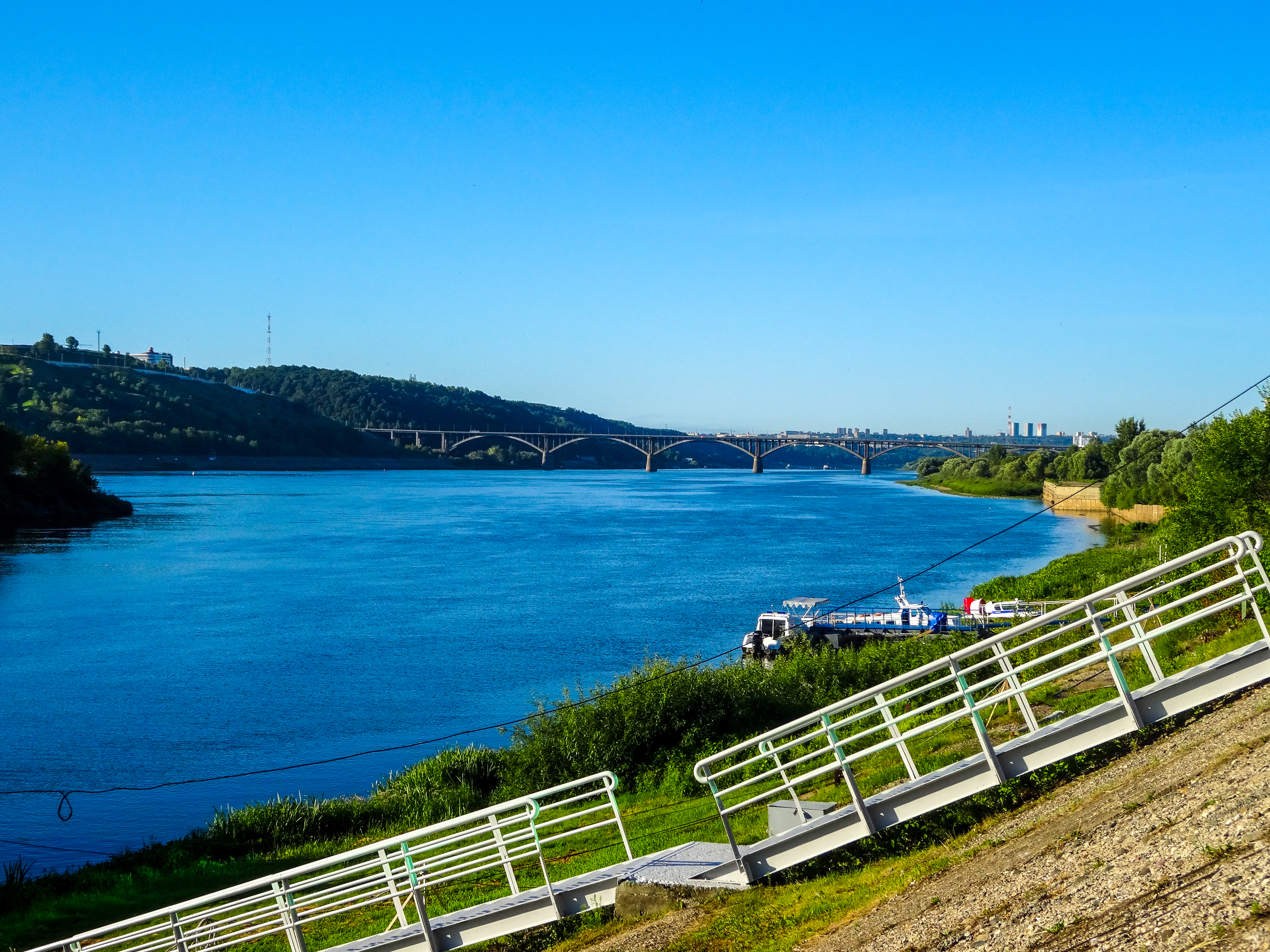
View to Molitovsky bridge from bank of Oka river. July 2014

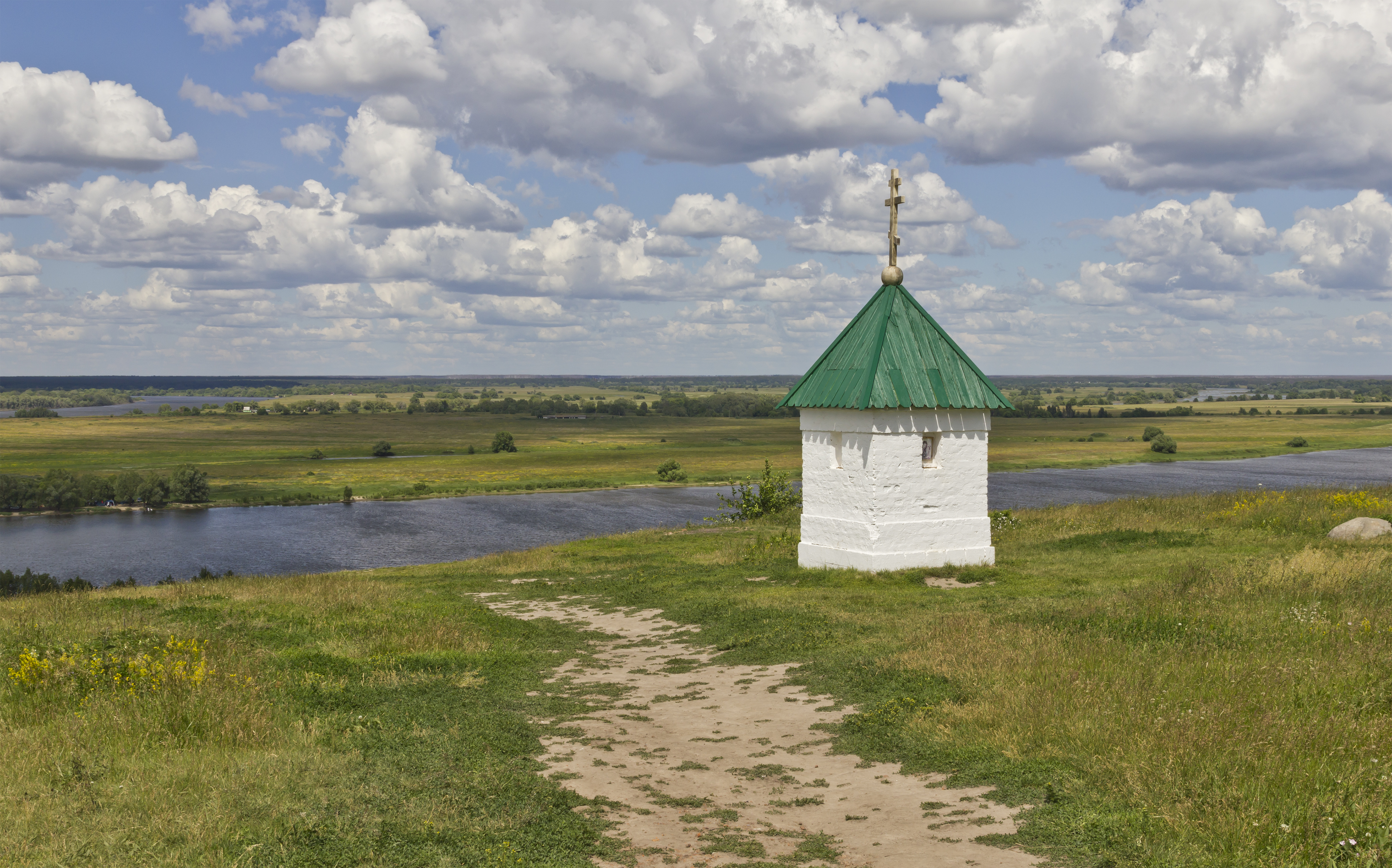
The Oka in Ryazan Oblast, near Rybnoye

The largest tributaries of the Oka are, from source to mouth:

- Zusha (right)
- Upa (right)
- Zhizdra (left)
- Ugra (left)
- Protva (left)
- Nara (left)
- Lopasnya (left)
- Besputa (right)
- Osyotr (right)
- Moskva (left)
- Vozha (right)
- Pronya (right)
- Para (right)
- Pra (left)
- Gus (left)
- Moksha (right)
- Tyosha (right)
- Ushna (left)
- Kishma (right)
- Klyazma (left)

== Cities on the Oka ==
Cities on the Oka
- Oryol
- Belyov
- Chekalin
- Kaluga
- Aleksin
- Tarusa
- Serpukhov
- Stupino
- Kashira
- Protvino
- Pushchino
- Kolomna
- Ryazan
- Kasimov
- Murom
- Pavlovo
- Navashino
- Gorbatov
- Dzerzhinsk
- Nizhny Novgorod
