= Navashino =

Town in Nizhny Novgorod Oblast, Russia

Navashino Навашино
- Town
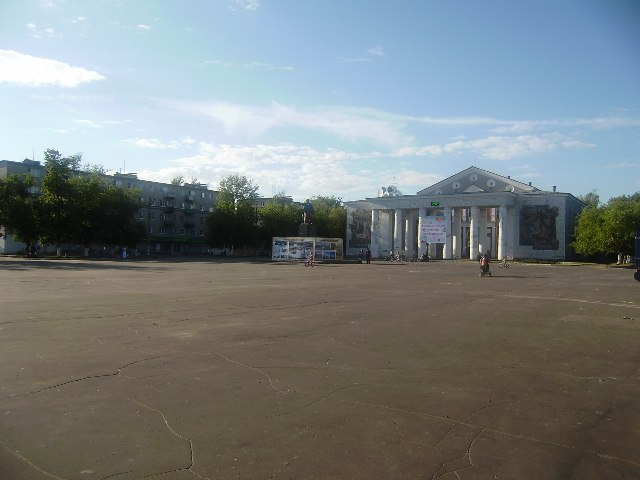
- Central square in Navashino

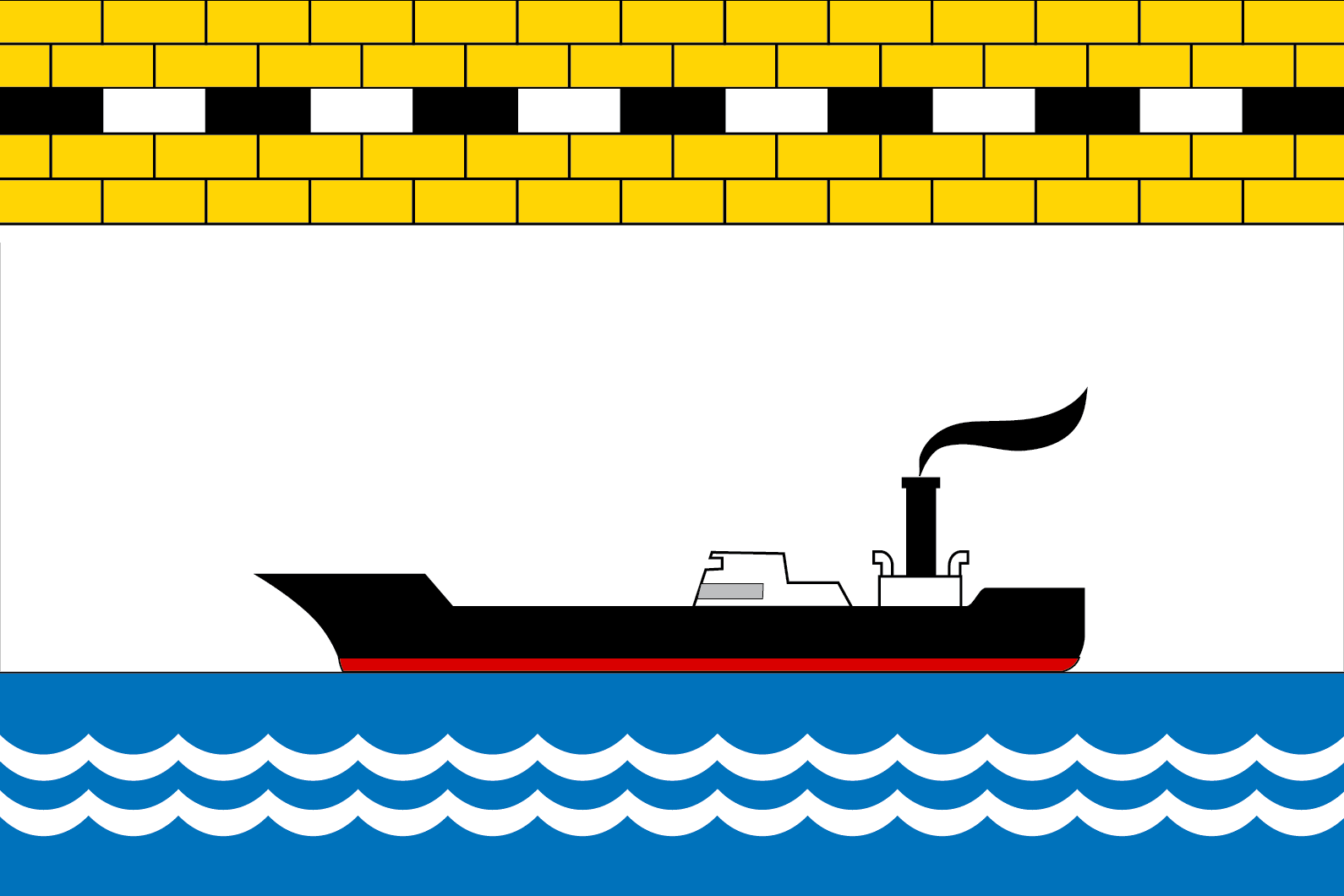
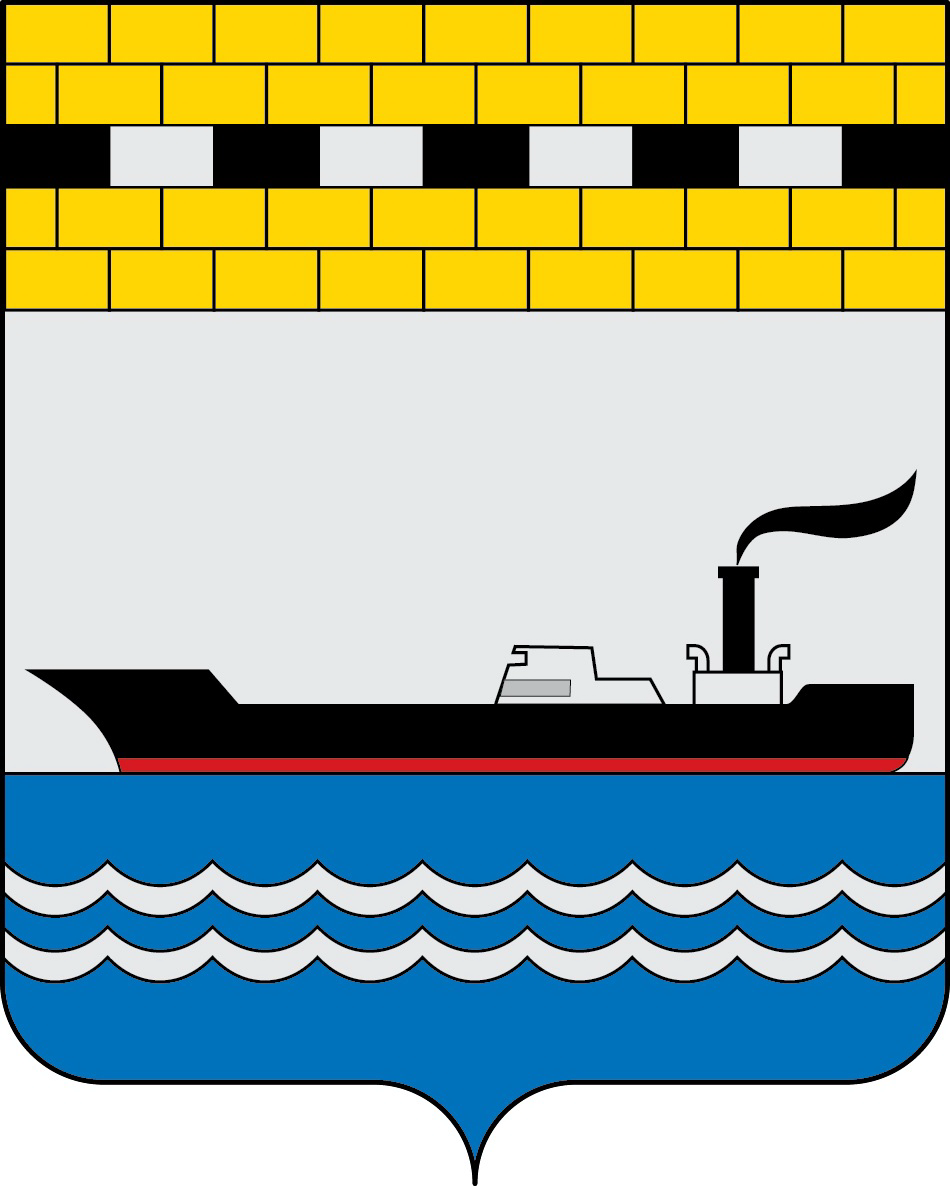
- Flag Coat of arms
- Interactive map of Navashino
- Location of Navashino Navashino (Nizhny Novgorod Oblast)
- Coordinates: 55°33′N 42°12′E
- Country: Russia
- Federal subject: Nizhny Novgorod Oblast
- Founded: 1957
- Town status since: 1957
- Elevation: 85 m (279 ft)

Population (2010 Census)
  - Total: 16,416
  - Estimate (2021): 14,664 (−10.7%)

Administrative status
  - Subordinated to: town of oblast significance of Navashino
  - Capital of: town of oblast significance of Navashino

Municipal status
  - Urban okrug: Navashinsky Urban Okrug
  - Capital of: Navashinsky Urban Okrug
- Time zone: UTC+3 (MSK)
- Postal code: 607100–607102
- OKTMO ID: 22730000001
- Website: navashino.omsu-nnov.ru?id=1133

Navashino population
- 2010 Census: 16,416
- 2002 Census: 17,810
- 1989 Census: 18,946
- 1979 Census: 17,490

Navashino (Russian: Нава́шино) is a town in Nizhny Novgorod Oblast, Russia, located on a branch of the Oka River, 10 km east of Murom and 158 kilometers (98 mi) southwest of Nizhny Novgorod. As of the 2010 Census, its population was 16,416.

== History ==
The town of Navashino was founded in 1957 by merging two neighboring settlements of Mordovshchikovo and Lipnya and named after the nearby railway station of Navashino. A railway was built in the area in 1912.

== Administrative and municipal status ==
Within the framework of administrative divisions, it is, together with fifty rural localities, incorporated as the town of oblast significance of Navashino—an administrative unit with the status equal to that of the districts. As a municipal division, the town of oblast significance of Navashino is incorporated as Navashinsky Urban Okrug.

Until May 2015, the town served as the administrative center of Navashinsky District and, within the framework of administrative divisions, was incorporated within that district as a town of district significance. As a municipal division, it was incorporated as Navashino Urban Settlement within Navashinsky Municipal District.

== Economy ==
OAO Okskaya Sudoverf is headquartered in Navashino. The shipbuilding company, originating from a local shipyard founded in 1907, builds boats for Volga and sea navigation. Some of their tankers are to be sold to customers as far afield as Malaysia's Petronas, which plans to use the vessels at its Caspian subsidiary.

=== Transportation ===
A new road bridge over the Oka River was opened in October 2009 near Navashino.
