= Pavlovsky District, Nizhny Novgorod Oblast =

Pavlovsky District Павловский район (Russian)
- District
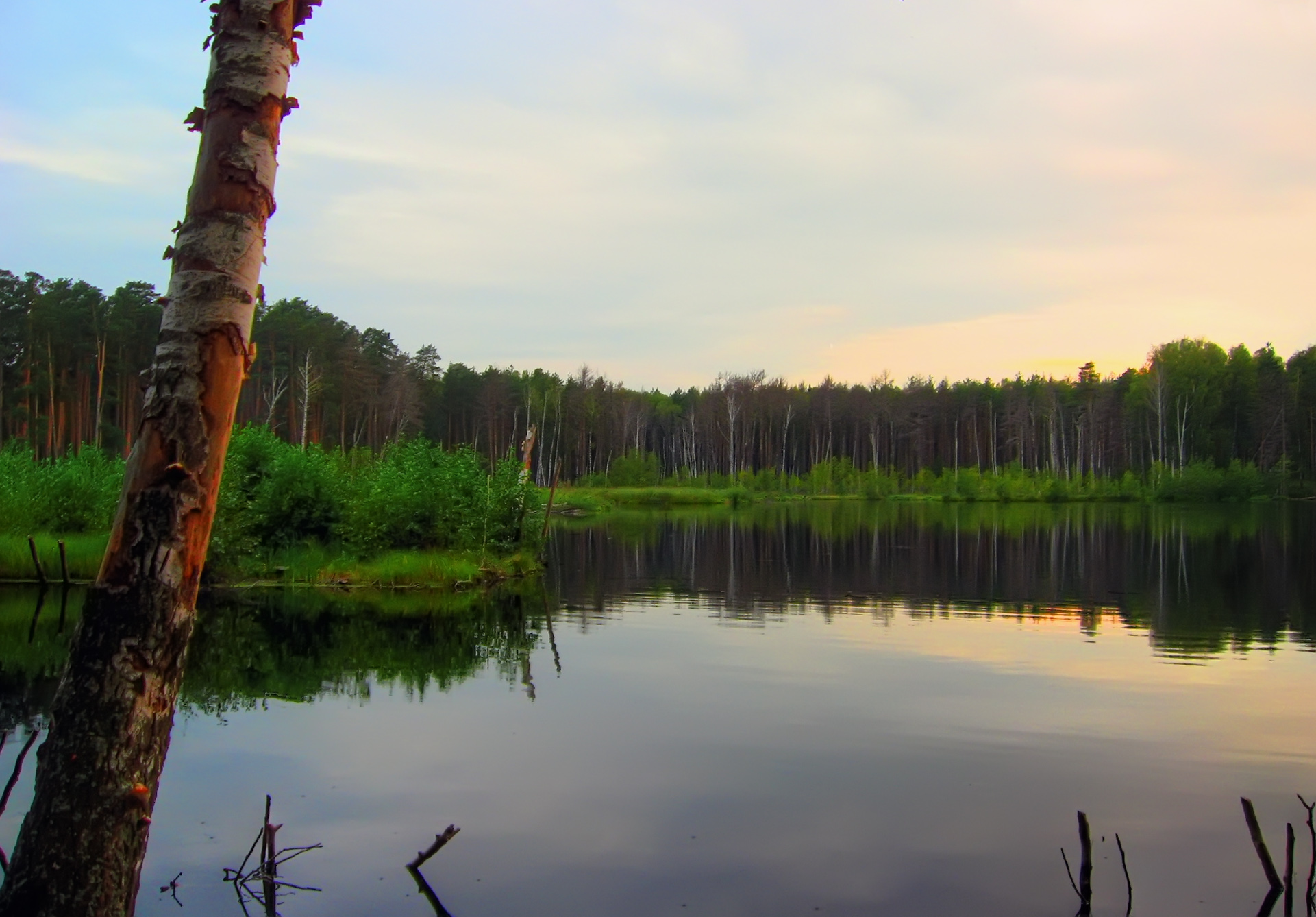
- Lake Tumbotinskoye in Pavlovsky District

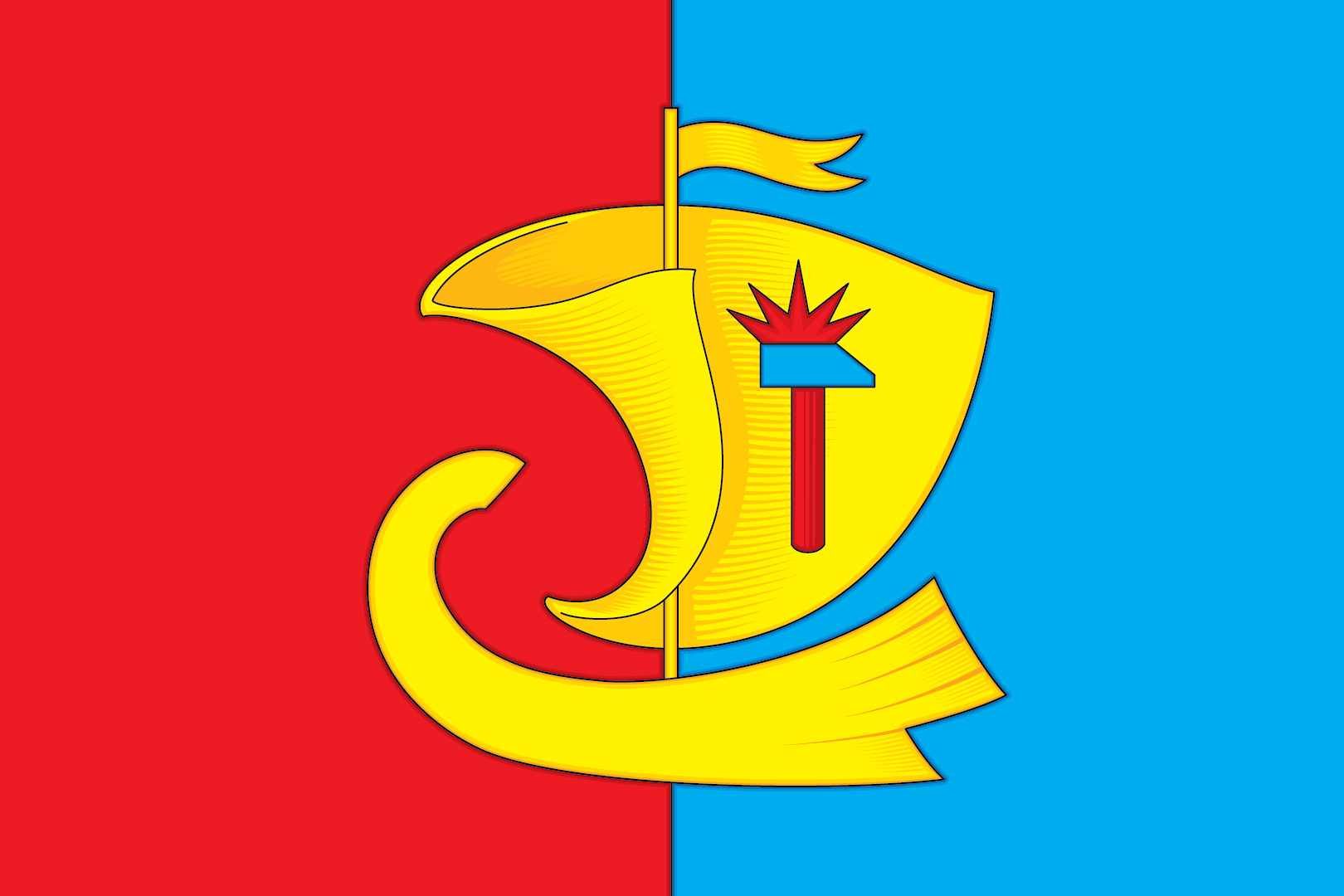
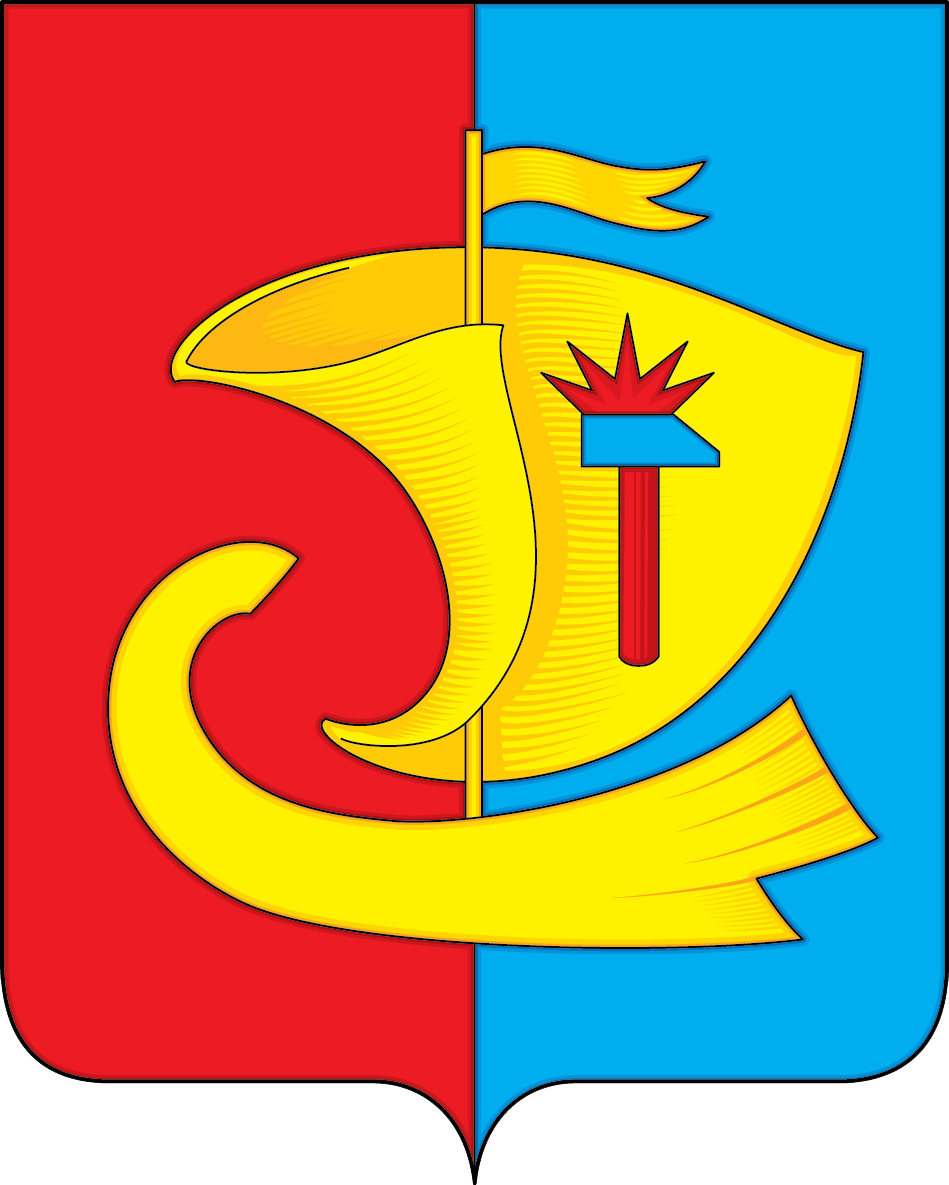
- Flag Coat of arms
- Location of Pavlovsky District in Nizhny Novgorod Oblast
- Coordinates: 55°57′43″N 43°05′24″E
- Country: Russia
- Federal subject: Nizhny Novgorod Oblast
- Established: 1929
- Administrative center: Pavlovo

Area
  - Total: 1,098.5 km^{2} (424.1 sq mi)

Population (2010 Census)
  - Total: 100,960
  - Density: 91.907/km^{2} (238.04/sq mi)
  - Urban: 81.1%
  - Rural: 18.9%

Administrative structure
  - Administrative divisions: 3 Towns of district significance, 1 Work settlements, 6 Selsoviets
  - Inhabited localities: 3 cities/towns, 1 urban-type settlements, 91 rural localities

Municipal structure
  - Municipally incorporated as: Pavlovsky Municipal District
  - Municipal divisions: 4 urban settlements, 6 rural settlements
- Time zone: UTC+3 (MSK)
- OKTMO ID: 22642000
- Website: http://admpavlovo.ru

Pavlovsky District (Russian: Па́вловский райо́н) is an administrative district (raion), one of the forty in Nizhny Novgorod Oblast, Russia. Municipally, it is incorporated as Pavlovsky Municipal District. It is located in the west of the oblast. The area of the district is 1,098.5 square kilometers (424.1 sq mi). Its administrative center is the town of Pavlovo. Population: 100,960 (2010 Census); 43,426 (2002 census); 47,875 (1989 Soviet census). The population of Pavlovo accounts for 60.1% of the district's total population.

== History ==
The district was established in 1929.

== Notable residents ==
- Nikolai Albov (1866–1897), botanist and geographer, born in Pavlovo
- Yelizaveta Yermolayeva (born 1930), Soviet runner
