= Ardatov, Nizhny Novgorod Oblast =

Ardatov Ардатов
- town (Note: In Russian is used the term rabochy possiolok (Russian: рабочий посёлок), what can be literally translated like "work settlement" (or "workers' settlement") which is used in some cases for describing an urban settlement having about 5,000—20,000 inhabitants. However, the English term town may be closer for describing it. This is why, the word town is used in this article.)
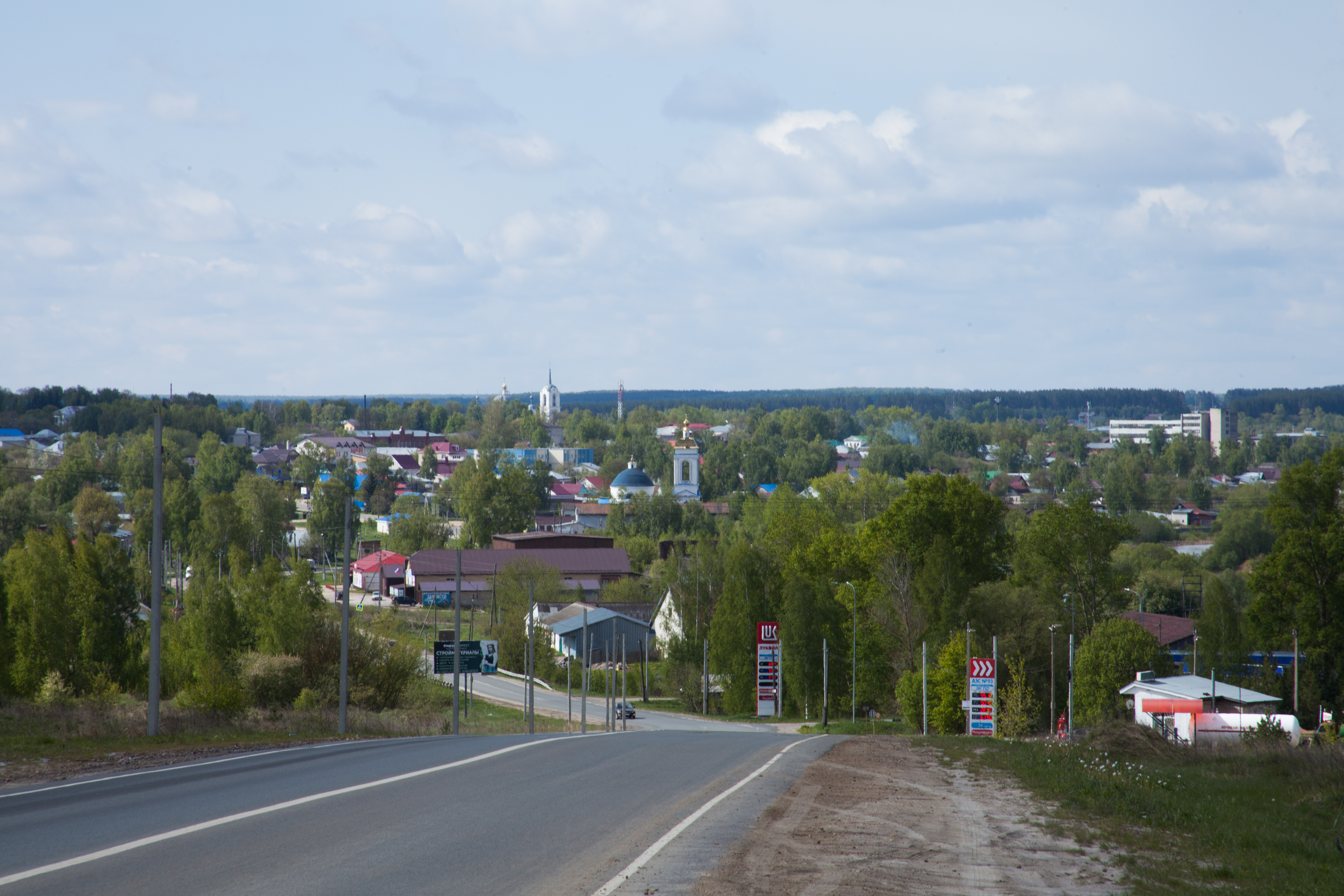
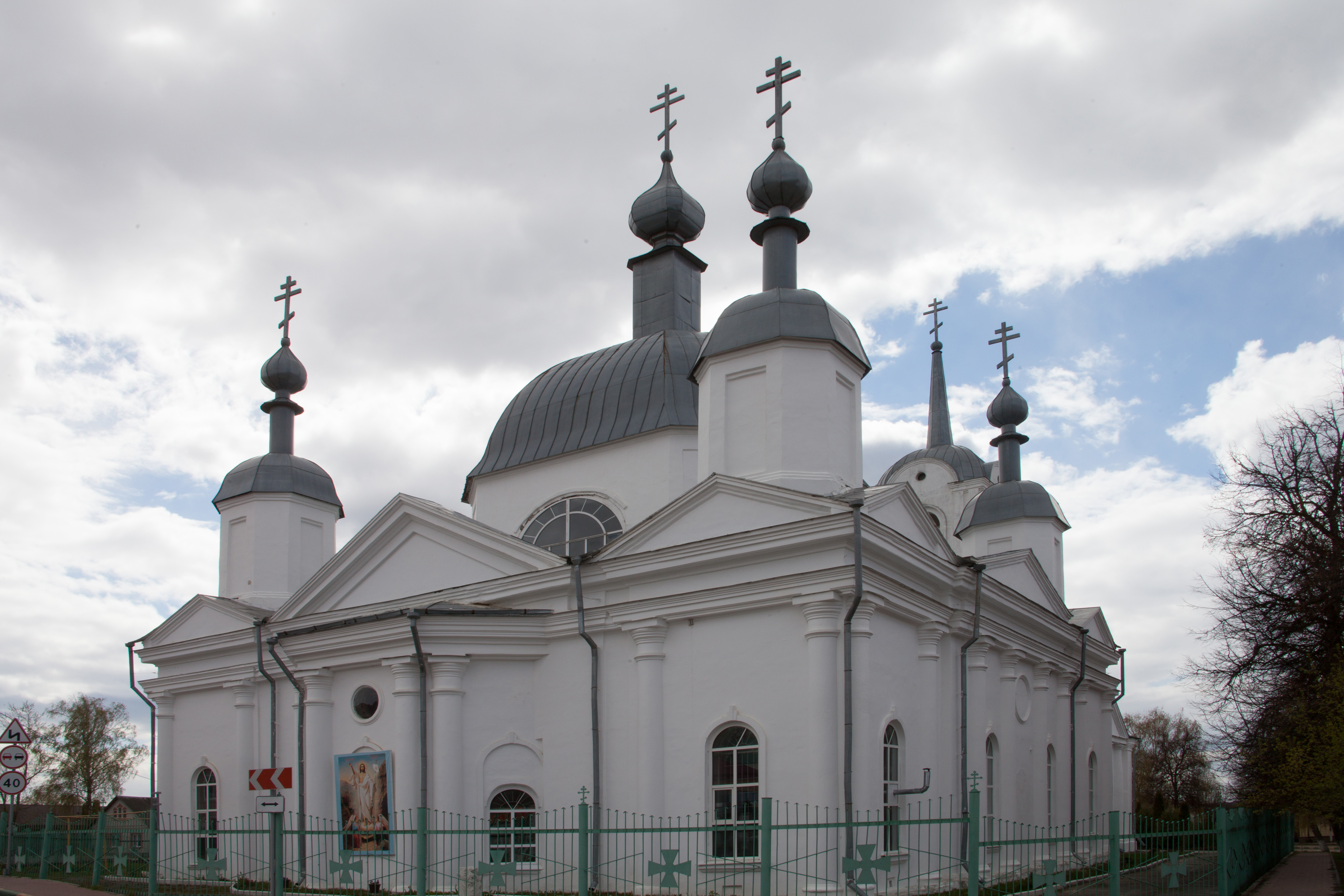
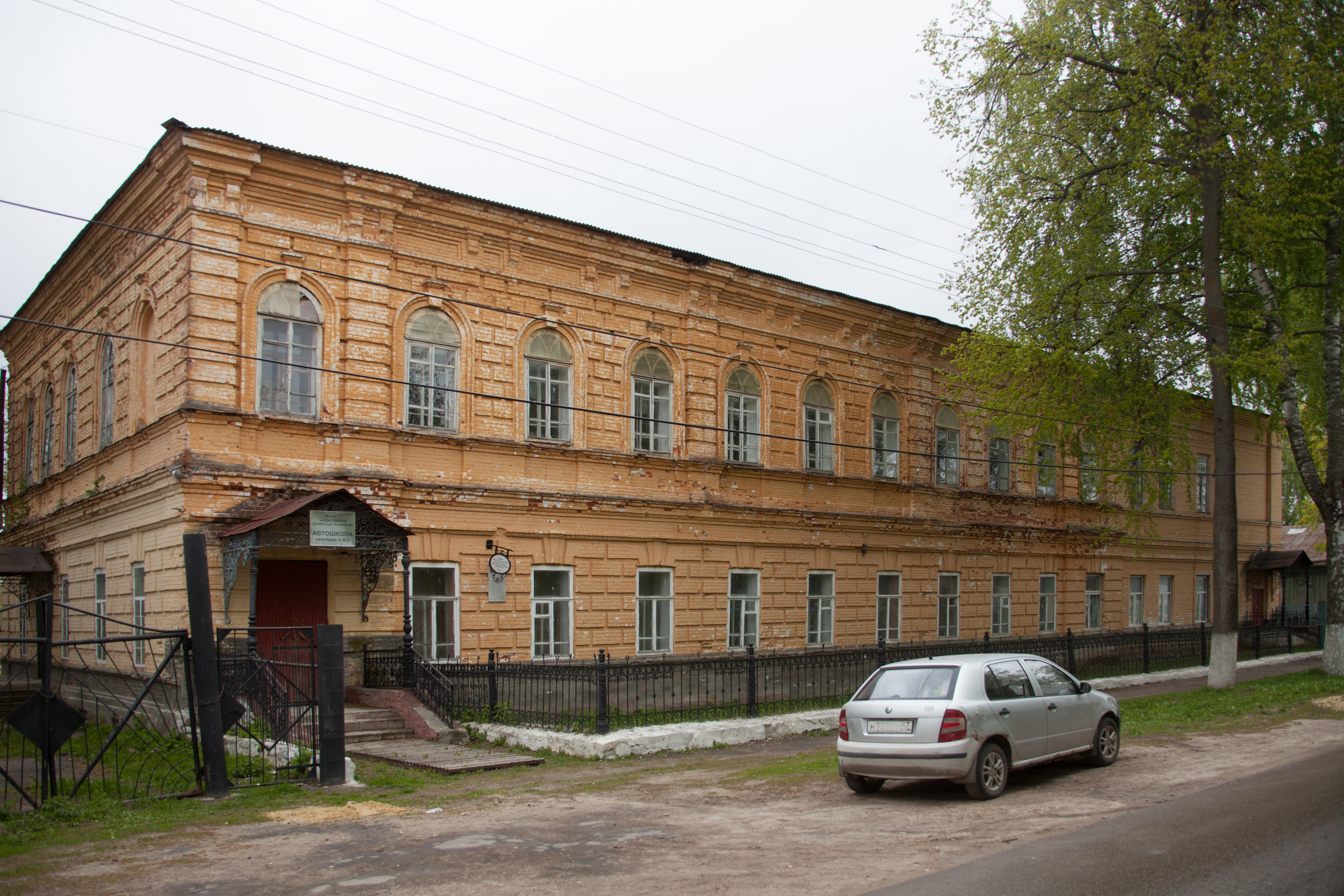
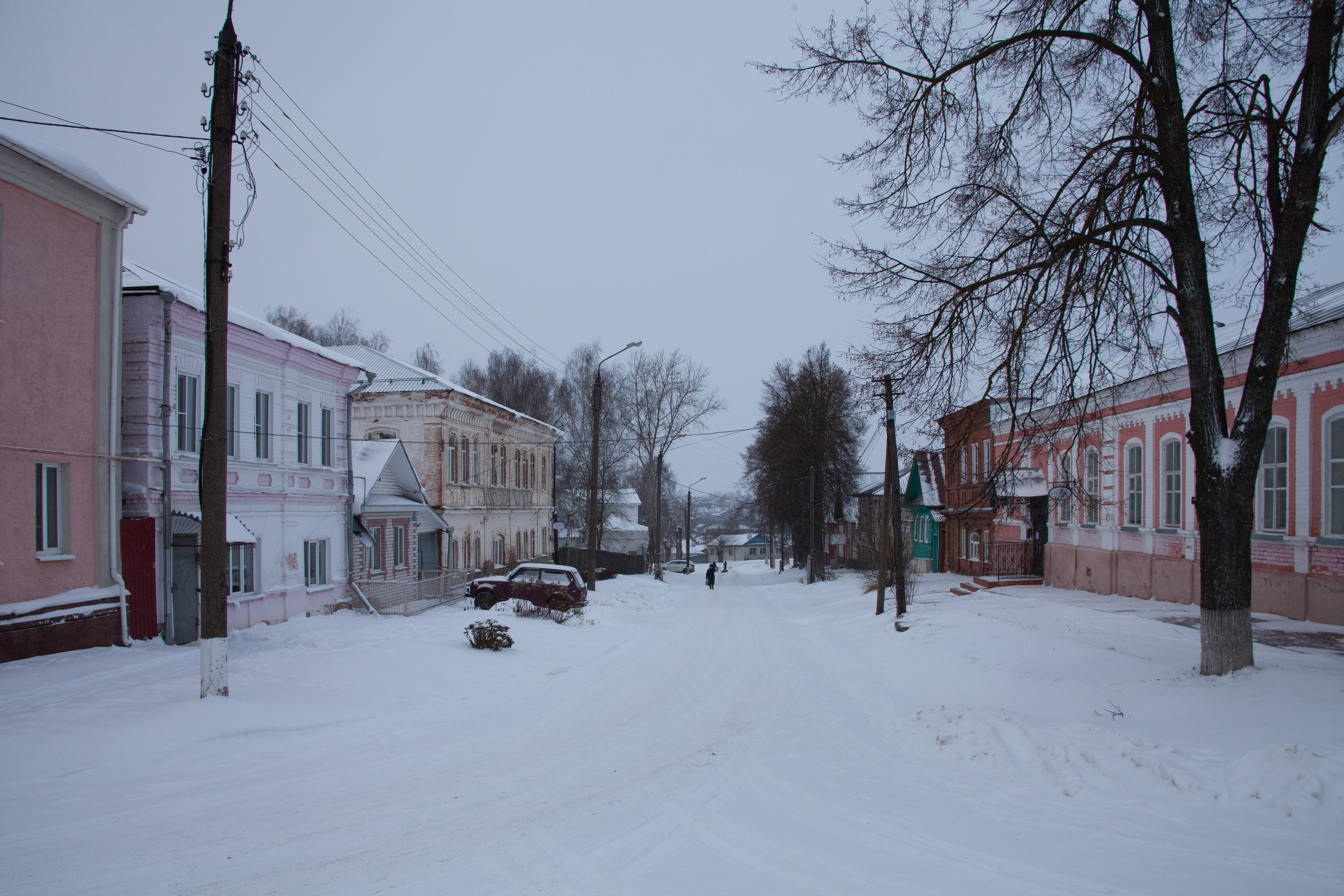
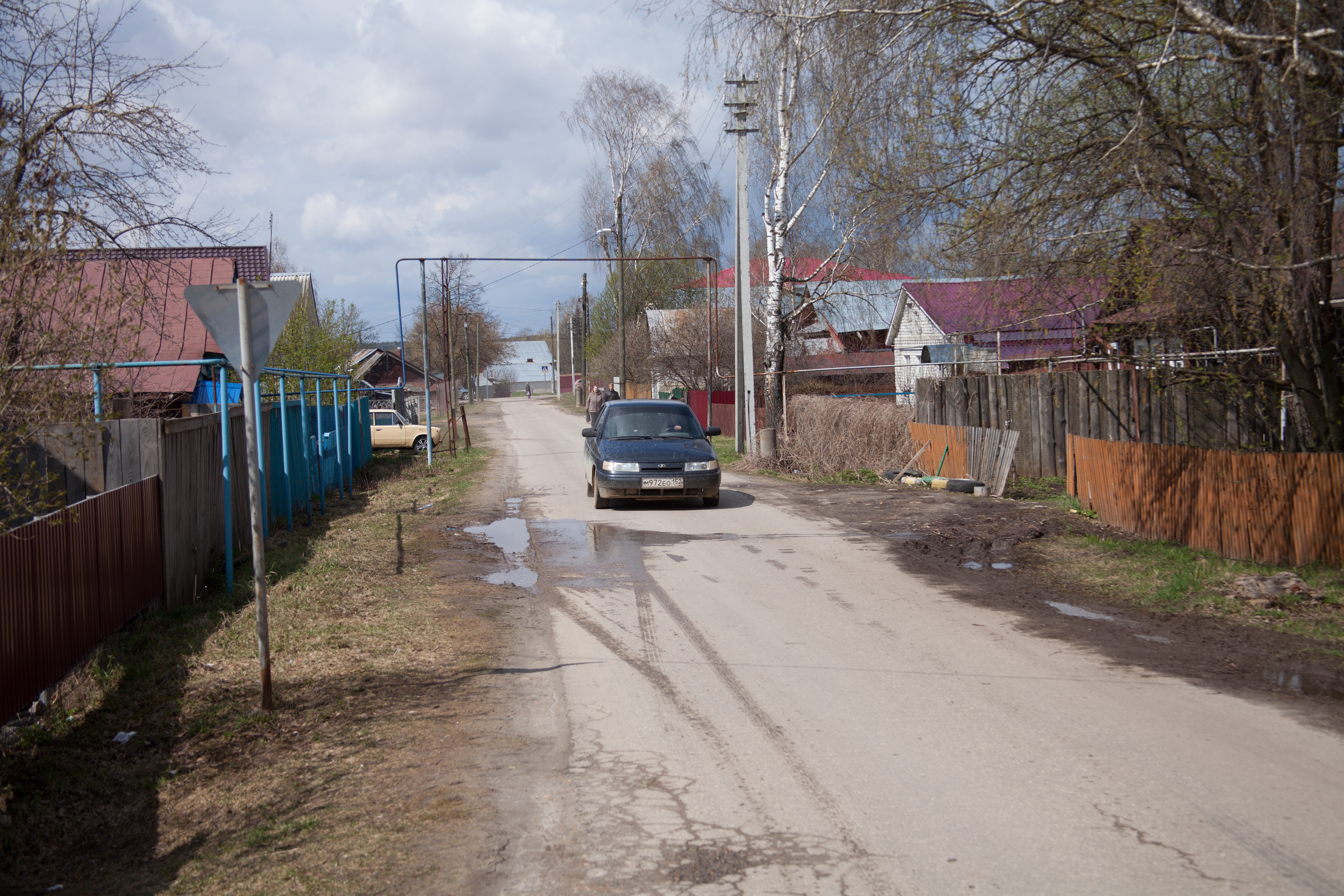
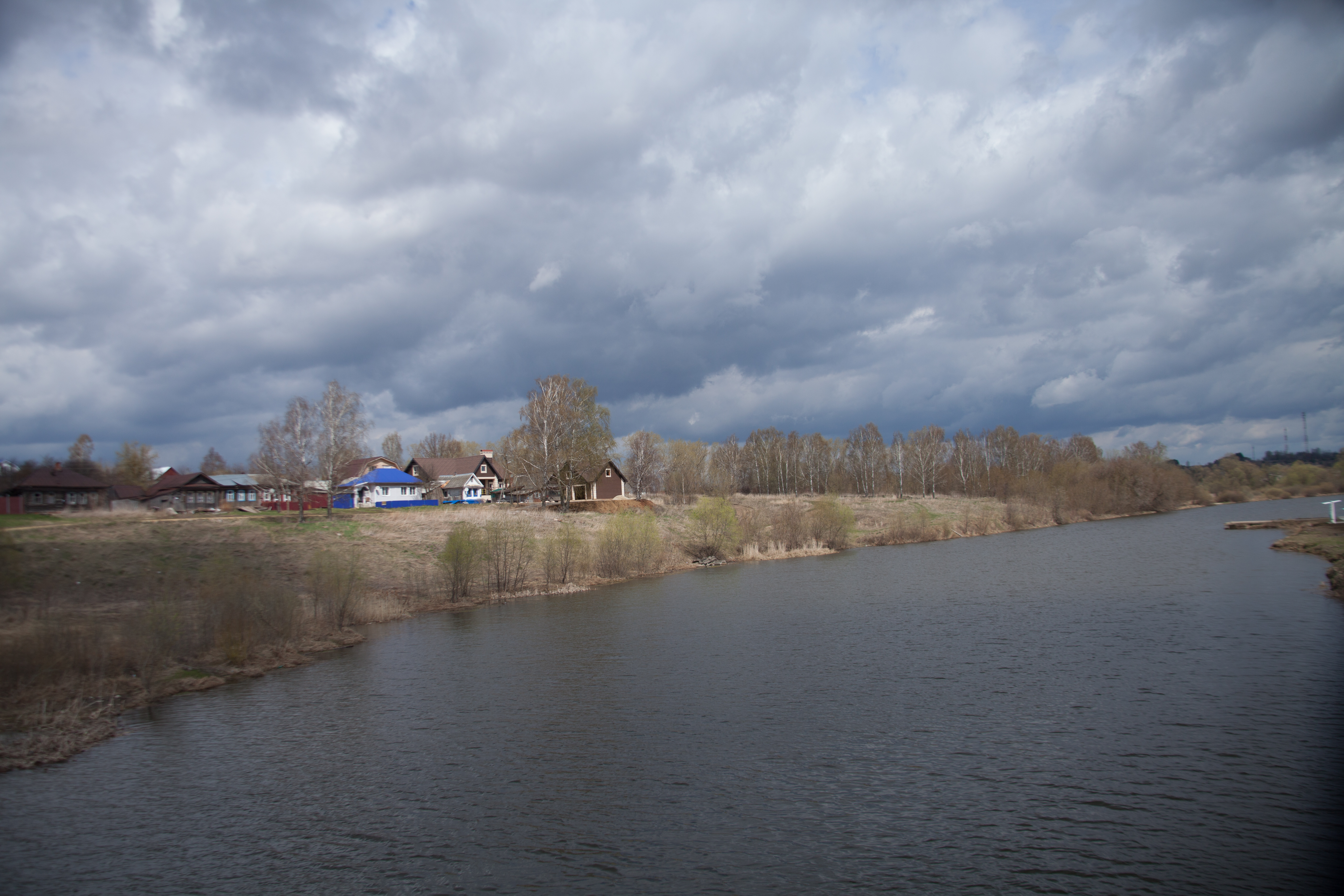
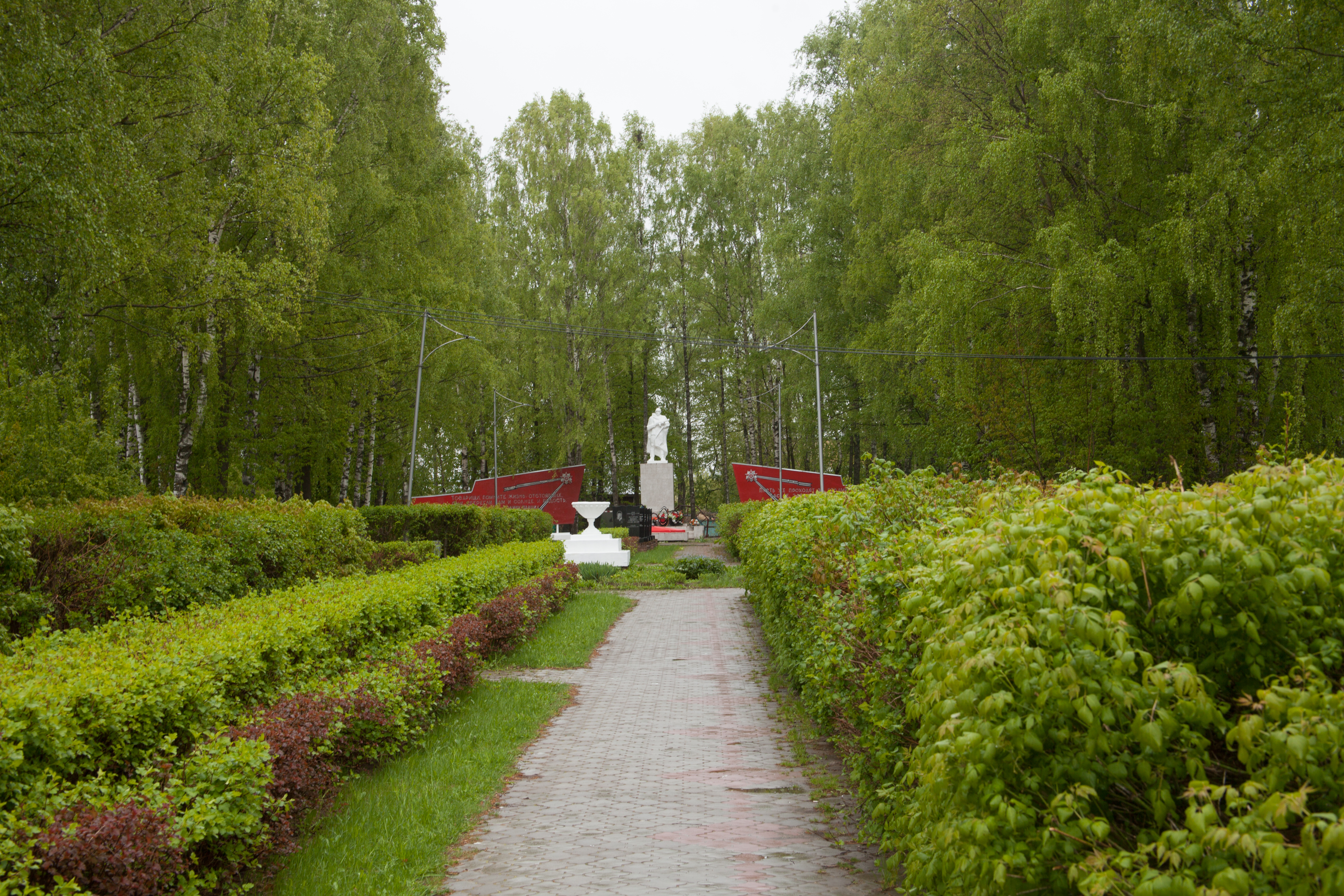
- Left to right, top to bottom: Panorama; Cathedral • Former zemstvo administration Downtown street • Peripherical street Lemet River • Park

- Coat of arms
- Interactive map of Ardatov
- Location of Ardatov Ardatov (Nizhny Novgorod Oblast)
- Coordinates: 55°14′19″N 43°05′47″E
- Country: Russia
- Federal subject: Nizhny Novgorod Oblast
- Administrative district: Ardatov District
- Founded: 1552 (Julian)
- Elevation: 155 m (509 ft)

Population
  - Estimate (2022): 9,768 )
- Time zone: UTC+3 (MSK)
- Postal code: 607130
- OKTMO ID: 22602151051

Ardatov (Russian: Ардатов; Russian pronunciation: [ɐr'datəf]; before 1779 and between 1925 and 1959 Ardatovo, Russian: Ардатово) is an urban locality (a work settlement) in the Nizhny Novgorod Oblast, Russia. It is the administrative center of the Ardatov District. It is located 165 kilometres (103 mi) southwest of Nizhny Novgorod and 430 kilometers east of Moscow. The nearest railway station, Mukhtolovo, is about 28.5 kilometres (17.7 mi) to the north.

Ardatov stands on the site of a presumed Bulgar camp settlement that existed since the 13th century, and later a Golden Horde fortified settlement. After the territory was annexed to Russia in 1552, it became a yasak village (first mentioned in 1578). The population was initially mixed Russian-Mordovian, and by the end of the 17th to the beginning of the 18th century, it became completely Russian. From 1779 to 1923, it was a uyezd town, from 1925 it became a village, from 1929 it served as a district center, and since 1959 it has been a town. As of 2022, the population of Ardatov was 9,768 people.

Until the mid-20th century, agriculture formed the basis of the economy, and later there was a trend towards a greater role for industry. The town has two technical schools, two secondary schools, four kindergartens, a cultural centre, two libraries, a local history museum, a children's art school, and a hospital, as well as a sport and recreation center. Since 1930, a district newspaper has been published.

Until the early 20th century, Ardatov had significant religious importance, housing the Pokrovsky Nunnery, three churches, and several chapels. All of them were closed during the Soviet era. Since 1990, the restoration of some churches and the construction of new ones began, and since 2012, the town has is of the Ardatov Deanery of the Vyksa Diocese of the Russian Orthodox Church. However, as of 2024, the territory of the former monastery is occupied by a women's correctional colony. Ardatov does not have significant tourist potential, but over 20 sites are regional architectural monuments, and its central part has been officially recognised as a protected area.

== Etymology ==
There are several hypotheses of the etymology of the toponym "Ardatov":

According to the most widespread one, the name is connected with the legend about the Mordovian guide Ardatka, who led Ivan the Terrible's troops through the deep forests of this area and was granted land for his assistance. No reliable information about Ardatka has been found, but a Mordovian pre-Christian name "Ardat" or "Ordat" indeed existed. According to local historian Alexander Bazayev, the story about Ardatka appeared only in the 19th century, as there is a similar story about the founder of the Mordovian town of Ardatov. Bazayev suggested that the tale about the legendary guide was brought from one Ardatov to the other by Temnikov merchants.

Another hypothesis was expressed by the local historian N. Artyomov. In his opinion, the word consists of two Erzyan roots: orta — "gate", and tov — "there", hence the name could be roughly translated as "gate beyond the border", i. e. "to the Russian state". A similar version was held by the local historian Leonid Kapterev, who believed that the toponym comes from the Mordovian words arda — "go" and tov — "there".

Another version was proposed by historian A. Orlov, who suggested the existence of a Tatar settlement at this place, the name of which could be translated as "the mountain of the Horde" or "the middle mountain". The local historian Alexander Bazayev supplemented this hypothesis — in his opinion, the village on the site of the present day Ardatov could have been the first settlement after crossing the border between Russian and the Golden Horde, which passed in the 16th century along the course of the Tyosha River — accordingly, for the Russians it was an "Ordatova" (i. e., "Horde") village.

Researchers Nikolay Morokhin and Alexey Arzamasov cite another version of the toponym origin from the Indo-European root ard - "to flow", "to make way towards". However, in their opinion, this version looks unconvincing, because in this case there should have been a hydronym with this name in the neighbourhood, which is not the case.

== History ==
=== Prehistory ===
According to archaeological data, 5—6 thousand years ago the Ardatov region was inhabited by Neolithic tribes belonging to the Lyalovo culture. In the Ardatov Municipal District have been discovered a total of 61 archaeological sites of the Neolithic era — most of them are located in the course of the Tyosha River. The biggest number of such sites a located around the present-day villages of Lichadeyevo (9) and Sakony (7) and near the settlement of Krasnaya Rechka (9). These primitive inhabitants were hunters and gatherers, well favoured by the local natural conditions — a large number of forests with animals, birds and various natural gifts and a large number of rivers with fish. In 1929, scientific excavations were carried out near Sakony, revealing stone arrowheads, scrapers, cleavers, chisels and a large number of animal and fish bones. In the 3rd—2nd millennia B. C. the ancient inhabitants of the Ardatov region learnt to produce metals — first bronze and then iron. This allowed them to pass gradually to sedentary lifestyle, engaging in cattle breeding and farming.

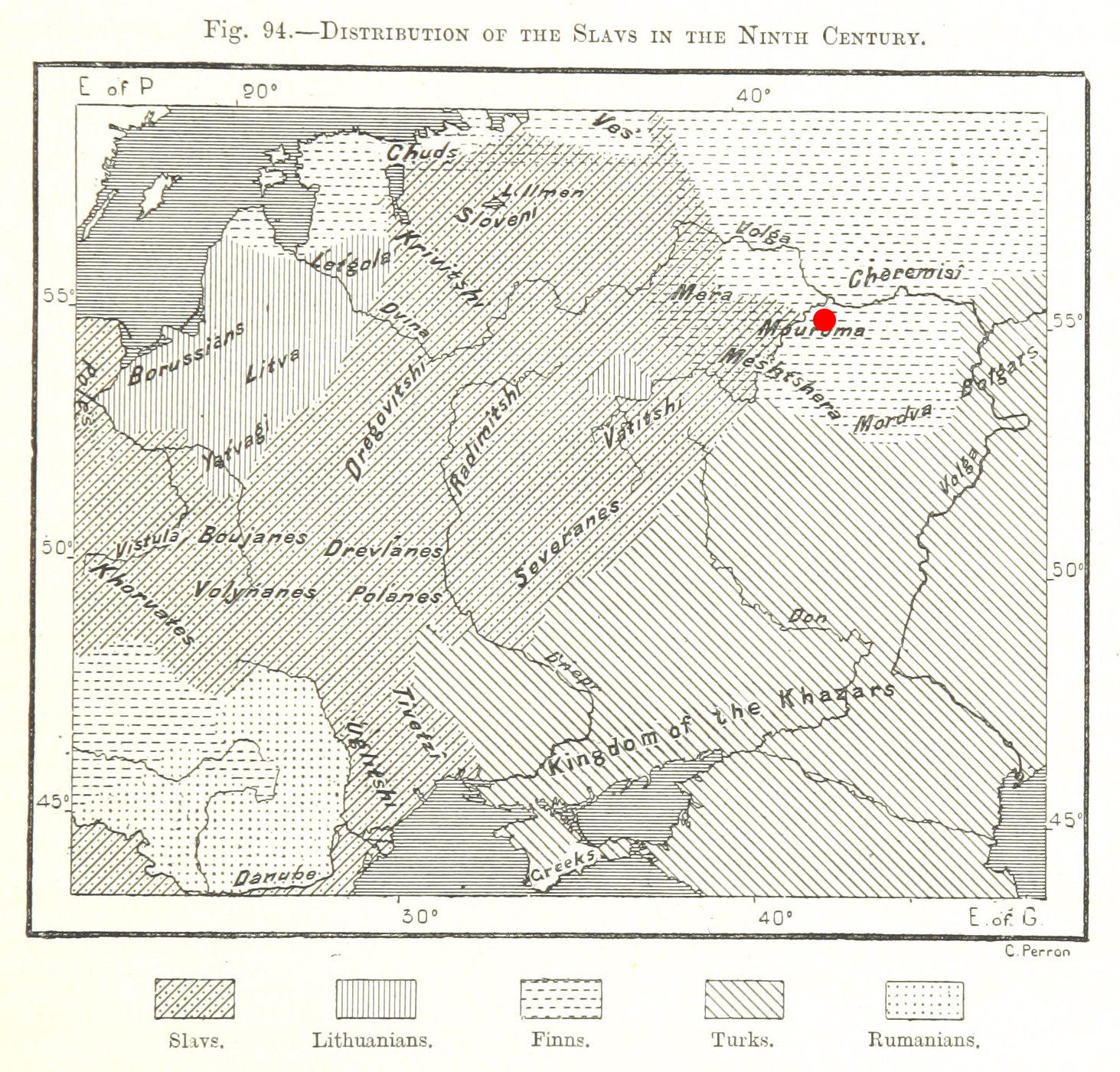
Distribution of the Slavs in the 9th century. The site of present-day Ardatov is marked with a red dot.

From the 2nd century A. D. Finno-Ugric people reached the zone – primarily Mordovian tribes, among which the most numerous were the Erzya, as well as the Moksha, Burtas and Teryukhans. The Finno-Ugrians were able to smelt metals, first of all bronze, from which they made numerous jewellery and household items, which are now found during archaeological excavations. They also travelled along rivers on ships, so most of their settlements (some of which have survived) are located in river valleys. Among local toponyms there are a large number of names of Finno-Ugric origin. Nomadic peoples, such as the Kipchaks and Khazars, joined from south-west to the territory of present-day Ardatov too. Traces of their presence are still visible, i. e. 2 kilometres (1.2 mi) away from Ardatov, on the bank of the Pashin ravine the rests of a Kipchak burial mound, the grave of a noble herdsman is still visible. The mound has impressive dimensions, it is 17 metres (56 ft) in length, 7 metres (23 ft) in width and 3 metres (9.8 ft) in height. The first permanent settlement on the site of Ardatov, Imimshikelle, was founded at the same time by the Kipchaks or Majars; later this site transformed to the Russian village of Totorshevo, now part of Ardatov.

From the 9th or 10th century, the region came under the influence of the Turkics people, which inhabited the Volga Bulgaria. Under this people, trade flourished in the Ardatov area, a trade route connecting their country to Russia was laid, this route existed at least until the 13th century. A Bulgar customs house was established in the neighbourhood of the present-day village of Sakony.

In the 12th century, Slavic settlers appeared in the lower reaches of the Oka River, gradually assimilating some local tribes (for example, the Muromia tribe, which adopted the language and culture of the newcomers). Other tribes retained their language and culture, continued to engage in hunting and beekeeping, but learned agriculture from the Slavs, adopting agronomic technologies which could be considered relatively progressive for that time. The Mordvins learned to produce or acquired some tools and ornaments from the Slavs — for instance, in the Second Kuzhendeyevo burial site (a couple of kilometers/miles south of Ardatov), dating from the late 12th to early 13th centuries, a socketed broad-bladed axe, ornaments with a grain-like pattern, and carnelian beads of evidently Slavic production were found. Colonization mainly occurred peacefully, although there are known instances of resistance from the Mordvins against the newcomers — for example, in the early 13th century, a bloody war broke out between the Erzya ruler Purgaz and Russian princes who invaded his lands. Purgaz even besieged the Russian city of Nizhny Novgorod, founded in 1221, burning posad, but was forced to retreat "across the Char River" (modern-day Chara).

In 1236–1237, Nizhny Novgorod and Volga Bulgaria were destroyed by new conquerors — the Mongols, who included these lands in their state, the Golden Horde. Gradually, Nizhny Novgorod was rebuilt, and in 1341 it became the center of a principality, which became for several centuries the eastern outpost of the Russian lands. However, the present-day Ardatov district and the future town itself, continued to be part of the Golden Horde. The border between the two states ran about 17 kilometres (11 mi) north-ward from the present-day Ardatov, along the course of the Tyosha River. Around the mid-13th century, a Bulgar camp ground was founded on the left bank of the Lemet River (northern part of present-day Ardatov). By the end of the 13th century the Golden Horde authorities built a fortified settlement on its place, which became the centre for collecting yasak from the surrounding Mordovian tribes.

At that time, the area of modern Ardatov was sparsely populated due to constant border conflicts between the strengthening Moscow principality and the weakening Golden Horde. The peak of these confrontations came with several military campaigns undertaken in the mid-16th century by Tsar Ivan the Terrible against the Golden Horde. After two failures, his third campaign in 1552 ended in victory over the weakened Tatar state and the annexation of its lands to Russia.

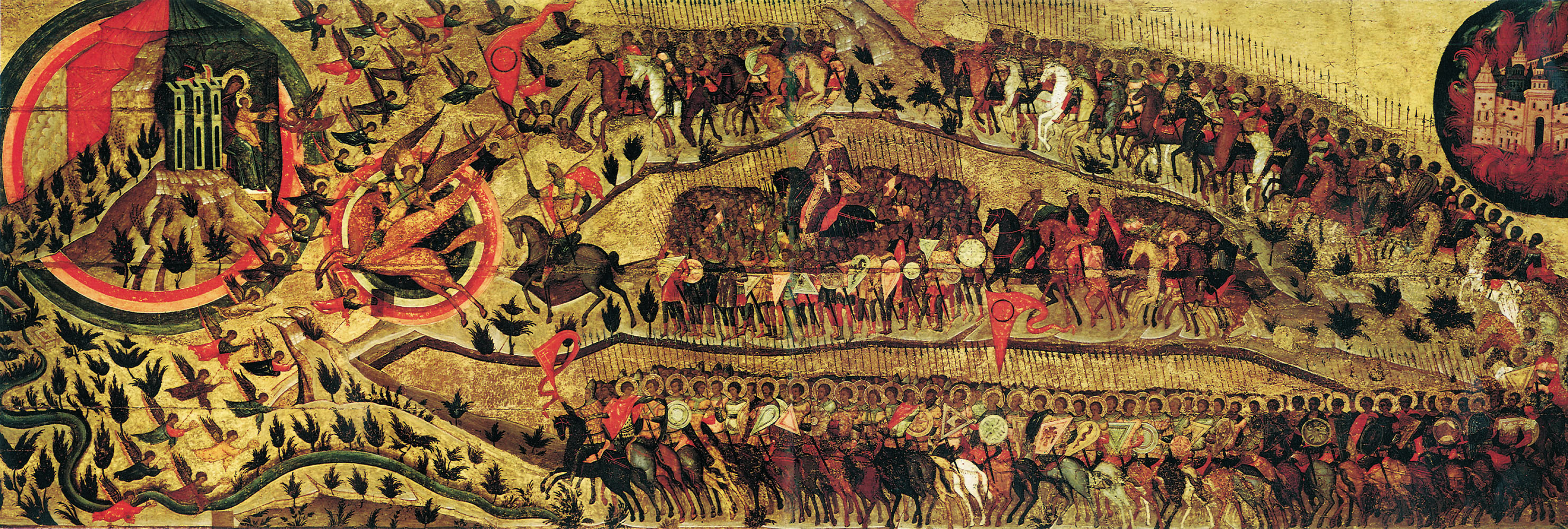
Russian Orthodox icon Blessed Be the Host of the King of Heaven commemorating the conquest of Kazan

=== Russian village ===
Ivan the Terrible's campaign is connected with an undocumented legend about the Mordovian guide Ardatka and his brothers, who helped the tsar's army to find the way to the Golden Horde's capital city of Kazan in the dense forests around nowadays Ardatov. According to the legend, for his faithful service Ardatka was rewarded with lands, on which he founded a settlement. There are no documentary confirmations of Ardatka's receipt of lands, but the story generally fits into the picture of that time, as Ivan the Terrible actively distributed the conquered lands in fiefdoms to servants. Thus, property in these regions was given to the princes Golitsyns, Odoyevskys, Volkonskys, Romodanovskys, Bludovs, boyars Morozovs, Tatar murzas Moksheyevs and Tarbedeyevs. At the same time, unlike most of the neighbouring villages, which were estates and fiefdoms of Russian service class people, there are no such facts about Ardatov, which always remained a governmental property.

The legend is widely spread in the area, and this is why local historians prefer to consider the date of Ardatov's foundation as 1552 — the year of Ivan the Terrible's campaign against Kazan. However, first document mentioning Ardatov under the name "Ordatova village" is not far from that date, as it can be found in the Arzamas estate deeds for 1578. The document says that village was a mixed Russian-Mordovian one, while the Tatars mostly left these lands after their annexation by Russia.

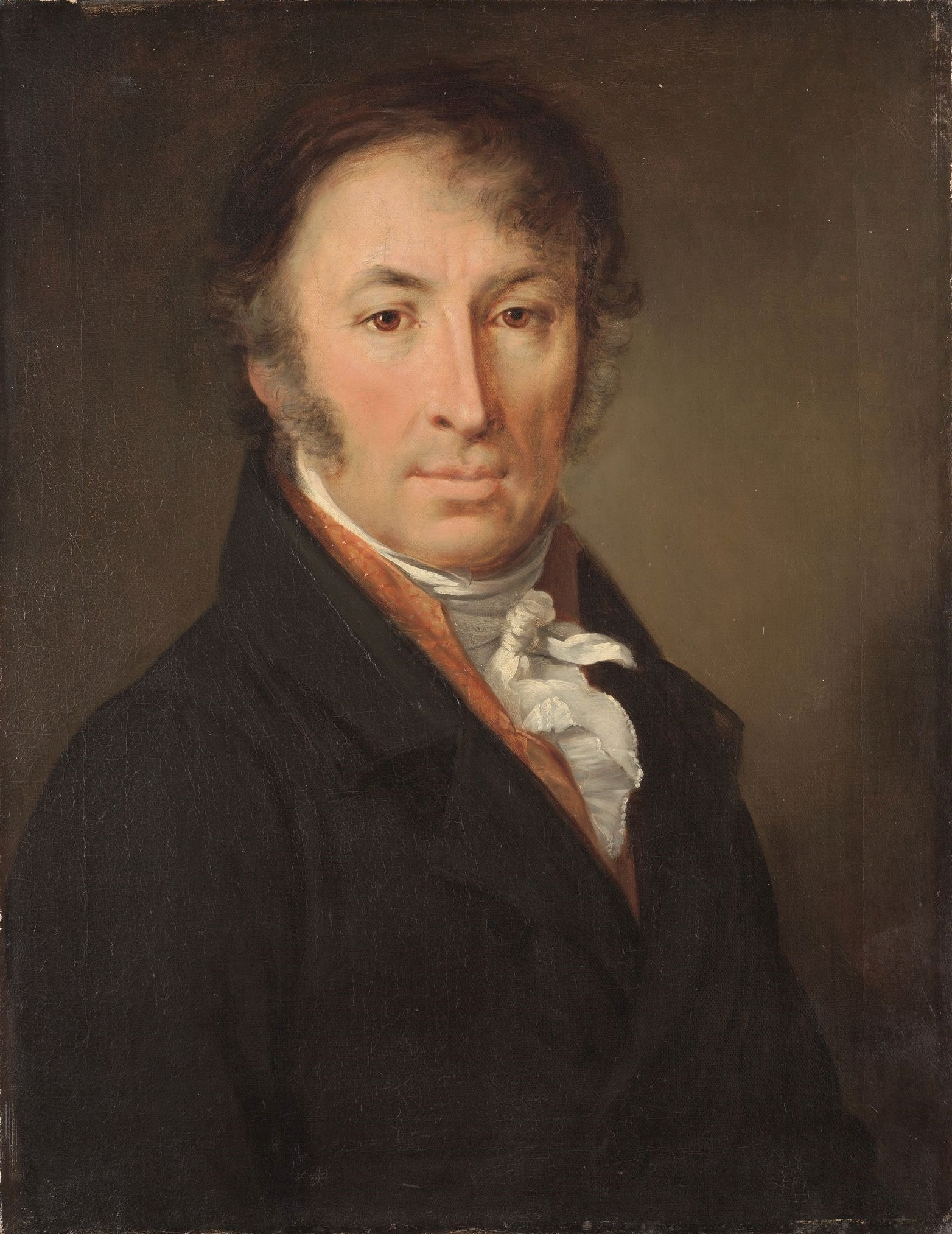
Nikolay Mikhaylovich Karamzin, a landlord of Ardatov uyezd

The hostilities of the Time of Troubles in the early 17th century seem to have had little impact on the Ardatov area — although there were clashes in the neighbouring cities of Murom and Arzamas, there are no records of battles near the village of Ardatovo. At the same time, Ardatovo was among those Russian lands that refused to swear an oath to Tsar Vasily Shuisky. Historian and politician Nikolay Mikhaylovich Karamzin (1766—1826), an estate owner in the Ardatov uyezd himself, cited in his book History of the Russian State (1816—1826) a document of the epoch:

... Orzamas and Olatyr... and with the districts were in treason, from Tsar Vasily laid aside...

In two decisive battles, held on 11 January [O.S. 1] and 20 March [O.S. 10 March] 1610, the rebels were defeated by the tsar's troops. A year later, the Nizhny Novgorod headman Kuzma Minin appealed to the people of Ardatovo to join the national militia — that is, the villagers were not perceived by him as rebels.

Later on Ardatovo is often mentioned in various documents: in 1628 it is listed as a yasak village Znamenskoye (this name indicates that the first Znamenskaya (Note: lit. 'Our Lady of the Sign'.) church had already been built). In the same document it is noted that there were 21 households in the village, where lived 13 bortniks (Note: Russian бортник, plural бортники, bortniki; lit. 'beekeeper of wild bees' — the term was used for ethnic Russians, who were engaged in this trade, while the Mordva people were engaged in hunting.) and 23 Mordva people. Gradually, both the total number of inhabitants and the percentage of Russians in Ardatovo village grew. This was due both to the arrival of new settlers (mainly ethnical Russians) and to the Christianisation and subsequent russification of many Mordovian families. By 1721 there were 143 bortniks and 144 newly baptised (Note: Mordovians converted to Christianity.) living in the village, which indicates that the population was fully Christianised by that date.

Two major peasant uprisings of the 17th and 18th centuries — led by Stenka Razin and Yemelyan Pugachev — directly affected the inhabitants of Ardatovo village. One of the last and decisive battles of Razin's uprising (1667—1671) took place near nearby Arzamas. After the defeat of the rebel troops, up to 11,000 people were executed. Despite the lack of precise data, local historian Alexander Bazayev suggests that among the dead could have been inhabitants of Ardatovo. The main battles of Pugachev's uprising (1773—1775) took place thousands of kilometres away from Ardatovo, but the result of the rebellion was a reform that directly affected the settlement and its inhabitants.

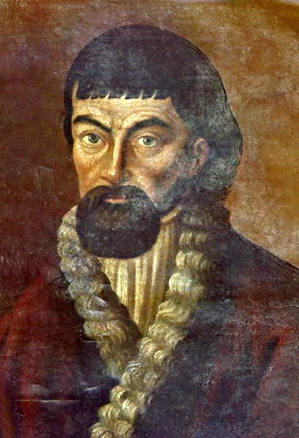
Yemelyan Pugachev had never been to Ardatov, but his uprising changed its life.

=== Uyezd seat ===
After the suppression of the Pugachev uprising, Empress Catherine the Great conceived a large-scale reform of the administrative and territorial management of the Russian Empire. One of the main measures envisaged by the reform was to strengthen local power. Huge governorates (provinces) and uyezds (counties) were divided into more compact ones, each uyezd town (county seat) was chartered as an urban settlement. Ardatov was selected to become one of such future towns, so in 1779 the former village received its new status. Prince Ivan Fyodorovich Zvenigorodsky was appointed its first gradonachalnik (town governor, mayor). 10 January 1780 [O.S. 30 December 1779] (Note: The modern Gregorian calendar was introduced in Russia on 14 February [O.S. 1 February] 1918. All dates up to that moment are given in both Gregorian and Julian styles.) the head of the Nizhny Novgorod Governorate Fyodor Vasilyevich Obukhov opened uyezd offices, and a little later a wooden uyezd prison castle was built. In order to ensure the loyalty of the new townspeople, the authorities granted Ardatov residents a number of privileges that the inhabitants of the surrounding villages and hamlets did not have — almost a third of the residents were registered as merchants and the rest as burghers. In 1781 the town's coat of arms was approved.

The "Economic Note of Ardatov district" prepared for the Empress in 1784 contains a fairly detailed description of the newly formed town. In particular, it lists the following buildings: two churches, including one stone one, offices, stockade, wine (Note: Until the end of the 19th century's Russia the term wine (вино) did not mean only grape wine, but also a strong distiled alcohol drink, vodka.) and salt shops (i. e. warehouses), two drinking houses and 147 residential houses. The town's population was reported to be 658 people. The only industrial enterprises were two tanneries. Despite the fact that most of the inhabitants were recorded as merchants, no major economic activity took place in the new town.

A regular plan for rebuilding the town was prepared soon after, however few was done. Most buildings were made of wood, and it often caused severe fires, such as in 1826 (after which architect Prokofy Semyonovich Fomchenkov prepared a new regular plan for the town) and especially in 1837, in which almost the entire town burned down, only for seven stone buildings resisted.

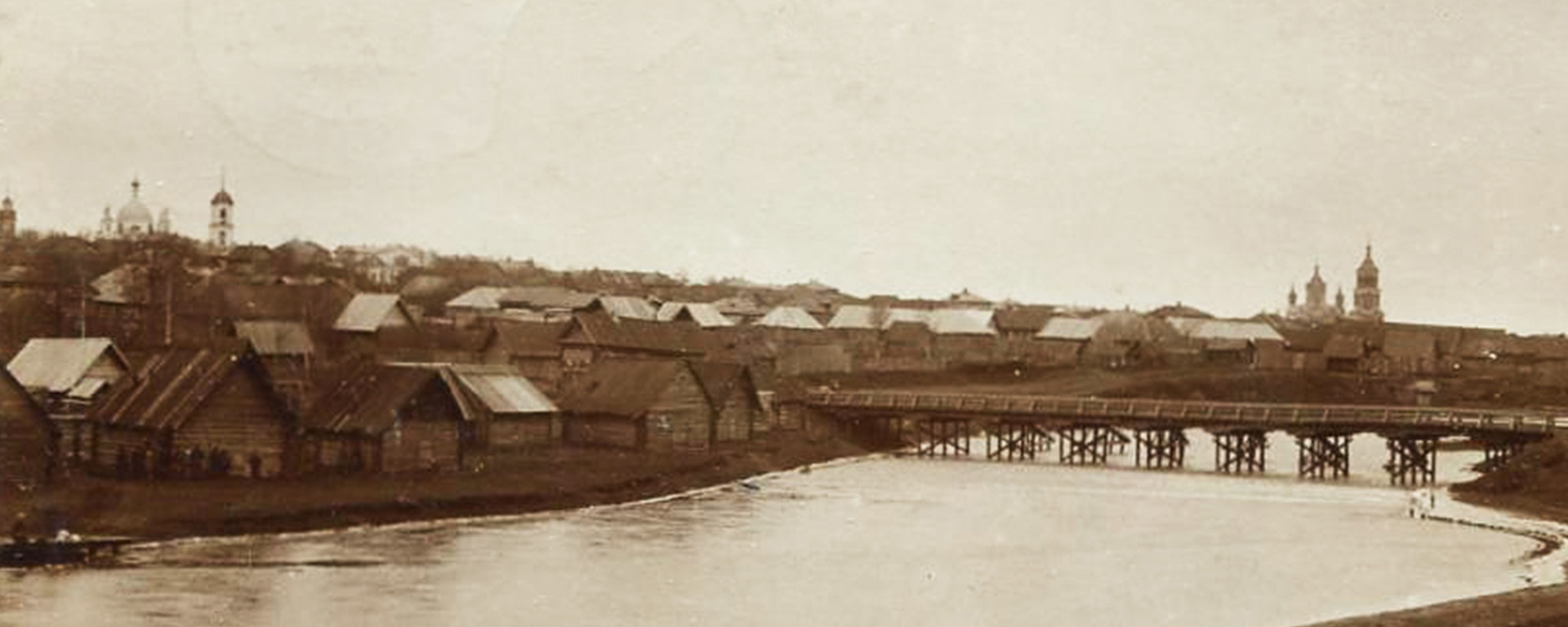
Panoram of Ardatov in the beginning of the 20th century

The town's development was slow, and it looked rather than a village. Many residents, who had been made merchants when the town was founded, fell into the petty bourgeois class, and there was no big development neither of trade nor industry. Agriculture remained the main occupation of the majority of townspeople. The writer Pavel Ivanovich Melnikov-Pechersky, who travelled through Ardatov in the 1850s, made a description of the town:

Three churches, seven stone houses, pavement posts and two or three [police] booths with rusty halberds at the doors reminded us that this was not just an ordinary village. Dirt, thatch-roofed houses, streets and grounds overgrown with grass, huge puddles [...] were trying to prove the whole worthlessness of this town [...] In a word, Ardatov is a town of which there are quite a number in Mother Holy Russia.

At the same time, unlike an ordinary village, Ardatov was still a town and a uyezd seat. For this reason, it had a rather large staff of officials engaged in organising the life of the subordinate territory. Local self-government was represented by the Assembly of the Nobility, which united landowners of the district; it was headed by a chairman assisted by several assessors. The Duma was headed by the town mayor, burgher N. S. Kurov; in addition to him it included one merchant and five burghers. The police was headed by a lieutenant colonel, his assistant, the ratman, was appointed from the burghers. The lodgings commission was headed by the police head too, he was assisted by two deputies, one from the nobility and one from merchants and burghers. There were two courts: the uyezd court, which dealt with criminal and civil cases and supervised the transfer of property from one owner to another, and the zemstvo court, which monitored the observance of laws. The town had its own prison, which was run by a trusteeship committee headed by the Marshal of Nobility, and included most of the other notable people of the town: from the mayor and the uyezd judge to the uyezd doctor and the rector of the Cathedral. Finally, the town had a uyezd treasury consisting of a treasurer and an accountant, as well as a wine bailiff — the state monopoly on the wine trade was a prominent item of budget revenue.

In 1861, two notable events took place that influenced the development of Ardatov in the following decades. On 3 March [O.S. 19 February] 1861 serfdom was abolished in Russia, which fuelled economic development of the town. The inhabitants of Ardatov were traditionally engaged in agriculture, but the reform gave impetus to the development of industry and trade. The second event was the foundation on 13 May [O.S. 1 May] 1861 of the Pokrovsky Nunnery, (Note: lit. 'Intercession of the Theotokos'.) which grew out of a religious community founded in 1808.

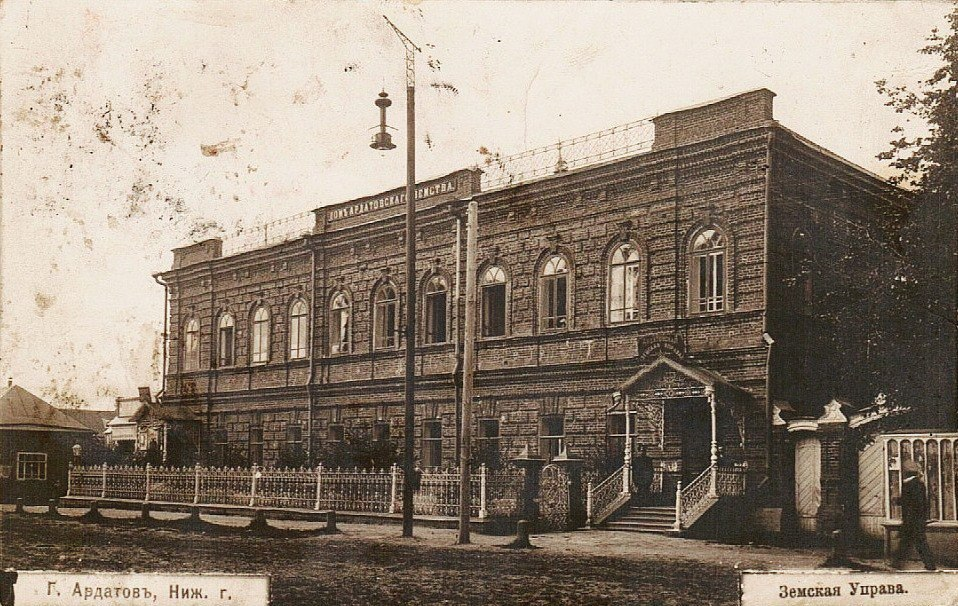
Ardatov zemstvo building. Picture taken between 1907 and 1917.

The impetus for the development of Ardatov in the social sphere was the zemstvo reform of 1864. As a result, the town, as well as the rest of Russia, got a local government body, the zemstvo. The chairman of the zemstvo was the Marshal of Nobility, elected for 3 years. The zemstvo assembly consisted in different years of 25 to 35 members, who were in charge of budget and taxation, education and medicine, construction and maintenance of roads and bridges, maintenance of prisons, appointment of officials, magistrates, pensions and scholarships, organisation of agricultural exhibitions, collection and publication of statistics. The assembly met once a year for 5 to 7 days, discussing major issues and then voting on the most important ones. The permanent executive body of the zemstvo was the zemstvo administration. Despite the notable positive contribution of the zemstvo to the town's life, in the last years of its existence the efficiency of this body significantly decreased. Many important projects did not receive due attention, while others were being discussed for years. Funding for most zemstvo organisations was poor. Unlike other rapidly developing Russian towns, Ardatov did not have a strong merchant class, so the key positions in the town were held by nobles. Among them, the Zvenigorod princes' family stood out, whose members occupied almost all key posts. The zemstvo existed in Ardatov for 53 years and was abolished after the October Revolution of 1917. The last chairman of the zemstvo was Prince Ivan Dmitriyevich Zvenigorodsky, great-grandson of the first town governor of Ardatov.

=== The upheavals of the early twentieth century ===
Although the Revolution of 1905 had a noticeable impact on the life of Ardatov Uezd, it affected more the industrial centres (especially Vyksa and Kulebaki) and rural regions than the bourgeois Ardatov. The World War I, which started in 1914, had a much greater impact on the town's life. Many Ardatov residents were drafted into the army. A significant number of them died at the fronts. This page of history is relatively poorly studied, but in the early 2000s Ardatov local historian Alexander Bazayev compiled a list of 121 dead natives of Ardatov Uezd, 9 of whom were natives of the town. The "Book of Memory of Nizhny Novgorod lower ranks of the Russian army and navy, killed, died, missing in action during the First World War", published in 2017, contains the names of 859 dead lower ranks - natives of the uyezd (and for other 18 due to homonymy of toponyms in Ardatov and neighbouring uyezds it is impossible to establish the exact origin). Of these, 11 were natives of the town of Ardatov. 5 residents of Ardatov uyezd who went to war became full cavaliers of the Cross of St. George during that war, a total of 128 residents of the uyezd got this award of various degrees, including three who left for war from the town of Ardatov.

The February Revolution noticeably revitalised life in Ardatov. On 16 March [O.S. 3 March] 1917 (or 17 March [O.S. 4 March]) a message from Nizhny Novgorod about the abdication of Emperor Nicholas II and the establishment of the Provisional Government in Petrograd reached the town. On the same day Pavel Arkadyevich Demidov, commissar of the Provisional Government in Nizhny Novgorod Governorate, appointed Ivan Dmitrievich Zvenigorodsky, chairman of the zemstvo, as commissar of Ardatov Uezd. 17 March [O.S. 4 March] 1917 Ardatov's police was disestablished, and in its place a militia headed by warrant officer Vladimir Semyonovich Kislukhin was created. In Nizhny Novgorod Governorate, as well as all over the country, the situation of dual power began to develop; on 21 March [O.S. 8 March] the United Soviet of Workers' and Soldiers' Deputies began to create their own governing bodies called executive committees (ispolkom) all over the Governorate. In Ardatov such an executive committee was created too, and it was composed of representatives of the parties in opposition to the old regime: especially the Mensheviks, Kadets and Socialist Revolutionaries. At the same time, the zemstvo was still ruled by the old imperial bureaucracy. On 13 March [O.S. 28 February] 1917 its chairman Prince Zvenigorodsky requested 50 soldiers from his superiors "to establish order"; in response, the executive committee recalled him from the post of commissioner and elected I. V. Galkin, chairman of the uyezd union of small creditors, to replace Zvenigorodsky. This was the first case in Nizhny Novgorod Governorate, and in the following months new commissars were elected in other counties as well.

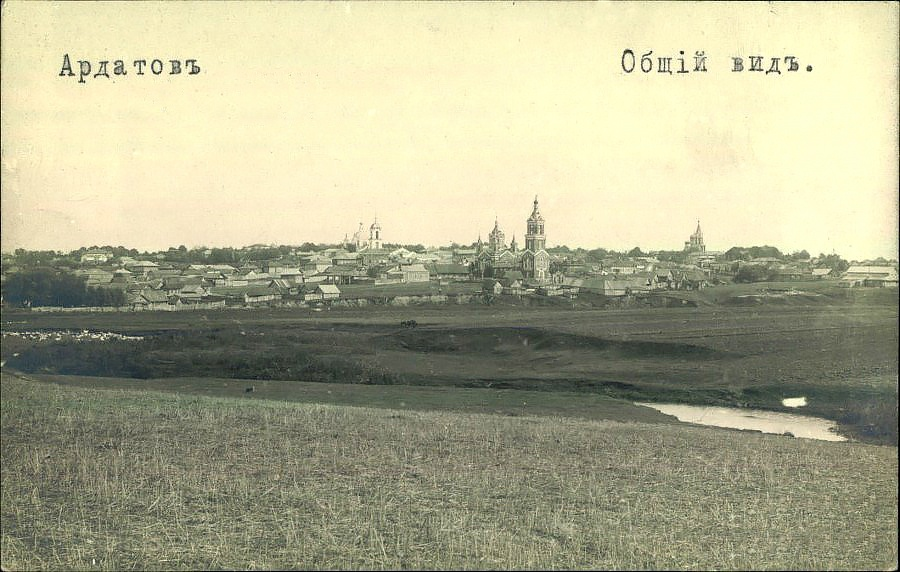
Panorama of Ardatov in the beginning of the 20th century

While the Provisional Government was postponing the solution of urgent problems until the end of the war and the convening of the Constituent Assembly, the food crisis in Russia was becoming deeper and deeper. Attempts to establish regulated "fair" (i. e. low) bread prices reduced supply, causing many farmers to be disinterested in increasing or at least maintaining the level of bread production. As a result, the area sown in the uyezd was 27% less than the year before. On 18 April [O.S. 5 April] 1917 a spontaneous rally attended by hundreds of people started in the Ardatov bazaar. The rally decided to close the zemstvo administration as an old regime institution. Freshly elected commissar Galkin tried to talk sense into the crowd, after which the authorities arrested the "instigator" — former political exile A. E. Kurov as well as his wife, but on April 21 [O.S. April 8] the crowd freed them. On April 29 [O.S. April 16] Galkin was removed from the post of commissar and his place was taken by Lieutenant P. V. Zhilinsky. However, the replacement of the commissar did not improve the food situation. On 17 May [O.S. 4 May] 1917 the Nizhny Novgorod newspaper Volgar reported from Ardatov about "hunger due to lack of bread and seeds"; the next day the newspaper Nizhegorodsky Listok cited the chairman of the Ardatov food committee Mr. Prokoshev about hunger in the uyezd. In order to get food, crowds seized government, church and private barns and plundered the bread supply. In villages the peasants divided the landlords' land, plundered and burnt their estates; in work settlements the proletariat tried to take over the management of industrial enterprises. The forests were particularly affected: on the one hand, the timber industry bought them from the landlords and cut them down in a hurry; on the other hand, the forests were subjected to uncontrolled felling by the peasants for firewood. The front was collapsing, and many deserters who had fled the war zone came to the uyezd. Violence on all sides became commonplace. The government called this process anarchy, the Right SRs called it agrarian terrorism, the Bolsheviks called it a revolutionary movement. In September, commissar Zhilinsky appealed to the provincial authorities to send him "a hundred soldiers [...] to suppress riots on the grounds of self-rule", on October 19 [O.S. October 6] he asked again for "a hundred soldiers and at least a dozen cavalrymen". However, Zhilinsky did not receive what he requested as riots occurred not only in Ardatov, but all over the country.

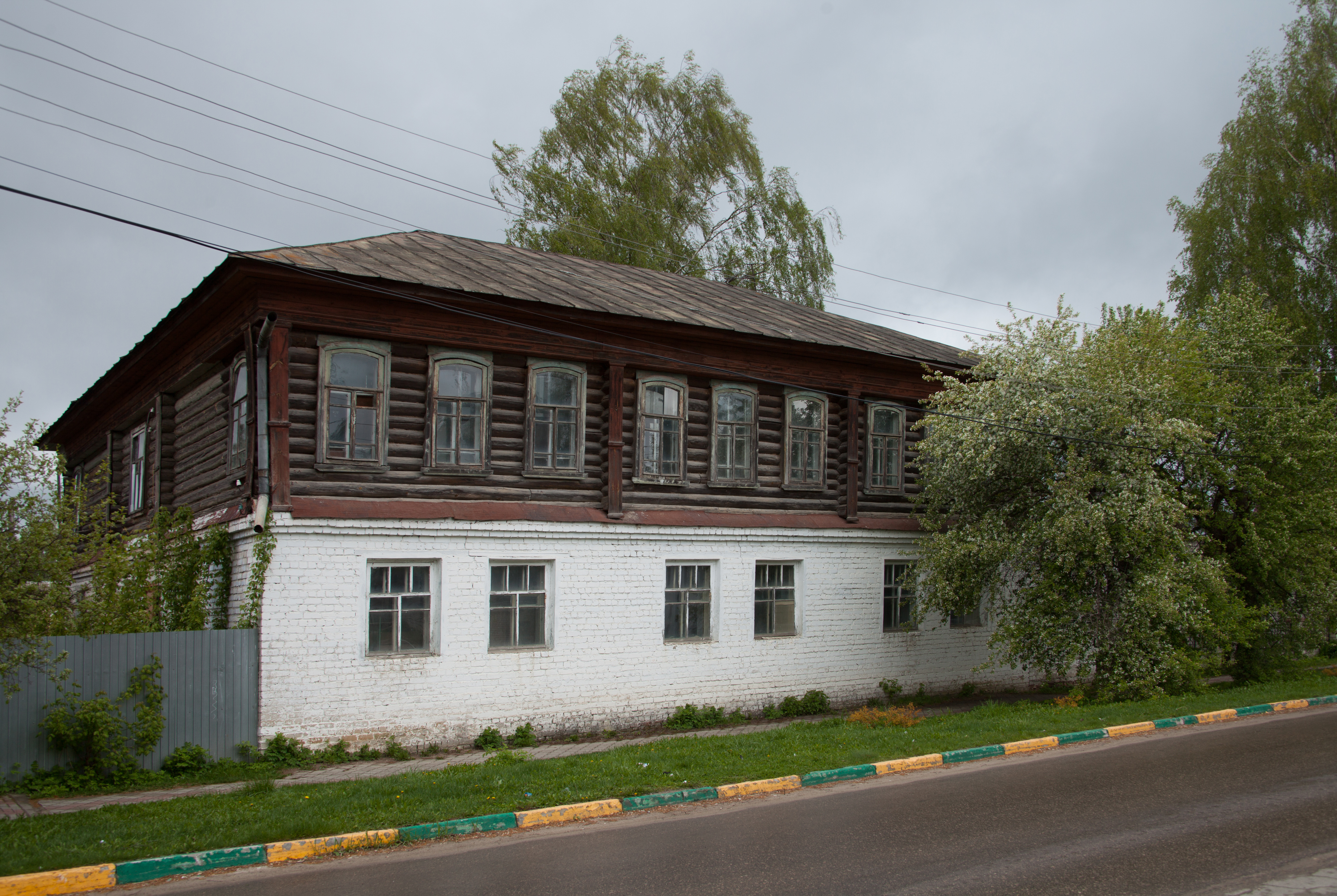
Building which lodged the first office of the Communist Party in Ardatov in 1918

25 October [O.S. 12 October] 1917 in Petrograd, the Bolsheviks carried out a coup and overthrew the Provisional Government. Throughout Russia, the Soviets were taking power. In Ardatov Uezd it happened later than in many other places, and the first to declare support for Soviet power were the work settlements: on December 12 [O.S. November 31] it happens in Vyksa, and on December 13 [O.S. December 1] in Kulebaki. In Ardatov instead, the uyezd congress of soviets was held on 18 January [O.S. 5 January] 1918, and its legality is doubtful as it was attended by only 18 delegates, 12 of whom were soldiers of the Ardatov garrison, and nevertheless peasants made up the majority of the population of the uyezd, only two of them were present at the congress. Even Vasily Mikhaylovich Dulin, the organiser of the congress sent from Nizhny Novgorod to "sovietise" Ardatov, did not conceal it. The lack of legitimacy of the congress caused problems: for example, Mikhail Vasilyevich Bandin, a member of the Kulebaki Soviet, reported on 22 January [O.S. 9 January] 1918 about protests among the workers in Kulebaki. On February 10 [O.S. January 28] the second uyezd congress of soviets was convened, at which the uyezd commissar Stepan Ivanovich Musatov reported that out of 30 volosts making up the uyezd, soviets had been organised in 21. It was February 10, not January 18, that should be considered the date of establishment of Soviet power in Ardatov, since in January it was only declared.

Mr. Musatov identified the resistance of the zemstvo, particularly at the uyezd level, as the main obstacle to the establishment of Soviet power. This resistance necessitated the application of force; on 17 February [O.S. 4 February] 1918 supporters of Soviet power occupied the administration building, resulting in the removal of Socialist Revolutionary Commissar I. S. Rozhnov from office. The new authorities, employing a more severe approach than the Provisional Government, addressed peasant uprisings in the district by dispatching troops against the insurgents. On May 23, the district commissar Musatov informed the governorate commissioner that "in all volosts, soviets have been organized, replacing the volost zemstvos." In villages and towns, the new authorities actively established agricultural communes, including the transformation of the Ardatov Pokrovsky Nunnery into an agricultural cooperative led by the former abbess Tatyana Nikolayevna Goryunova (Mother Tarasiya in monasticism). The onset of the Civil War in the spring of 1918 resulted in Ardatov becoming a frontline town. Although there were no major military operations within Ardatov itself, armed clashes occurred in Murom in July, with the town subsequently besieged. A substantial number of deserters settled in the forests surrounding Ardatov, prompting the imposition of martial law and a curfew in the Ardatov uyezd on 14 July 1919.

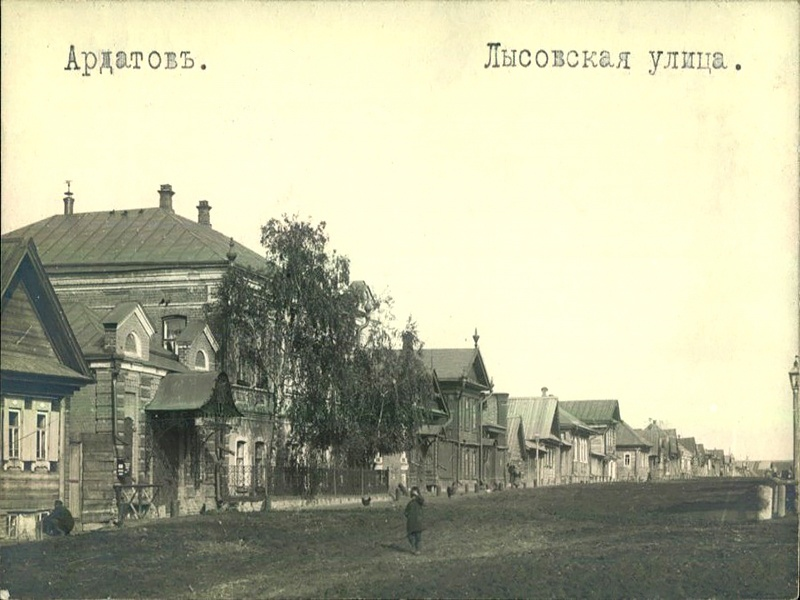
During the Soviet era, Lysovskaya Street was renamed Labour Street.

Within Ardatov, the new authorities actively enforced new orders, manifesting them even in external attributes; notably, on 29 October 1918 (a year after the Bolsheviks' coup d'etat), seven streets lost their historical names and got new Soviet ones: for instance, Arzamas Street became Lenin Street, String Street was renamed Proletarian Street, and Drive Street became to Red Street. A year later, three additional streets underwent renaming. Since early 1918, many buildings within the town were seized and municipalized, with at least 88 cases documented by mid-summer 1922. In 1919, pursuant to Article 65 of the Constitution of the RSFSR, approximately 1,800 of the 4,110 residents in Ardatov (30%) were classified as adversaries of Soviet authority and lost the right to vote.

Following the government's declaration of the New Economic Policy in 1921, life in Ardatov began to rejuvenate. The re-emergence of private trade and handicraft production ensued. For the first time in history, local press was published. The town theater re-opened, the previously neglected city garden became municipal property, and the gymnasium and college were transformed into a second-level school. Concurrently, pressure on religious institutions intensified; the Pokrovsky Nunnery was converted into a handicraft cooperative, and the town cemetery housing the Skorbyaschenskaya Church (Note: lit. 'Church of Our Lady of Sorrows'.) was closed.

=== Soviet village ===
In 1923, the Ardatov Uyezd, longstanding since the late 18th century, was dissolved, with its territory redistributed between the Arzamas and Lukoyanov Uyezds. On 10 January 1925, the Arzamas Uyezd Executive Committee passed Resolution No. 9464, converting the town of Ardatov into the village of Ardatovo. Subsequently, on 10 June 1929, the Ardatovo District was established, although its district center remained classified as a village.

In 1927, during the 15th Congress of the All-Union Communist Party (Bolsheviks), the government decided to revise the country's economic policy once again. A move away from the New Economic Policy and a shift towards industrialization and agricultural collectivization were announced. Ardatovo, as an agricultural region, was particularly impacted by the latter. Collectivization entailed the consolidation of private peasant farms into collective and state farms, which were to operate under state supervision, surrendering their products to the state at fixed prices. On 13 December 1929, the Nizhny Novgorod regional committee of the All-Union Communist Party (Bolsheviks) adopted a resolution stipulating the pace of collectivization. This resolution divided the region into three zones, each assigned distinct timelines for the implementation of collectivization. The Ardatovo District was designated as the third and longest zone, with collectivization prescribed to be completed within three years.

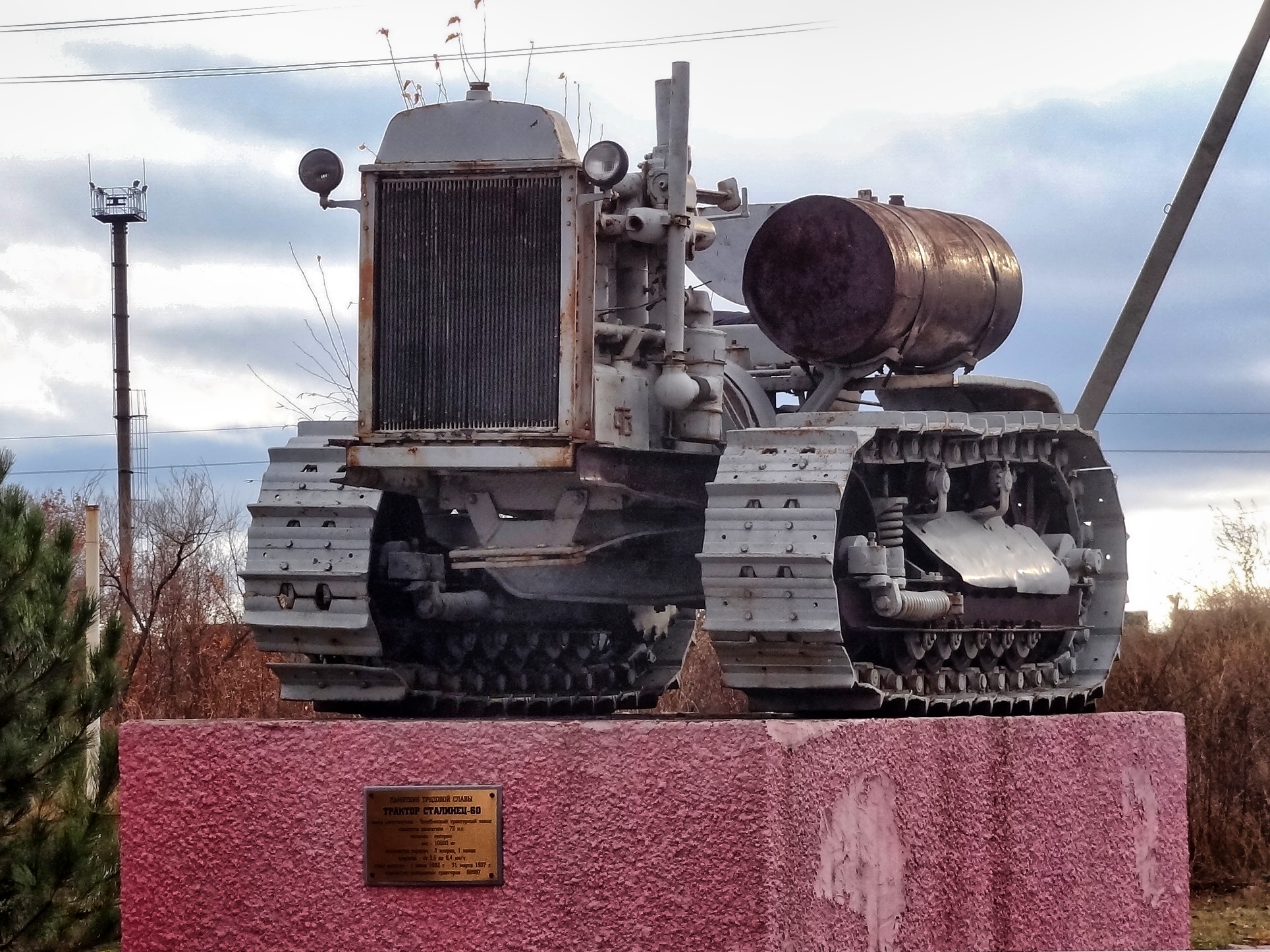
Soviet tractor Stalinets 60

By 1930, the collective farm "Our Answer to the Kulak" was established in Ardatovo, in 1936 it was renamed in "L. M. Kaganovich". By 1934, 46% of Ardatovo's populace had joined the collective farm, which remained operational until its dissolution in 1951. The authorities endeavored to recruit peasants into the collective farms and provided incentives for exemplary workers. Collective farms were the only entities in the early Soviet Union who could get agricultural machinery such as Fordson and subsequently Stalinets tractors. In 1934, the first machine tractor station in the region was established in Ardatovo, followed shortly by training courses for tractor drivers (lasting four months) and tractor brigade leaders (lasting eight months).

In 1925, the Znamensky Cathedral was closed and turned into a cinema, in 1928 the Pokrovsky Nunnery was closed and became a children's colony, and in 1933 the Ilyinskaya Church was closed, within the walls of which a power station was launched. In 1930, the district newspaper Collective Farm Truth began to be published, and in 1933, Ardatovo was connected to the All-Union Radio Network.

At the same time, the 1930s became years of harsh political repression. In 1932, a passportization was carried out, and the collective farmers did not receive passports and were not allowed to leave their place of residence. Persecution — up to criminal charges, with confiscation of property and exile to other regions — affected not only those who refused to join collective farms but also those who were loyal to the existing regime. Thus, in 1937 alone, three secretaries of the Ardatovo District Committee of the Komsomol were consecutively repressed: Konstantin Petrovich Lipov (secretary from January 1935 to January 1937), Trofimov (first name and patronymic not specified, January—June 1937), and Morozov (June—December 1937). Local historian Alexander Bazayev compiled a list of 740 persons from Ardatovo District who were unjustly repressed from 1918 to the early 1950s and later rehabilitated. Of these, 87 were inhabitants of the village of Ardatovo itself, and 11 were executed. Many of those repressed died in prisons and camps, and the fate of many others is still unknown.

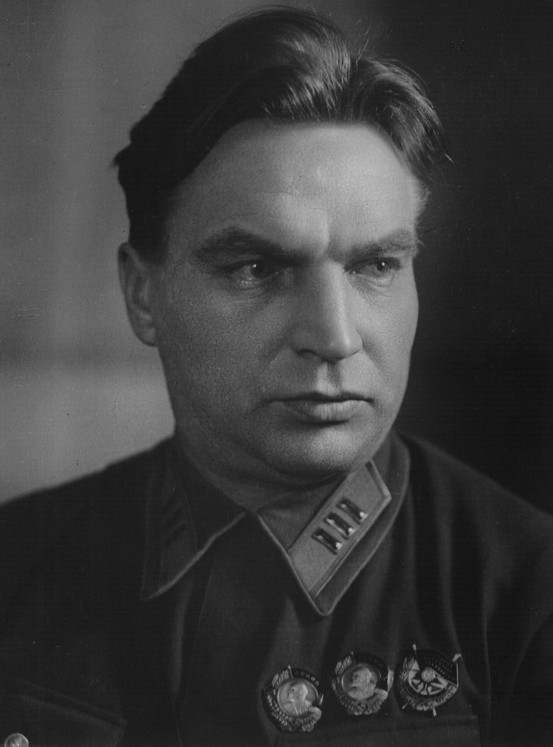
Valery Chkalov, candidate from Ardatovo in the first elections to the Soviet of Nationalities in 1937

After the adoption of the Constitution of the USSR on 5 December 1936, several elections for soviets of various levels took place in Ardatovo, as well as throughout the country, from 1937 to 1939. The elections were non-alternative, with only one candidate who always won. On 12 December 1937, elections were held for the Supreme Soviet of the USSR — the Ardatovo District was part of the Arzamas electoral district No. 123. The district was divided into 53 electoral precincts, three of which (No. 71—73) were located in the village Ardatovo, and one (No. 74) in the village of Totorashevo, which had effectively merged with it. The Chekist Ivan Yakovlevich Lavrushin was the candidate for the Soviet of the Union, while the pilot Valery Pavlovich Chkalov for the Soviet of Nationalities. Similar were the elections for the Supreme Soviet of the RSFSR which took place on 26 June 1936 (the chairman of the Rizadeyevo collective farm Nikolay Kuzmich Gordeyev was elected), for the Gorky Oblast Soviet on 24 December 1939 (the secretary of the Ardatovo district committee of the Communist Party Pavel Yakovlevich Lobanov was elected), and for the Ardatovo district and village soviets, which were held on the same day.

On 22 June 1941 Nazi Germany attacked the Soviet Union, which forced it to enter World War II. From 23 to 25 June, the Ardatovo military commissariat drafted 498 residents of Ardatovo. In total, from 1941 to 1945 10,500 people from the Ardatovo District were drafted into the active army, including 500 women. Of these, 5,500 died. The main task of Ardatovo as a predominantly agricultural region was to supply food to the army and other regions of the country, including from personal reserves. A large number of vehicles, tractors, and horses, as well as clothing, footwear, and various household items were sent to the front. The people of Ardatovo actively raised money to purchase military equipment and weapons, for example on 12 December 1942, the villagers collected 34,114 rubles in just one day. Women took the places of men who left for the front; in 1942, 6 women were chairpersons of collective farms, 66 were farm managers, and 570 were team leaders. At the Ardatovo machine and tractor station, 75% of all work was performed by women. From 1942 to 1945, up to 280 children lived in the Ardatovo orphanage, including those evacuated from besieged Leningrad.

In November 1944, by the decision of the Supreme Soviet of the RSFSR, the Mukhtolovo District was created in the northern part of the Ardatovo District; its center, the village of Mukhtolovo was transformed into a work settlement in early 1946. Mukhtolovo District existed until November 1957, afterwards its territory was reintegrated into the Ardatovo District.

=== Work settlement ===
In 1959, the village of Ardatovo was transformed into the work settlement of Ardatov. In 1962, the villages of Totorshevo and Moshkoley were incorporated into Ardatov, with which it had effectively merged by that time.

Starting from the 1960s, Ardatov began to acquire the features of a town, and industry began to develop more actively there. In 1966 (according to other sources, in 1969) a branch of the Moscow military factory Mosdetal was opened in the town (which eventually became its backbone enterprise); the founder and first director of the enterprise was Ivan Alekseyevich Khripunov. The emergence of industry required new labor, which led to an increase in the population of the town: from 4,500 to 10,500 people over several years. The food industry developed, including a dairy plant and a bread factory. The influx of additional residents created the need for the development of the town's infrastructure.

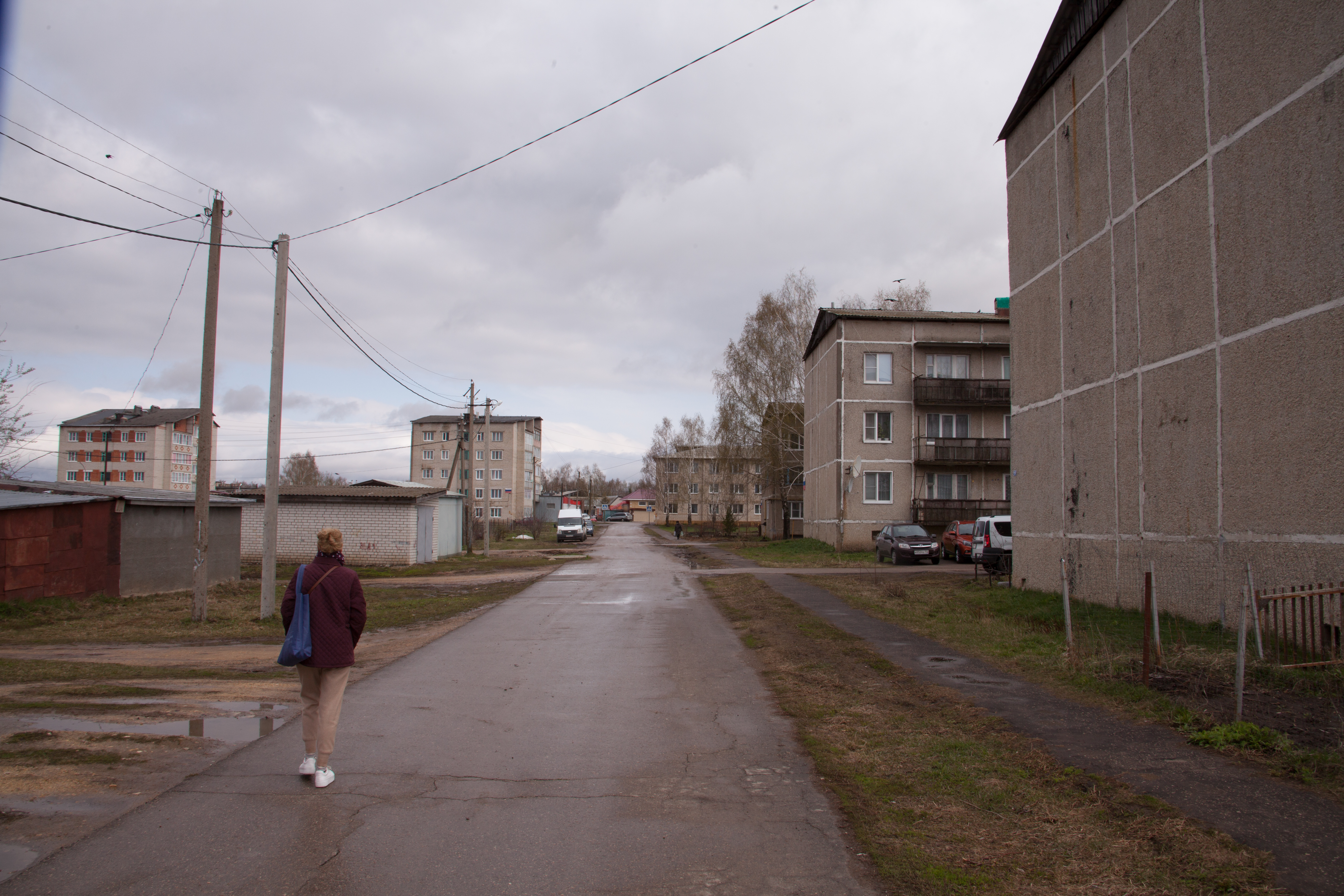
Residential houses in Ardatov

The 1960s to 1980s were years of active construction in Ardatov. Dozens of apartment buildings were constructed for factory employees, primarily located in the southern part of the town. In the late 1960s to early 1970s, new buildings for the district hospital with 250 beds and a clinic with 600 visits per shift were erected. In 1968, the cinema Zvezda (Star) was opened at the corner of 30 Years of VLKSM and Lenin streets (previously it was located in the Znamensky Cathedral, which was closed in 1925). In 1975, a new building for secondary school No. 2 was constructed, in 1973 a bus station was built, in 1978 a cultural center was established, and in 1983 the building of the State Bank (now the courthouse) was completed. However, much like before the October Revolution, the town resembled a rural locality more than an urban one. According to counts conducted in the early 1960s by journalist Konstantin Ivanovich Bukovsky (father of the human rights activist and writer Vladimir Bukovsky), there were 1,100 houses in the town, of which only 96 were apartment buildings. Out of 969 households, 792 kept livestock, mainly cows, pigs, sheep, goats, as well as chickens and ducks.

In the second half of the 1980s, evident signs of a crisis in the existing economic system appeared in Ardatov, as well as throughout the country. At a plenary meeting of the Ardatov District Committee of the ruling Communist Party, the lack of success in agriculture was noted in 1986, and it was stated that the District's indicators "in several respects were worse than in previous years." It was mentioned that there had been no growth in livestock production in the collective and state farms of the District for ten years.

On 23 August 1991, by decree of the President of the Russian Federation Boris Yeltsin No. 79, the Communist Party of the Soviet Union was banned, after having effectively ruled the country for 75 years. Its property and powers in Ardatov were transferred to newly formed local self-government bodies, the zemstvo assembly and the town administration, while in the Ardatov District, they were transferred to the district administration. The first head of local self-government and chairman of the zemstvo assembly was Nikolay Ivanovich Kuritsyn, who took office in December 1991.

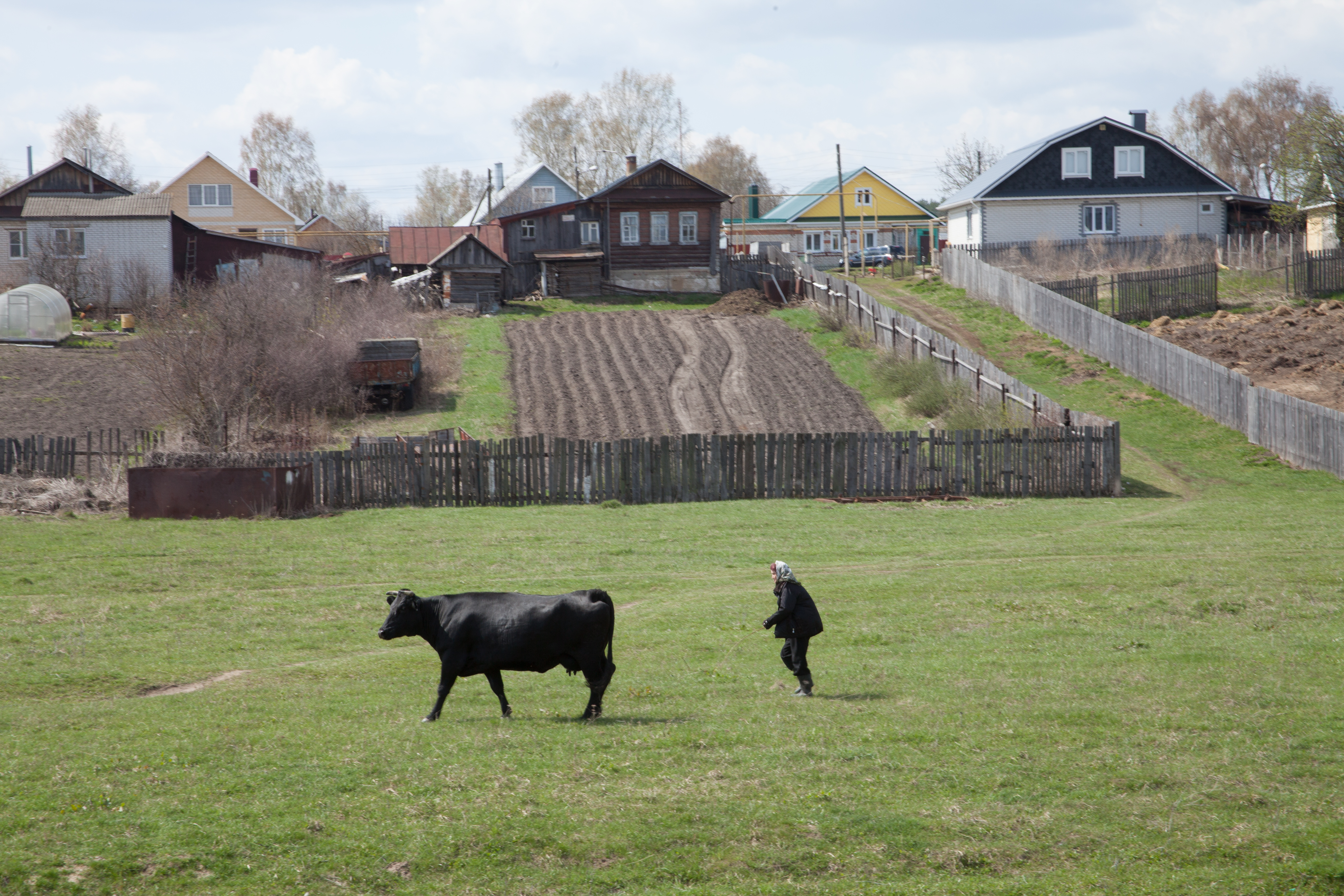
Despite its urban status, Ardatov continues to be a rural settlement in many respects.

In the 1990s, most industrial enterprises in Ardatov found themselves in a difficult situation. However, the Ardatov branch of the Mosdetal factory, which lost orders due to the reduction of military production, was transformed into the joint-stock company Sapphire and managed to reprofile itself for the production of dental products and non-standard metal products.

At the same time, in the 1990s, the restoration of Orthodox churches in Ardatov began, all of which had been closed during the Soviet era. In 1992, a priest, Mikhail Semyonovich Rezin, came to Ardatov and became the rector of the Znamensky Cathedral, which at that time housed one of the workshops of the Sapphire factory. In 1994, the Russian Orthodox Church rebecame the owner of the cathedral's building, and it was gradually restored.

On 15 June 2004, by Law No. 60-Z of the Nizhny Novgorod region "On granting municipal formations — cities, urban settlements, and rural councils of the Nizhny Novgorod region the status of urban or rural settlements", an administrative entity called "urban settlement of the Town of Ardatov" was established, it included, in addition to Ardatov itself (taking into account subsequent changes), 20 other surrounding villages and hamlets.

== Geography ==
=== Location ===
Ardatov is located in the Ardatov Municipal District, which is situated in the southwestern part of the Nizhny Novgorod Oblast of Russia. Ardatov is 165 kilometers (103 mi) southwest of Nizhny Novgorod and 430 kilometers (270 mi) east of Moscow.

The town stands on the Lemet River, at the point where the Siyazma stream flows into it, after which the Lemet changes the direction of its flow from north to northeast. The majority of the town is on the right bank of Lemet; on the left bank are the Zarechnaya (north of Ardatov) and the Moshkoley parts (its southwest). Roads leading to Arzamas, Diveyevo/Sarov, Murom/Pavlovo, and Vyksa converge in Ardatov. The area of the town is 1,198.52 hectares (2,961.6 acres).

The nearest railway station, Mukhtolovo, is 28.5 kilometers (17.7 mi) north of Ardatov.

Ardatov is in the MSK (Moscow time) time zone. The time offset from UTC is +3:00.

=== Climate ===
Ardatov is located in a zone of moderate continental climate, characterized by a cold, prolonged winter and a warm, but relatively short summer. On average, 450–550 millimetres (18–22 in) of precipitation in water equivalent falls annually, with 68% of rain and 32% of snow. The average annual relative humidity is 76%. The snow cover reaches 50 centimetres (20 in), and in particularly snowy winters, it can exceed 1 metre (39 in) or more.

Spring arrives abruptly, usually by mid-April, but frosts happen often until mid-May. Summer is relatively short and quite hot — temperatures can reach up to 36 °C (97 °F) in some years. The summer peak temperature is usually reached in July. Thunderstorms are common at the end of spring and summer, up to 20 per year, and hail falls almost every year. Autumn arrives in September and lasts until early November, frosts are common since September. Winter begins in early November and continues until mid-March. Usually, the first snow comes in October and lays for five months, melting around April 10—15. The ground freezes to a depth of 70–90 centimetres (28–35 in).

The average vegetation period is 189 days, the frost-free period is 137 days.

Climate data for Ardatov
Month	Jan	Feb	Mar	Apr	May	Jun	Jul	Aug	Sep	Oct	Nov	Dec	Year
Mean daily maximum °F	23	23	34	52	66	72	75	72	59	46	32	25	48
Daily mean °F	16	18	27	45	55	63	66	63	52	41	28	21	41
Mean daily minimum °F	10	10	19	34	45	52	55	52	43	34	23	14	33
Average rainfall inches	0.21	0.20	0.43	1.0	1.47	2.24	2.07	1.97	1.72	1.48	0.8	0.39	13.98
Average snowfall inches	6.48	6.49	3.65	1.03	0.02	0	0	0	0.02	1.02	4.20	7.04	29.95
Mean daily maximum °C	−5	−5	1	11	19	22	24	22	15	8	0	−4	9
Daily mean °C	−9	−8	−3	7	13	17	19	17	11	5	−2	−6	5
Mean daily minimum °C	−12	−12	−7	1	7	11	13	11	6	1	−5	−10	0
Average rainfall mm	5.4	5.2	10.8	25	37.3	56.8	52.7	50.1	43.6	37.6	21	9.8	355.3
Average snowfall mm	164.7	164.9	92.7	26.2	0.6	0	0	0	0.6	25.8	106.7	178.9	761.1
Mean daily daylight hours	7.9	9.7	12	14.3	16.3	17.3	16.7	14.8	12.6	10.4	8.3	7.2	12.3
Percentage possible sunshine	21	22	31	42	52	55	60	57	44	33	25	22	39
Source: Weather Spark

=== Geological structure and relief ===
Ardatov is located in the zone of the flat Arzamas steppe plateau. The Arzamas plateau is an elevated gently undulating plain, composed mainly of sulfate-carbonate rocks from the Permian period, whose bedrock is relatively resistant to erosion, covered with loams and, in some cases, glacial deposits. Among the Permian rocks, there are inclusions from the Middle and Upper Jurassic periods and the Lower Cretaceous period.

=== Mineral resources ===
- On the northern outskirts of Ardatov, there is a loam deposit with reserves estimated at 302,000 cubic metres (10,700,000 cu ft). Another loam deposit is located 9 kilometres (5.6 mi) south of Ardatov, with a volume estimated at 1,604,000 cubic metres (56,600,000 cu ft).
- 1.2 kilometres (0.75 mi) north of Ardatov, there is a dolomite deposit with balance reserves of 1,069,000 cubic metres (37,800,000 cu ft). The deposit is used for the production of crushed stone grades "400-600."
- 3 kilometres (1.9 mi) north of Ardatov, there is a carbonate rock deposit with reserves estimated at 303,000 cubic metres (10,700,000 cu ft).

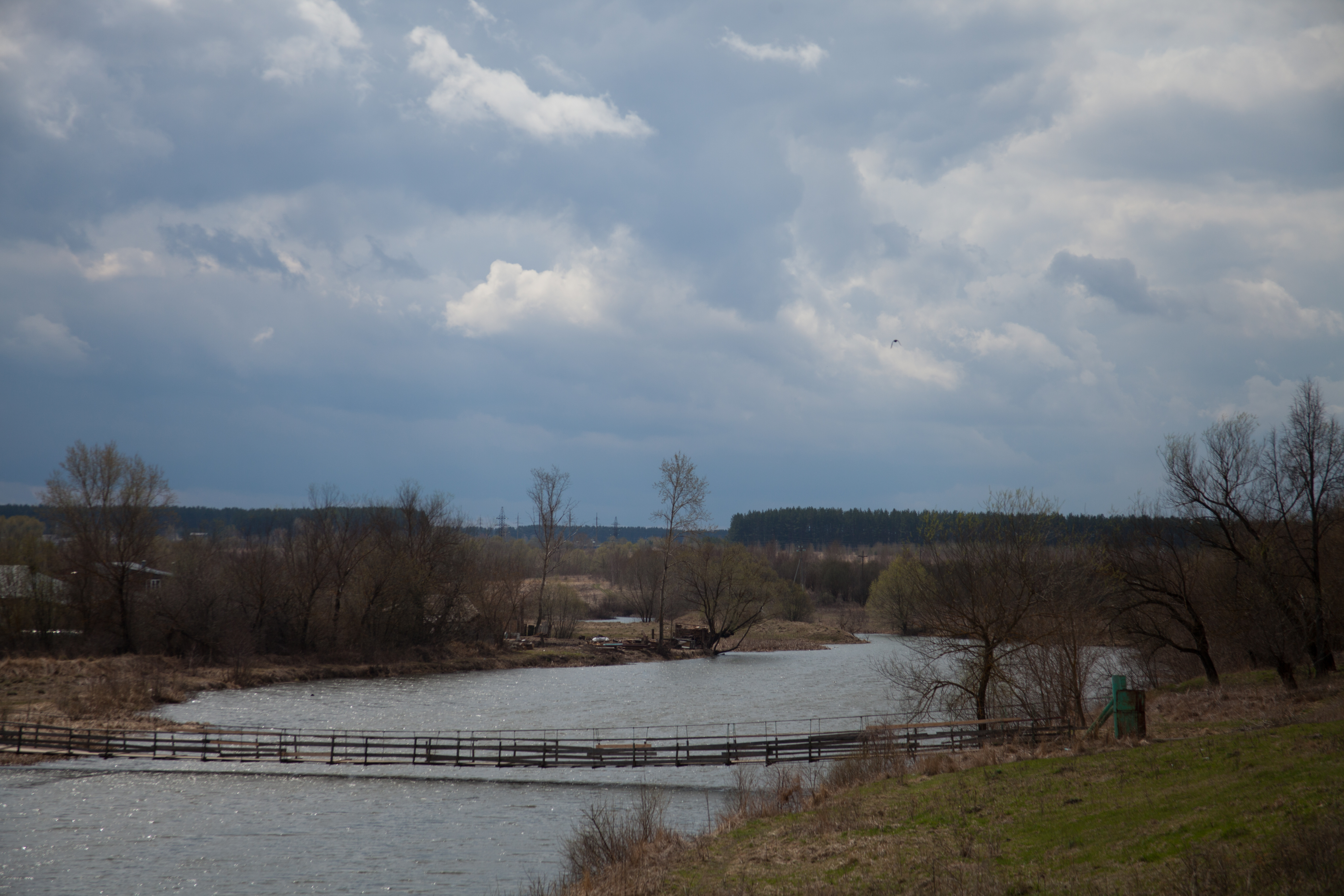
Pedestrian suspension bridge over the Lemet River

=== Hydrography ===
Ardatov and its immediate surroundings is characterized by a relatively developed hydrographic network. The Lemet River flows through the town, and at its border is the mouth of the left tributary of the Lemet — the Siyazma stream. In the 1950s, a dam was built on the Lemet River, raising the water level. In the vicinity of Ardatov there are also many seasonal streams and small rivers, many of which are unnamed. All these water bodies belong to the plain type. Groundwater is located at a depth of up to 40 metres (130 ft).

Industrial enterprises, housing and communal services, power enterprises, and agriculture are the main pollutants of streams and groundwater of the Ardatov area. Local authorities are taking measures to organize sanitary zones along the rivers and near water intakes, which should help to solve existing environmental problems.

=== Soils ===
Ardatov stains mainly on gray forest soils on clay loams with sandy deposits. About 70% of the land around the town is used for agriculture, which produces wheat, potatoes, vegetables and industrial crops. About 15% of the town's land is occupied by residents' the gardens.

Numerous unauthorized dumps of household and industrial waste, most of which are situated near industrial enterprises, are one of the main causes of soil pollution in the town and its surroundings. The second cause are emissions of engine pollutants near highways.

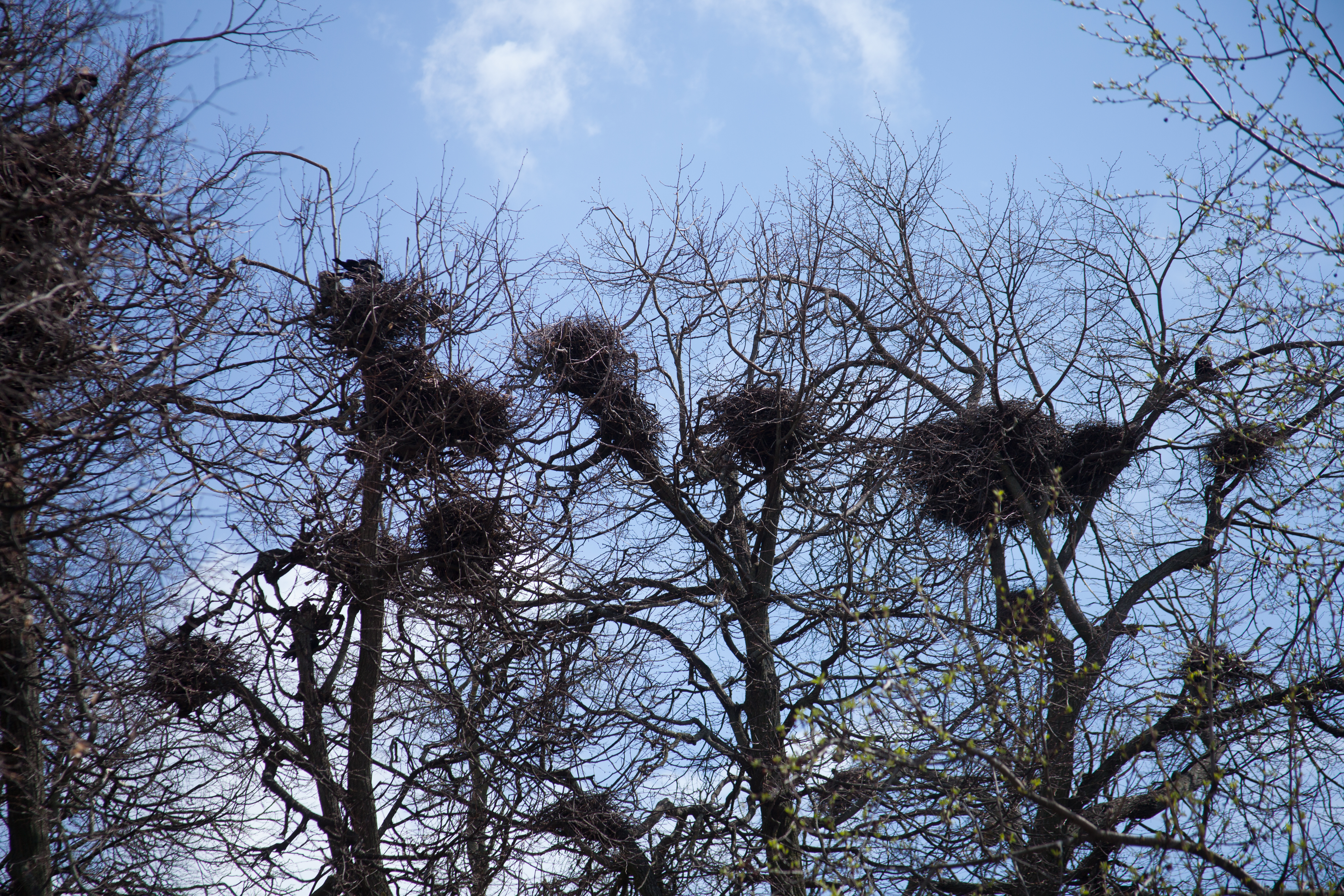
Nests of rooks in the Ardatov park

=== Vegetation ===
In the past, deep oak forests grew all over around Ardatov. Nowadays they have been almost completely destroyed in the town and in the south of the Ardatov Municipal District, but they are still numerous in its northern part, along the right bank of the Tyosha River. Today, the surroundings of the town are forest steppe.

The Ardatov town park was recorded in 1986 as a regional natural monument. The park's area is 2 hectares (4.9 acres), and it is divided into two parts — old and new. In the old part, there are lime trees over a hundred years old, while in the new part grow birches, limes, and maples aged 20–30 years. Several types of shrubs, including Tatar honeysuckle, Elaeagnus angustifolia and some others, grow in the park too.

=== Fauna ===
Just a couple of hundred years ago, the surroundings of Ardatov were abundant with squirrels, beavers, martens, elk, brown bear, and other game animals. On 18 February [O.S. 6 February] 1897, the Nizhny Novgorod newspaper Volgar reported:

Ardatov, Nizh. Province. Recently, local hunter Mr. Komarov killed three bears, one of which weighs over 15 poods. Recently, an unprecedented number of wolves has been observed here; packs of 10 or 12 wolves often roam around villages.

In the forests, birds included capercaillie, hazel grouse, and black grouse, while in the steppe zone, there were great bustards and Pallas's sandgrouse. In the early 20th century, due to economic activities and uncontrolled hunting, the population of these animals sharply decreased, with many on the brink of extinction. Later, measures were taken to restore the population, which led to significant positive changes.

== Government ==
=== Administrative affiliation ===
Ardatov is first mentioned in 1578 as Ordatova village, which was under the jurisdiction of the Kazan Palace Prikaz. In 1708, the Russian Empire was divided into governorates, and the village of Ardatovo became part of the Kazan Governorate. In 1719, the Kazan Governorate was divided into three provinces, one of which had its administrative center in Ardatovo. In 1779, the Nizhny Novgorod Namestnichestvo (Note: lit. 'Viceroyalty'.) was established, which was renamed to governorate a few years later. The namestnichestvo was divided into 13 uyezds, including the Ardatov Uyezd, and the village of Ardatovo was transformed into an uyezd town (county seat). The uyezd covered a vast territory that includes the modern Ardatov, Vyksa, most of the Diveyevo and Kulebaki districts, and the western part of the Arzamas District. This administrative division generally remained in place until 1917.

In 1923, the Ardatov Uyezd was abolished, and its territory was divided between the Arzamas and Lukoyanovo uyezds. On 10 June 1929, the Ardatov District was established as part of the Murom Region of the Nizhny Novgorod Territory, consisting of 27 selsoviets of the Ardatov and 4 from the Diveyevo volosts. From September 1930, the district was directly included in the Nizhny Novgorod Territory. Subsequently, the boundaries of the district changed multiple times, both enlarging and reducing it. From January 1954 to March 1957, it was part of the Arzamas Oblast, and after its dissolution, it returned to being part of the Gorky (Nizhny Novgorod) Oblast.

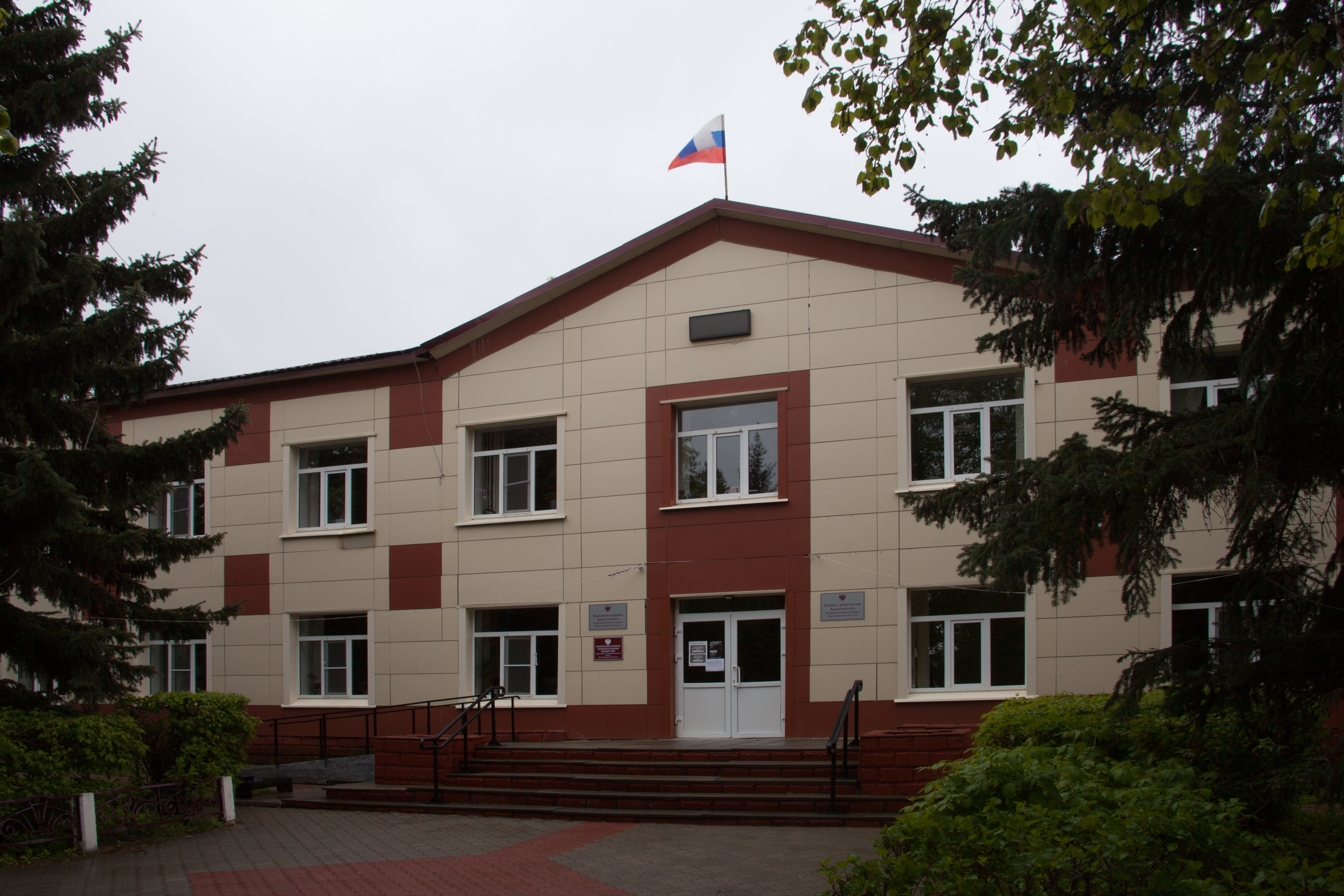
Administration of the Ardatov Municipal District

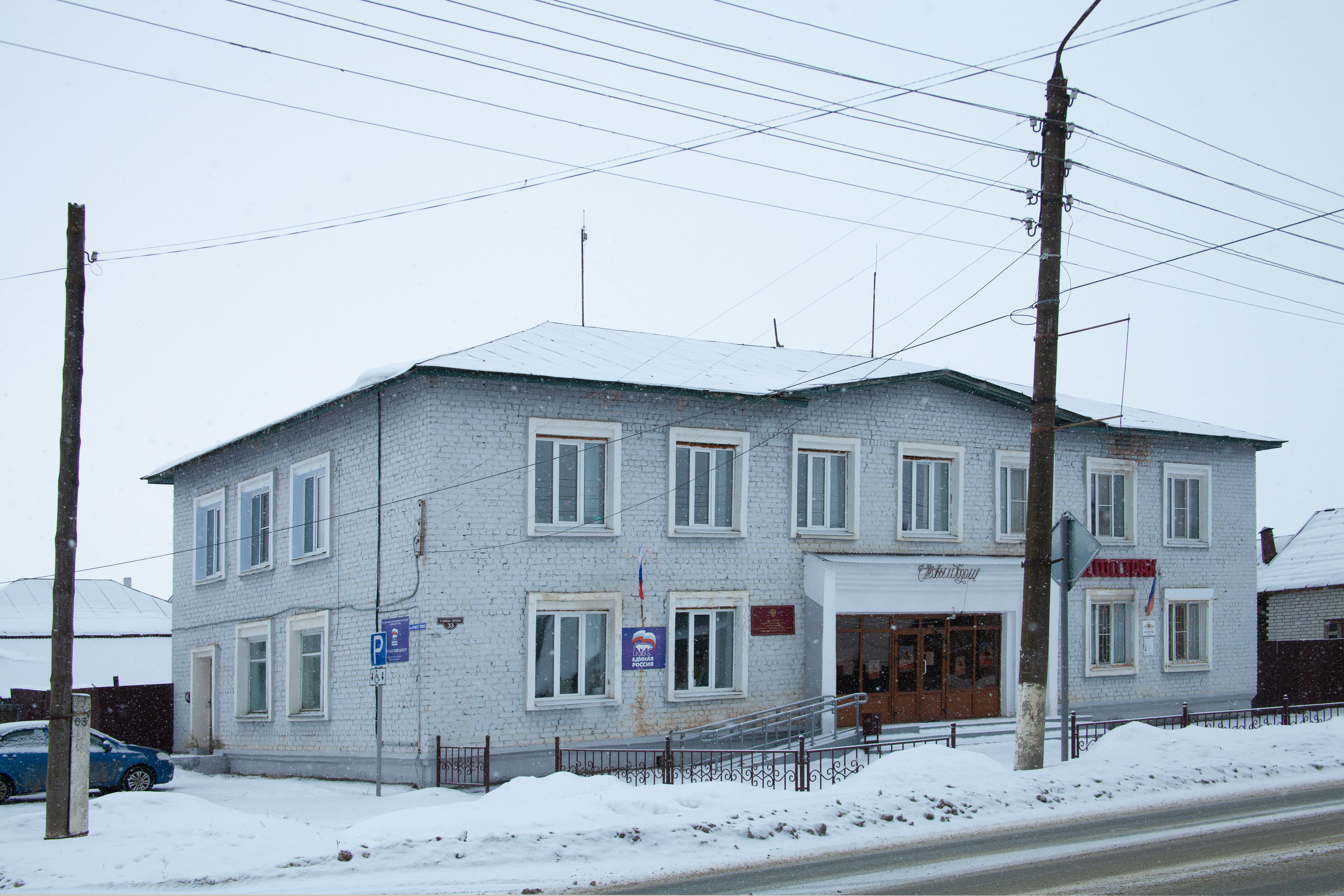
Administration of the Ardatov territorial department

On 24 October 2005, the Ardatov District was transformed into the Ardatov Municipal District with its center in Ardatov, and its boundaries and constituent municipal entities were defined. On 4 May 2022, all the municipalities of the Ardatov Municipal District were merged into one single entity within its boundaries.

=== Authorities ===
According to part 1 of Article 21 of the "Charter of the Work Settlement of Ardatov of the Ardatov Municipal District of the Nizhny Novgorod Region," adopted on 15 February 2019, the representative body of the work settlement was the Settlement Council, headed by the Head of the municipality who was at the same time Head of local self-government. According to the same article of the charter, the executive and administrative body was the town administration.

On 4 May 2022, the municipal entities of the Ardatov Municipal District, including Ardatov, were merged; the governing bodies of the settlement became the corresponding bodies of the municipal district. The administration is headed by the Head of the local self-government, and the local self-government body is the Council of Deputies of the Ardatov Municipal District.

On 24 November 2022, a new "Charter of the Ardatov Municipal District of the Nizhny Novgorod Region" was adopted, which abolished the "Charter of the Work Settlement of Ardatov". The administration of the town of Ardatov, is carried out by the Ardatov territorial department of the Administration of the Ardatov Municipal District. As of early 2025, the position of Head of this department is held by Irina Vasilyevna Zhukova.

=== Coat of arms ===
Coat of arms, 1781

The town's first coat of arms was officially approved on 27 August [O.S. 16 August] 1781:

In the upper part of the shield stays the coat of arms of Nizhny Novgorod. In the lower part, two iron hammers in a green field, placed crosswise, symbolizing the ironworks located in the vicinity of the town.

In 1861, a new coat of arms was designed, which was to comply with the rules of local coats of arms adopted in 1857. This coat of arms was described as follows:

A green shield, divided by a silver rafter, accompanied by three hammers of the same colour.

In the quarter stayed the coat of arms of Nizhny Novgorod Governorate, above the shield stayed a mural crown, and behind the shield were put two crossed golden hammers, wrapped in a red ribbon. There is no information on the official approval of this coat of arms.

During the Soviet era, Ardatov did not have any coat of arms. On 26 September 2012, the Settlement Council decided to restore the coat of arms of 1781, which was described as follows:

In the upper white field a red deer, with six-pointed antlers and black hooves. In the lower part crossed mining tools on a green field.

Coat of arms of 2012

However, on December 24 of the same year, the Town Council of Ardatov revoked its own decision made three months earlier and resolved to consider the coat of arms of the Ardatov Municipal District as the town's one.

The coat of arms of the Ardatov District, which from this moment was also considered the coat of arms of the town of Ardatov, was approved by the decision of the Zemstvo assembly of the Ardatov Municipal District on 22 June 2007, and put into the State Heraldic Register of the Russian Federation under No. 3531. The coat of arms is described as follows:

In a golden field above a green base, a red (crimson) leaping deer on guard, with black hooves and a big quantity of blue (azure) flax flowers on its black antlers.

The same decision provided the following justifications for the colors used:

Gold means harvest, wealth, stability, respect, intellect, and solar warmth. Red means courage, strength, hard work, beauty. Blue means honor, nobility, spirituality, and lofty aspirations. […] Green means nature, health, youth, and life growth.

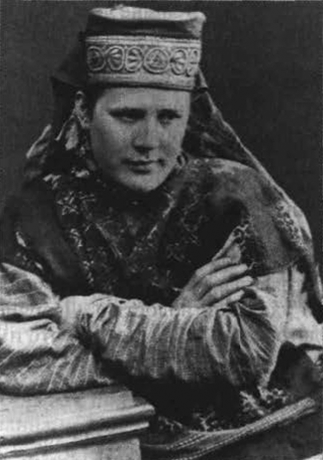
An Ardatov burgher lady. End of the 19th century.

== Demographics ==
=== Population ===
According to the first known census of the population of Ardatov, dating back to 1628, the population at that time was 39 people. Half a century later, in 1677, the population reached 311 people. Throughout the entire 18th century, the population gradually grew, with the process accelerating particularly after the transformation of the village of Ardatovo into a uyezd town in 1779. The Encyclopedic Dictionary of 1863 gave not only general quantitative data but also some additional information. According to the dictionary, in Ardatov in 1861, there were 1,303 men and 1,458, and the total number is stated as 3,761 (not 2,761, as it should be according to arithmetic). The dictionary provides some data on the social composition of the population of the town: nobles and officials — 177, clergy — 228, merchants — 110, burghers — 1,400, peasants of various denominations — 16, household servants — 113, militaries — 703, and others — 14. In the 19th and especially the 20th century, the population continued to grow, reaching its peak of 10,500 people by the 1960s, which was caused by the emergence of several industrial enterprises in the settlement, primarily the plant Sapphire. Subsequently, the population stabilized. As of 2022, the population of Ardatov was 9,768 people.

According to the "Territorial Planning Scheme of the Ardatov District of the Nizhny Novgorod Region" prepared in 2013, Ardatov was classified as a settlement of active urban development (one of the three such settlements in the district, along with the town of Mukhtolovo and the village of Kuzhendeyevo). At the same time, there is a noted decline in the working-age population, caused by an insufficient number of jobs in the settlement, which leads to a population outflow, primarily to Nizhny Novgorod and Moscow.

Population of Ardatov

Year	Pop.	±%
1628	39	—
1677	311	+697.4%
1751	914	+193.9%
1784	658	−28.0%
1797	1,425	+116.6%
1810	1,823	+27.9%
1850	2,444	+34.1%
1859	3,861	+58.0%
1867	2,962	−23.3%
1890	3,300	+11.4%

Year	Pop.	±%
1897	3,546	+7.5%
1926	3,225	−9.1%
1939	5,288	+64.0%
1959	6,264	+18.5%
1970	6,887	+9.9%
1979	7,917	+15.0%
1989	9,353	+18.1%
1999	10,300	+10.1%
2002	10,117	−1.8%
2008	9,872	−2.4%

Year	Pop.	±%
2009	9,758	−1.2%
2010	9,566	−2.0%
2011	10,153	+6.1%
2012	10,501	+3.4%
2013	10,271	−2.2%
2014	10,056	−2.1%
2015	9,787	−2.7%
2016	9,778	−0.1%
2017	9,753	−0.3%
2018	10,301	+5.6%

Year	Pop.	±%
2019	10,183	−1.1%
2020	10,058	−1.2%
2021	9,942	−1.2%
2022	9,768	−1.8%
2023	9,052	−7.3%
2024	9,023	−0.3%
2025	9,033	+0.1%

=== Ethnicity and religion ===
After the incorporation of Ardatov into the Russian state in 1552, its population remained mixed for a significant time in both ethnic and religious terms: Orthodox Russians and pagan Mordvins lived together. According to the first known population census of Ardatov dated 1628, the percentage of the Russian population was 36%. By 1677, the village had 80% Russians, due both to the arrival of new settlers as well as the baptism and subsequent Russification of the Mordvins. The complete Christianization of the local population was completed no later than 1721. The Encyclopedic Dictionary of 1862 provides a picture of the religious composition of the town's population: Orthodox - 2,665, Old Believers - 77, Protestants - 7, Jews - 10, Muslims - 2 (Orthodox constituted 97%).

According to the All-Russian Population Census of Russia in 2020-2021, out of 9,188 residents of Ardatov, 8,741 indicated their ethnic affiliation. The responses were distributed as follows: Russians - 8,584, Armenians - 26, Roma - 21, Tatars - 7, Ukrainians - 4, Azerbaijanis, Chuvash, Moldovans, and Mordvins — 3 each, Lezgins — 2, Cossacks, Georgians, Germans, Latvians, Mari, Ossetians, and Tajiks - 1 each. Sixty-seven people indicated another ethnicity, not listed in the census forms, and 11 stated "no ethnic affiliation." Thus, of those who answered the question about their ethnicity, 98% identified themselves as Russians.

=== Freemen ===
Here is the list of the freemen of Ardatov sorted by year:

1. 1813 — Ivan Ivanovich Vesselovsky — bailiff.
2. 1850 — Fiodor Mikhaylovich Vizgalin — merchant of the 2nd guild.
3. 1870 — Pavel Petrovich Tverdov — zemstvo employee.
4. 1880 — Ivan Pavlovich Krasheninnikov — merchant of the 2nd guild.
5. 1887 — Ivan Nikolayevich Scheglov — priest of the hospital church.
6. 1890 — Nikolay Mikhaylovich Pedevtov — zemstvo employee.
7. 1897 — Dmitry Fiodorovich Monakhov — zemstvo employee.
8. 1898 — Ivan Georgiyevich Vvedensky (Note: As per other data Vassilyevich) — provost of Znamensky Cathedral.
9. 1898 — Agrippina Alekseyevna Pokrovskaya — school teacher.
10. 1898 — Vassily Stepanovich Puzanov — police officer.
11. 1898 — Issay Abramovich Sadovnikov — civil officer.
12. 1898 — Ivan Petrovich Yuzhilin — zemstvo employee.
13. 1900 — Fiodor Dmitriyevich Pokrovsky — priest.
14. 1901 — Ivan Ivanovich Ivanov — magistrate.
15. 1904 — Makrina Ivanovna Kolvayts — noblewoman.
16. 1904 — Vladimir Aleksandrovich Popov — statistician of the Nizhny Novgorod Governorate zemstvo.
17. 1905 — Agrippina Alekseyevna Sekretova — tradeswoman.
18. 1905 — Sergey Vassilyevich Simakov — uyezd treasury officer.
19. 1910 — Dmitry Fiodorovich Pokrovsky — priest.
20. 1910 — Ivan Petrovich Steklov — uyezd treasury officer.
21. 1911 — Ivan Ivanovich Shustikov — merchant.
22. 1912 — Viacheslav Mikhaylovicg Gratsianov — doctor of the zemstvo hospital.
23. 1915 — Semion Grigoryevich Troitsky — head of gymnasium for boys.
24. 1987 — Timofey Stepanovich Liutin — first tractor driver of the Ardatov District.
25. 1987 — Nadezhda Iossifovna Novikova — doctor.
26. 1987 — Vassily Pavlovich Suchkov — builder.
27. 1987 — Ivan Vassilyevich Turutov — second secretary of the Ardatov District committee of the Communist Party.
28. 1997 — Antonina Ivanovna Zelyina — director of the Ardatov dairy plant.
29. 1997 — Yury Nikolayevich Ivanchenko — hospital administrator.
30. 1997 — Ivan Andreyevich Kassatkin — director of the Ardatov agricultural technical school.
31. 1997 — Aleksandra Ivanovna Korniyassova — school teacher.
32. 1997 — Yevgeny Vassilyevich Novikov — secretary of the Ardatov settlement government.
33. 1997 — Mikhail Andreyevich Firov — chairman of the Ardatov settlement government.
34. 2002 — Lidia Mikhaylovna Kniazeva — school teacher.
35. 2007 — Renata Pavlovna Kuznetsova — school teacher.
36. 2012 — Mikhail Semionovich Rezin — provost of Znamensky Cathedral.

== Landmarks ==
There are no significant architectural and cultural monuments of international or federal scale in Ardatov, this is why throughout its history, not a single guidebook about it has been published. Nevertheless, there are several monuments of regional significance located in Ardatov. The reference book Monuments of History and Culture of the Nizhny Novgorod Region, published in 1981, notes and details the following noteworthy objects:

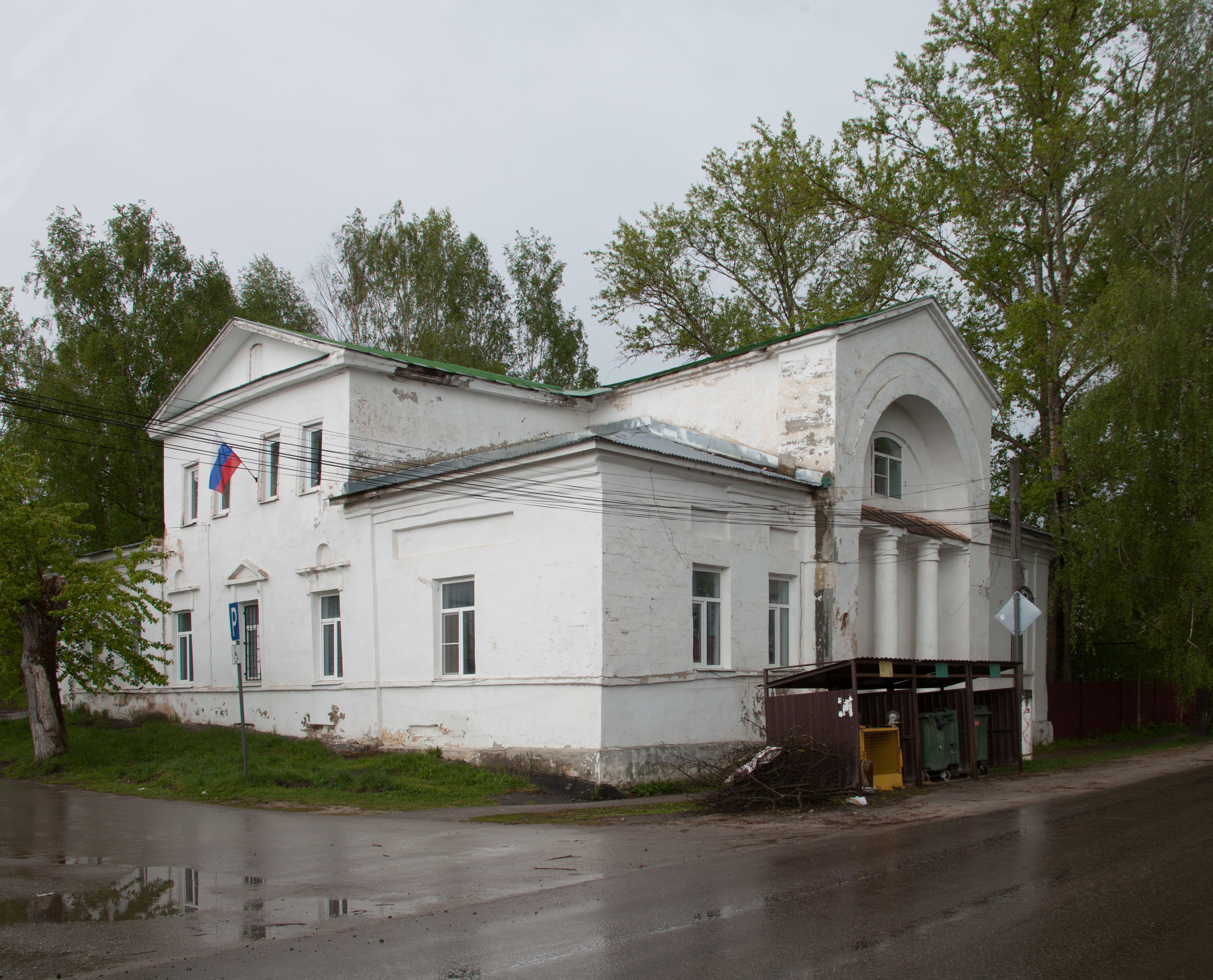
Residential house, 1834, architect Mikhail Petrovich Korinfsky

- Building which lodged the first Soviet in Ardatov (former residential house of the merchant Zolkin; 25, 1 May Street).
- Building which lodged the first office of the Communist Party in Ardatov in 1918 (22, 30 Let VLKSM Street).
- Obelisk on the collective grave of dead for the power of the Soviets (near to the road towards the village of Poliana).
- Portrait sculpture of Commissar Ivan Vassilyevich Zuyev (57, Zuyev Street, in front of Secondary School No 2).
- Residentional house, end of 18th—beginning of 19th century (14, Sverdlov Street). (Note: Later the date and the architect's name were specified: 1834, Mikhail Petrovich Korinfsky. Some sources also name the building uyezd school.)

On 3 November 1983, by decision of the Gorky Oblast Executive Committee No. 559, all objects from the 1981 directory, except for the sculpture portrait of Mr. Zuyev, were placed under state protection. On 20 July 1993, the Nizhny Novgorod Regional Council of People's Deputies adopted resolution No. 228-m, which declared a number of Ardatov buildings being regional architectural monuments. The previously included objects on the lists were supplemented with:

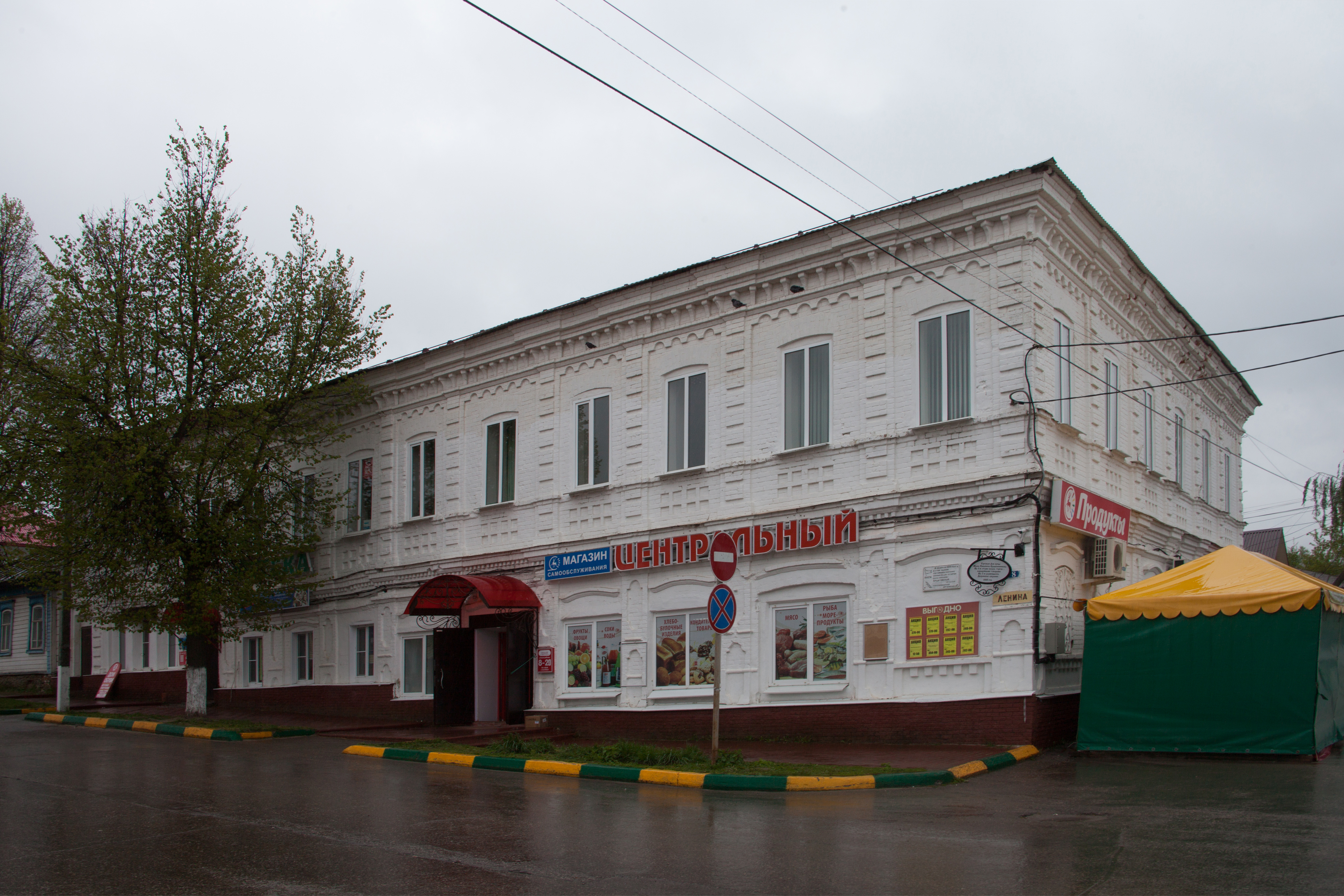
Residential house of the merchant Krasheninnikov

- Former prison (1856—1858, architect Afanassy Yermilovich Turmyshev; 32, Lenin Street)
- Shop (end of 19th century; 2, Lenin Street)
- Residential house (second half of 19th century; crossing of Lenin Street and 1 May Street)
- Residential house of the merchant Krasheninnikov (second half of 19th century; 6 and 8, Lenin Street)
- Residential house of the merchant Zelyin (second half of 19th century; 16, 1 May Street)
- Pawnshop (end of 19th century; 25, 1 May Street)
- Shops (end of 19th century; 8a and 10a, Sverdlov Street)
- Gymnasium for girls (1909; 42, Sverdlov Street)
- Uyezd treasury with forged grid (end of 19th century; 8, 30 Let VLKSM Street)
- Zemstvo administration (1897; 28, 30 Let VLKSM Street)
- Residential house and shop of Argentov (second half of 19th century; 7, Truda Street)
- Residentional house (end of 19th century; 37, Truda Street)
- Znamensky Cathedral (1802; 16 Lenin Street)
- Ilyinskaya Church (1876; 1, October Square)
- Skorbiaschenskaya Church (1829; 15, Soviet Street)

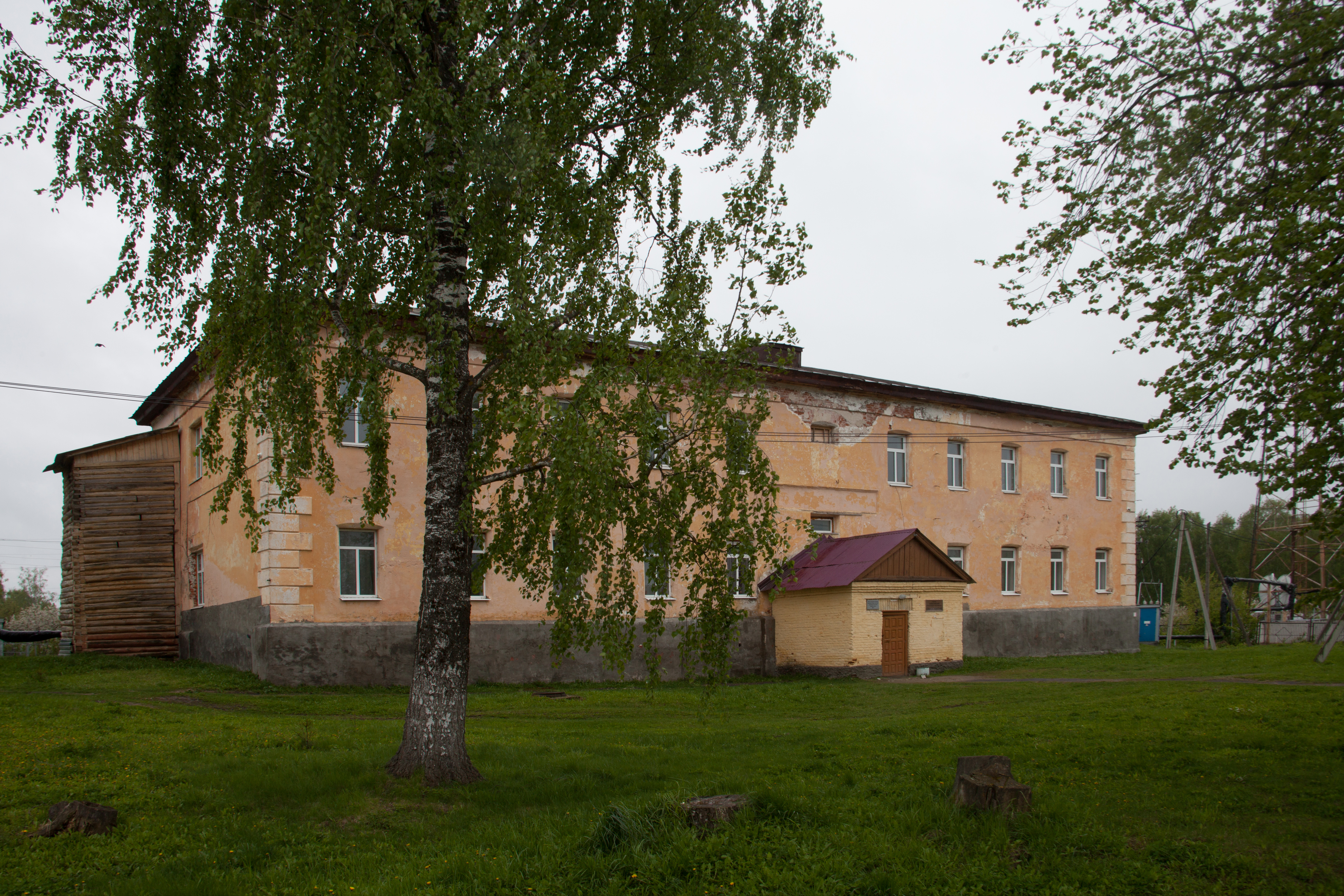
Former prison

In addition, decree No. 228-m recognized the central part of Ardatov being a protected area.

On 24 April 2000, the Department for the Protection of Historical and Cultural Heritage of Nizhny Novgorod and the Nizhny Novgorod Oblast issued order No. 5-od, according to which the complex of the former Pokrovsky Nunnery, which is actually occupied by the Federal Penitentiary Service, was classified as a historical and cultural heritage site. However, on 20 October 2014, the Department of State Protection of Cultural Heritage Sites of the Nizhny Novgorod Region issued order No. 159, which revoked order No. 5-od.

== Infrastructure ==
=== Housing ===
In the first historical source dating back to 1628, it is stated that there were 21 houses in the village of Ardatovo. By 1677, the village had already grown to 100 households, and by 1797 there were 195 households, and in 1859 there were 425 houses. According to calculations made by journalist Konstantin Bukovsky in the early 1960s, there were 1,100 houses in Ardatov at that time, of which only 96 were apartment buildings. In the 1960s and 1970s, dozens of apartment buildings were constructed for employees of the Sapphire plant, primarily located in the southern part of the settlement.

As of 2025, a significant portion of the village's residents continues to live in private houses. There are only 94 apartment buildings ranging from 2 to 5 stories high, built between 1917 and 2017.

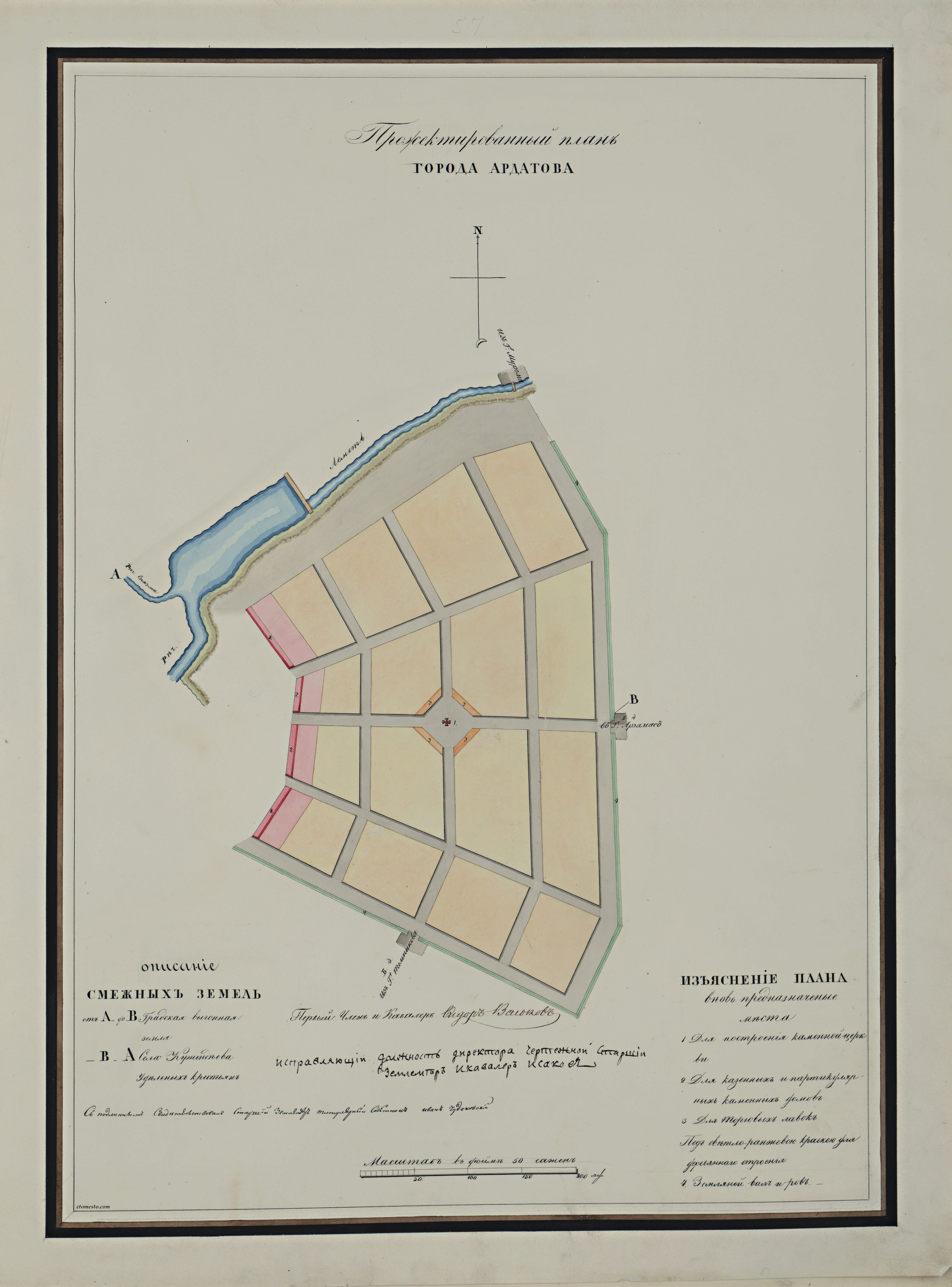
The projected plan of Ardatov dated 1800 laid down the street alignment that still exists today

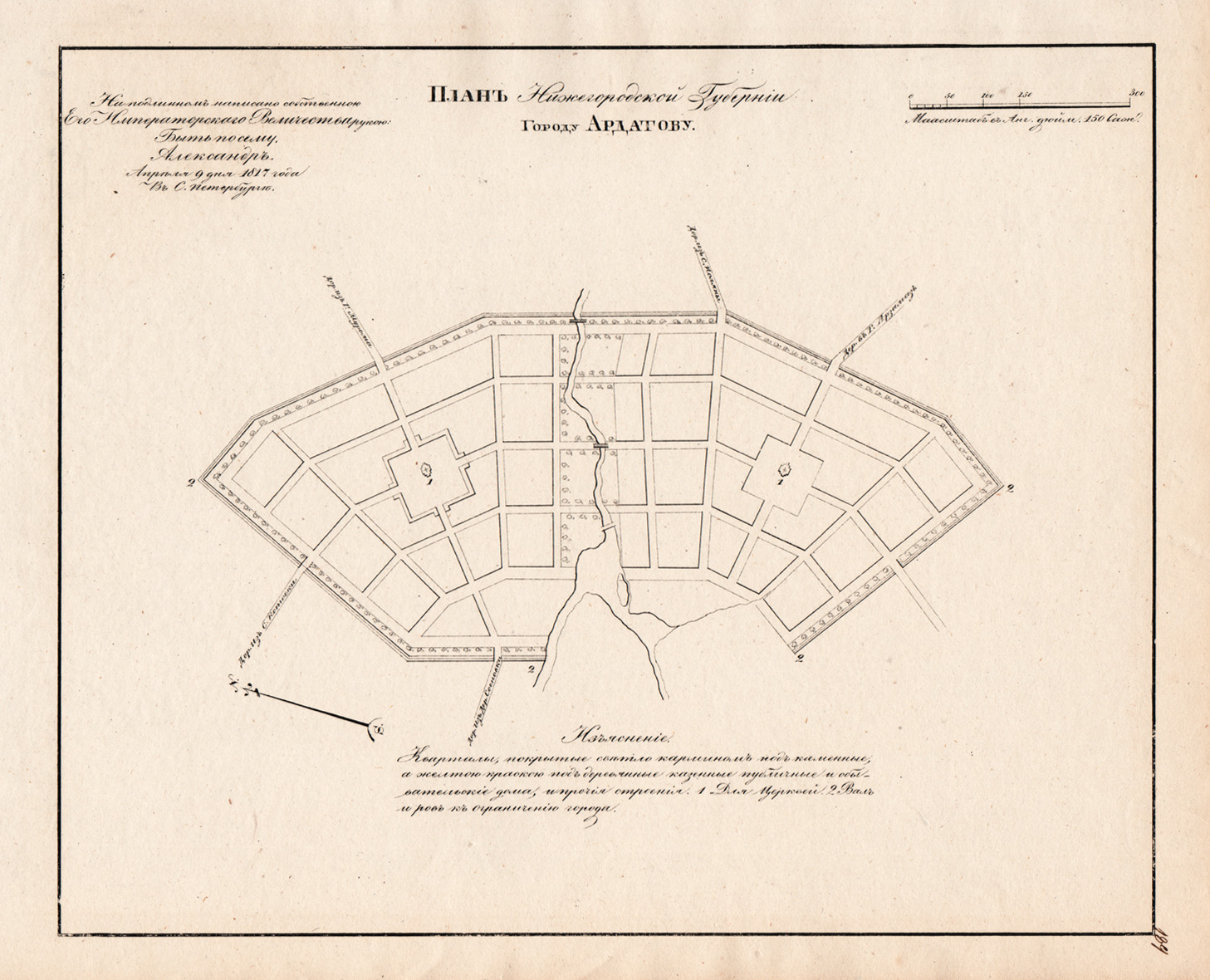
The unimplemented Ardatov plan of 1817 envisaged the creation of neighbourhoods on the left bank of the Lemet River, symmetrical to those on the right bank.

=== Streets ===
During the reform of administrative and territorial management in the Russian Empire in 1779, the village of Ardatovo was transformed into a uyezd town. In 1781, the first regular town development plan for Ardatov was prepared. The plan envisaged the laying out of straight and wide streets, with all constructed houses facing them with their facades ranged in lines, and conforming to model projects sent from the capital. The plan included the construction of stone administrative buildings and a cathedral, as well as defensive earthworks on two sides — the eastern and southern (the Lemet River and an unnamed ravine were to aid in the town's defense from the north and west). According to the plan, a square was to be created in the center of the town, where a stone cathedral was to be located, from which streets would radiate outward. Its implementation is visible in the "Plan of the General Survey of the Ardatov Uyezd" dated 1800 — according to calculations, the area of the town at that time was 97.46 hectares (240.8 acres), and the layout established then has been preserved in the central part of Ardatov to this day. On 21 April [O.S. 9 April] 1817, Emperor Alexander II approved a new "Plan for the town of Ardatov in Nizhny Novgorod Governorate," which envisioned the construction of a symmetrical area in the Zarechnaya part (which is located on the opposite bank of the Lemet River), but it was never completed.

The further development of the street network in Ardatov progressed as the population increased; as new houses were built, the street and road network developed. With the population growth, the area of Ardatov also expanded — to 493 hectares (1,220 acres) in 1969 and to 1,198.52 hectares (2,961.6 acres) in 2007.

As of the beginning of 2025, Ardatov has 94 streets, alleys, and squares with a total length of 123.3 kilometres (76.6 mi), of which 79.6 kilometres (49.5 mi) are paved.

=== Electricity supply ===
In November 1937, an electric power station was launched in the building of the closed Ilyinskaya Church, which capacity at that time was sufficient to supply electricity to the whole Ardatovo.

Nowadays the electricity is provided by the company Nizhnovenenergo. Electricity is supplied via overhead power lines to a step-down substation located on the territory of the Sapphire plant, from where it is distributed throughout the settlement. The capacity of the substation is 10+10 MW, with a reserve capacity of 5.83 MW. The annual electricity consumption in 2012 was 10,466,150 kWh.

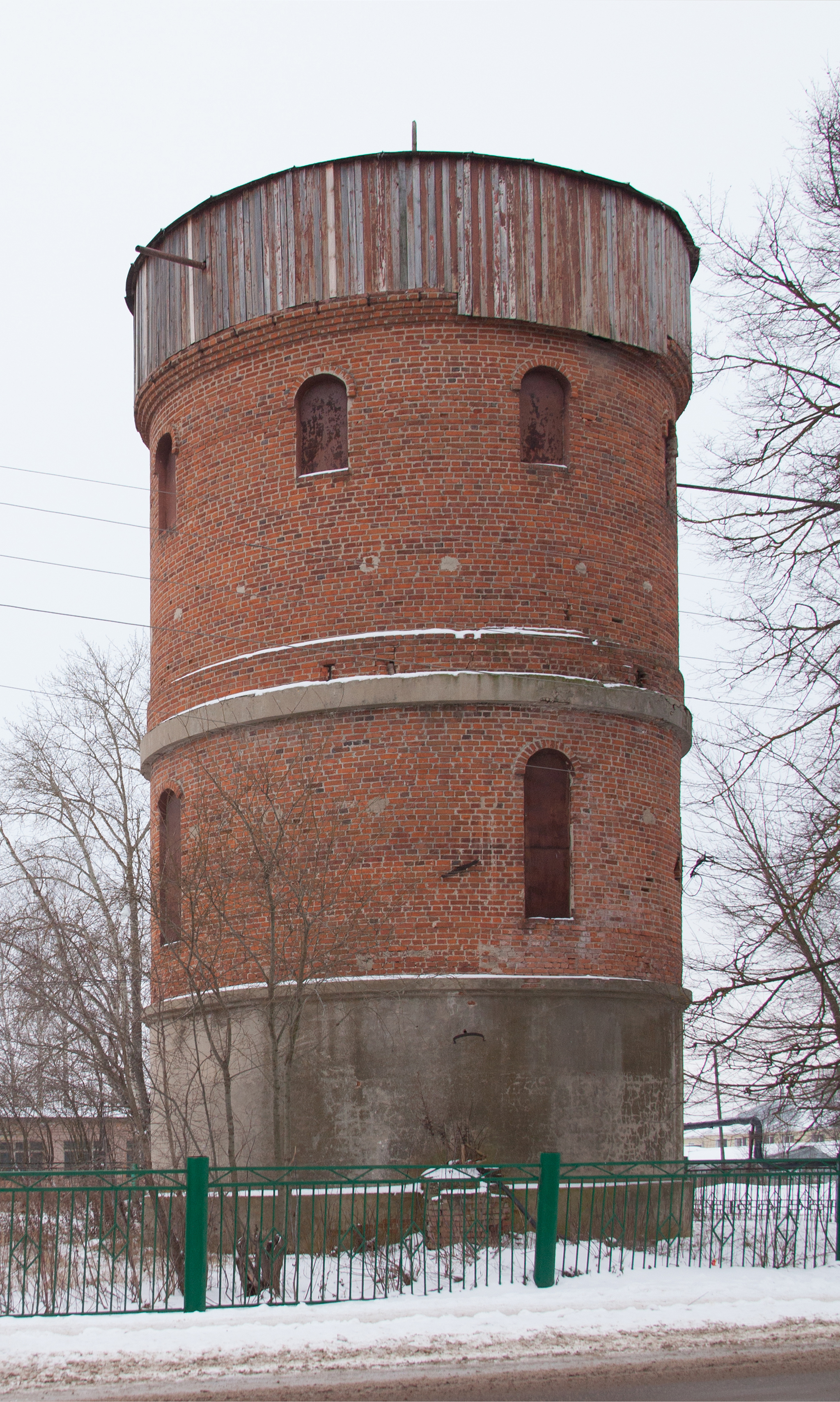
Water tower

=== Water supply and sewerage ===
Drinking water to residential buildings and institutions in Ardatov is provided by the company Rayvodokanal. Water is extracted from the Ardatov underground water field through 11 artesian wells. The average amount of water extracted is 12,312 cubic metres (434,800 cu ft) per day, which is sufficient to meet domestic, household, and partially industrial needs. The water supply network covers the entire territory of the town; however, some residents of private houses prefer to use water from their own artesian wells. The water quality meets the current standards. The entire territory of the town is equipped with sewerage, and there are treatment facilities for domestic wastewater; however, as of 2013, their wear and tear was 53%.

=== Gas supply and heating ===
The gasification of Ardatov was carried out from 1975 to 1981. Before that, the settlement primarily used bottled natural gas, had one gas distribution point, and one gas boiler in the school. During the above mentioned period, gas pipelines were laid throughout the town, connecting all apartment buildings and private houses, public buildings, and industrial enterprises.

The gas distribution system of Ardatov is serviced by the local branch of the company Nizhegorodoblgas. A branch gas pipeline from the main gas pipeline Yaroslavl — Pochinki is laid into the town, with a length of 13.3 kilometres (8.3 mi); there is a low pressure gas distribution station in Ardatov, from which gas is supplied to consumers.

Most of Ardatov is heated by a centrally managed gas boiler. In some private houses, there are individual heaters that run on natural gas.

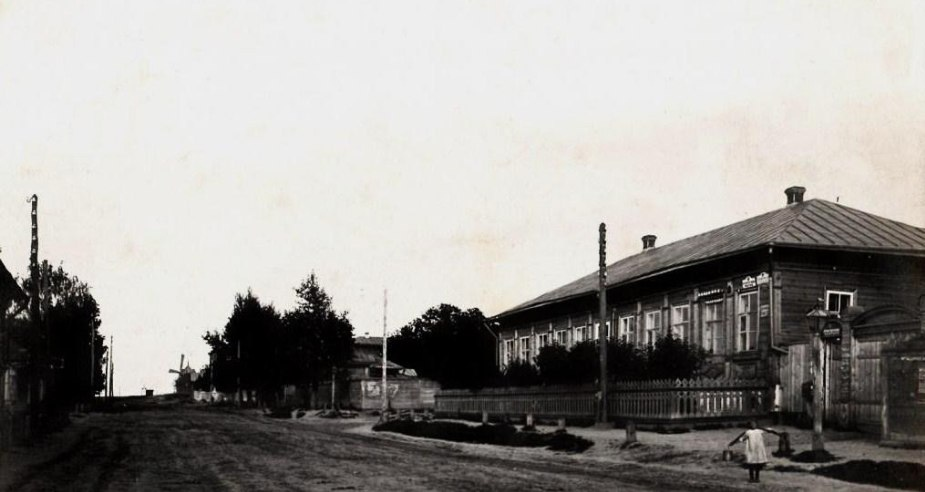
Post and telegraph office. Beginning of 19th century.

=== Communication ===
A postal service was established in Ardatov in 1779, after the town became an uyezd seat. The post was headed by a postmaster, with post roads running from Arzamas to Tambov and its branch to Murom and Temnikov. However, even in 1855, the pace of life in the uyezd town remained unhurried, mail was delivered once a week (on Saturdays) and sent out also once a week (on Thursdays). The centre of the vast district had only 2 postal horses. As of 1878, a telegraph had already been laid in the town, and a post station was in operation. In 1933, Ardatov was connected to the nationwide radio network of the Soviet Union.

As of 2025, the town has a branch of the Russian Post (postcode 607130). There is a wired telephone communication system operating on a one-step scheme. The mobile network is represented by operators Beeline, MegaFon, MTS, and T2. Wired internet access is provided by Rostelecom, while wireless access is provided by mobile operators.

== Economy ==
=== Industry ===
In the "Economic Note of the Ardatov District" prepared for Empress Catherine II in 1784, there is a fairly detailed description of the town at that time. Among industrial enterprises, are mentioned only two leather factories (where "various leathers are produced up to 2,700 pieces worth 3,700 rubles per year"), and despite the fact that most of the residents were recorded as merchants, there was no significant economic activity.

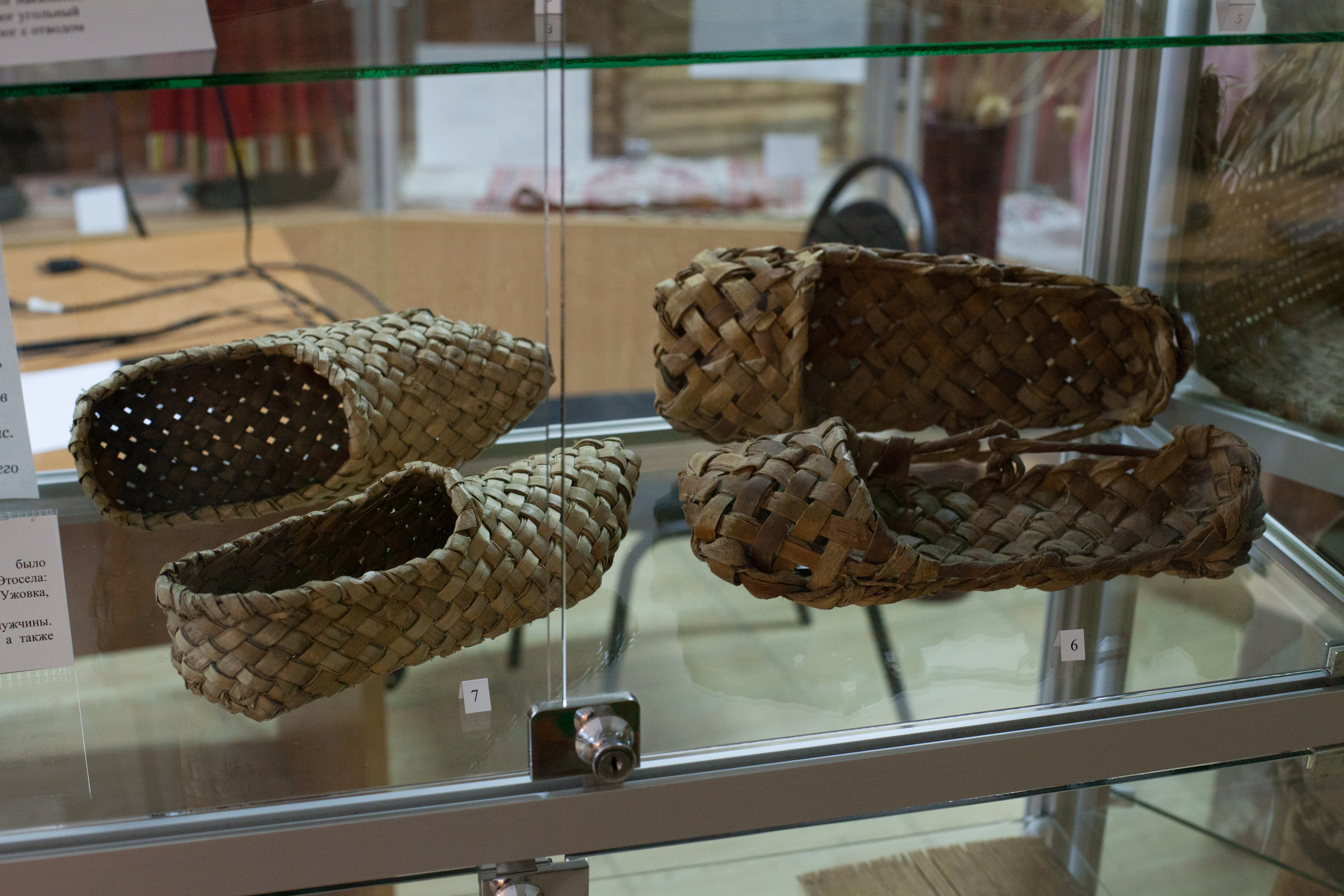
Ardatov bast shoes in its Museum of Local History

Residents of Ardatov were traditionally engaged in agriculture, but the reforms of the 1860s spurred the development of food production, primarily flour milling. By the early 20th century, in Ardatov and the villages of Moshkoley and Totorshevo, which had practically merged with it, there was one water mill, 19 windmills, and four grain mills. At that time, the town also saw the emergence of two distilleries owned by merchants I. Lakshin and S. Starov — producing up to 1,550 buckets (Note: 1 bucket was equal to 12.299 litres (2.705 imp gal; 3.249 US gal).) of vodka annually under the brands "Lakshinskaya," "Starovskaya," "Gorodskaya," "Ardatovskaya," and others; both distilleries and their warehouses were destroyed during the Revolution. Other sectors of industry in Ardatov during this period included starch production and the manufacturing of vegetable oil: there were 250 oil mills in Ardatov and the nearby villages, which produced 40,000 poods of it per year.

Blacksmithing was actively developing in the town: by the beginning of the 20th century, there were at least 21 forges. Handicraft and artisanal production were well-developed: peasants and townspeople wove bast shoes (part of which merchants exported to the treeless provinces of the Russian Empire: Astrakhan, Tsaritsyn, and others). Each year, the residents of Ardatov and the nearby villages produced up to one million pairs of bast shoes. Other crafts included the production of turned wooden dishes and printed gingerbread with the inscription "Ardatov" or "Ardatov Gingerbread," as well as special Ardatov varieties of towels and rushniks, and soap made from rendered lard.

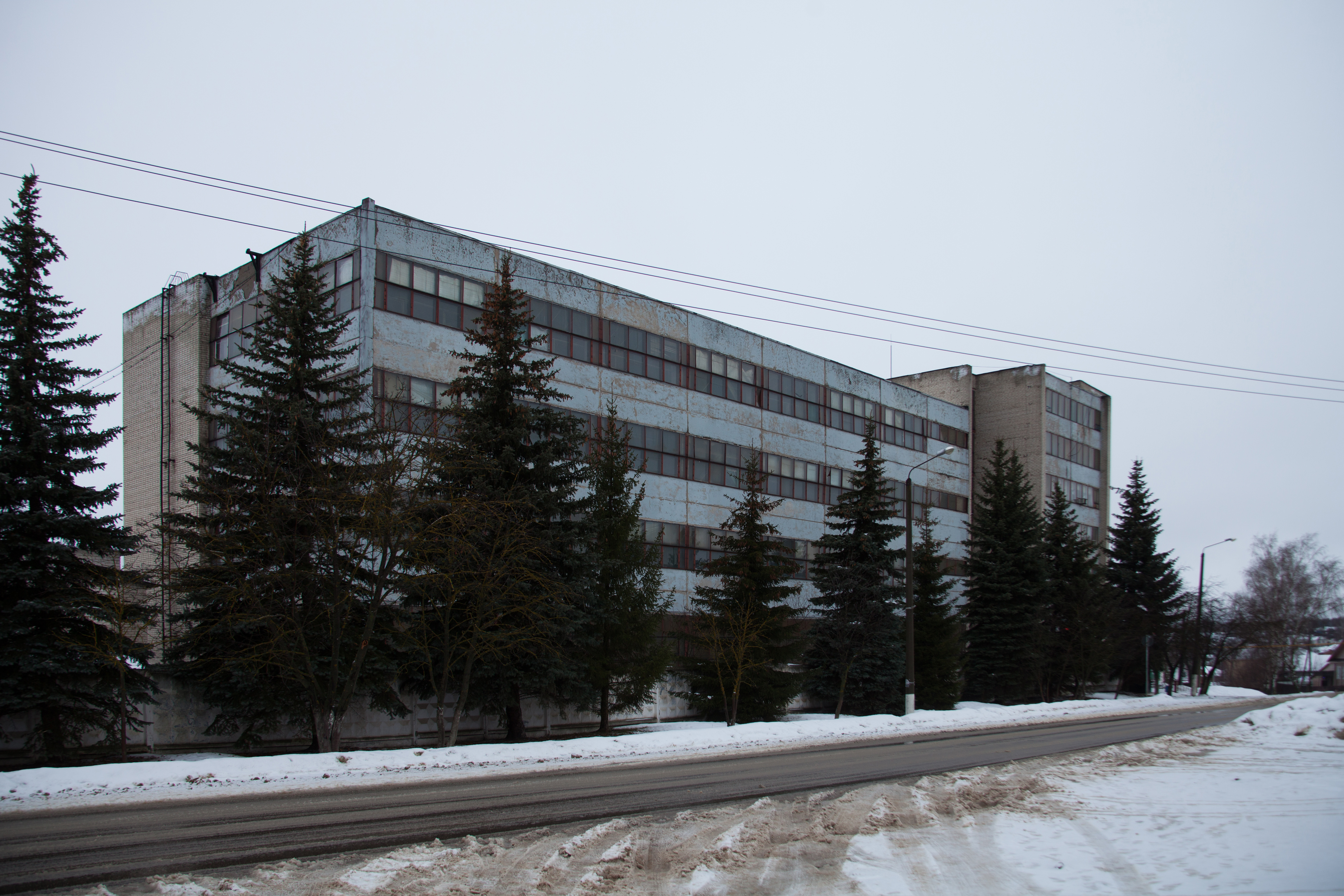
Sapphire plant

During the Soviet era, several industrial enterprises continued to operate in Ardatov, and some new, especially engaged in the processing of agricultural products, opened: a starch factory, a flax processing plant, a bakery, a dairy plant, a brick factory, a printing house, and several woodworking enterprises. In 1934, a machine tractor station, which was later transformed into the enterprise Selkhoztekhnika, opened in Ardatov.

On 14 June 1969, was opened the Ardatov branch of the Moscow military plant Mosdetal, which became the settlement's major employer. In 1972, the enterprise was renamed Sapphire and began producing civilian products — dental handpieces, as well as components for the Gorky Automobile Plant, Pavlovo Bus Factory, and other enterprises. Since 1992, the plant has completely switched to the production of civilian products and manufactures items for dentistry, various parts and components for devices, machines, and mechanisms, as well as custom metal equipment.

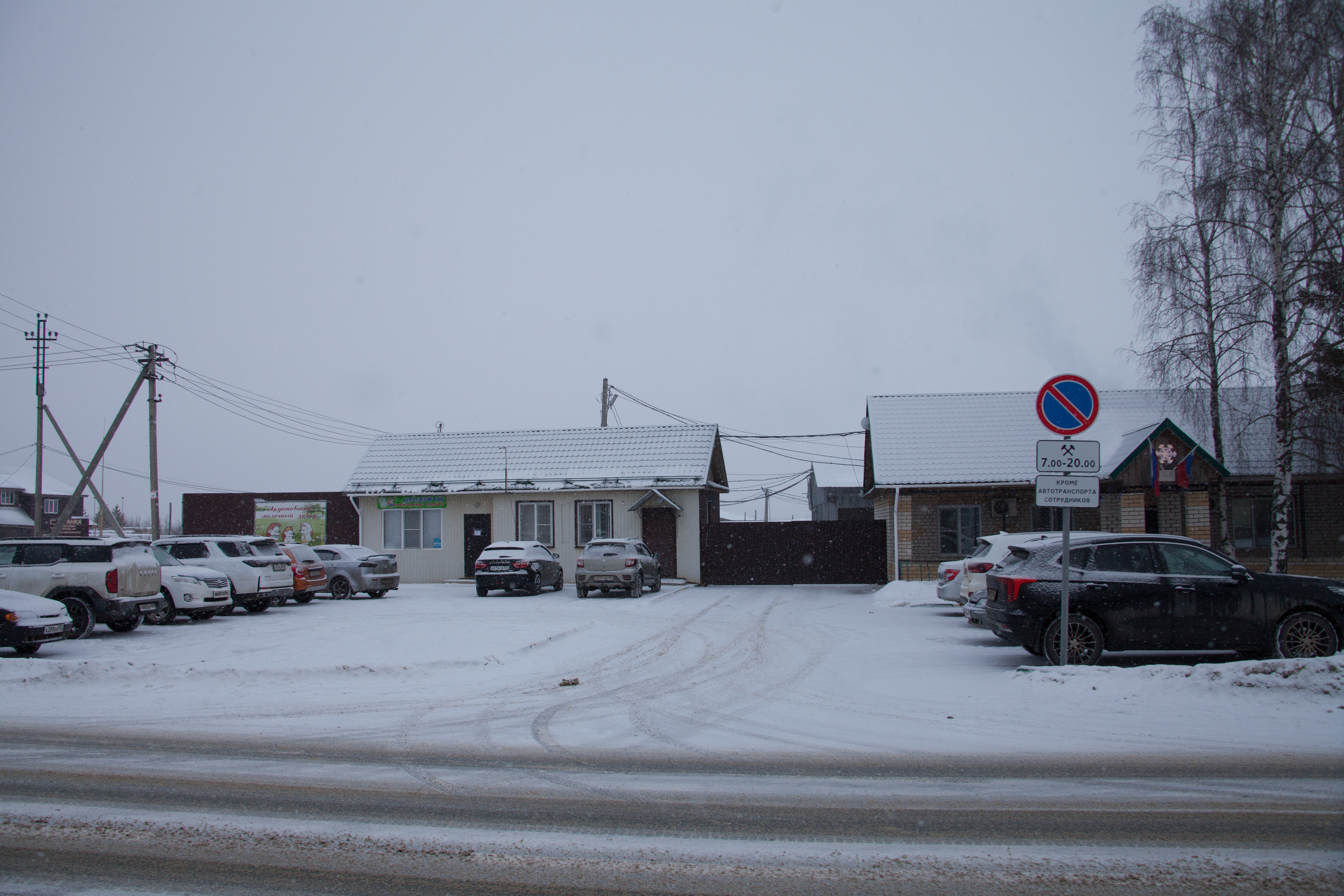
Dairy plant

The following industrial enterprises operate in Ardatov:

- Sapphire — medical instruments and equipment, metalworking
- Ardatov Dairy Plant — butter, cottage cheese, milk
- Ardatov Food Combine — bread and flour confectionery, cakes, and pastries
- Comfort — food
- Drevpromdetal — lumber and beams
- Vesta — metal products

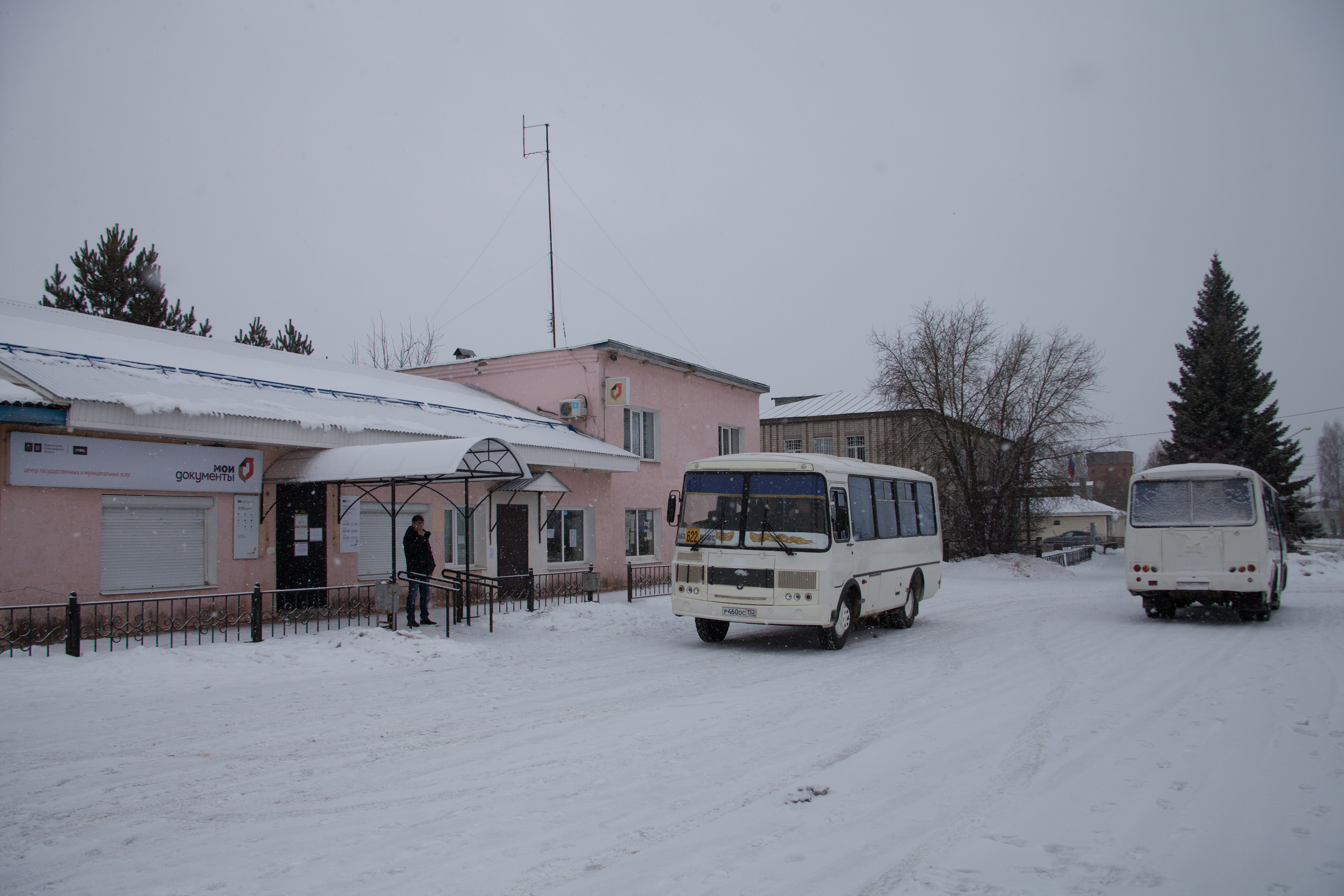
Bus station

=== Transport ===
Ardatov is located far from major navigable rivers, so historically, its communication with the outside world has been conducted overland. Even before the joining of the lands that later became Ardatov to the Russian state, there was a road ("sakma") in these areas that connected the Russian city of Murom with the Tatar Temnikov. In the early 19th century, a postal route was established through Ardatov, connecting the cities of Arzamas and Tambov.

In 1891, railway lines were built to the metallurgical plants in Vyksa and Kulebaki, towns in the Ardatov Uyezd. In 1892, the management of the Moscow—Kazan railway approached the Ardatov zemstvo assembly with a proposal to extend the railway line to Ardatov. The condition was, that the zemstvo assembly had to issue bonds for 360,000 rubles with a yield of 5% per annum. The zemstvo assembly refused, and the Moscow-Kazan railway passed north of Ardatov through the village of Mukhtolovo. This gave a significant boost to its development, while Ardatov remained without a railway.

In April 1920, the Ardatov uyezd executive committee decided to build a railway branch from Arzamas to Ardatov, which was to be connected to the Bryansk—Arzamas line. Ardatov was to be served by the station Totorashevo, which was planned to be built on the right bank of the Sidyaevsky ravine. However, for unknown reasons, the railway was not built, and nowadays the nearest railway station is still, like 100 years ago, Mukhtolovo at approximately 28.5 kilometres (17.7 mi) north from Ardatov.

In the 1930s, a new highway was laid from Kulebaki to Arzamas through the village of Sakony replacing the old road through Turkushi, while the old route fell into disrepair and became a local unpaved road. On 3 August 1938, a bus service was opened on the newly constructed road along the route Ardatov—Mukhtolovo. In June 1973, a new bus station was opened on Lenin Street. As of 2024, buses belonging to various carriers depart from it to Moscow, Nizhny Novgorod, Arzamas, Sarov, and other cities and towns, as well as local (intra-district) route buses.

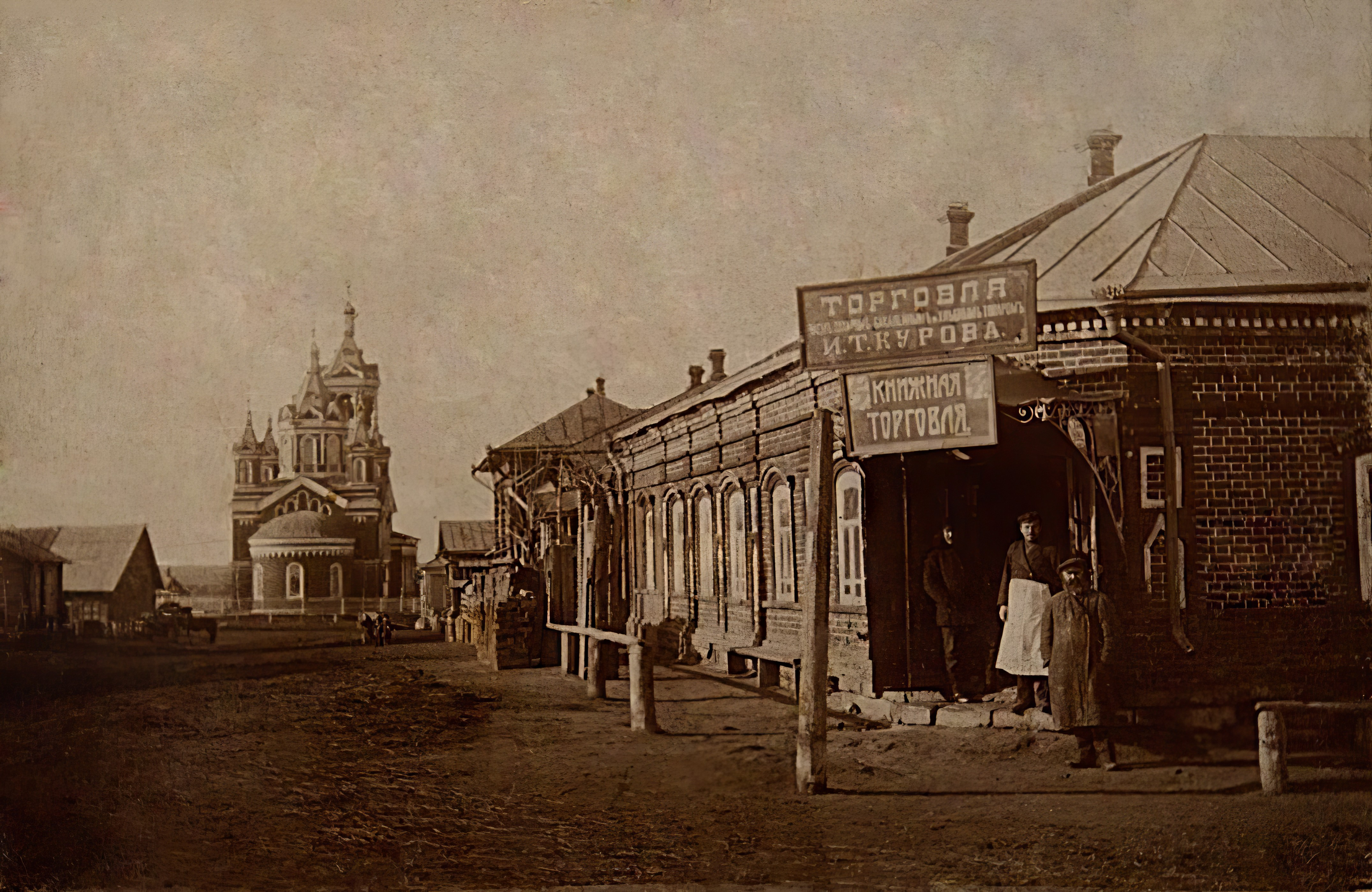
Old Ardatov — a church and a shop

=== Trade ===
The market has historically been the main place of trade in Ardatov. The "Economic Note of the Ardatov District," written for Empress Catherine the Great in 1784, stated:

Among the urban residents, merchants and townspeople trade in this city at fairs, which occur on July 20 and last for one day, as well as weekly on trading days on Wednesdays, with various small peasant goods and food supplies; other goods such as wool, silk, and cotton are delivered from Arzamas and other cities [...] Most townspeople are engaged in agriculture.

A similar description can be found in the "Statistical Description of the Nizhny Novgorod Governorate" dated 1827, which notes the presence of a weekly market in Ardatov, attended only by local residents and peasants from nearby villages and hamlets to engage in the "retail trade of their products." Some development in trade occurred only by the mid-19th century, when, according to the "Memorial Book of the Nizhny Novgorod Governorate for 1855," there were 14 shops with 19 salespeople. Nevertheless, the main venue for the exchange of goods remained, as it had been half a century earlier, the weekly market and the fair with a turnover of about 20,000 rubles held on August 1 [O.S. July 20]. The reforms of Emperor Alexander II in the early 1860s led to a significant revival of trade; over 250 individuals were registered as "merchants" in Ardatov within ten years. Merchant houses with shops appeared on the central streets of Ardatov, some of which still exist and are registered as regional architectural monuments.

However, the main trade still took place at the market and the fair, which was a significant event for the town, its shops occupied Ilyinskaya and Sobornaya squares and all adjacent streets. Nevertheless, it was still a local-scale event, this is why the Brockhaus and Efron Encyclopedic Dictionary, published in 1890, reported in its article about Ardatov: "The city has neither industrial nor commercial significance; the residents are engaged in agriculture."

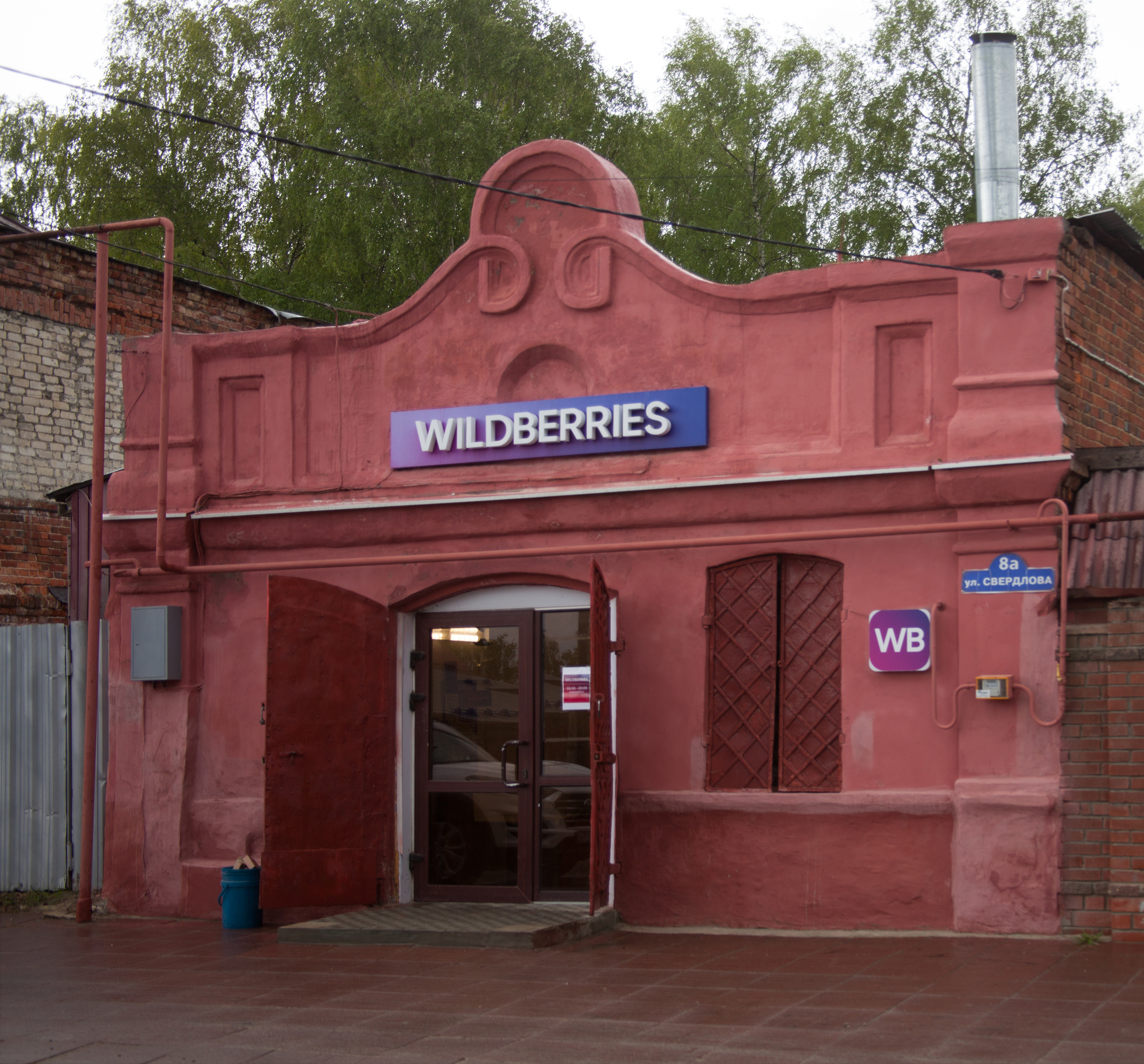
A Wildberries pickup point in an old merchant's shop

After the October Revolution of 1917, all private trade in the city was prohibited, state-owned enterprises occupied former merchant shops. Over time, new trading areas appeared in the settlement, such as the department store on Zuyev Street. Journalist Konstantin Bukovsky, who visited Ardatov in the 1960s, reported the presence of the following trading enterprises: a meat shop, a bakery, a construction store, a household goods store, a second-hand store, two grocery stores, a department store, a cultural goods store, a children's store, a bookstore, as well as a cafeteria and a café. At the same time, Bukovsky noted that the market played a much more significant role for Ardatov, just as it had nearly 200 years earlier. He wrote that the market in those years became not just a local one, as it had been before 1917, but that sellers and buyers came not only from nearby villages and hamlets but even from many other districts and cities: Vyksa, Mukhtolovo, Murom, Pavlovo. According to Bukovsky, a distinctive feature of the Ardatov market was the huge number of livestock (especially piglets), but one could also purchase food products, homemade clothing, and even toys.

After the collapse of the Soviet Union, private trade reemerged in Ardatov. In 1992, the first private store was opened by the future local historian Alexander Bazaev. Subsequently, others appeared, including heirs of pre-revolutionary merchant dynasties of Ardatov — for example, Alexander Polygalin (merchant Yegor Nikiforovich Polygalin is mentioned in 1802 as one of the donors for the construction of the Znamensky Cathedral), who opened a photo store in 1995, and Tatyana Vladimirovna Koroleva, née Zelina (a relative of the famous Ardatov merchant), who established the grocery store "Merkury" in 1996.

As of the end of 2022, there are 127 stores in Ardatov with a total retail area of 11,642.1 square metres (125,315 sq ft), including 7 supermarkets, 27 minimarkets, 11 specialized grocery stores, and 63 specialized non-food stores. The settlement features stores from such retail chains as Avocado, Bristol, Krasnoe & Beloe, Magnit, Magnit Cosmetic, Pyaterochka, and others; as well as pickup points for marketplaces Ozon, Wildberries, and Yandex Market. There are also 11 catering establishments (excluding canteens at educational institutions, offices, and industrial enterprises).

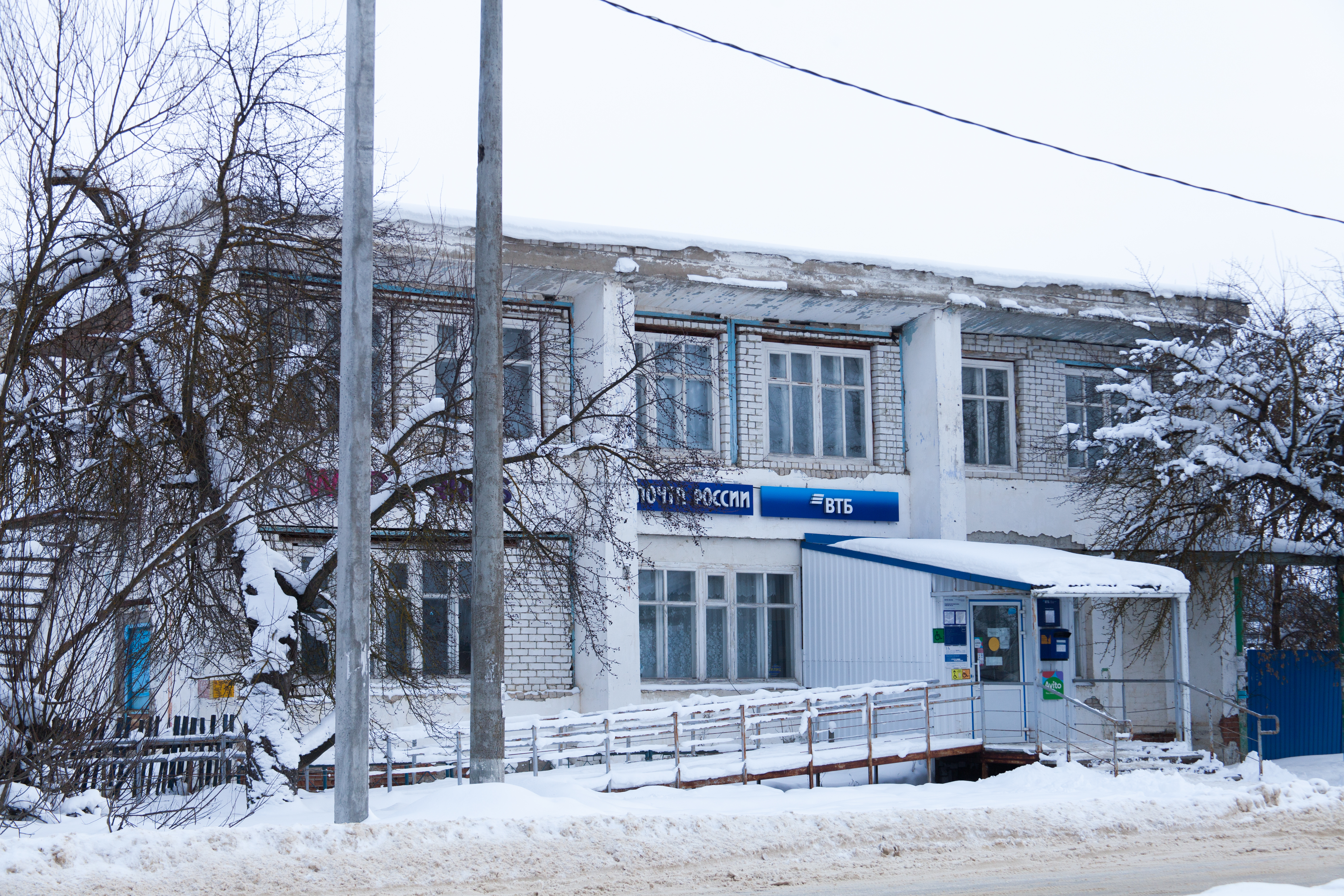
Offices of Russian Post and Post Bank

=== Finance ===
In the late 19th century, banking organizations began to operate in Ardatov — the first was the Peasants' Land Bank, established in 1882. This bank provided loans to peasants for purchasing land — it issued loans for up to 52 years, amounting to 60 to 90% of the land's value. The Ardatov branch of the bank was opened in 1897, and its office was located in the building of the Uyezd Zemstvo Administration. In 1898, the bank issued 33 loans to peasants totaling 341,510 rubles, and in 1899, it issued 42 loans totaling 3,134,600 rubles; by 1901, the number of loans issued in a year increased to 48. Gradually, the number of credit organizations in the city increased; by 1915, branches of the Consumers' Society, the Uyezd Small Credit Office, the Mutual Credit Society, and the Loan and Savings Society were opened in Ardatov. In total, in 1916, there were 20 credit societies and 9 loan and savings offices in the Ardatov Uyezd. The town saw the opening of branches of numerous insurance companies; in 1915, they included Moscow Fire Insurance Society, Northern Insurance Society, Petrograd Insurance Society, Russia, Russian Insurance Society, Russian Transport Society, Salamandra, Second Russian Fire Insurance Society, Volga and Yakor.

After the October Revolution of 1917, the banking system of the Russian Empire that had existed before, was destroyed; already on 14 (27) December 1917, the Bolsheviks who came to power adopted a Decree on the nationalization of banks. During the years of War Communism and the Civil War, the country almost transitioned to a natural economy, and the banking system was completely dismantled. After the proclamation of the New Economic Policy in 1921, the State Bank of the RSFSR was established, which was transformed in 1923 into the State Bank of the USSR. Until 1988, the State Bank remained the only Soviet bank serving enterprises and organizations, while a unified system of Savings Banks was organized for individuals. A similar situation existed in Ardatov — in 1928, the local savings bank had already 568 depositors. In 1983, a new building for the Ardatov branch of the State Bank of the USSR was constructed on Lenin Street. Later, this building housed a settlement and cash center, and as of 2025, it is home to the Ardatov Court.

As of 2025, banking services in Ardatov are poorly developed, with only two banks present in the settlement: Post Bank and Sberbank. There are offices of four insurance companies in the town: Capital Medical Insurance, Ingosstrakh, Rosgosstrakh, Sogaz, as well an office of the Mandatory Health Insurance Fund.

== Social ==
=== Education ===
==== Historical overview ====
The first educational institution in Ardatov was the parish school at the Znamenskaya Church, opened in 1807 for the children of parishioners by priest Piotr Osipov. As of 1900, the following educational institutions were operating in the town:

- Ardatov Parish School for Boys (founded in 1841)
- Ardatov Primary School for Boys (founded in 1879)
- Ardatov Primary School for Girls (founded in 1872)
- Ardatov Zemstvo School for Boys (founded in 1880)
- Ardatov Parish School (founded in 1807)
- Ardatov Parish School for Girls (founded in 1871)
- Ardatov Town 3-Class School (founded in 1816)

In 1934, the Regional Medical Faculty of the Gorky Medical Institute was transferred from Murom to Ardatov, graduating 100 mid-level medical personnel annually.

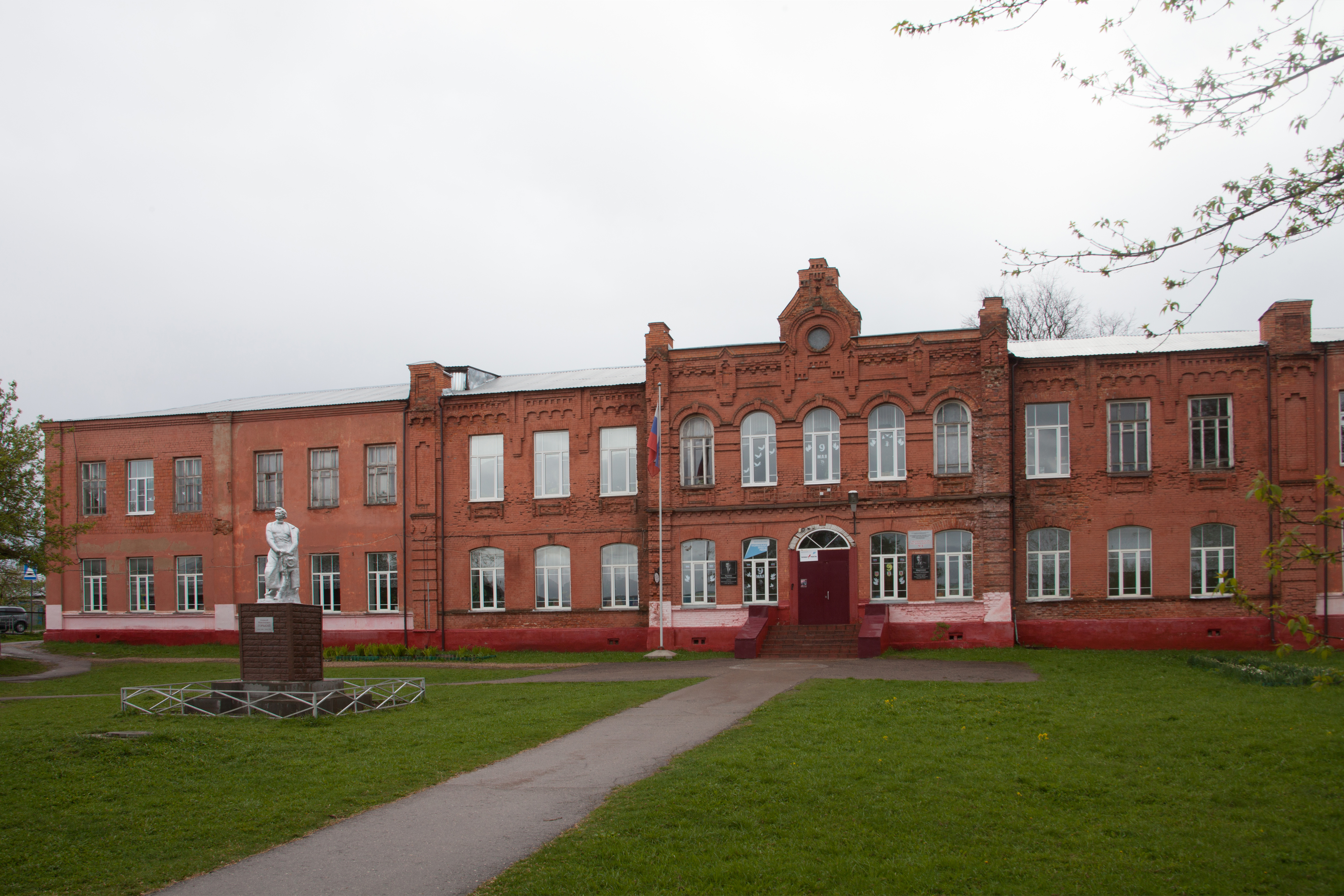
Secondary school No 1

==== Operating educational institutions ====
The following educational institutions are operational in Ardatov:

- Ardatov Agrarian Technical School (2 buildings: 28, 30 Let VLKSM Street, and 48, Lenin Street) with 565 students. It was opened in 1930 under the name Ardatov Agricultural Technical School in the building of the former Zemstvo Assembly. By 1940, the technical school had already graduated 236 agronomists, and 310 students were enrolled. In 1978, the technical school was merged with several farms in the district and transformed into the Ardatov State Farm Technical School. In 2000, it was renamed Ardatov Agrarian Technical School, and since 2005 it is under the jurisdiction of the Ministry of Education and Science.
- Regional Multidisciplinary Technical School (Lenin Street, 75) with 270 students. It was established in 1936 as a mechanization school, located in a former merchant mansion. In 1955, it was merged with a vocational school. Since 1962, it has been known as Rural Vocational Technical School No. 4, from 1976 as Vocational Technical School No. 104, from 1984 as Professional and Technical School No. 104, and in 1986 the school moved to a new building on the outskirts of Ardatov. Since 1994, it has been known as Vocational School No. 104, and since 2012 as Ardatov Commercial and Technical School. In 2014, it was merged with several other educational institutions of the Nizhny Novgorod Oblast to form the Regional Multidisciplinary Technical School.

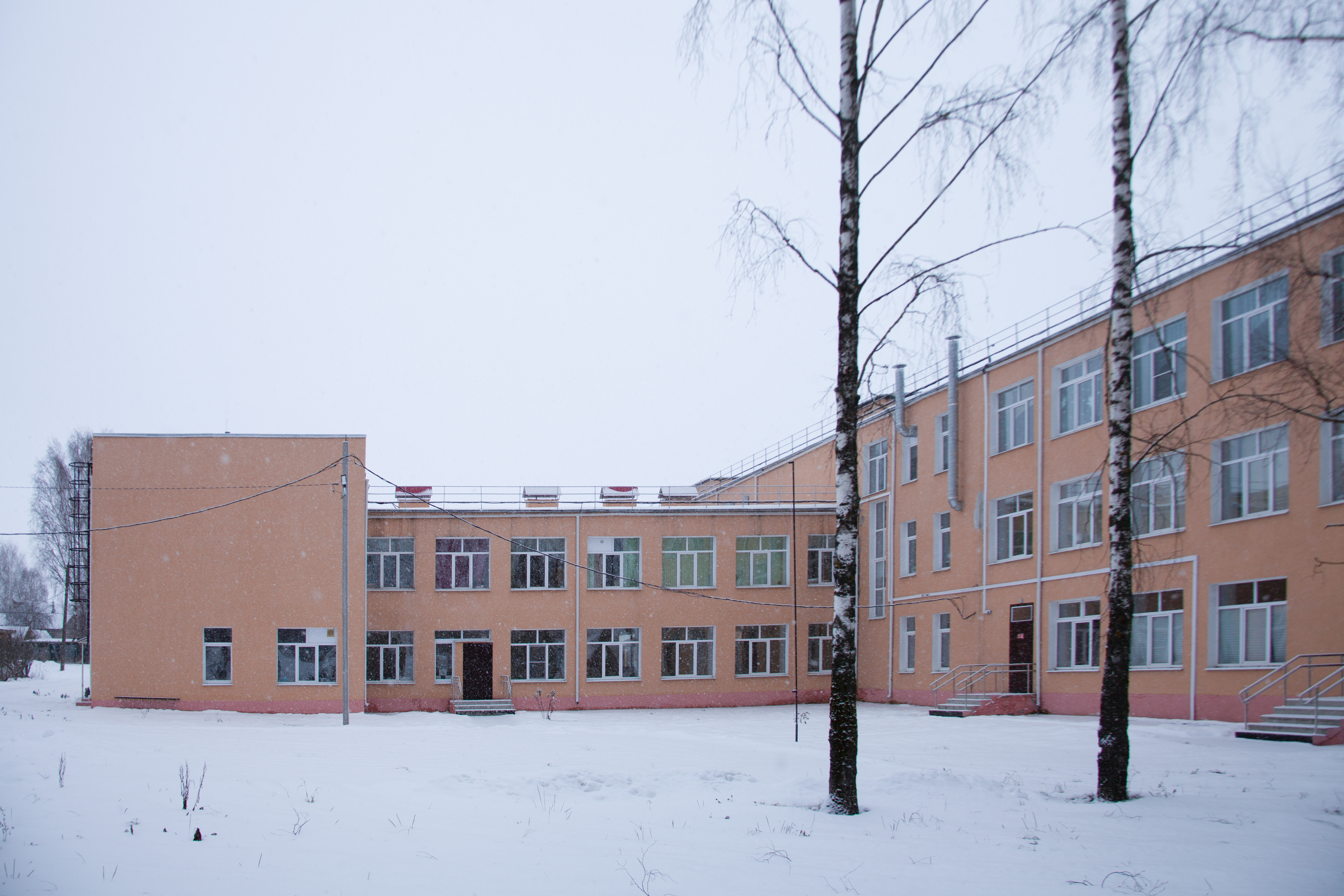
Secondary school No 2

- Two secondary schools:
  - School No. 1 for 844 students (42, Sverdlov Street). The predecessor of the school was the Ardatov Primary School for Girls, opened in 1872 at the initiative of the zemstvo assembly member F. Babenychev, supported by the chairman of the zemstvo assembly Alexander Nikolayevich Karamzin. In 1902, a 2-class school for girls was opened on its basis. From 1906 to 1909, a brick building was constructed for the school, which was transformed into a progymnasium after its completion, and from 1911, it became a gymnasium. In 1921, based on the gymnasium for girls, part of the staff of the gymnasium for boys, and the higher primary school, II level school was established. Since 1935, it was named after the 15th anniversary of the Komsomol, and since 1975, it has been Ardatov School No. 1.
  - School No. 2 (57, Zuyev Street) for 640 students. Founded in 1879 as a 2-year primary school for boys. Initially located in rented premises, a building was constructed for it on Nizhny Novgorod Street (now Sverdlov Street) at the end of the 19th century. In 1921, based on the zemstvo primary school, the male parish 2-class school, and the women's primary school, a level I school was formed. In 1975, a new building was constructed for the school on Zuyev Street. In the early 2000s, the school was named after Semyon Ivanovich Obrazumov, who was its director from 1962 to 1987.
  - In 2024, the construction of a new school building for 700 students began in the Zarechnaya part of the settlement, on Karl Marx Street. The construction is planned to be completed by the end of 2025.
- 4 kindergartens:
  - No. 1 (37, 1 May Street) for 75 places.
  - No. 2 (45, Lenin Street, 45) for 75 places.
  - No. 3 Sunny (1/2, Solnechnaya Street, 1/2) for 90 places.
  - No. 4 Сamomile (6, Pobedy Street, 6) for 205 places.

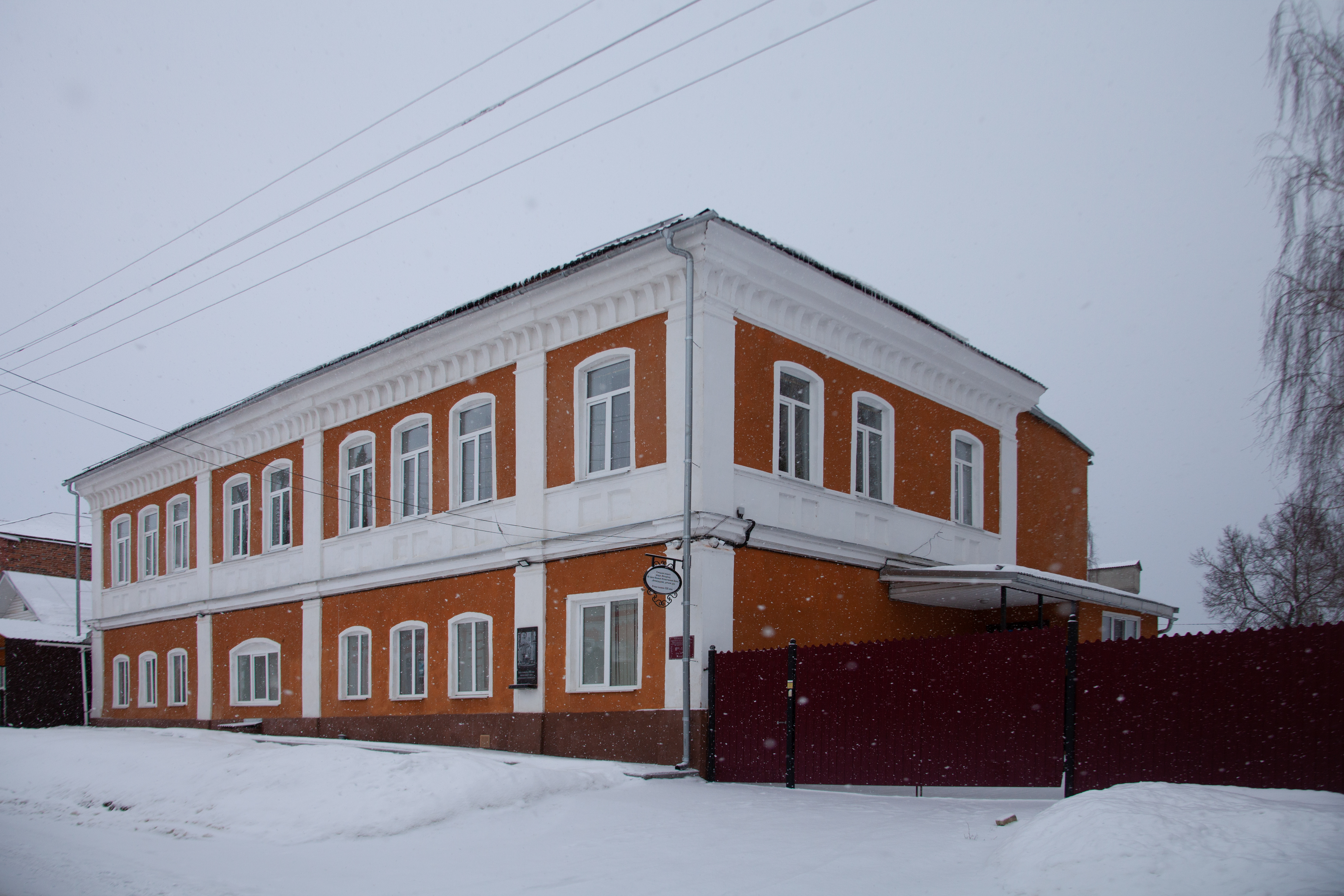
Museum of local history

=== Culture ===
The first theater in the Ardatov Uyezd was founded at the very end of 18th century by Count Nikolay Grigoryevich Shakhovskoy in his estate Yussupovo and was composed of serfs from the estate. In 1798, the theater was moved to Nizhny Novgorod, where it became the first city theater and, after a series of reorganizations, transformed into the existing Nizhny Novgorod Gorky State Academic Drama Theater.

The first theater in Ardatov itself was a musical and dramatic studio established in 1882 in the estate of doctor Gratsianov, which lasted until the 1950s. In summertime, performances were held in a wooden pavilion in the city garden, and in the wintertime on the upper floor of house of merchant Krasheninnikov (current address 21, Lenin Street).

In 1874, a library for rural teachers was opened in Ardatov, and in 1896, a public uyezd library, which received part of the books from the teachers' library.

In the early 1930s, a cinema was opened in the closed Znamensky Cathedral. In 1953, a new building was constructed for the cinema, and it was renamed Zvezda (Star; the current address is 33, 30 Let VLKSM Street). The cinema was closed in the 1990s. In 2013, a new cinema opened in the Rubin sport and recreation center.

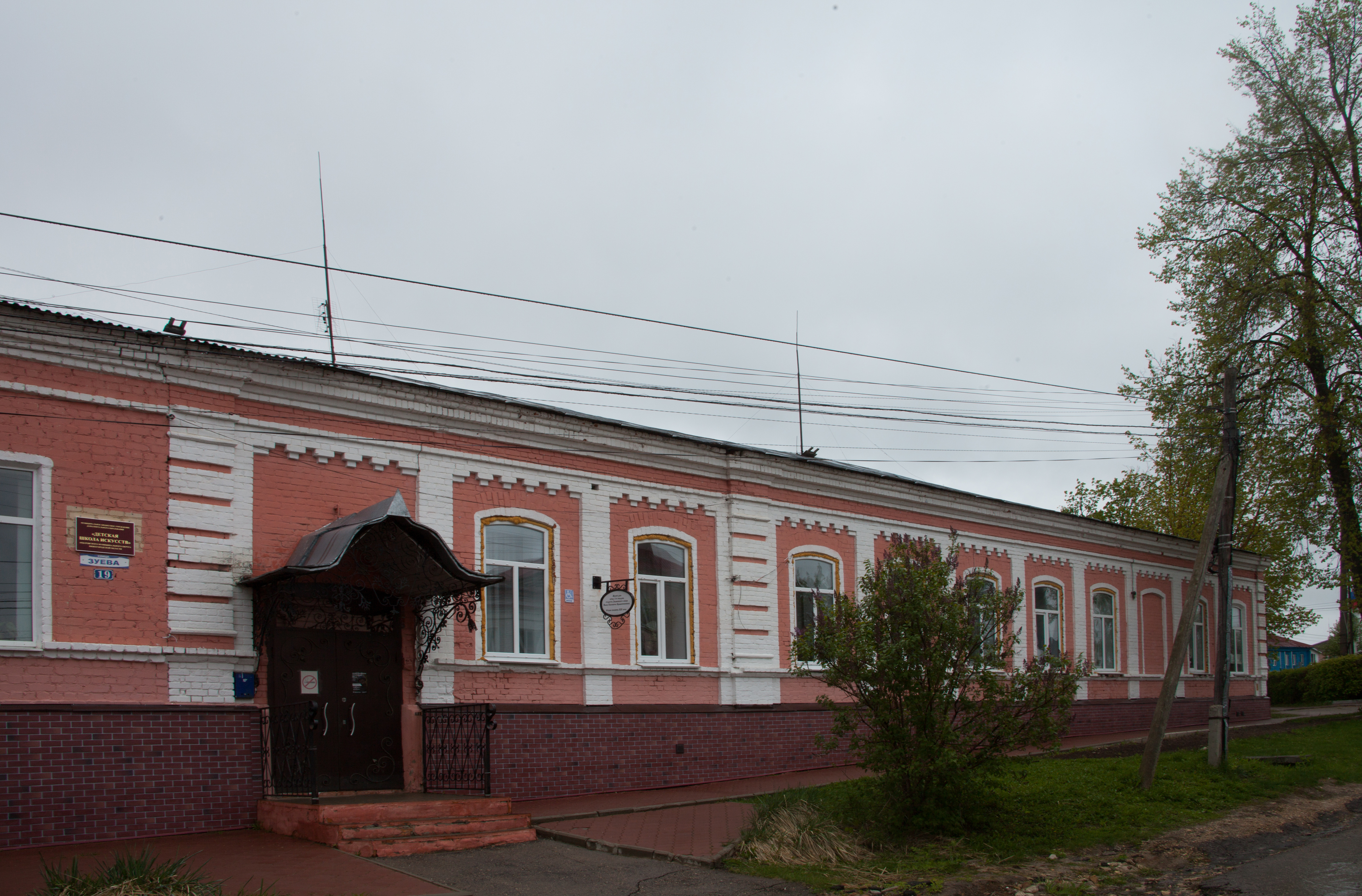
Children's Art School

The following cultural institutions operate in Ardatov:

- Ardatov District House of Culture with 377 seats (35, 30 Let VLKSM Street). A standard building, since 1978.
- Rubin cinema (42, Lenin Street), since 2013
- Central Library (35, Lenin Street), since 1896
- Central Children's Library (35, Lenin Street, 35), since 1949
- Ardatov Museum of Local History (10, Zuyev Street)
- Children's Art School (19, Zuyev Street)

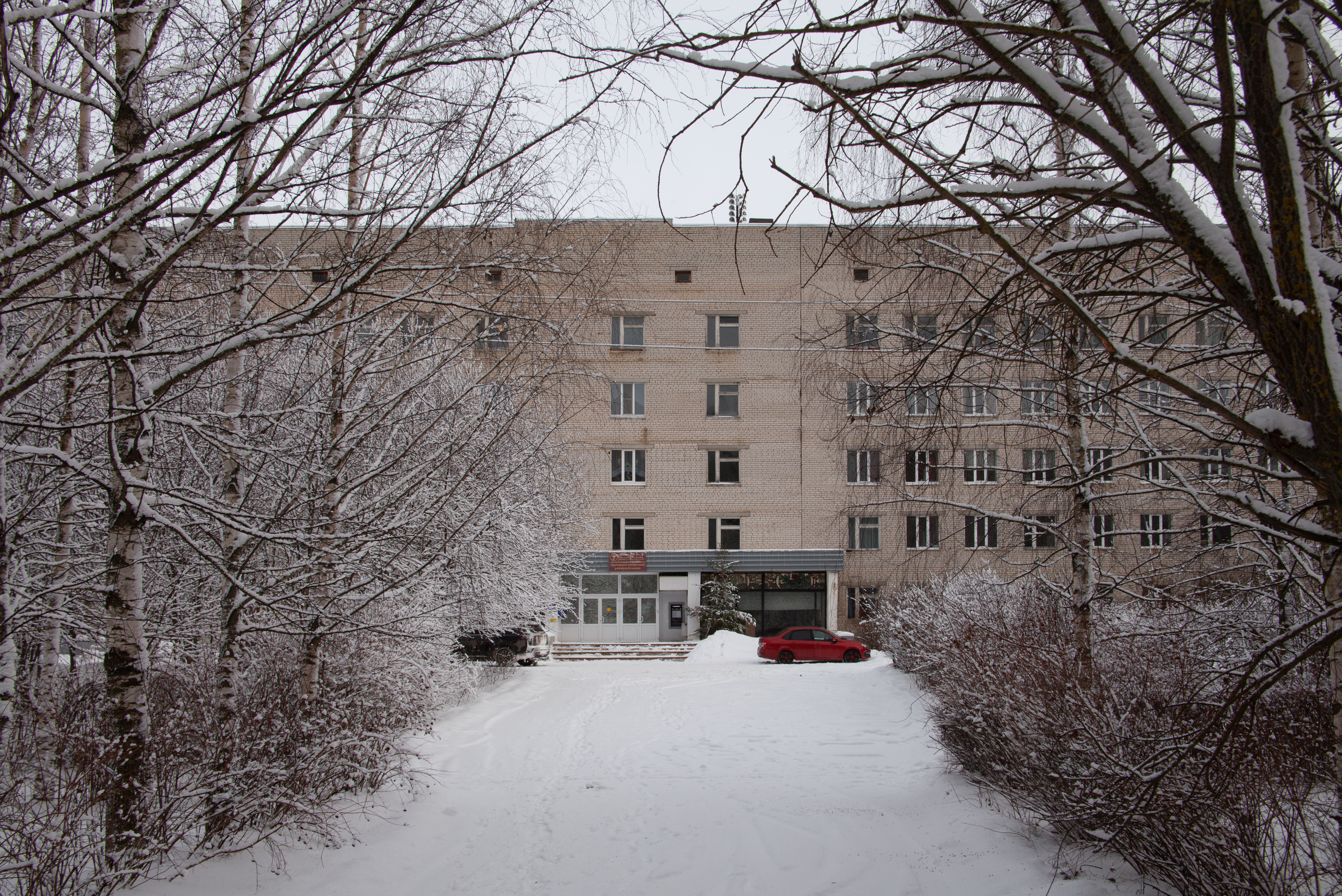
Hospital

=== Healthcare ===
The first mentions of healthcare institutions in Ardatov date back to 1817, when documents noted the existence of a 10-bed hospital, which at that time was the only one in the uyezd (which had a population of about 120,000 people). The development of healthcare began after the Zemstvo reform — in 1864, a 60-bed hospital was opened. In 1883, a zemstvo drug-store was established. As of 1871, there were two doctors in the hospital. According to a description from 1910, the hospital was a two-story building located near the prison fortress. In 1901, an infectious diseases barrack with 6 wards of 10 beds each was additionally built. Furthermore, two infectious departments (male and female) were created in the mezzanines of the main hospital building. The building of the old zemstvo hospital in Ardatov burned down in the 1980s.

In the 1930s, measures for disease prevention were introduced in schools and preschool institutions, and vaccinations became mandatory for children. In 1940, an outpatient clinic was opened, and a new building for the hospital and maternity home was built. From the 1940s to the 1960s, there was active development of healthcare in Ardatov — many specialist doctors appeared, a radiographic machine was purchased in 1949, and the number of beds in the hospital increased to 62 by 1948 and 75 by 1952. From 1986 to 1990, a new hospital complex for 200 beds and a clinic for 600 visits per shift was built in the settlement.

Currently, the village has the following medical institutions:

- Ardatov Central District Hospital (1, Sportivnaya Street) with 200 beds and 600 visits per shift
- Ambulance station with two vehicles
- 8 pharmacies and 2 pharmacy kiosks

=== Mass media ===
Local medias appeared in Ardatov after the October Revolution of 1917. In 1921 several newspapers were published in the town: such as Krasny Vestnik (Red Messenger), Nabat (Alarm Bell), Biletazh, and Krasny Pakhar (Red Plougher) were published in the town. In 1930, the newspaper Kolhoznaya Pravda (Collective Farm Truth) was founded, which had the subtitle "Organ of the Ardatov District Committee of the VKP(b) RIK and the District Trade Union." In 1963, the newspaper's name changed to "Znamya Pobedy" (Standard of the Victory), and in 1991 to Nasha Zhizn (Our Life). As of 2024, the founder of the newspaper is the administration of the Ardatov Municipal District.

=== Sports ===
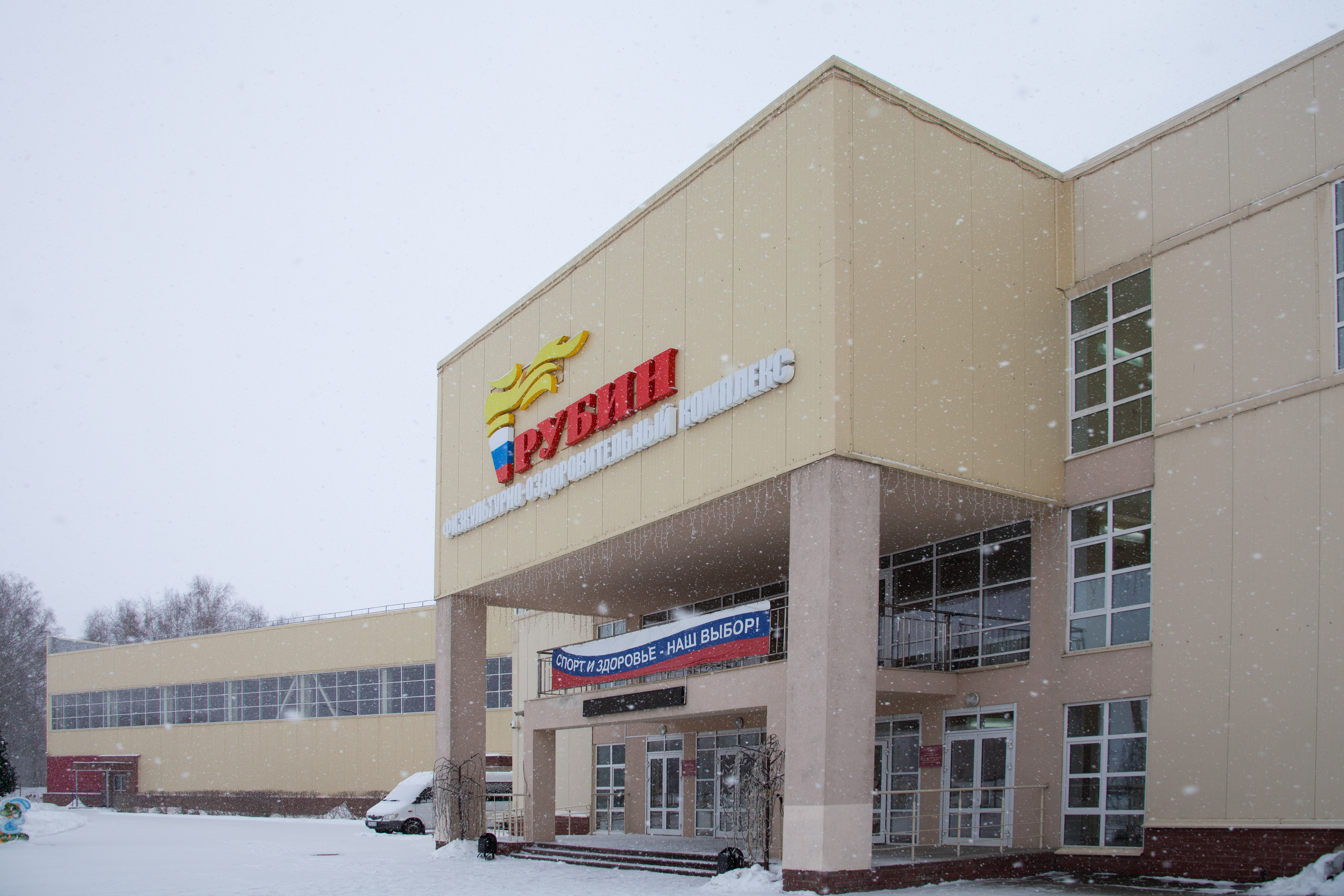
Rubin sport and recreation center

In the 1930s, Komsomol members organized a football team in Ardatov and built a football field in the park. Ardatov footballers participated in local tournaments, competing with teams from Arzamas, Kulebaki, and Stioksovo. In the second half of the 1950s, a football stadium was built, and the local team participated in the championships of the Nizhny Novgorod Oblast. In 1990, the team Rubin was founded (since 2014 Rubin-Arzamas-D), which participated to the championships and cups of the Nizhny Novgorod Oblast, but never achieved high results. However one of the players of the Ardatov team, Oleg Pergayev, later became a professional football player: he played for the Kazakh team FC Aktobe in the Kazakhstan Premier League.

The Ardatov hockey team Rubin achieved much greater success: in 2017, the junior team born in 2004/2005 won the Golden Puck tournament of the Nizhny Novgorod Oblast and went to the all-Russian competitions in Sochi, where they took last place in their group and could not continue the competition. In 2024, at the Nizhny Novgorod Oblast championship among boys born in 2013/2014, Ardatov's Rubin took second place.

Ardatov also has amateur teams in some other sports, participating in regional, inter-district, and district championships — for example, futsal and table tennis teams.

The main sports facility in Ardatov is the sport and recreation center Rubin (42, Lenin Street), opened in 2013. The complex consists of three blocks: the first houses an ice arena, the second includes two swimming pools, a general physical training hall, a table tennis hall, a fitness hall, a martial arts hall, a gym, as well as a cinema, and the third contains a universal sports hall. Next to the physical culture and health complex is an open football field.

In addition to the sport and recreation center, there are other sports facilities in the settlement:

- A children's and youth sports school (65, Lenin Street), which has 280 students
- A sports ground and sports hall at school No. 1
- A sports ground and sports hall at school No. 2
- A hockey box in the Susslov microdistrict in the southern part of Ardatov
- A hockey box in the Zarechnaya part in the north of Ardatov

=== Religion ===
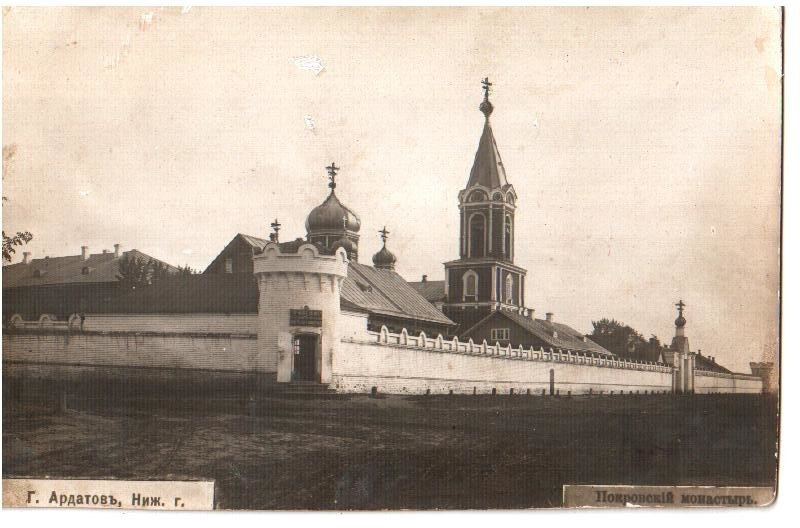
Pokrovsky Nunnery in the beginning of 20th century

==== Perished churches ====
- The first wooden Orthodox church in honor of the Sign of the Most Holy Theotokos (Znamenskaya) was built in the Zarechnaya part of Ardatov no later than 1610. In 1810, it is mentioned as "dilapidated," and nothing has survived from it.
- Pokrovsky Nunnery was transformed on 13 May [O.S. 1 May] 1861, from an existing women's religious community that had been in place since 1808. By the beginning of the 20th century, the monastery included 3 churches:
  - a five-domed cathedral in honor of the Protection of the Most Holy Theotokos with a bell tower;
  - a church in honor of Saint Demetrius of Thessalonica and the Holy Martyr Stephen the New;
  - a church at the hospital building in honor of the Vladimir Icon of the Mother of God. In 1928, the monastery was closed, and in 1931, the Pokrovsky Cathedral was blown up; the other churches and buildings gradually fell into ruin. Since 2011, the territory of the former monastery has housed a women's correctional colony.
- The Alexander-Joseph Church, wooden, single-altared, was built as a temporary structure in 1868 and belonged to the Ilyinskaya Church.
- The Pokrov Church at the zemstvo hospital was built in 1870 and was destroyed during the Soviet era.
- The church in honor of the Holy Martyrs Adrian and Natalia at the prison castle was destroyed during the Soviet era.

==== Existing churches ====
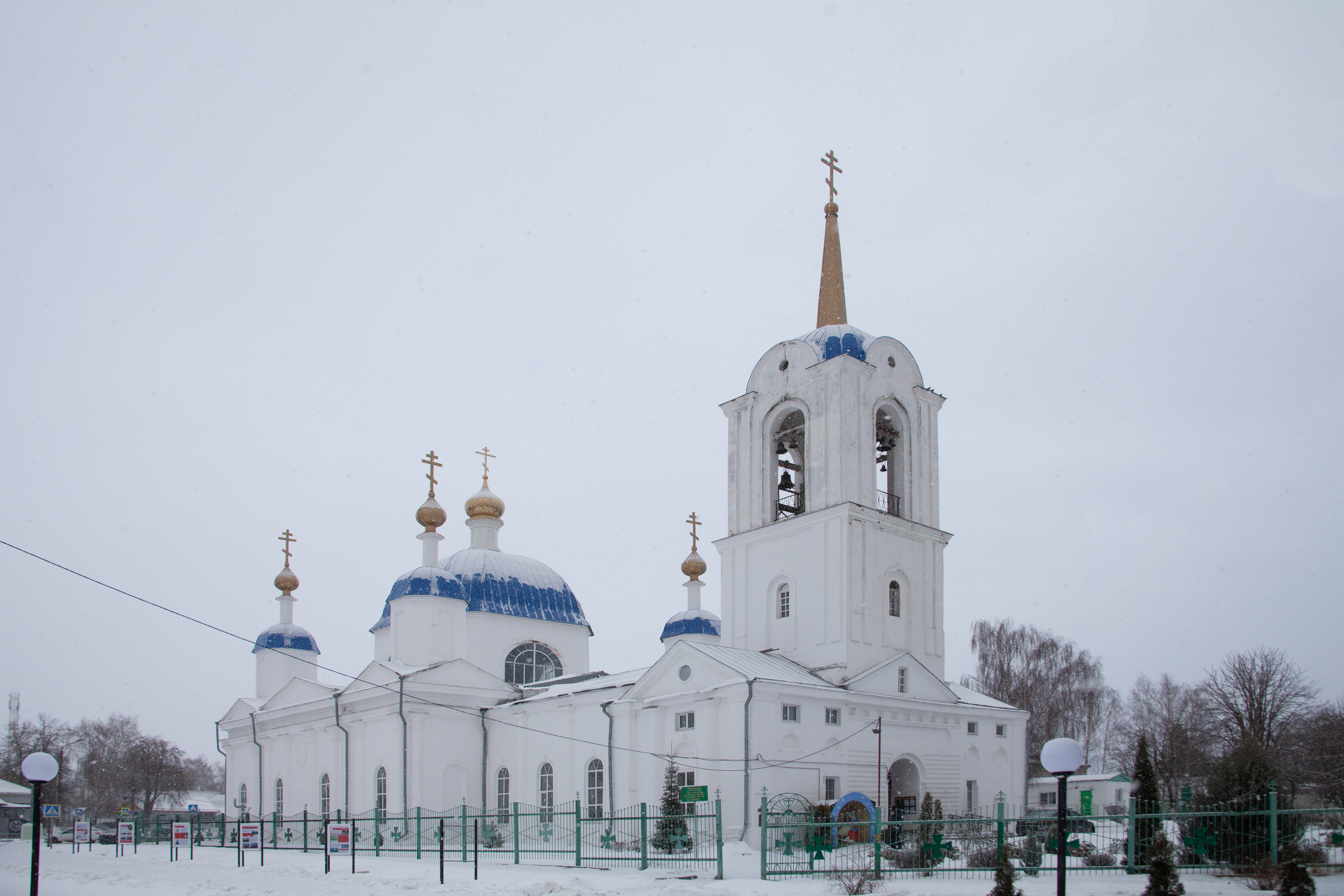
Znamensky Cathedral

Since 15 March 2012, Ardatov has been the center of the Ardatov Deanery of the Vyksa Diocese of the Russian Orthodox Church. The following churches are located in the settlement:

- Znamensky Cathedral, stone (16, Lenin Street). The building on the site of a previously existing church (likely wooden) began in 1795 and was completed in 1802. Initially called the church in honor of the Icon of Our Lady of the Sign, it became a cathedral in 1851. It was closed in 1925 and was first used as a cinema, and then as a workshop for the Sapphire factory On 20 July 1993, it was registered as a regional architectural monument. In 1994, the cathedral was returned to the property of the Russian Orthodox Church and gradually restored
- Ilyinskaya Church, stone (1, October Square). The wooden Ilyinskaya Church is mentioned in 1819 as the "Ilyinskaya or Napolnaya" non-parish church, which, like most of the city, was destroyed in a fire on 3 December [O.S. 21 November] 1837. The modern stone building began construction in 1876, and as of 1888, it was still not completed. It was closed in 1933. On 20 July 1993, it was registered as a regional architectural monument, but as of beginning of 2025, it remains on the territory of the Sapphire factory and is in a semi-ruined state.
- Skorbiaschensksya Church, stone (15, Soviet Street). Built in 1829 on the old cemetery of Ardatov, it was closed in 1921, and the building was used as a warehouse. On 20 July 1993, it was registered as a regional architectural monument. Restoration began in the late 2010s.
- Pokrovskaya Church, stone (45, 30 Let VLKSM Street). Built in 2008 on the territory of the former Pokrovsky Nunnery, now used as Correctional Colony No. 18 of the Federal Penitentiary Service of Russia for the Nizhny Novgorod Oblast.
- Chapel of John the Warrior, wooden (Lenin Street, no number). Built in 2013.

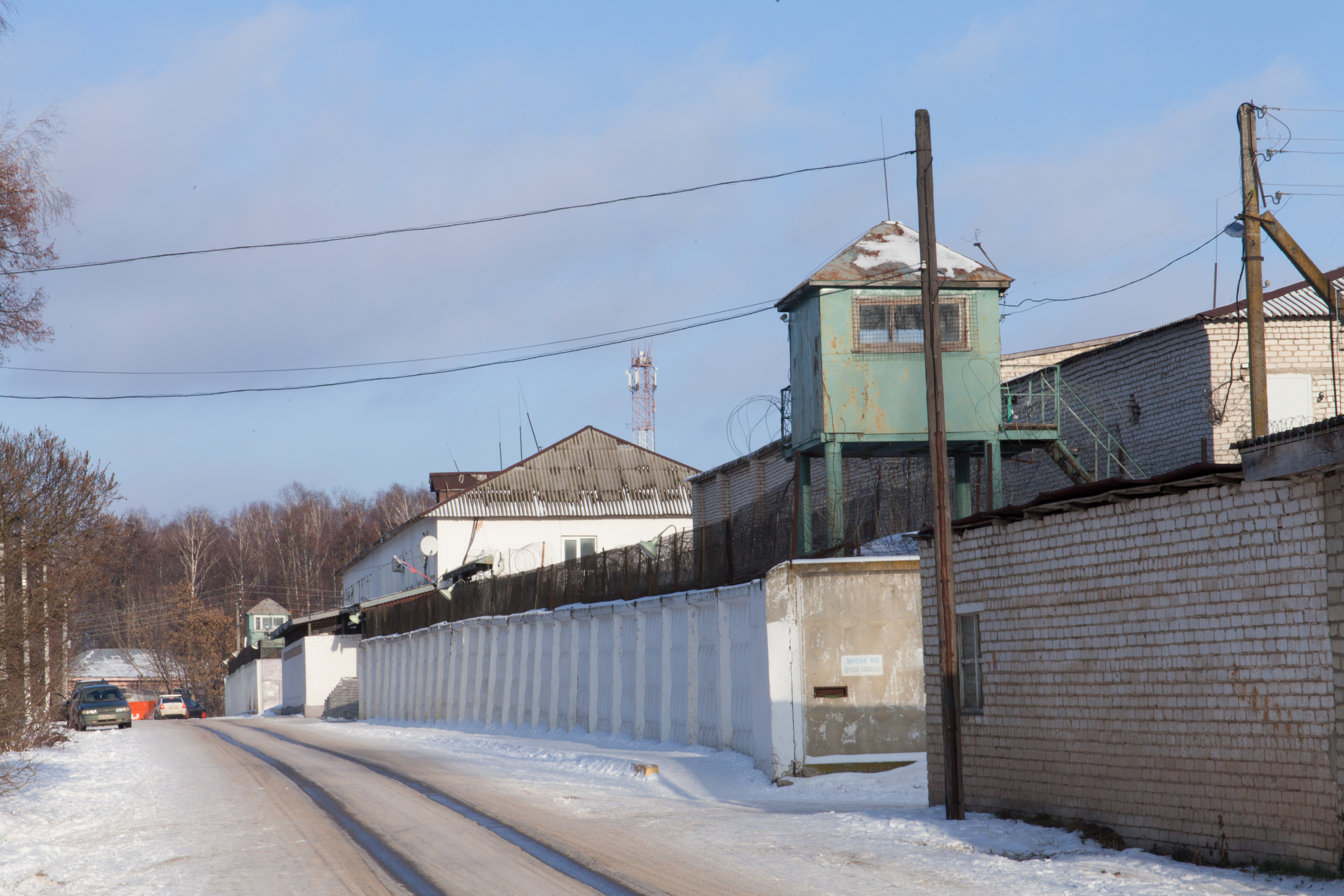
Women's correctional colony on the site of the former Pokrovsky Nunnery

=== Penitentiary institutions ===
- Former prison building (32, Lenina Street). After Ardatov received the status of a district town in 1779, a wooden "prison castle" was built there. In 1856—1858, a stone district prison was built according to the project of Afanasy Ermilovich Turmyshev. The building still exists and is used as part of the campus of the Ardatov Agricultural College. On 20 July 1993, the former district prison building was registered as a regional architectural monument.
- Women's correctional colony (45, 30 Let VLKSM Street). After the closure of the Pokrovsky Monastery in 1928, various organizations were housed in its buildings. Since 1943, they have been used to accommodate penitentiary institutions. Until 2011, there was a correctional labor colony for minors, followed by correctional colony No. 18 of the Main Directorate of the Federal Penitentiary Service of Russia for the Nizhny Novgorod Oblast. According to a 2014 plan, the colony was to be relocated to another site, and the remaining buildings of the monastery were to be restored, but as of beginning of 2025, this has not been done.

=== Other ===
In addition to the above, there are the following social institutions in Ardatov:

- House of Mercy (Nursing home for the elderly and disabled; 30, Lenin Street).
- Social rehabilitation center for minors (10, Zuyev Street).

== Works cited ==
- "Описаніе Города Ардатова". Экономическое примѣчаніе Ардатовскаго уѣзда (in Russian). 1784. pp. 1–2.
- Списокъ населенныхъ мѣстъ по свѣдѣніямъ 1859 года (in Russian). Vol. XXV. Нижегородская губернія. Санктпетербургъ: Центральный статистическій комитетъ Министерства внутреннихъ дѣлъ. 1863.
- Статистический справочник по Нижегородской области (in Russian). Нижний-Новгород: Издание Нижегородского губстатотдела. 1929.
- Схема территориального планирования Ардатовского района Нижегородской области (in Russian). Vol. 2. Нижний Новгород: Земля и город. 2013.
- Энциклопедическій словарь, составленный русскими учёными и литераторами (in Russian). Vol. 5. Антр—Аθ. Санктпетербургъ: Типографія И. И. Глазунова. 1862.
- Базаев, Александр (2004). "Ардатов". Исторические сведения о селениях Ардатовского района (in Russian). Арзамас: АГПИ. ISBN 5-86517-194-1.
- Базаев, Александр (2006). Реабилитированы посмертно: Книга памяти жертв политических репрессий в Ардатовском районе Нижегородской области (in Russian). Арзамас: АГПИ. ISBN 5-86517-277-8.
- Базаев, Александр (2014). История Ардатова в событиях и лицах (in Russian). Арзамас: Арзамасская типография. ISBN 978-5-9927-0097-8.
- Буковский, Константин (1965). "Малые города". Новый мир (in Russian). No. 8. Москва. pp. 188–206.
- Векшина, О. А., ed. (2022). Календарь знаменательных и памятных дат Ардатовского района на 2023 год (in Russian). Ардатов: Межпоселенческая библиотечная система Ардатовского муниципального района Нижегородской области.
- Векшина, О. А., ed. (2023). Календарь знаменательных и памятных дат Ардатовского района на 2024 год (in Russian). Ардатов: Межпоселенческая библиотечная система Ардатовского муниципального района Нижегородской области.
- Гладкова, Л. В.; Седов, Ал. В., eds. (2000). Ардатовский край: Прошлое и настоящее. Крестьянская летопись Нижегородской земли (in Russian). Нижний Новгород: Нижполиграф. ISBN 5-934 13-004-8.
- Дударев, В. А.; Евсеева, Н. А., eds. (1980). СССР. Административно-территориальное деление союзных республик на 1 января 1980 года (in Russian). Москва: Известия.
- Калинина, В. И.; Балакина, А. В. (2015). "Мониторинг территории р. п. Ардатов Нижегородской области". In Лапшин, А. А. (ed.). 17-й Международный научно-промышленный форум «Великие реки 2015: труды научного конгресса (in Russian). Vol. 1. Нижний Новгород: Нижегородский государстенный архитектурно-строительный университет. pp. 527–531. ISBN 978-5-528-00056-5.
- Коган, Н. В.; Поляков, В. Ф. (1998). Край родной. Между Мокшей и Тёшей (in Russian). Нижний Новгород: Литера. ISBN 5-900915-20-4.
- Комкова, Т. В., ed. (2022). Храмы Ардатовского благочиния (in Russian). Ардатов: Центральная библиотека.
- Кривицын, Е. В.; Базаев, А. В., eds. (2002). Знаменитые люди Ардатовского края XVI—XXI веков. Биографический словарь-справочник (in Russian). Арзамас: АГПИ. ISBN 5-86517-118-6.
- Кузнецов, Н. В., ed. (1974). Природа Горьковской области (in Russian). Горький: Волго-Вятское книжное издательство.
- Куприянова, Н. И., ed. (1984). Административно-территориальное деление и органы власти Нижегородского края — Горьковской области (1929—1979): Справочник (in Russian). Горький: Волго-Вятское книжное издательство.
- Малышев, Александр (2018). По царской Сакме (in Russian). Москва: Эдитус. ISBN 978-5-00058-796-6.
- Малышев, Александр (2023). Как Тёша стала русской рекой. Очерки истории и топонимики Окско-Сурского междуречья (in Russian). Москва: Эдитус. ISBN 978-5-00149-965-7.
- Молоков, А. В.; Кауркин, Р. В., eds. (2017). Книга памяти нижегородцев – нижних чинов российской армии и флота, убитых, умерших, пропавших без вести в годы Первой мировой войны (in Russian). Vol. 1 (2nd, revised and adjusted ed.). Нижний Новгород: Деком. ISBN 978-5-89533-380-8.
- Молоков, А. В.; Кауркин, Р. В., eds. (2018). Нижегородцы – кавалеры Георгиевского креста Великой войны (in Russian). Vol. 1. Нижний Новгород: Деком. ISBN 978-5-89533-415-7.
- Морохин, Николай (1997). Нижегородский топонимический словарь (in Russian). Нижний Новгород: КиТиздат. ISBN 5-88022-052-4.
- Морохин, Николай; Арзамасов, Алексей (2014). Наши реки, города и сёла (in Russian) (2nd, revised and updated ed.). Нижний Новгород: Книги. ISBN 978-5-94 706-160-4.
- Пестовъ, М. П. (1869). Описаніе Ардатовскаго уѣзда Нижегородской губерніи (in Russian). Нижній-Новгородъ: Типографія нижегородскаго губернскаго правленія.
- Поспелов, Евгений (2000). Историко-топонимический словарь России. Досоветский период (in Russian). Москва: Профиздат. ISBN 5-255-01343-9.
- Снѣжицкій, А., ed. (1888). Адресъ-календарь Нижегородской епархіи (in Russian). Нижній-Новгородъ: Типографія Губернскаго Правленія.
- Фадеев, В. Л., ed. (1981). Памятники истории и культуры Горьковской области (in Russian) (2nd, revised ed.). Горький: Волго-Вятское книжное издательство.
- Фартунин, Ю. И., ed. (1978). "Колхозная правда". Газеты СССР. 1917—1960 (in Russian). Vol. 3. К—О (Краевые, губернские, областные, окружные, уездные, районные, городские, транспортные, военные и другие газеты). Москва: Книга.
