= Administrative divisions of Nizhny Novgorod Oblast =

Nizhny Novgorod Oblast Russia
- Administrative center: Nizhny Novgorod

Administrative structure (as of 2014)
- Districts: 43
- Cities/towns: 28
- Urban-type settlements: 55
- Selsovets: 331

Municipal structure (as of 2002)
- Rural settlements: 4,853 (inhabited); 426 (uninhabited)

Nizhny Novgorod Oblast is a federal subject of Russia.

== Administrative and municipal divisions ==
Map

Division		Structure		OKATO	OKTMO	Urban-type settlement/ resort settlement/district-level town*	Rural (selsovet)
Division		Administrative	Municipal	OKATO	OKTMO	Urban-type settlement/ resort settlement/district-level town*	Rural (selsovet)
Sarov (Саров)		city (ZATO)	urban okrug	22 503	22 704		
Nizhny Novgorod (Нижний Новгород)		city	urban okrug	22 401	22 701	Zelyony Gorod (Зелёный Город) resort settlement*	
↳	Avtozavodsky (Автозаводский)	(under Nizhny Novgorod)	—N/a	22 401	—N/a		
↳	Kanavinsky (Канавинский)	(under Nizhny Novgorod)	—N/a	22 401	—N/a		
↳	Leninsky (Ленинский)	(under Nizhny Novgorod)	—N/a	22 401	—N/a		
↳	Moskovsky (Московский)	(under Nizhny Novgorod)	—N/a	22 401	—N/a		1
↳	Nizhegorodsky (Нижегородский)	(under Nizhny Novgorod)	—N/a	22 401	—N/a		
↳	Prioksky (Приокский)	(under Nizhny Novgorod)	—N/a	22 401	—N/a		
↳	Sormovsky (Сормовский)	(under Nizhny Novgorod)	—N/a	22 401	—N/a		
↳	Sovetsky (Советский)	(under Nizhny Novgorod)	—N/a	22 401	—N/a		
Arzamas (Арзамас)		city	urban okrug	22 403	22 703		
Bor (Бор)		city	urban okrug	22 412	22 712		8
Dzerzhinsk (Дзержинск)		city	urban okrug	22 421	22 721	Gavrilovka (Гавриловка); Gorbatovka (Горбатовка); Zhyolnino (Жёлнино)	2
Pervomaysk (Первомайск)		city	urban okrug	22 434	22 734	Satis (Сатис)	
Semyonov (Семёнов)		city	urban okrug	22 437	22 737	Sukhobezvodnoye (Сухобезводное)	11
Kulebaki (Кулебаки)		city	urban okrug	22 238	22 638	Gremyachevo (Гремячево); Veletma (Велетьма)	4
Navashino (Навашино)		city	urban okrug	22 241	22 641		4
Perevoz (Перевоз)		city	urban okrug	22 244	22 644		7
Chkalovsk (Чкаловск)		city	urban okrug	22 255	22 655		6
Shakhunya (Шахунья)		city	urban okrug	22 258	22 758	Vakhtan (Вахтан); Syava (Сява)	5
Vyksa (Выкса)		city	urban okrug	22 415	22 715	Blizhne-Pesochnoye (Ближне-Песочное); Doschatoye (Досчатое); Shimorskoye (Шиморское); Vilya (Виля)	2
Ardatovsky (Ардатовский)		district		22 202	22 602	Ardatov (Ардатов); Mukhtolovo (Мухтолово)	7
Arzamassky (Арзамасский)		district		22 203	22 603	Vyezdnoye (Выездное)	12
Balakhninsky (Балахнинский)		district		22 205	22 605	Balakhna (Балахна) town*; Bolshoye Kozino (Большое Козино); Gidrotorf (Гидроторф); Lukino (Лукино); Maloye Kozino (Малое Козино); Pervoye Maya (Первое Мая)	3
Bogorodsky (Богородский)		district		22 207	22 607	Bogorodsk (Богородск) town*	7
Bolsheboldinsky (Большеболдинский)		district		22 209	22 609		6
Bolshemurashkinsky (Большемурашкинский)		district		22 210	22 610	Bolshoye Murashkino (Большое Мурашкино)	3
Buturlinsky (Бутурлинский)		district		22 212	22 612	Buturlino (Бутурлино)	5
Vadsky (Вадский)		district		22 214	22 614		6
Varnavinsky (Варнавинский)		district		22 215	22 615	Varnavino (Варнавино)	5
Vachsky (Вачский)		district		22 217	22 617	Vacha (Вача)	5
Vetluzhsky (Ветлужский)		district		22 218	22 618	Vetluga (Ветлуга) town*; imeni M. I. Kalinina	7
Voznesensky (Вознесенский)		district		22 219	22 619	Voznesenskoye (Вознесенское)	8
Vorotynsky (Воротынский)		district	urban okrug	22 221	22 621	Vasilsursk (Васильсурск); Vorotynets (Воротынец)	9
Voskresensky (Воскресенский)		district		22 222	22 622	Voskresenskoye (Воскресенское)	10
Gaginsky (Гагинский)		district		22 226	22 626		6
Gorodetsky (Городецкий)		district		22 228	22 628	Gorodets (Городец) town*; Zavolzhye (Заволжье) town*; Pervomaysky (Первомайский)	9
Dalnekonstantinovsky (Дальнеконстантиновский)		district		22 230	22 630	Dalneye Konstantinovo (Дальнее Константиново)	9
Volodarsky (Володарский)		district		22 231	22 631	Volodarsk (Володарск) town*; Frolishchi (Фролищи); Ilyinogorsk (Ильиногорск); Reshetikha (Решетиха); Smolino (Смолино); Tsentralny (Центральный); Yuganets (Юганец)	4
Diveyevsky (Дивеевский)		district		22 232	22 632		6
Knyagininsky (Княгининский)		district		22 233	22 633	Knyaginino (Княгинино) town*	4
Koverninsky (Ковернинский)		district		22 234	22 634	Kovernino (Ковернино)	5
Krasnobakovsky (Краснобаковский)		district		22 235	22 635	Krasnye Baki (Красные Баки); Vetluzhsky (Ветлужский)	4
Krasnooktyabrsky (Краснооктябрьский)		district		22 236	22 636		12
Kstovsky (Кстовский)		district		22 237	22 637	Kstovo (Кстово) town*	13
Lukoyanovsky (Лукояновский)		district		22 239	22 639	Lukoyanov (Лукоянов) town*; Imeni Stepana Razina (Имени Степана Разина)	6
Lyskovsky (Лысковский)		district		22 240	22 640	Lyskovo (Лысково) town*	8
Pavlovsky (Павловский)		district		22 242	22 642	Gorbatov (Горбатов) tpwn*; Pavlovo (Павлово) town*; Vorsma (Ворсма) town*; Tumbotino (Тумботино)	6
Pilninsky (Пильнинский)		district		22 245	22 645	Pilna (Пильна)	11
Pochinkovsky (Починковский)		district		22 246	22 646		9
Sergachsky (Сергачский)		district		22 248	22 648	Sergach (Сергач) town*	10
Sechenovsky (Сеченовский)		district		22 249	22 649		7
Sosnovsky (Сосновский)		district		22 250	22 650	Sosnovskoye (Сосновское)	8
Spassky (Спасский)		district		22 251	22 651		7
Tonkinsky (Тонкинский)		district		22 252	22 652	Tonkino (Тонкино)	4
Tonshayevsky (Тоншаевский)		district		22 253	22 653	Pizhma (Пижма); Shaygino (Шайгино); Tonshayevo (Тоншаево)	6
Urensky (Уренский)		district		22 254	22 654	Uren (Урень) town*; Arya (Арья)	13
Sharangsky (Шарангский)		district		22 256	22 66	Sharanga (Шаранга)	9
Shatkovsky (Шатковский)		district		22 257	22 67	Lesogorsk (Лесогорск); Shatki (Шатки)	9
Sokolsky (Сокольский)		district	urban okrug	22 259	22 749	Sokolskoye (Сокольское)	3
