= Pervomaysky, Russia =

Pervomaysky (Russian: Первома́йский; masculine), Pervomayskaya (Первома́йская; feminine), or Pervomayskoye (Первома́йское; neuter) is the name of several inhabited localities in Russia. The names are the adjectives derived from "Пе́рвое Ма́я" (Pervoye Maya), Russian for May 1 (the International Workers' Day).

Urban localities

- Pervomaysky, Korkinsky District, Chelyabinsk Oblast, a work settlement in Korkinsky District of Chelyabinsk Oblast
- Pervomaysky (urban-type settlement), Kirov Oblast, a closed urban-type settlement in Kirov Oblast
- Pervomaysky, Gorodetsky District, Nizhny Novgorod Oblast, a work settlement in Gorodetsky District of Nizhny Novgorod Oblast
- Pervomaysky, Pervomaysky District, Tambov Oblast, a work settlement in Pervomaysky District of Tambov Oblast
- Pervomaysky, Tula Oblast, a work settlement in Shchyokinsky District of Tula Oblast
- Pervomaysky, Zabaykalsky Krai, an urban-type settlement in Shilkinsky District of Zabaykalsky Krai

Rural localities

- Pervomaysky, Giaginsky District, Republic of Adygea, a khutor in Giaginsky District of the Republic of Adygea
- Pervomaysky, Maykopsky District, Republic of Adygea, a settlement in Maykopsky District of the Republic of Adygea
- Pervomaysky, Agapovsky District, Chelyabinsk Oblast, a settlement in Agapovsky District of Chelyabinsk Oblast
- Pervomaysky, Ashinsky District, Chelyabinsk Oblast, a settlement in Ashinsky District of Chelyabinsk Oblast
- Pervomaysky, Nyazepetrovsky District, Chelyabinsk Oblast, a settlement in Nyazepetrovsky District of Chelyabinsk Oblast
- Pervomaysky (rural locality), Kirov Oblast, a settlement in Falyonsky District of Kirov Oblast
- Pervomaysky, Gaginsky District, Nizhny Novgorod Oblast, a settlement in Gaginsky District of Nizhny Novgorod Oblast
- Pervomaysky, Kulebaksky District, Nizhny Novgorod Oblast, a settlement in Kulebaksky District of Nizhny Novgorod Oblast
- Pervomaysky, Abdulinsky District, Orenburg Oblast, a settlement in Pervomaysky Selsoviet of Abdulinsky District
- Pervomaysky, Orenburgsky District, Orenburg Oblast, a settlement (formerly an urban-type settlemement) in Pervomaysky Settlement Council of Orenburgsky District (ru:Первомайский (Оренбургский район))
- Pervomaysky, Pervomaysky District, Orenburg Oblast, a settlement in Pervomaysky Selsoviet of Pervomaysky District
- Pervomaysky, Svetlinsky District, Orenburg Oblast, a settlement in Sputnikovsky Selsoviet of Svetlinsky District
- Pervomaysky, Bondarsky District, Tambov Oblast, a settlement in Bondarsky District of Tambov Oblast
- Pervomaysky, Inzhavinsky District, Tambov Oblast, a settlement in Inzhavinsky District of Tambov Oblast
- Pervomaysky, Nikiforovsky District, Tambov Oblast, a settlement in Nikiforovsky District of Tambov Oblast
- Pervomaysky, Bolshelomovissky Selsoviet, Pichayevsky District, Tambov Oblast, a settlement in Bolshelomovissky Selsoviet of Pichayevsky District of Tambov Oblast
- Pervomaysky, Lipovsky Selsoviet, Pichayevsky District, Tambov Oblast, a settlement in Lipovsky Selsoviet of Pichayevsky District of Tambov Oblast
- Pervomaysky, Rzhaksinsky District, Tambov Oblast, a settlement in Rzhaksinsky District of Tambov Oblast
- Pervomaysky, Tambovsky District, Tambov Oblast, a settlement in Tambovsky District of Tambov Oblast
- Pervomaysky, name of several other rural localities
- Pervomayskaya, Kirov Oblast, a village in Svechinsky District of Kirov Oblast
- Pervomayskaya, Kurgan Oblast, a village in Petukhovsky District of Kurgan Oblast
- Pervomayskaya, name of several other rural localities
- Pervomayskoye, Amur Oblast, a selo in Tyndinsky District of Amur Oblast
- Pervomayskoye, Leningrad Oblast, a logging depot settlement in Vyborgsky District of Leningrad Oblast
- Pervomayskoye, Orenburg Oblast, a selo in Pervomaysky Selsoviet of Sol-Iletsky District
- Pervomayskoye, Tomsk Oblast, a selo in Pervomaysky District of Tomsk Oblast
- Pervomayskoye, name of several other rural localities

Historical names

- Pervomaysky, name of the town of Novodvinsk before 1977

Historical localities

- Pervomaysky, a former urban-type settlement in Kirov Oblast; since 2005—a part of the town of Slobodskoy
- Pervomaysky, a former urban-type settlement in Moscow Oblast; since 2003—a part of the city of Korolyov
