= Balakhna (inhabited locality) =

Balakhna (Russian: Балахна) is the name of several inhabited localities in Russia.

Urban localities

- Balakhna, a town in Balakhninsky District of Nizhny Novgorod Oblast; administratively incorporated as a town of district significance

Rural localities

- Balakhna, Ivanovo Oblast, a village in Furmanovsky District of Ivanovo Oblast
- Balakhna, Lipetsk Oblast, a selo in Ksizovsky Selsoviet of Zadonsky District of Lipetsk Oblast
- Balakhna, Perevozsky District, Nizhny Novgorod Oblast, a village in Ichalkovsky Selsoviet of Perevozsky District of Nizhny Novgorod Oblast
- Balakhna, Tula Oblast, a village in Shakhtersky Rural Okrug of Bogoroditsky District of Tula Oblast
