= Vilya =

Vilya may refer to:

- Vilya (urban-type settlement), an urban-type settlement in Nizhny Novgorod Oblast, Russia
- Vilya, one of the Three Rings from J. R. R. Tolkien's Middle-earth legendarium
- Vilya, a diminutive of the Russian male first name Avel
