= List of populated places in Ardatov District, Nizhny Novgorod Oblast =

The Ardatov District (Russian: Ардатовский район) was founded on June 10, 1929, from the abolished Ardatov and Diveyevso volosts of Arzamas Uyezd. From July 1929 to September 1930, it was part of the Murom Okrug, after the liquidation of which it was directly included in the Nizhny Novgorod Oblast. Subsequently, its boundaries were repeatedly changed both in the direction of enlargement (in 1932, 1935, 1957, 1963, and 1965) and reduction (in 1929, 1933, 1940, 1944, 1958, 1965). From January 1954 to April 1957, the district was part of Arzamas Oblast. On October 24, 2005, as part of local self-government reform, the Ardatov Municipal District was created with its center in Ardatov, its boundaries defined to coincide with those of Ardatov District, and its municipal formations established. On May 4, 2022, the municipal formations were merged into the Ardatovsky Municipal Okrug, maintaining the existing boundaries.

Below is a list of all currently existing populated places (including those without permanent population), as well as those disestablished, as cited in reliable local history and reference sources:

== Existing populated places ==
Photo	Name	Status	Founded	Population	Situation	
	Alexandrovka (Russian: Александровка)	township	about 1850	6 (census, 2021)	List of populated places in Ardatov District, Nizhny Novgorod Oblast is located in Ardatovsky District	
	Ardatov (Russian: Ардатов)	town, district administrative center	1552 (according to local historians); 1578 (first citation)	3,225 (census)	List of populated places in Ardatov District, Nizhny Novgorod Oblast is located in Ardatovsky District	
	Atemasovo (Russian: Атемасово)	township	1611 (first citation)	267 (census, 2021)	List of populated places in Ardatov District, Nizhny Novgorod Oblast is located in Ardatovsky District	
	Avtodeyevo (Russian: Автодеево)	township	1616 (first citation)	98 (census, 2021)	List of populated places in Ardatov District, Nizhny Novgorod Oblast is located in Ardatovsky District	
	Belyayevo (Russian: Беляево)	village	1601 (first citation)	137 (census, 2021)	List of populated places in Ardatov District, Nizhny Novgorod Oblast is located in Ardatovsky District	
	Beryozovka (Russian: Берёзовка)	township	1677 (first citation)	17 (census, 2021)	List of populated places in Ardatov District, Nizhny Novgorod Oblast is located in Ardatovsky District	
	Chetvertovo (Russian: Четвертово)	village	early 17th century	10 (census, 2021)	List of populated places in Ardatov District, Nizhny Novgorod Oblast is located in Ardatovsky District	
	Chuvarleyka (Russian: Чуварлейка)	township	before 1640	17 (census, 2021)	List of populated places in Ardatov District, Nizhny Novgorod Oblast is located in Ardatovsky District	
	Chuvarley-Maydan (Russian: Чуварлей-Майдан)	township	about 1655	168 (census, 2021)	List of populated places in Ardatov District, Nizhny Novgorod Oblast is located in Ardatovsky District	
	Dokukino (Russian: Докукино)	village	1586 (first citation)	162 (census, 2021)	List of populated places in Ardatov District, Nizhny Novgorod Oblast is located in Ardatovsky District	
	Dubovka (Russian: Дубовка)	township	1721 (first citation)	40 (census, 2021)	List of populated places in Ardatov District, Nizhny Novgorod Oblast is located in Ardatovsky District	
	Gari (Russian: Гари)	township	1606	32 (census, 2021)	List of populated places in Ardatov District, Nizhny Novgorod Oblast is located in Ardatovsky District	
	Golyatkino (Russian: Голяткино)	village	10—11th centuries (as a pagan settlement); 1628 (as a Russian village, first citation)	278 (census, 2021)	List of populated places in Ardatov District, Nizhny Novgorod Oblast is located in Ardatovsky District	
	Ideal (Russian: Идеал)	rural settlement	early 20th century (as Pankov hamlet)	181 (census, 2021)	List of populated places in Ardatov District, Nizhny Novgorod Oblast is located in Ardatovsky District	
	Izmaylovka (Russian: Измайловка)	township	early 18th century	41 (census, 2021)	List of populated places in Ardatov District, Nizhny Novgorod Oblast is located in Ardatovsky District	}
	Kanerga (Russian: Канерга)	township	17th century	159 (census, 2021)	List of populated places in Ardatov District, Nizhny Novgorod Oblast is located in Ardatovsky District	
	Karkaley (Russian: Каркалей)	village	1786	99 (census, 2021)	List of populated places in Ardatov District, Nizhny Novgorod Oblast is located in Ardatovsky District	
	Karmaleyka (Russian: Кармалейка)	township	mid 17th century	33 (census, 2021)	List of populated places in Ardatov District, Nizhny Novgorod Oblast is located in Ardatovsky District	
	Kavley (Russian: Кавлей)	village	1628 (first citation)	6 (census, 2021)	List of populated places in Ardatov District, Nizhny Novgorod Oblast is located in Ardatovsky District	
	Khokhlovo (Russian: Хохлово)	township	1613 (first citation)	1 (census, 2021)	List of populated places in Ardatov District, Nizhny Novgorod Oblast is located in Ardatovsky District	
	Khripunovo (Russian: Хрипуново)	township	1610 (first citation)	425 (census, 2021)	List of populated places in Ardatov District, Nizhny Novgorod Oblast is located in Ardatovsky District	
	Kologreyevo (Russian: Кологреево)	township	1606 (first citation)	60 (census, 2021)	List of populated places in Ardatov District, Nizhny Novgorod Oblast is located in Ardatovsky District	
	Kotovka (Russian: Котовка)	township	between 1647 and 1676	383 (census, 2021)	List of populated places in Ardatov District, Nizhny Novgorod Oblast is located in Ardatovsky District	
	Krasnaya Rechka (Russian: Красная Речка)	rural settlement	late 19th century	3 (census, 2021)	List of populated places in Ardatov District, Nizhny Novgorod Oblast is located in Ardatovsky District	
	Kruglovo (Russian: Круглово)	township	1651 (first citation)	322 (census, 2021)	List of populated places in Ardatov District, Nizhny Novgorod Oblast is located in Ardatovsky District	
	Kudley (Russian: Кудлей)	township	between 1628 and 1641	16 (census, 2021)	List of populated places in Ardatov District, Nizhny Novgorod Oblast is located in Ardatovsky District	
	Kuzgorod (Russian: Кузгородь)	village	1618 (first citation)	46 (census, 2021)	List of populated places in Ardatov District, Nizhny Novgorod Oblast is located in Ardatovsky District	
	Kuzhendeyevo (Russian: Кужендеево)	township	1564 (first citation)	560 (census, 2021)	List of populated places in Ardatov District, Nizhny Novgorod Oblast is located in Ardatovsky District	
	Kuzyatovo (Russian: Кузятово)	township	before 1629	231 (census, 2021)	List of populated places in Ardatov District, Nizhny Novgorod Oblast is located in Ardatovsky District	
	Lemet (Russian: Леметь)	township	1584 (first citation)	159 (census, 2021)	List of populated places in Ardatov District, Nizhny Novgorod Oblast is located in Ardatovsky District	
	Levashovo (Russian: Левашово)	township	1613 (first citation)	6 (census, 2021)	List of populated places in Ardatov District, Nizhny Novgorod Oblast is located in Ardatovsky District	
	Lichadeyevo (Russian: Личадеево)	township	1628 (first citation)	471 (census, 2021)	List of populated places in Ardatov District, Nizhny Novgorod Oblast is located in Ardatovsky District	
	Lipeley (Russian: Липелей)	village	1627 (first citation under the name of Novo-Lipeley)	108 (census, 2021)	List of populated places in Ardatov District, Nizhny Novgorod Oblast is located in Ardatovsky District	
	Lipovka (Russian: Липовка)	township	about 1685	239 (census, 2021)	List of populated places in Ardatov District, Nizhny Novgorod Oblast is located in Ardatovsky District	
	Malinovka (Russian: Малиновка)	village	1579 (first citation)	0 (census, 2021)	List of populated places in Ardatov District, Nizhny Novgorod Oblast is located in Ardatovsky District	
	Malye Pany (Russian: Малые Паны)	village	19th century	0 (census, 2021)	List of populated places in Ardatov District, Nizhny Novgorod Oblast is located in Ardatovsky District	
	Mechasovo (Russian: Мечасово)	township	1593 (first citation)	14 (census, 2021)	List of populated places in Ardatov District, Nizhny Novgorod Oblast is located in Ardatovsky District	
	Mikheyevka (Russian: Михеевка)	township	early 18th century	295 (census, 2021)	List of populated places in Ardatov District, Nizhny Novgorod Oblast is located in Ardatovsky District	
	Miyakushi (Russian: Миякуши)	village	before 1628	5 (census, 2021)	List of populated places in Ardatov District, Nizhny Novgorod Oblast is located in Ardatovsky District	
	Mostovka (Russian: Мостовка)	village	early 18th century	0 (census, 2021)	List of populated places in Ardatov District, Nizhny Novgorod Oblast is located in Ardatovsky District	
	Mukhtolovo (Russian: Мухтолово)	town	1702	4,248 (population est, 2025)	List of populated places in Ardatov District, Nizhny Novgorod Oblast is located in Ardatovsky District	
	Myza (Russian: Мыза)	rural settlement	17th century	10 (census, 2021)	List of populated places in Ardatov District, Nizhny Novgorod Oblast is located in Ardatovsky District	
	Nadyozhino (Russian: Надёжино)	township	13th century (as a Volga Bulgarian settlement); 1611 (under the name of Savino or Savinovo, first citation); approx. since 1700 present-day name	249 (census, 2021)	List of populated places in Ardatov District, Nizhny Novgorod Oblast is located in Ardatovsky District	
	Novaya Lazarevka (Russian: Новая Лазаревка)	village	18th century	52 (census, 2021)	List of populated places in Ardatov District, Nizhny Novgorod Oblast is located in Ardatovsky District	
	Novoley (Russian: Новолей)	village	18th century	14 (census, 2021)	List of populated places in Ardatov District, Nizhny Novgorod Oblast is located in Ardatovsky District	
	Nucha (Russian: Нуча)	township	1593 (first citation)	8 (census, 2021)	List of populated places in Ardatov District, Nizhny Novgorod Oblast is located in Ardatovsky District	
	Nucharovo (Russian: Нучарово)	township	1585 (first citation)	1 (census, 2021)	List of populated places in Ardatov District, Nizhny Novgorod Oblast is located in Ardatovsky District	
	Obkhod (Russian: Обход)	village	1721 (first citation)	24 (census, 2021)	List of populated places in Ardatov District, Nizhny Novgorod Oblast is located in Ardatovsky District	
	Pashutino (Russian: Пашутино)	township	mid 18th century	84 (census, 2021)	List of populated places in Ardatov District, Nizhny Novgorod Oblast is located in Ardatovsky District	
	Pervinka (Russian: Первинка)	rural settlement	before 1929	15 (census, 2021)	List of populated places in Ardatov District, Nizhny Novgorod Oblast is located in Ardatovsky District	
	Pisarevo (Russian: Писарево)	township	1570s	42 (census, 2021)	List of populated places in Ardatov District, Nizhny Novgorod Oblast is located in Ardatovsky District	
	Polyana (Russian: Поляна)	township	1578 (first citation)	309 (census, 2021)	List of populated places in Ardatov District, Nizhny Novgorod Oblast is located in Ardatovsky District	
	Pomelikha (Russian: Помелиха)	village	1780 (first citation)	0 (census, 2021)	List of populated places in Ardatov District, Nizhny Novgorod Oblast is located in Ardatovsky District	
	Razmazley (Russian: Размазлей)	township	early 18th century	423 (census, 2021)	List of populated places in Ardatov District, Nizhny Novgorod Oblast is located in Ardatovsky District	
	Rizadeyevo (Russian: Ризадеево)	township	1593 (first citation under the name of Seryakusha on Nucha Hills)	56 (census, 2021)	List of populated places in Ardatov District, Nizhny Novgorod Oblast is located in Ardatovsky District	
	Sakony (Russian: Саконы)	township	9th century (as a Volga Bulgarian settlement; 1552 (as a Russian township)	1,083 (census, 2021)	List of populated places in Ardatov District, Nizhny Novgorod Oblast is located in Ardatovsky District	
	Sakony (Russian: Саконы)	rural settlement	1928	50 (census, 2021)	List of populated places in Ardatov District, Nizhny Novgorod Oblast is located in Ardatovsky District	
	Schotochnoye (Russian: Щёточное)	village	mid 18th century	68 (census, 2021)	List of populated places in Ardatov District, Nizhny Novgorod Oblast is located in Ardatovsky District	
	Shpaga (Russian: Шпага)	village	mid 17th century	41 (census, 2021)	List of populated places in Ardatov District, Nizhny Novgorod Oblast is located in Ardatovsky District	
	Siyazma (Russian: Сиязьма)	township	late 17th century	6 (census, 2021)	List of populated places in Ardatov District, Nizhny Novgorod Oblast is located in Ardatovsky District	
	Sosnovka (Russian: Сосновка)	township	1719 (first citation)	1 (census, 2021)	List of populated places in Ardatov District, Nizhny Novgorod Oblast is located in Ardatovsky District	
	Sosnovka (Russian: Сосновка)	township	1719 (first citation)	15 (census, 2021)	List of populated places in Ardatov District, Nizhny Novgorod Oblast is located in Ardatovsky District	
	Styoksovo (Russian: Стёксово)	township	2nd century (as a Mordvinian settlement); 1612 (as a Russian township, first citation)	571 (census, 2021)	List of populated places in Ardatov District, Nizhny Novgorod Oblast is located in Ardatovsky District	
	Turkushi (Russian: Туркуши)	township	1646 (first citation)	524 (census, 2021)	List of populated places in Ardatov District, Nizhny Novgorod Oblast is located in Ardatovsky District	
	Turtapki (Russian: Туртапки)	village	mid 17th century	92 (census, 2021)	List of populated places in Ardatov District, Nizhny Novgorod Oblast is located in Ardatovsky District	
	Urvan (Russian: Урвань)	village	1719 (first citation)	13 (census, 2021)	List of populated places in Ardatov District, Nizhny Novgorod Oblast is located in Ardatovsky District	
	Uzhovka (Russian: Ужовка)	village	mid 17th century	3 (census, 2021)	List of populated places in Ardatov District, Nizhny Novgorod Oblast is located in Ardatovsky District	
	Venets (Russian: Венец)	rural settlement	1911 (as passing loop Manasikha)	86 (census, 2021)	List of populated places in Ardatov District, Nizhny Novgorod Oblast is located in Ardatovsky District	
	Vinogradovka (Russian: Виноградовка)	rural settlement	1925	2 (census, 2021)	List of populated places in Ardatov District, Nizhny Novgorod Oblast is located in Ardatovsky District	
	Vishnyovaya (Russian: Вишнёвая)	village	mid 18th century (as Teryayevka); 1920s (united with the village of Klopovka into Ter-Klopovka); 1965 (present-day name)	35 (census, 2021)	List of populated places in Ardatov District, Nizhny Novgorod Oblast is located in Ardatovsky District	
	Vypolzovo (Russian: Выползово)	township	1646 (first citation)	21 (census, 2021)	List of populated places in Ardatov District, Nizhny Novgorod Oblast is located in Ardatovsky District	
	Vysokovo (Russian: Высоково)	village	1646 (first citation)	131 (census, 2021)	List of populated places in Ardatov District, Nizhny Novgorod Oblast is located in Ardatovsky District	
	Yusupovo (Russian: Юсупово)	township	about 1715	2 (census, 2021)	List of populated places in Ardatov District, Nizhny Novgorod Oblast is located in Ardatovsky District	
	Zarechnoye (Russian: Заречное)	township	1960 (as a result of unification of the townships Bolshiye Seryakushi and Malye Seryakushi)	23 (census, 2021)	List of populated places in Ardatov District, Nizhny Novgorod Oblast is located in Ardatovsky District	
	Zhureleyka (Russian: Журелейка)	township	17th — early 18th century	256 (census, 2021)	List of populated places in Ardatov District, Nizhny Novgorod Oblast is located in Ardatovsky District	

== Disestablished populated places ==
Photo	Name	Status	Founded	Disestablished	Situation
	Beloramenka (Russian: Белораменка)	rural settlement	1921	2008	List of populated places in Ardatov District, Nizhny Novgorod Oblast is located in Ardatovsky District
	Blyudo (Russian: Блюдо)	rural settlement	early 20th century	2008	List of populated places in Ardatov District, Nizhny Novgorod Oblast is located in Ardatovsky District
	Bolshiye Seryakushi (Russian: Большие Серякуши)	township	1613 (first citation)	1960 (united with township Malye Seryakushi into township Zarechnoye)	List of populated places in Ardatov District, Nizhny Novgorod Oblast is located in Ardatovsky District
	Bykovka (Russian: Быковка)	village	before 1767	1965 (annexed to township Lipovka)	List of populated places in Ardatov District, Nizhny Novgorod Oblast is located in Ardatovsky District
	Bykovka (Russian: Быковка)	rural settlement	no data	1977	List of populated places in Ardatov District, Nizhny Novgorod Oblast is located in Ardatovsky District
	Dubrava (Russian: Дубрава)	rural settlement	19th century	between 1980 and 2000	List of populated places in Ardatov District, Nizhny Novgorod Oblast is located in Ardatovsky District
	Gremilovka (Russian: Гремиловка)	rural settlement	early 20th century	between 1980 and 2000	List of populated places in Ardatov District, Nizhny Novgorod Oblast is located in Ardatovsky District
	Guskoy (Russian: Гуськой)	rural settlement	before 1925 (under the name of Semaikha)	between 1980 and 2000	List of populated places in Ardatov District, Nizhny Novgorod Oblast is located in Ardatovsky District
	Kalenikha (Russian: Калениха)	rural settlement	before 1934	1969	no data
	Kirgino (Russian: Киргино)	village	1628 (first citation)	before 1681	no data
	Klopovka (Russian: Клоповка)	селение	mid 18th century (first citation)	1920s (in the 1920s it was united with the village of Teryayevo (or Teryayevka) into Ter-Klopovka; since 1965 Vishnyovaya	List of populated places in Ardatov District, Nizhny Novgorod Oblast is located in Ardatovsky District
	Koltomenye (Russian: Колтоменье)	village	1785	1979	List of populated places in Ardatov District, Nizhny Novgorod Oblast is located in Ardatovsky District
	Korobino (Russian: Коробино)	village	1616 (first citation)	1977	List of populated places in Ardatov District, Nizhny Novgorod Oblast is located in Ardatovsky District
	Kryuchkovo (Russian: Крючково)	rural settlement	about 1910	between 1978 and 2000	List of populated places in Ardatov District, Nizhny Novgorod Oblast is located in Ardatovsky District
	Leninsky (Russian: Ленинский)	rural settlement	no data	between 1978 and 2000	List of populated places in Ardatov District, Nizhny Novgorod Oblast is located in Ardatovsky District
	Malye Seryakushi (Russian: Малые Серякуши)	township	1751 (first citation)	1960 (united with township Bolshiye Seryakushi into township Zarechnoye)	List of populated places in Ardatov District, Nizhny Novgorod Oblast is located in Ardatovsky District
	Mary (Russian: Мары)	rural settlement	early 20th century	1965	List of populated places in Ardatov District, Nizhny Novgorod Oblast is located in Ardatovsky District
	Mikhaylovka (Russian: Михайловка)	village	early 20th century	1965	List of populated places in Ardatov District, Nizhny Novgorod Oblast is located in Ardatovsky District
	Mikheyevka (Russian: Михеевка)	rural settlement	early 18th century (sometimes called Nazyrinka)	1977	no data
	Molyaksa (Russian: Молякса)	township	1552	1965	List of populated places in Ardatov District, Nizhny Novgorod Oblast is located in Ardatovsky District
	Moshkoley (Russian: Мошколей)	village	1721 (first citation)	before 1945 (annexed to Totorshevo)	List of populated places in Ardatov District, Nizhny Novgorod Oblast is located in Ardatovsky District
	Osinovka (Russian: Осиновка)	village	no data	1977	List of populated places in Ardatov District, Nizhny Novgorod Oblast is located in Ardatovsky District
	Petryayevo] (Russian: Петряево)	village	after 1925	between 1980 and 2000	List of populated places in Ardatov District, Nizhny Novgorod Oblast is located in Ardatovsky District
	Schipovka (Russian: Щиповка)	village	no data	1979	List of populated places in Ardatov District, Nizhny Novgorod Oblast is located in Ardatovsky District
	Sotsgorodok (Russian: Соцгородок)	rural settlement	no data	between 1980 and 2000	List of populated places in Ardatov District, Nizhny Novgorod Oblast is located in Ardatovsky District
	Totorshevo (Russian: Тоторшево)	village	about 10th century (as a Cuman settlement); 1578 (as a Mordovian village)	1962 (annexed to Ardatov)	List of populated places in Ardatov District, Nizhny Novgorod Oblast is located in Ardatovsky District
	Vileyka (Russian: Вилейка)	village	1784 (first citation)	1979	List of populated places in Ardatov District, Nizhny Novgorod Oblast is located in Ardatovsky District
	Voshley (Russian: Вошлей)	rural settlement	no data	1979	List of populated places in Ardatov District, Nizhny Novgorod Oblast is located in Ardatovsky District
	Yuzhilino (Russian: Южилино)	rural settlement	no data	between 1980 and 2000	List of populated places in Ardatov District, Nizhny Novgorod Oblast is located in Ardatovsky District
	Zobovo (Russian: Зобово)	rural settlement	mid 19th century	2008	List of populated places in Ardatov District, Nizhny Novgorod Oblast is located in Ardatovsky District

== Works cited ==
- Базаев, Александр (2004). Исторические сведения о селениях Ардатовского района (in Russian). Арзамас: АГПИ. ISBN 5-86517-194-1.
- Базаев, Александр (2014). История Ардатова в событиях и лицах (in Russian). Арзамас: Арзамасская типография. ISBN 978-5-9927-0097-8.
- Бугров, Юрий (2002). Мухтолово: от А до Я (in Russian). Курск: ЮМЭКС. ISBN 5-89365-029-8.
- Гладкова, Л. В.; Седов, Ал. В., eds. (2000). Ардатовский край. Прошлое и настоящее (in Russian). Нижний Новгород: Нижполиграф. ISBN 5-93413-004-8.
- Куприянова, Н. И., ed. (1984). Административно-территориальное деление и органы власти Нижегородского края — Горьковской области (1929—1979) (in Russian). Горький: Волго-Вятское книжное издательство.
