= Istomino Airfield =

Istomino (Pravdinsk)
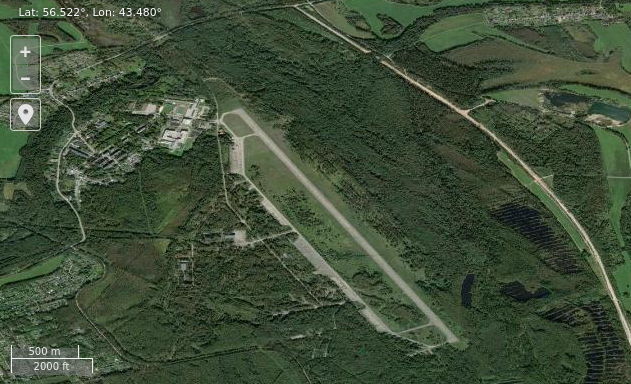
- Satellite imagery of Istomino airfield
- IATA: none; ICAO: none

Summary
- Airport type: Private
- Location: Balakhna
- Elevation AMSL: 253 ft / 77 m
- Coordinates: 56°31′18″N 43°28′48″E

Map
- Location in Nizhny Novgorod Oblast Istomino (Pravdinsk) (Russia)

Runways
| Direction | Length | | Surface |
| Direction | ft | m | Surface |
|---|---|---|---|
| 14/32 | 8,202 | 2,500 | Asphalt |

Istomino Airfield is a private general aviation airfield located 5 km northwest of Balakhna and 38 km northwest of Nizhny Novgorod, Nizhny Novgorod Oblast, Russia.

The airfield is formerly Pravdinsk, a military airbase of the Soviet/Russian Air Defence Forces and was named after the nearby town of Pravdinsk. It was a small air base with a few taxiways and tarmac. Units that were stationed at Pravdinsk include 786th Fighter Aviation Regiment (786 IAP), 16th Air Defence Corps, Moscow Air Defence District, which had 5 Mikoyan-Gurevich MiG-25 (ASCC: Foxbat) aircraft in the 1970s and upgraded to 31 Mikoyan MiG-31 (ASCC: Foxhound) aircraft in the 1980s.

In 2004, after five year of disuse, Pravdinsk Airfield (now more often referred to as Istomino Airfield (Аэродром Истомино), after the nearby village) saw an aircraft again. Now the airfield is used by Nizhny Novgorod parachute sports enthusiasts, who praise it as an excellent drop zone.

== See also ==
- List of military airbases in Russia
