= Kulebaki Metallurgical Production Association =

Coordinates: 55.421°N 42.534°E

Kulebaki Metallurgical Production Association (Russian: Кулебакский металлургический завод) is a company based in Kulebaki, Russia and established in 1866.

The Kulebaki Metallurgical Plant was one of a group of metallurgical enterprises subordinate to the now-defunct Soviet Ministry of Aviation Industry which manufactured semi-finished products from steel, aluminum, magnesium, titanium, nickel, and super alloys for use in aerospace systems. It is now offering semi-finished metallurgical products for the civil market. In 2005 the company was united with the Kulebak Ring Rolling Plant under the new Ruspolymet brand.

== Narrow-Gauge Railway ==
The narrow-gauge railway of the Kulebaki Metallurgical Plant was one of the oldest in Russia until 2018.

By the early 1970s, the narrow-gauge railway lines outside the city of Kulebaki had been dismantled. Peat extraction in the vicinity of Kulebaki had ceased, timber was now transported by road, and a broad-gauge line was laid from Mukhtolovo Station to transport dolomite from Gremyachevo as a replacement for the narrow-gauge railway. Since the 1970s and up to the present day, the narrow-gauge railway has only served technological intra-plant transportation needs of the Kulebaki Metallurgical Plant.
