= Smolin =

Smolin (masculine) or Smolina (feminine) is a last name shared by the following people:

- Anna Smolina (b. 1994), Russian tennis player
- Barry Smolin (b. 1961), American radio host, composer, and writer
- David M. Smolin, American law professor
- Innokenty Smolin (1884–1973), Russian general
- Ivan Smolin (1895–1937), commander of the Soviet 21st Rifle Division
- John A. Smolin (b. 1967), American physicist
- Lee Smolin (b. 1955), American theoretical physicist
- Mikhail Smolin (1971–2025), Russian historian
- Svetlana Smolina, Russian pianist
- Yefim Smolin, Russian glass-maker

== See also ==
- Smolin Gallery, defunct avant-garde art venue in New York City, United States
- Smolino (disambiguation)
