= Shchyolkovo (inhabited locality) =

Shchyolkovo or Shchelkovo (Russian: Щёлково) is the name of several inhabited localities in Russia.

Urban localities

- Shchyolkovo, a city in Shchyolkovsky District of Moscow Oblast

Rural localities

- Shchelkovo, Nizhny Novgorod Oblast, a village under the administrative jurisdiction of the work settlement of Tumbotino in Pavlovsky District of Nizhny Novgorod Oblast
- Shchelkovo, Kalyazinsky District, Tver Oblast, a village in Kalyazinsky District, Tver Oblast
- Shchelkovo, Kashinsky District, Tver Oblast, a village in Kashinsky District, Tver Oblast
- Shchelkovo, Kimrsky District, Tver Oblast, a village in Kimrsky District, Tver Oblast
- Shchelkovo, Konakovsky District, Tver Oblast, a village in Konakovsky District, Tver Oblast
- Shchelkovo, Rzhevsky District, Tver Oblast, a village in Rzhevsky District, Tver Oblast
- Shchelkovo, Ferapontovsky Selsoviet, Kirillovsky District, Vologda Oblast, a village in Ferapontovsky Selsoviet of Kirillovsky District of Vologda Oblast
- Shchelkovo, Goritsky Selsoviet, Kirillovsky District, Vologda Oblast, a village in Goritsky Selsoviet of Kirillovsky District of Vologda Oblast
- Shchelkovo, Mezhdurechensky District, Vologda Oblast, a village in Staroselsky Selsoviet of Mezhdurechensky District of Vologda Oblast
- Shchelkovo, Yaroslavl Oblast, a village in Osetsky Rural Okrug of Lyubimsky District of Yaroslavl Oblast
