= Kulebaksky District =

Kulebaksky District Кулебакский район (Russian)
- District
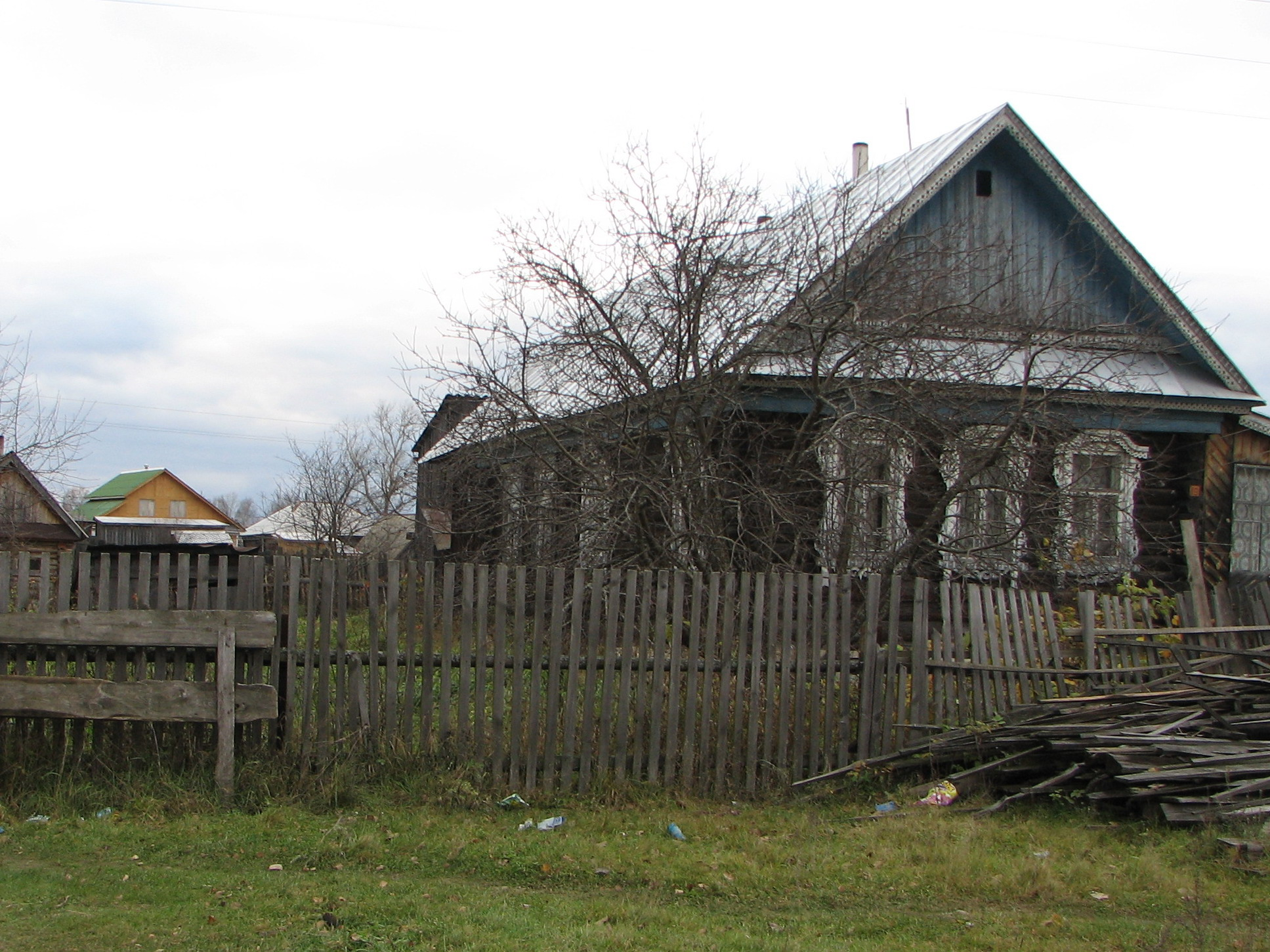
- The selo of Lomovka in Kulebaksky District

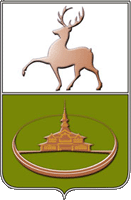
- Coat of arms
- Location of Kulebaksky District in Nizhny Novgorod Oblast
- Coordinates: 55°25′N 42°31′E
- Country: Russia
- Federal subject: Nizhny Novgorod Oblast
- Established: 1929
- Abolished: May 22, 2015
- Administrative center: Kulebaki

Area
  - Total: 938.9 km^{2} (362.5 sq mi)

Population (2010 Census)
  - Total: 52,377
  - Density: 55.79/km^{2} (144.5/sq mi)
  - Urban: 80.3%
  - Rural: 19.7%

Administrative structure
  - Administrative divisions: 1 Towns of district significance, 2 Work settlements, 4 Selsoviets
  - Inhabited localities: 1 cities/towns, 2 urban-type settlements, 24 rural localities

Municipal structure
  - Municipally incorporated as: Kulebaksky Municipal District
  - Municipal divisions: 3 urban settlements, 4 rural settlements
- Time zone: UTC+3 (MSK)
- OKTMO ID: 22727000

Population of Kulebaksky District
- 2010 Census: 52,377
- 2002 Census: 17,798
- 1989 Census: 16,285
- 1979 Census: 16,495

The Kulebaksky District (Russian: Кулеба́кский райо́н) was an administrative and municipal district (raion) in Nizhny Novgorod Oblast, Russia. It was located in the southwest of the oblast. The area of the district was 938.9 square kilometers (362.5 sq mi). Its administrative center was the town of Kulebaki. As of the 2010 Census, the total population of the district was 52,377, with the population of Kulebaki accounting for 68.3% of that number.

== History ==
The district was established in 1929. Per Law #65-Z of May 12, 2015, the district was transformed into a town of oblast significance of Kulebaki. In a similar manner, Law #60-Z of May 8, 2015 abolished Kulebaksky Municipal District and transformed it into Kulebaki Urban Okrug.

== Administrative and municipal divisions ==
As of May 2015, the district was administratively divided into one town of district significance (Kulebaki), two work settlements (Gremyachevo and Veletma), and four selsoviets (comprising twenty-four rural localities). Municipally, Kulebaksky Municipal District was divided into three urban settlements and four rural settlements.

== Notable residents ==
- Yelena Afanasyeva (born 1967 in Kulebaki), athlete
- Yakov Tryapitsyn (1897–1920), Soviet military and political figure
