= Kulebaki =

Town in Nizhny Novgorod Oblast, Russia

Kulebaki Кулебаки
- Town
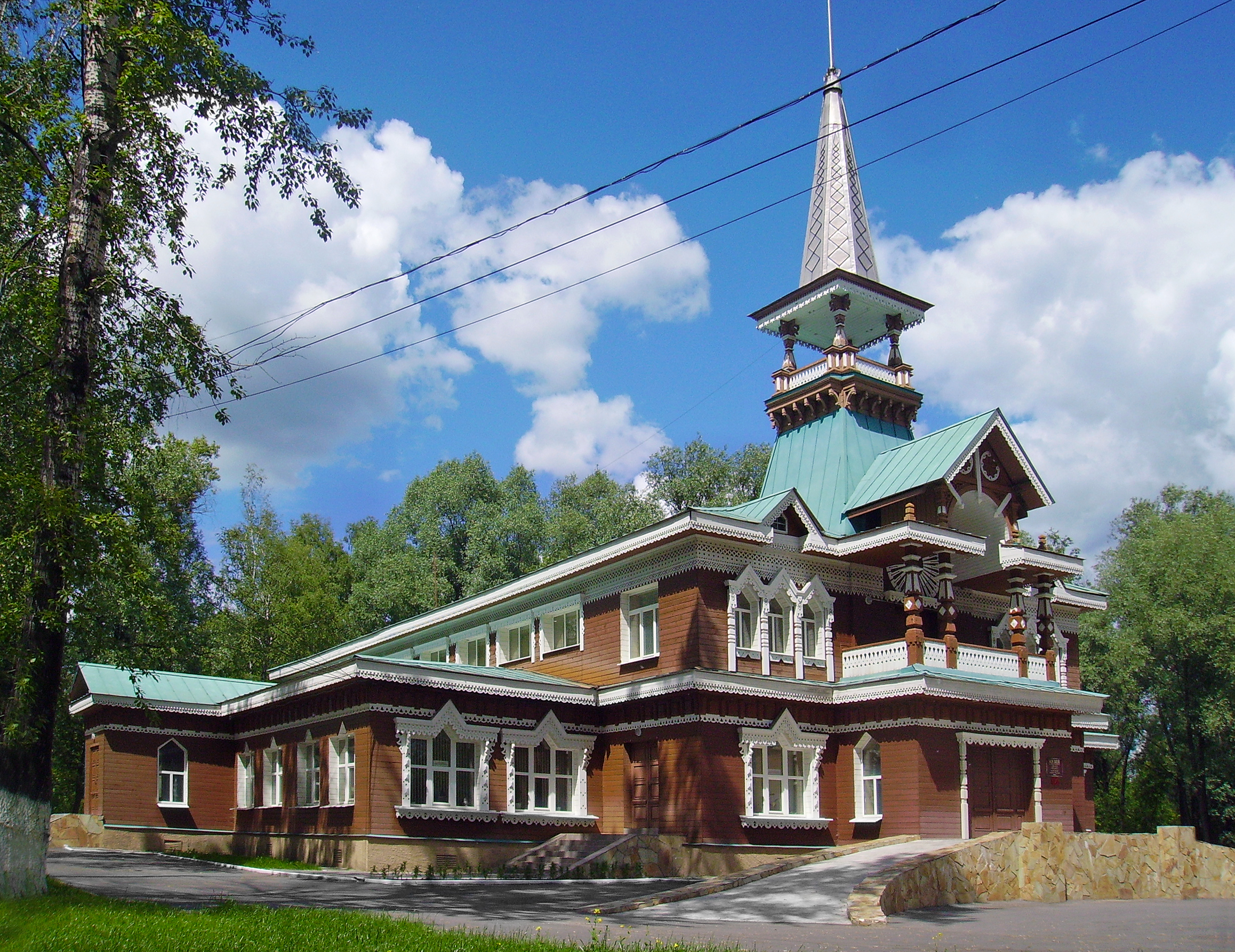
- People's House

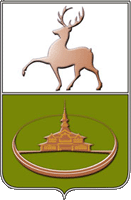
- Coat of arms
- Interactive map of Kulebaki
- Location of Kulebaki Kulebaki (Nizhny Novgorod Oblast)
- Coordinates: 55°25′N 42°32′E
- Country: Russia
- Federal subject: Nizhny Novgorod Oblast
- First mentioned: 1719
- Town status since: 1932
- Elevation: 105 m (344 ft)

Population (2010 Census)
  - Total: 35,759
  - Estimate (2021): 32,184 (−10%)

Administrative status
  - Subordinated to: town of oblast significance of Kulebaki
  - Capital of: town of oblast significance of Kulebaki

Municipal status
  - Urban okrug: Kulebaki Urban Okrug
  - Capital of: Kulebaki Urban Okrug
- Time zone: UTC+3 (MSK)
- Postal codes: 607010–607015, 607017, 607018, 607029
- OKTMO ID: 22727000001
- Website: kulebaki.nobl.ru

Kulebaki population
- 2010 Census: 35,759
- 2002 Census: 39,072
- 1989 Census: 45,727
- 1979 Census: 48,135

Kulebaki (Russian: Кулеба́ки) is a town in Nizhny Novgorod Oblast, Russia, located 188 kilometers (117 mi) southwest of Nizhny Novgorod, the administrative center of the oblast. As of the 2010 Census, its population was 35,759.

== History ==
The village of Kulebaki was first mentioned in 1719. Town status was granted to it in 1932.

== Administrative and municipal status ==
Within the framework of administrative divisions, it is, together with two work settlements (Gremyachevo and Veletma) and twenty-eight rural localities, incorporated as the town of oblast significance of Kulebaki—an administrative unit with the status equal to that of the districts. As a municipal division, the town of oblast significance of Kulebaki is incorporated as Kulebaki Urban Okrug.

Until May 2015, the town served as the administrative center of Kulebaksky District and, within the framework of administrative divisions, was incorporated within that district as a town of district significance. As a municipal division, it was incorporated as Kulebaki Urban Settlement within Kulebaksky Municipal District.

== Economy ==
The local metal-working plant, Ruspolymet, founded in 1866 and originally producing equipment for railway industry, is now producing components for aerospace industry as well.
