= Pravdinsk, Balakhna =

Pravdinsk Пра́вдинск
- Former urban-type settlement
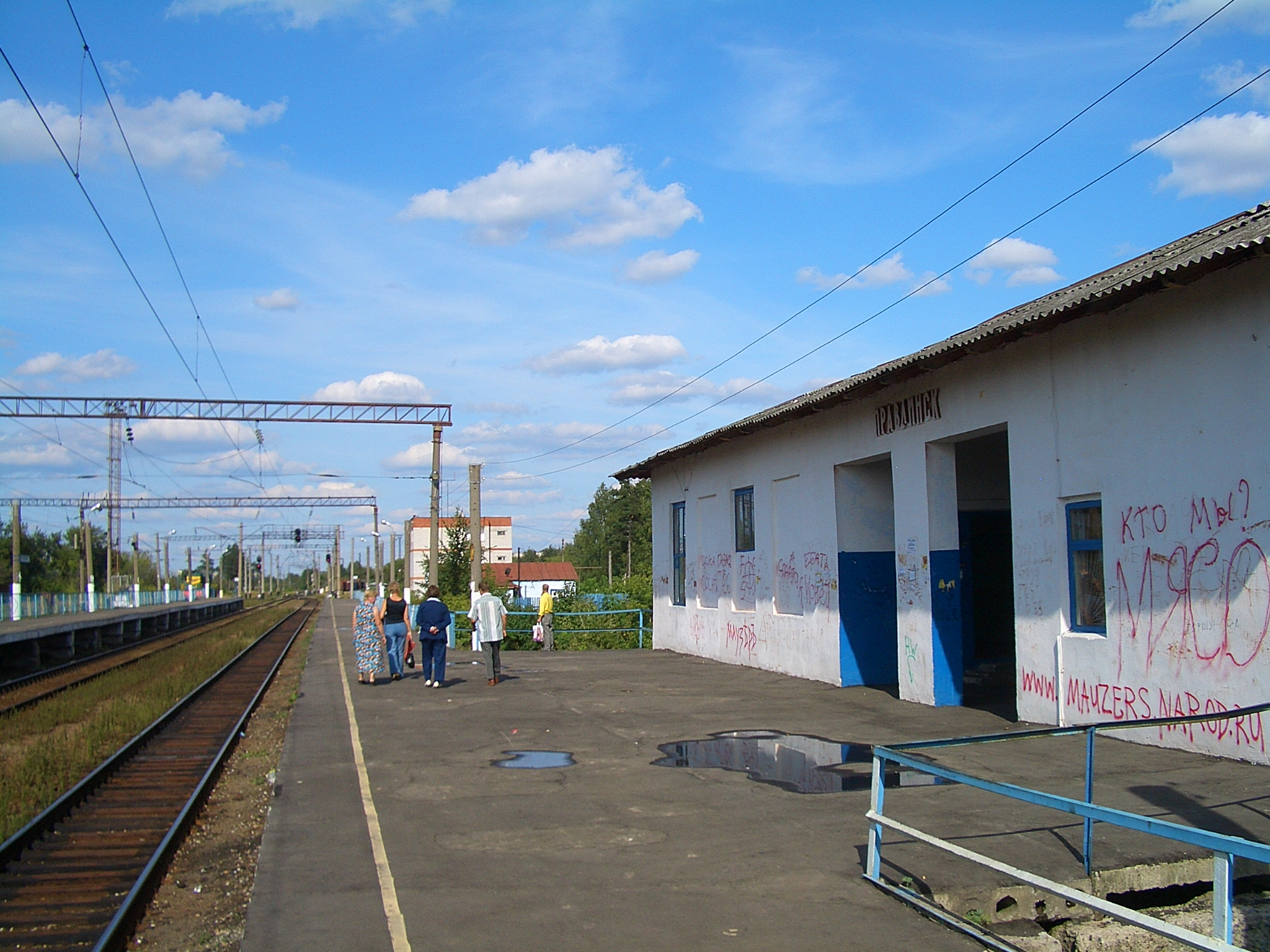
- Pravdinsk commuter train station
- Interactive map of Pravdinsk
- Location of Pravdinsk Pravdinsk (Nizhny Novgorod Oblast)
- Coordinates: 56°31′N 43°33′E
- Country: Russia
- Federal subject: Nizhny Novgorod Oblast
- Administrative district: Balakhninsky District
- Founded: 1932

Population
  - Estimate (1989): 32,395 )
- Postal codes: 606400, 606407, 606408

Pravdinsk (Russian: Пра́вдинск) was an urban locality (an urban-type settlement) in Balakhninsky District of Nizhny Novgorod Oblast, located a few kilometers northwest (upstream along the Volga) from the town of Balakhna. Pravdinsk was annexed by Balakhna in 1993, although the name continues in informal usage. Pravdinsk commuter train station (on the Zavolzhye-Nizhny Novgorod line) maintains its name as well.

The settlement was built along with a paper mill, "Pravdinsk Cellulose and Paper Combine" (Правдинский ЦБК), now known as OAO Volga, which still produces about one third of Russia's newsprint. The plant and the settlement were named after the Pravda newspaper, one of the main consumers of the newsprint produced by the mill.

The former Pravdinsk Air Base, now Istomino Airfield, is located within a few kilometers to the west of Pravdinsk, near the village of Istomino.
