= Sankhar, Vladimir Oblast =

Sankhar Санхар
- Settlement
- Location within Vladimir Oblast Location within Russia
- Coordinates: 56°24′N 42°23′E
- Country: Russia
- Region: Vladimir Oblast
- District: Vyaznikovsky District
- Time zone: UTC+3:00

Sankhar (Russian: Санхар) is a rural locality (a settlement) in Gorod Vyazniki, Vyaznikovsky District, Vladimir Oblast, Russia. The population was 49 as of 2010.

== Geography ==
Sankhar is located on the Sankhar Lake, 95 km northeast of Vyazniki (the district's administrative centre) by road. Frolishchi is the nearest rural locality.
