= Reshetikha =

Reshetikha Решетиха
- Urban-type settlement
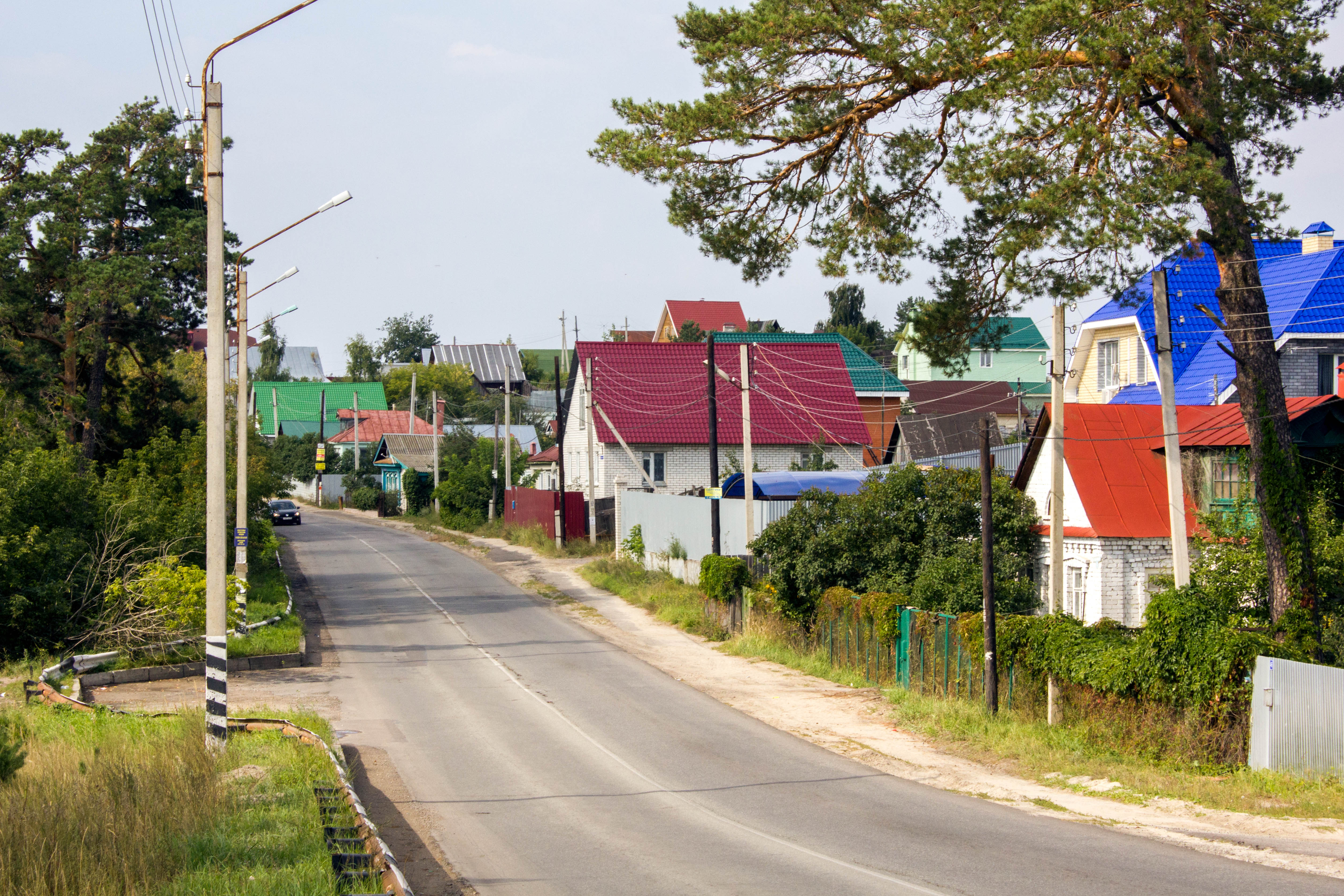
- Interactive map of Reshetikha
- Location of Reshetikha Reshetikha (Nizhny Novgorod Oblast)
- Coordinates: 56.2164°N 43.2968°E
- Country: Russia
- Federal subject: Nizhny Novgorod Oblast
- Administrative district: Volodarsky District
- Founded: 1810

Population (2010 Census)
  - Total: 6,775
  - Estimate (2025): 6,328 (−6.6%)
- Time zone: UTC+3 (MSK)
- Postal code: 606093
- OKTMO ID: 22631168051

Reshetikha (Russian: Решети́ха) is an urban locality (an urban-type settlement) in Volodarsky District of Nizhny Novgorod Oblast, Russia. Population: 6,775 (2010 census); 7,482 (2002 census); 8,165 (1989 Soviet census).
