= Smolino =

Smolino may refer to:

- Smolino, Poland, a village in Poland
- Smolino, Nizhny Novgorod Oblast, an urban-type settlement in Nizhny Novgorod Oblast, Russia
- Smolino, name of several rural localilites in Russia
