= Tsentralny, Volodarsky District, Nizhny Novgorod Oblast =

Tsentralny Центральный
- Urban-type settlement
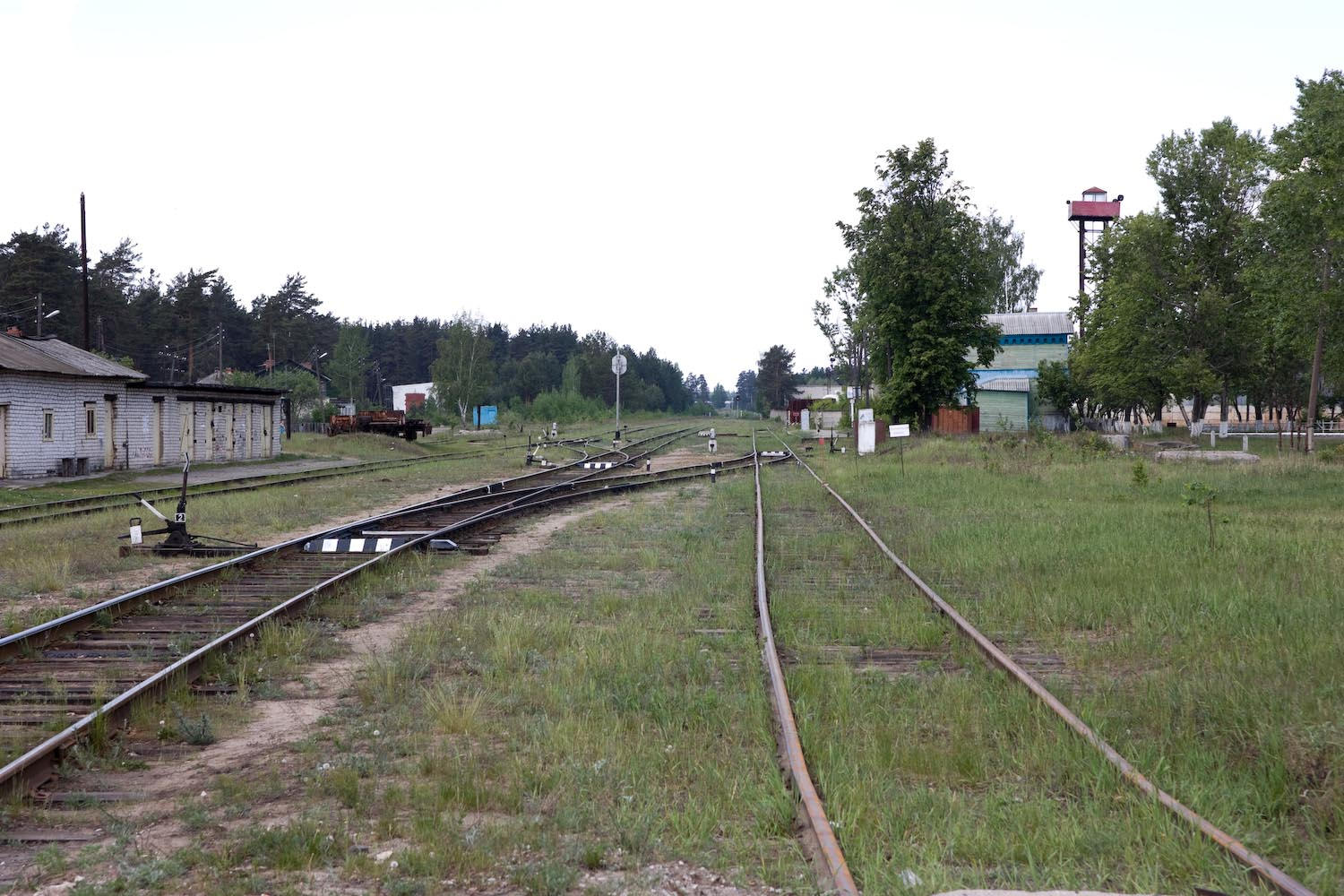
- Interactive map of Tsentralny
- Location of Tsentralny Tsentralny (Nizhny Novgorod Oblast)
- Coordinates: 56.2976°N 42.7928°E
- Country: Russia
- Federal subject: Nizhny Novgorod Oblast
- Administrative district: Volodarsky District
- Founded: 1958

Population (2010 Census)
  - Total: 2,957
  - Estimate (2021): 1,567 (−47%)
- Time zone: UTC+3 (MSK)
- Postal code: 606087
- OKTMO ID: 22631176051

Tsentralny (Russian: Центра́льный) is an urban locality (an urban-type settlement) in Volodarsky District of Nizhny Novgorod Oblast, Russia. Population: 2,957 (2010 census); 3,870 (2002 census); 2,428 (1989 Soviet census).
