= Gidrotorf =

Gidrotorf Гидроторф
- Urban-type settlement
- Interactive map of Gidrotorf
- Location of Gidrotorf Gidrotorf (Nizhny Novgorod Oblast)
- Coordinates: 56.4666°N 43.5331°E
- Country: Russia
- Federal subject: Nizhny Novgorod Oblast
- Administrative district: Balakhninsky District

Population (2010 Census)
  - Total: 7,557
  - Estimate (2021): 6,626 (−12.3%)
- Time zone: UTC+3 (MSK)
- Postal code: 606425
- OKTMO ID: 22605155051

Gidrotorf (Russian: Гидрото́рф) is an urban locality (an urban-type settlement) in Balakhninsky District of Nizhny Novgorod Oblast, Russia. Population: 7,557 (2010 census); 7,670 (2002 census); 7,622 (1989 Soviet census).
