= Maloye Kozino =

Maloye Kozino Малое Козино
- Urban-type settlement
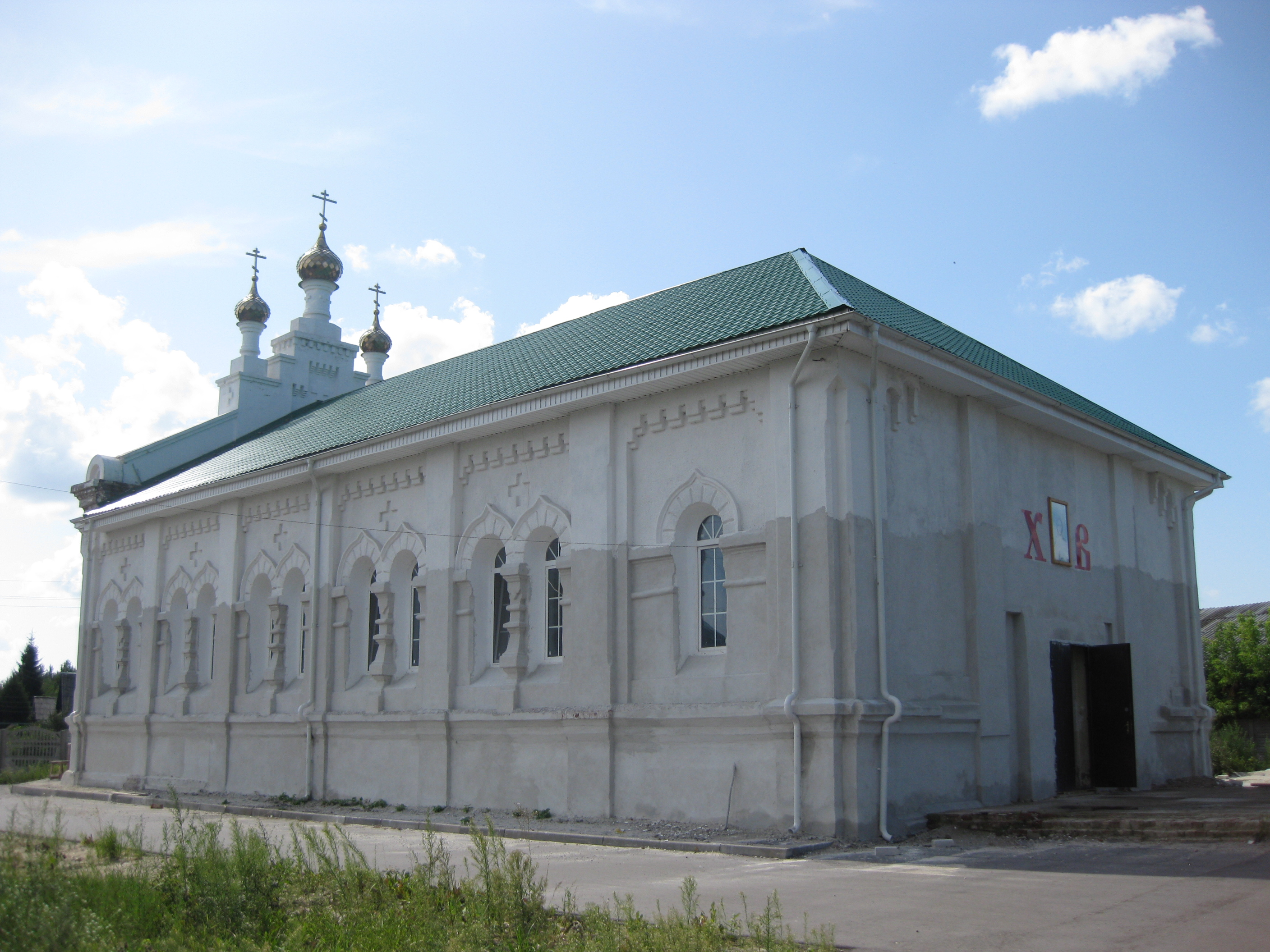
- Interactive map of Maloye Kozino
- Location of Maloye Kozino Maloye Kozino (Nizhny Novgorod Oblast)
- Coordinates: 56.4392°N 43.6710°E
- Country: Russia
- Federal subject: Nizhny Novgorod Oblast
- Administrative district: Balakhninsky District

Population (2010 Census)
  - Total: 777
  - Estimate (2021): 932 (+19.9%)
- Time zone: UTC+3 (MSK)
- Postal code: 606400
- OKTMO ID: 22605158051

Maloye Kozino (Russian: Ма́лое Козино́) is an urban locality (an urban-type settlement) in Balakhninsky District of Nizhny Novgorod Oblast, Russia. Population: 777 (2010 census); 837 (2002 census); 7,044 (1989 Soviet census).
