= Yuganets =

Yuganets Юганец
- Urban-type settlement
- Interactive map of Yuganets
- Location of Yuganets Yuganets (Nizhny Novgorod Oblast)
- Coordinates: 56.2499°N 43.2305°E
- Country: Russia
- Federal subject: Nizhny Novgorod Oblast
- Administrative district: Volodarsky District
- Founded: 1932

Population (2010 Census)
  - Total: 2,923
  - Estimate (2025): 2,551 (−12.7%)
- Time zone: UTC+3 (MSK)
- Postal code: 606077
- OKTMO ID: 22631179051

Yuganets (Russian: Ю́ганец) is an urban locality (an urban-type settlement) in Volodarsky District of Nizhny Novgorod Oblast, Russia. Population: 2,923 (2010 census); 3,042 (2002 census); 3,494 (1989 Soviet census).
