= Pervoye Maya, Nizhny Novgorod Oblast =

Pervoye Maya Первое Мая
- Urban-type settlement
- Interactive map of Pervoye Maya
- Location of Pervoye Maya Pervoye Maya (Nizhny Novgorod Oblast)
- Coordinates: 56.4143°N 43.6527°E
- Country: Russia
- Federal subject: Nizhny Novgorod Oblast
- Administrative district: Balakhninsky District

Population (2010 Census)
  - Total: 2,135
  - Estimate (2021): 1,909 (−10.6%)
- Time zone: UTC+3 (MSK)
- Postal code: 606407
- OKTMO ID: 22605158061

Pervoye Maya (Russian: Пе́рвое Ма́я) is an urban locality (an urban-type settlement) in Balakhninsky District of Nizhny Novgorod Oblast, Russia. Population: 2,135 (2010 census); 2,210 (2002 census);
