= Lukino, Nizhny Novgorod Oblast =

Lukino Лукино
- Urban-type settlement
- Interactive map of Lukino
- Location of Lukino Lukino (Nizhny Novgorod Oblast)
- Coordinates: 56.4415°N 43.6337°E
- Country: Russia
- Federal subject: Nizhny Novgorod Oblast
- Administrative district: Balakhninsky District

Population (2010 Census)
  - Total: 3,515
  - Estimate (2021): 3,484 (−0.9%)
- Time zone: UTC+3 (MSK)
- Postal code: 606427
- OKTMO ID: 22605158056

Lukino (Russian: Лукино́) is an urban locality (an urban-type settlement) in Balakhninsky District of Nizhny Novgorod Oblast, Russia. Population: 3,515 (2010 census); 3,681 (2002 census);
