= Arya (urban-type settlement) =

Arya Арья
- Work settlement
- Interactive map of Arya
- Location of Arya Arya (Nizhny Novgorod Oblast)
- Coordinates: 57°29′28″N 45°58′05″E
- Country: Russia
- Federal subject: Nizhny Novgorod Oblast
- Administrative district: Urensky District
- Founded: 1933

Population (2010 Census)
  - Total: 5,015
  - Estimate (2025): 4,719 (−5.9%)

Municipal status
  - Municipal district: Urensky Municipal District
  - Urban settlement: Arya Work Settlement Urban Settlement
  - Capital of: Arya Work Settlement Urban Settlement
- Time zone: UTC+3 (MSK)
- Postal code: 606819
- OKTMO ID: 22654153051

Arya (Russian: Арья) is an urban locality (urban-type settlement) in Urensky District of Nizhny Novgorod Oblast, Russia. Population: 5,015 (2010 census); 5,016 (2002 census); 5,481 (1989 Soviet census).
