= Blizhne-Pesochnoye =

Blizhne-Pesochnoye Ближне-Песочное
- Urban-type settlement
- Interactive map of Blizhne-Pesochnoye
- Location of Blizhne-Pesochnoye Blizhne-Pesochnoye (Nizhny Novgorod Oblast)
- Coordinates: 55.3475°N 42.0812°E
- Country: Russia
- Federal subject: Nizhny Novgorod Oblast
- Elevation: 91 m (299 ft)

Population (2010 Census)
  - Total: 2,917
  - Estimate (2025): 2,902 (−0.5%)
- Time zone: UTC+3 (MSK)
- Postal code: 607044
- OKTMO ID: 22715000056

Blizhne-Pesochnoye (Russian: Бли́жне-Песо́чное) is an urban locality (an urban-type settlement) in Nizhny Novgorod Oblast, Russia. Population: 2,917 (2010 census); 2,679 (2002 census); 3,094 (1989 Soviet census).
