= Gavrilovka, Dzerzhinsk, Nizhny Novgorod Oblast =

Gavrilovka Гаври́ловка
- Urban-type settlement
- Interactive map of Gavrilovka
- Location of Gavrilovka Gavrilovka (Nizhny Novgorod Oblast)
- Coordinates: 56°13′46″N 43°42′43″E
- Country: Russia
- Federal subject: Nizhny Novgorod Oblast

Population (2010 Census)
  - Total: 803
  - Estimate (2021): 834 (+3.9%)
- Time zone: UTC+3 (MSK)
- Postal code: 606041
- OKTMO ID: 22721000056

Gavrilovka (Russian: Гаври́ловка) is an urban locality (a work settlement) under the administrative jurisdiction of the city of oblast significance of Dzerzhinsk in Nizhny Novgorod Oblast, Russia, located 28 kilometers (17 mi) west of Nizhny Novgorod. Population: 803 (2010 census); 712 (2002 census); 740 (1989 Soviet census).
