= Smolino, Nizhny Novgorod Oblast =

Smolino Смолино
- Urban-type settlement
- Interactive map of Smolino
- Location of Smolino Smolino (Nizhny Novgorod Oblast)
- Coordinates: 56.2756°N 43.0930°E
- Country: Russia
- Federal subject: Nizhny Novgorod Oblast
- Administrative district: Volodarsky District
- Founded: 1958

Population (2010 Census)
  - Total: 2,742
  - Estimate (2025): 2,353 (−14.2%)
- Time zone: UTC+3 (MSK)
- Postal code: 606081
- OKTMO ID: 22631170051

Smolino (Russian: Смо́лино) is an urban locality (an urban-type settlement) in Volodarsky District of Nizhny Novgorod Oblast, Russia. Population: 2,742 (2010 census); 2,911 (2002 census); 8,098 (1989 Soviet census).
