= Pervomayskoye, Amur Oblast =

Pervomayskoye Первомайское
- Selo
- Location within Amur Oblast Location within Russia
- Coordinates: 55°06′N 124°49′E
- Country: Russia
- Region: Amur Oblast
- District: Tyndinsky District
- Time zone: UTC+9:00

Pervomayskoye (Russian: Первомайское) is a rural locality (a selo) and the administrative center of Pervomaysky Selsoviet of Tyndinsky District, Amur Oblast, Russia. The population was 707 as of 2018. There are 11 streets.

== Geography ==
Pervomayskoye is located on the Tynda River, 12 km southeast of Tynda (the district's administrative centre) by road. Ametist is the nearest rural locality.
