= Imeni M. I. Kalinina =

Imeni M. I. Kalinina Имени М. И. Калинина
- Urban-type settlement
- Interactive map of Imeni M. I. Kalinina
- Location of Imeni M. I. Kalinina Imeni M. I. Kalinina (Nizhny Novgorod Oblast)
- Coordinates: 57.9944°N 45.1163°E
- Country: Russia
- Federal subject: Nizhny Novgorod Oblast
- Administrative district: Vetluzhsky District
- Founded: 20th century

Population (2010 Census)
  - Total: 2,332
  - Estimate (2025): 1,630 (−30.1%)
- Time zone: UTC+3 (MSK)
- Postal code: 606875
- OKTMO ID: 22618154051

Imeni M. I. Kalinina (Russian: и́мени М. И. Кали́нина) is an urban locality (an urban-type settlement) in Vetluzhsky District of Nizhny Novgorod Oblast, Russia. Population: 2,332 (2010 census); 2,796 (2002 census); 3,328 (1989 Soviet census).
