= Shaygino =

Shaygino Шайгино
- Urban-type settlement
- Interactive map of Shaygino
- Location of Shaygino Shaygino (Nizhny Novgorod Oblast)
- Coordinates: 57.7706°N 46.8591°E
- Country: Russia
- Federal subject: Nizhny Novgorod Oblast
- Administrative district: Tonshayevsky District
- Founded: 1927

Population (2010 Census)
  - Total: 1,012
  - Estimate (2025): 794 (−21.5%)
- Time zone: UTC+3 (MSK)
- Postal code: 606940
- OKTMO ID: 22653158051

Shaygino (Russian: Шайгино) is an urban locality (an urban-type settlement) in Tonshayevsky District of Nizhny Novgorod Oblast, Russia. Population: 1,012 (2010 census); 1,114 (2002 census); 1,509 (1989 Soviet census).
