= Syava =

Syava Сява
- Urban-type settlement
- Interactive map of Syava
- Location of Syava Syava (Nizhny Novgorod Oblast)
- Coordinates: 58.0179°N 46.3308°E
- Country: Russia
- Federal subject: Nizhny Novgorod Oblast

Population (2010 Census)
  - Total: 4,729
  - Estimate (2025): 2,251 (−52.4%)
- Time zone: UTC+3 (MSK)
- Postal code: 606903
- OKTMO ID: 22758000061

Syava (Russian: Ся́ва) is an urban locality (an urban-type settlement), in Nizhny Novgorod Oblast, Russia.

== Population ==
Population:

4,729 (2010 census);[1] 5,431 (2002 census);[4] 7,228 (1989 Soviet census).[5]
