= Shimorskoye =

Shimorskoye Шиморское
- Urban-type settlement
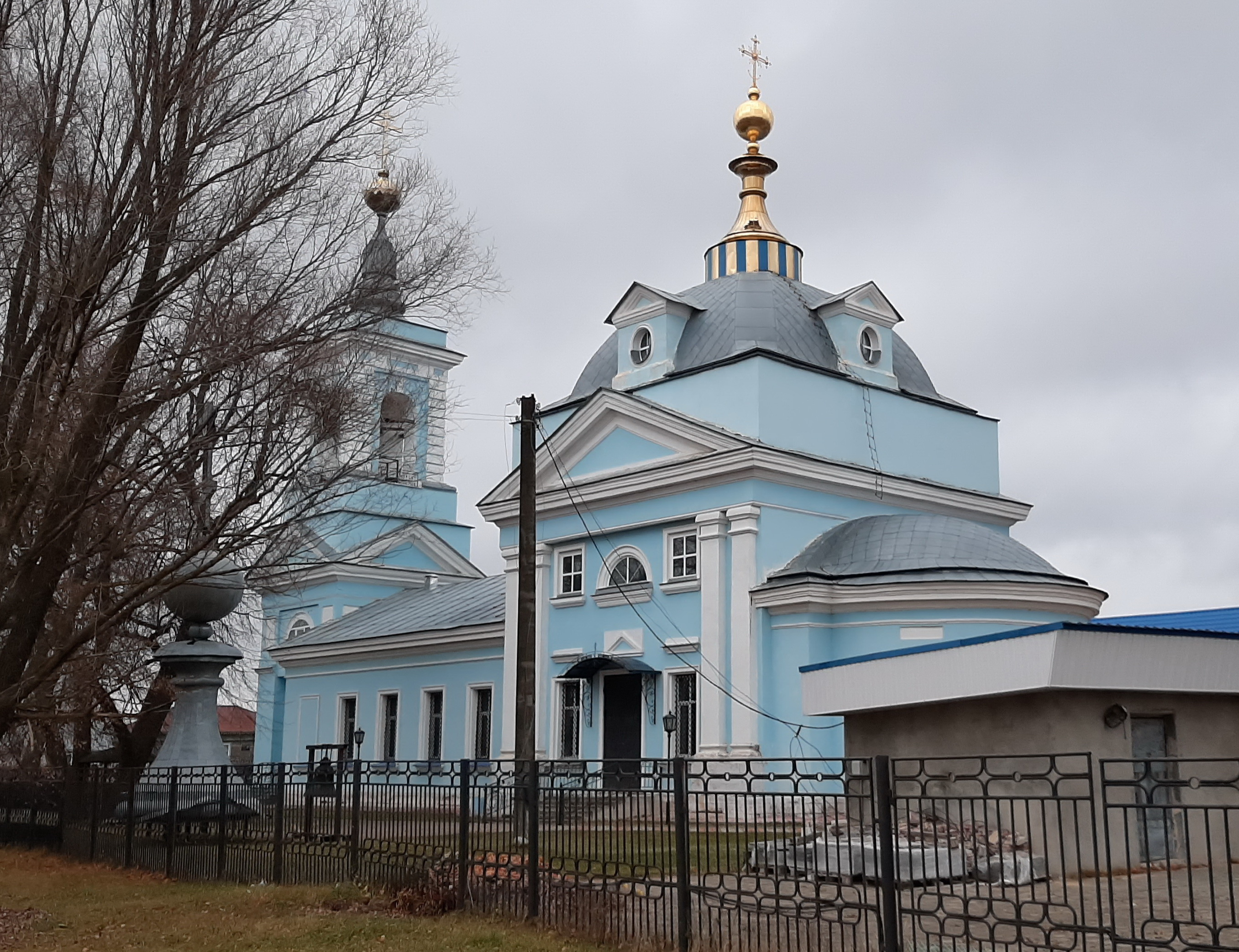
- Interactive map of Shimorskoye
- Location of Shimorskoye Shimorskoye (Nizhny Novgorod Oblast)
- Coordinates: 55.3280°N 42.0377°E
- Country: Russia
- Federal subject: Nizhny Novgorod Oblast

Population (2010 Census)
  - Total: 3,887
  - Estimate (2025): 3,952 (+1.7%)
- Time zone: UTC+3 (MSK)
- Postal code: 607036
- OKTMO ID: 22715000071

Shimorskoye (Russian: Ши́морское) is an urban locality (an urban-type settlement) in Nizhny Novgorod Oblast, Russia. Population: 3,887 (2010 census); 3,791 (2002 census); 4,266 (1989 Soviet census).
