= Ilyinogorsk =

Ilyinogorsk Ильиногорск
- Urban-type settlement
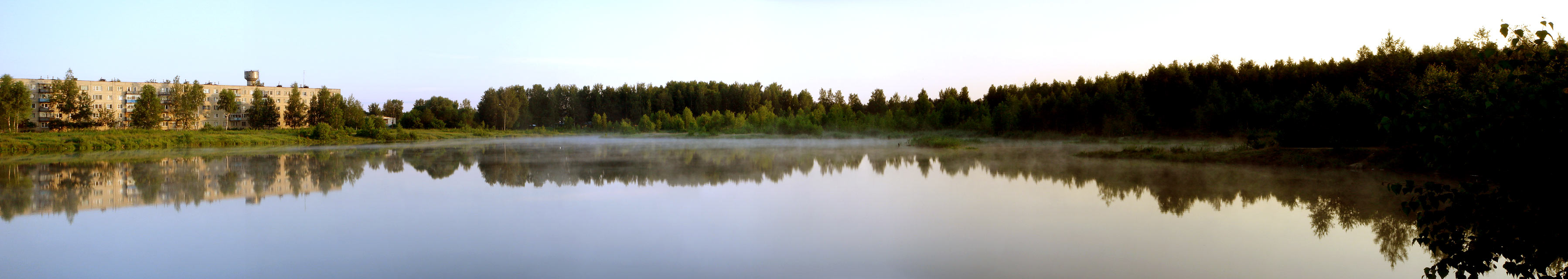
- Interactive map of Ilyinogorsk
- Location of Ilyinogorsk Ilyinogorsk (Nizhny Novgorod Oblast)
- Coordinates: 56.2272°N 42.9556°E
- Country: Russia
- Federal subject: Nizhny Novgorod Oblast
- Administrative district: Volodarsky District
- Founded: 1970

Population (2010 Census)
  - Total: 7,963
  - Estimate (2025): 6,016 (−24.5%)
- Time zone: UTC+3 (MSK)
- Postal code: 606058
- OKTMO ID: 22631160051

Ilyinogorsk (Russian: Ильиного́рск) is an urban locality (an urban-type settlement) in Volodarsky District of Nizhny Novgorod Oblast, Russia. Population: 7,963 (2010 census); 8,433 (2002 census); 8,065 (1989 Soviet census).
