= Zhyolnino =

Zhelnino Желнино
- Urban-type settlement
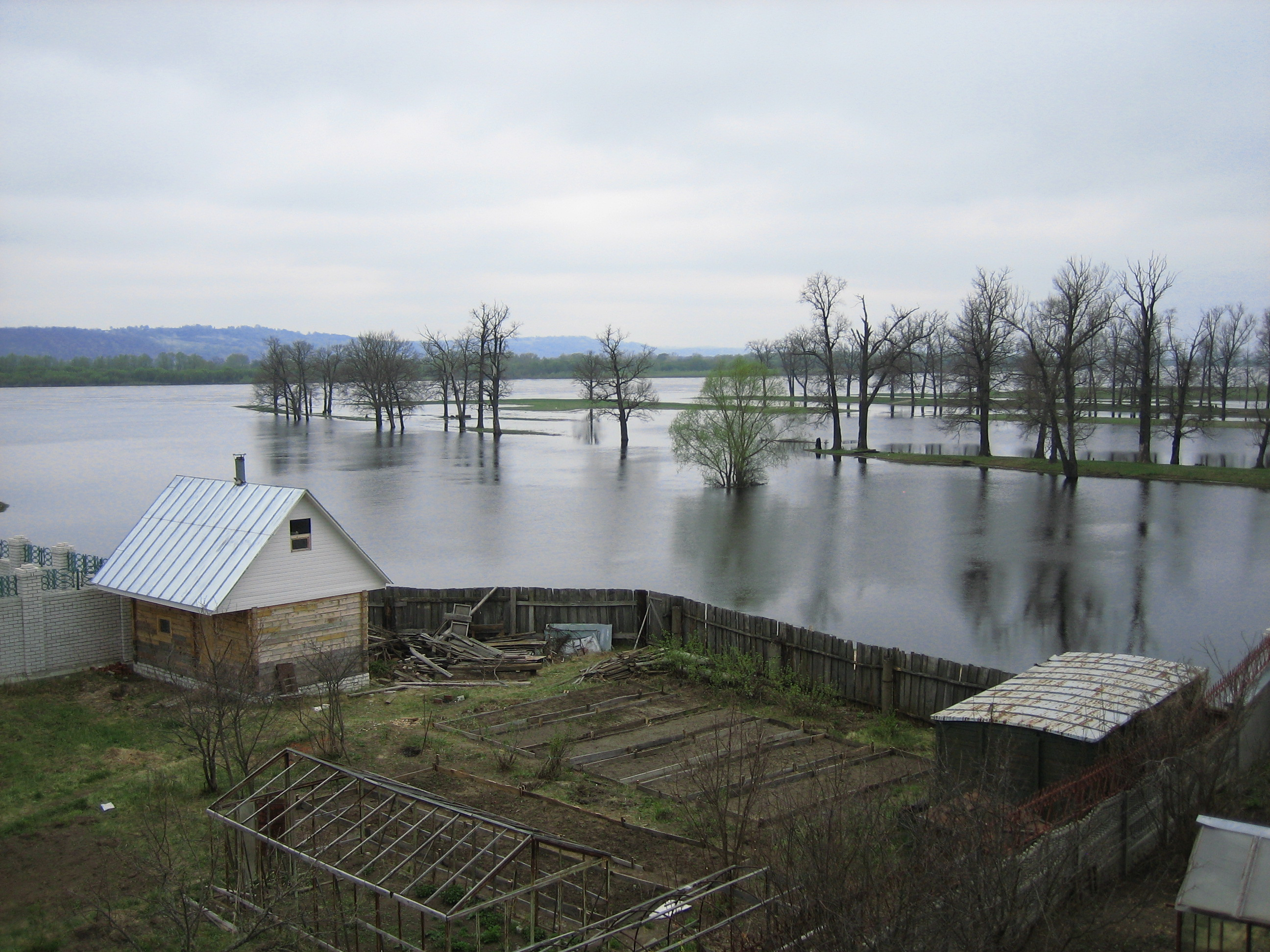
- Interactive map of Zhelnino
- Location of Zhelnino Zhelnino (Nizhny Novgorod Oblast)
- Coordinates: 56°12′10″N 43°21′55″E
- Country: Russia
- Federal subject: Nizhny Novgorod Oblast

Population (2010 Census)
  - Total: 896
  - Estimate (2021): 1,024 (+14.3%)
- Time zone: UTC+3 (MSK)
- Postal code: 606044
- OKTMO ID: 22721000066

Zhelnino (Russian: Желнино́) is an urban locality (a work settlement) under the administrative jurisdiction of the city of oblast significance of Dzerzhinsk in Nizhny Novgorod Oblast, Russia, located 40 kilometers (25 mi) west of Nizhny Novgorod and 2 kilometers (1.2 mi) southwest of Dzerzhinsk. Population: 896 (2010 census); 696 (2002 census); 1,112 (1989 Soviet census).
