= Frolishchi =

Urban locality in Nizhny Novgorod Oblast, Russia

Frolishchi Фролищи
- Urban-type settlement
- Interactive map of Frolishchi
- Location of Frolishchi Frolishchi (Nizhny Novgorod Oblast)
- Coordinates: 56.4221°N 42.6489°E
- Country: Russia
- Federal subject: Nizhny Novgorod Oblast
- Administrative district: Volodarsky District
- Founded: 1651

Population (2010 Census)
  - Total: 1,644
  - Estimate (2025): 1,111 (−32.4%)
- Time zone: UTC+3 (MSK)
- Postal code: 606091
- OKTMO ID: 22631173051

Frolishchi (Russian: Фроли́щи) is an urban locality (an urban-type settlement) in Volodarsky District of Nizhny Novgorod Oblast, Russia. Population: 1,644 (2010 census); 1,687 (2002 census); 2,046 (1989 Soviet census).
