= Mukhtolovo =

Mukhtolovo Мухтолово
- Urban-type settlement
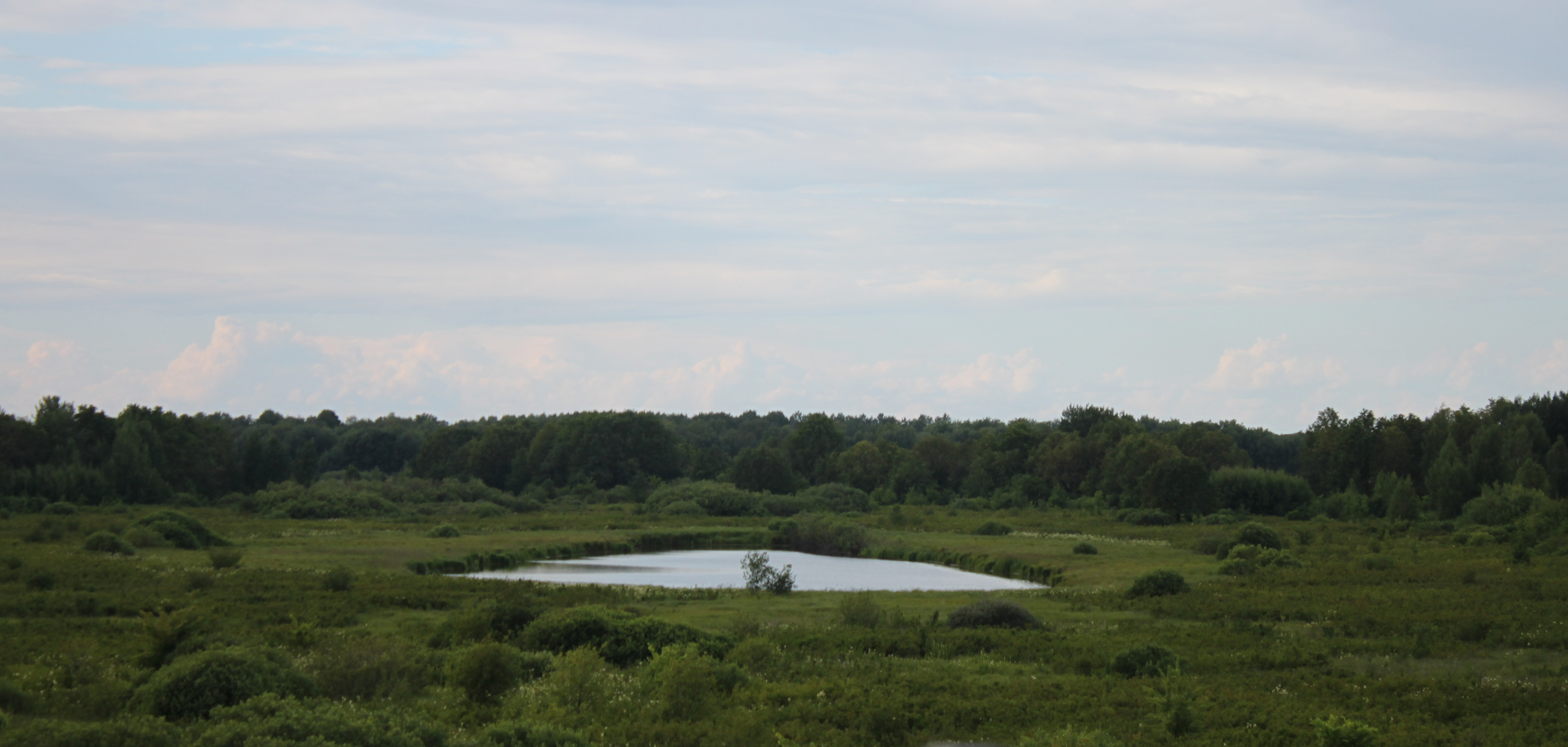
- Interactive map of Mukhtolovo
- Location of Mukhtolovo Mukhtolovo (Nizhny Novgorod Oblast)
- Coordinates: 55°28′N 43°12′E
- Country: Russia
- Federal subject: Nizhny Novgorod Oblast
- Administrative district: Ardatovsky District

Population (2010 Census)
  - Total: 5,005
  - Estimate (2025): 4,248 (−15.1%)
- Time zone: UTC+3 (MSK)
- Postal code: 607150
- OKTMO ID: 22602155051

Mukhtolovo (Russian: Мухто́лово) is an urban locality (a work settlement) in Ardatovsky District of Nizhny Novgorod Oblast, Russia, located 165 kilometers (103 mi) southwest of Nizhny Novgorod. Population: 5,005 (2010 census); 5,711 (2002 census); 5,868 (1989 Soviet census).
