= Imeni Stepana Razina =

Imeni Stepana Razina Имени Степана Разина
- Urban-type settlement
- Interactive map of Imeni Stepana Razina
- Location of Imeni Stepana Razina Imeni Stepana Razina (Nizhny Novgorod Oblast)
- Coordinates: 54.8915°N 44.2974°E
- Country: Russia
- Federal subject: Nizhny Novgorod Oblast
- Administrative district: Lukoyanovsky District
- Founded: 1910

Population (2010 Census)
  - Total: 2,760
  - Estimate (2025): 2,024 (−26.7%)
- Time zone: UTC+3 (MSK)
- Postal code: 607830
- OKTMO ID: 22639154051

Imeni Stepana Razina (Russian: И́мени Степа́на Ра́зина) is an urban locality (an urban-type settlement) in Lukoyanovsky District of Nizhny Novgorod Oblast, Russia. Population: 2,760 (2010 census); 3,177 (2002 census); 3,742 (1989 Soviet census).
