= Vakhtan =

Vakhtan Вахтан
- Urban-type settlement
- Interactive map of Vakhtan
- Location of Vakhtan Vakhtan (Nizhny Novgorod Oblast)
- Coordinates: 57.9640°N 46.6842°E
- Country: Russia
- Federal subject: Nizhny Novgorod Oblast

Population (2010 Census)
  - Total: 5,769
  - Estimate (2025): 3,375 (−41.5%)
- Time zone: UTC+3 (MSK)
- Postal code: 606900
- OKTMO ID: 22758000056

Vakhtan (Russian: Вахта́н) is an urban locality (an urban-type settlement) in Nizhny Novgorod Oblast, Russia. Population: 5,769 (2010 census); 6,641 (2002 census); 8,321 (1989 Soviet census).
