= Doschatoye =

Doschatoye Досчатое
- Urban-type settlement
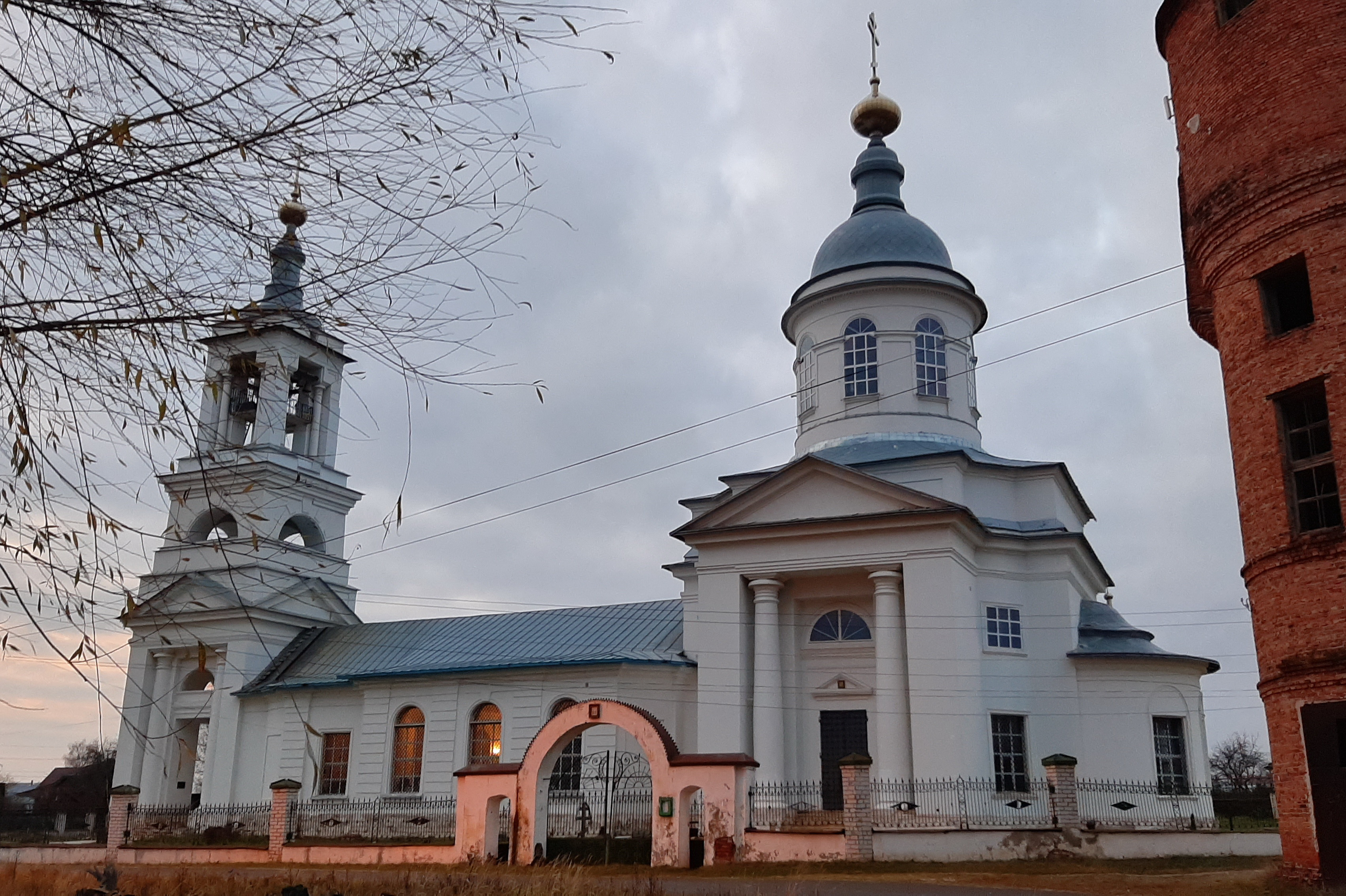
- Interactive map of Doschatoye
- Location of Doschatoye Doschatoye (Nizhny Novgorod Oblast)
- Coordinates: 55.3972°N 42.1040°E
- Country: Russia
- Federal subject: Nizhny Novgorod Oblast

Population (2010 Census)
  - Total: 6,217
  - Estimate (2025): 4,534 (−27.1%)
- Time zone: UTC+3 (MSK)
- Postal code: 607033
- OKTMO ID: 22715000066

Doschatoye (Russian: Досчáтое) is an urban locality (an urban-type settlement) in Nizhny Novgorod Oblast, Russia. Population: 5,217 (2010 census); 5,090 (2002 census); 5,066 (1989 Soviet census).
