= Ardatovsky District, Nizhny Novgorod Oblast =

Ardatovsky District Ардатовский район (Russian)
- District
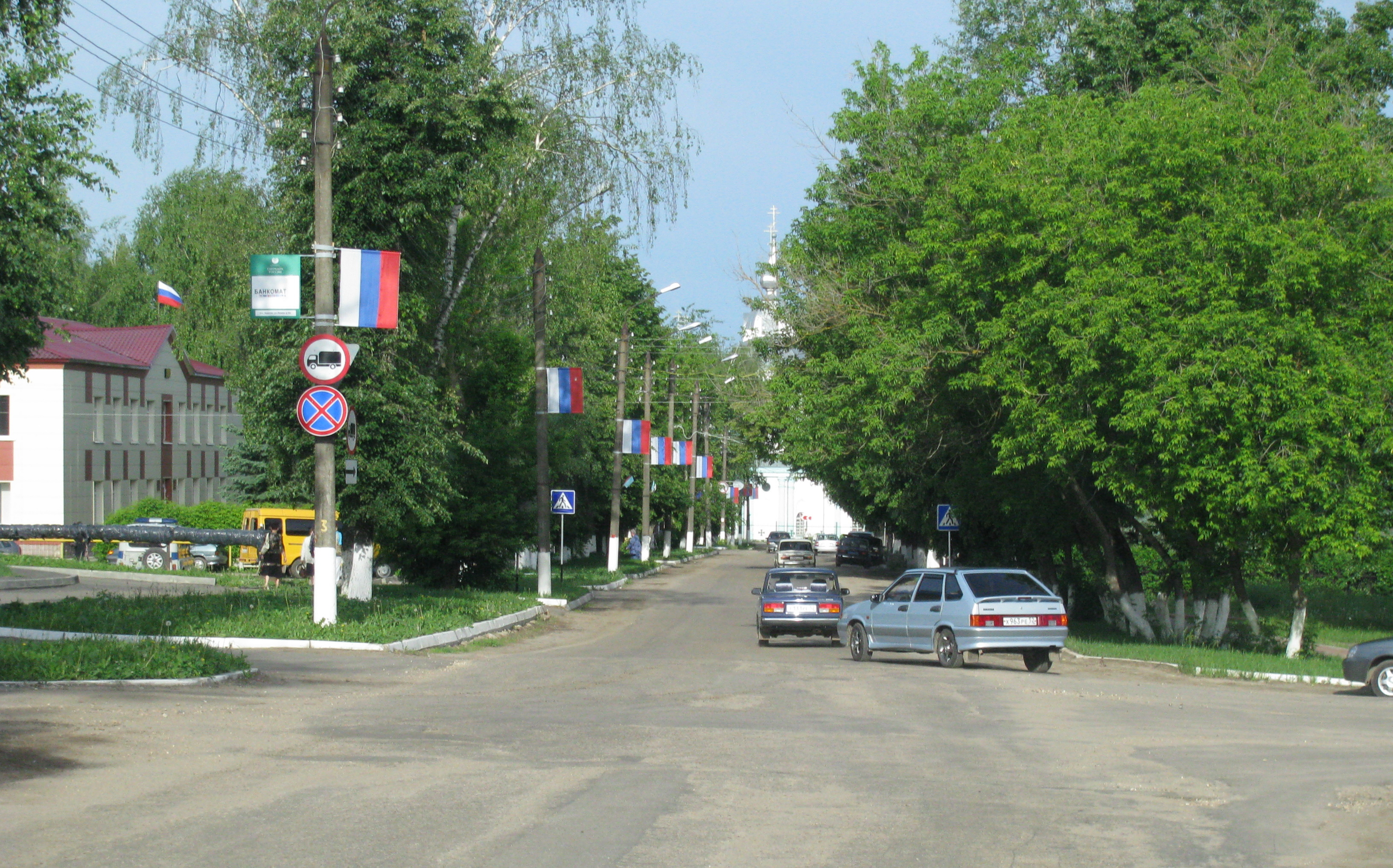
- Town of Ardatov, in Ardatovsky District

- Coat of arms
- Location of Ardatovsky District in Nizhny Novgorod Oblast
- Coordinates: 55°14′18″N 43°05′47″E
- Country: Russia
- Federal subject: Nizhny Novgorod Oblast
- Established: 1929
- Administrative center: Ardatov

Area
  - Total: 1,887.6 km^{2} (728.8 sq mi)

Population (2010 Census)
  - Total: 26,428
  - Density: 14.001/km^{2} (36.262/sq mi)
  - Urban: 55.1%
  - Rural: 44.9%

Administrative structure
  - Administrative divisions: 2 Work settlements, 7 Selsoviets
  - Inhabited localities: 2 urban-type settlements, 73 rural localities

Municipal structure
  - Municipally incorporated as: Ardatovsky Municipal District
  - Municipal divisions: 2 urban settlements, 7 rural settlements
- Time zone: UTC+3 (MSK)
- OKTMO ID: 22602000
- Website: http://adm-ardatov.ru

Ardatovsky District (Russian: Арда́товский райо́н) is an administrative district (raion), one of the forty in Nizhny Novgorod Oblast, Russia. Municipally, it is incorporated as Ardatovsky Municipal District. It is located in the southwest of the oblast. The area of the district is 1,887.6 square kilometers (728.8 sq mi). Its administrative center is the urban locality (a work settlement) of Ardatov. Population: 26,428 (2010 Census); 30,346 (2002 census); 32,361 (1989 Soviet census). The population of Ardatov accounts for 36.2% of the district's total population.

== History ==
The district was established in 1929.
