= Tumbotino =

Tumbotino Тумботино
- Urban-type settlement
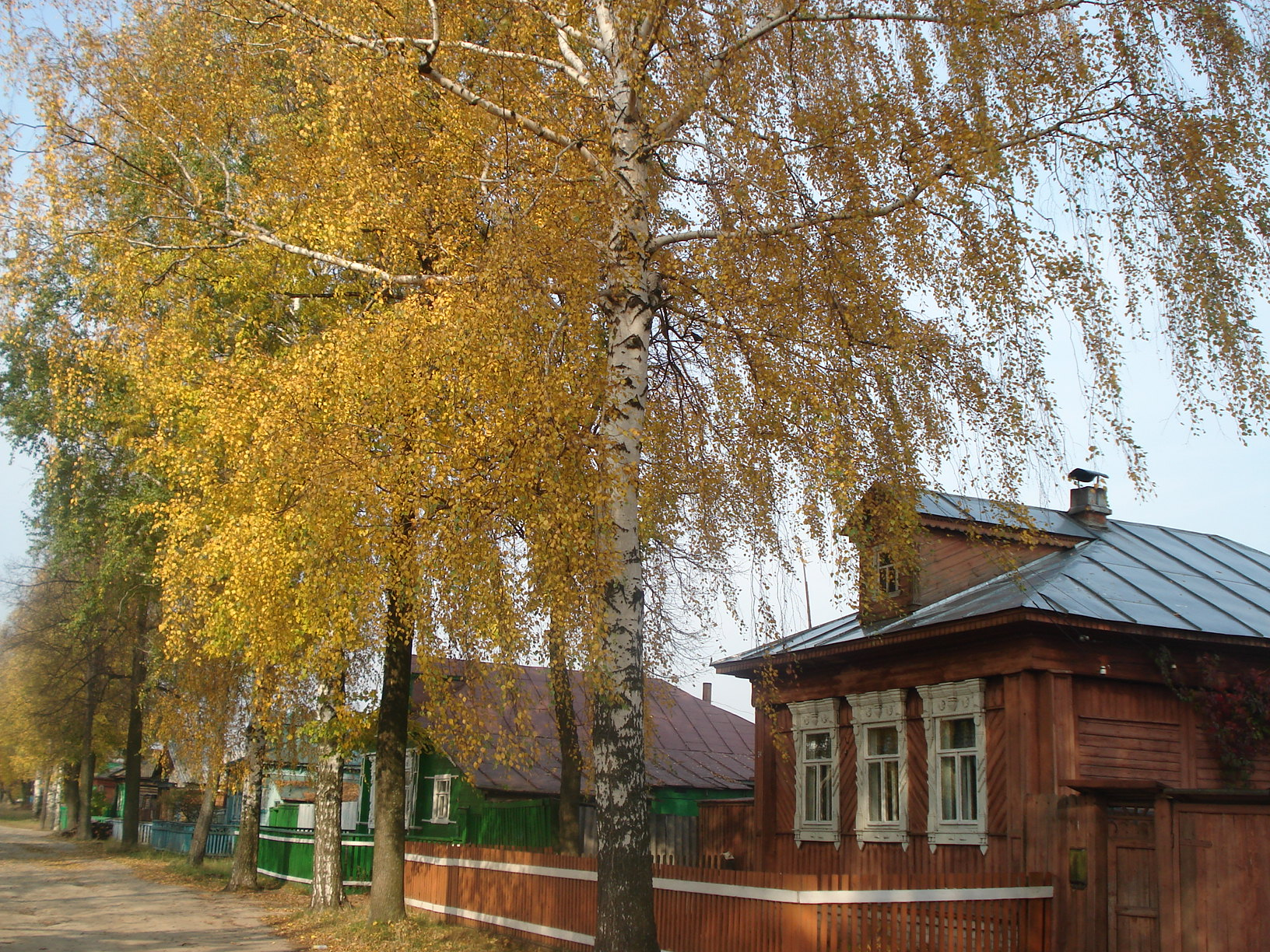
- Interactive map of Tumbotino
- Location of Tumbotino Tumbotino (Nizhny Novgorod Oblast)
- Coordinates: 55.9977°N 43.0237°E
- Country: Russia
- Federal subject: Nizhny Novgorod Oblast
- Administrative district: Pavlovsky District

Population (2010 Census)
  - Total: 7,300
  - Estimate (2025): 6,919 (−5.2%)
- Time zone: UTC+3 (MSK)
- Postal code: 606131
- OKTMO ID: 22642155051

Tumbotino (Russian: Ту́мботино) is an urban locality (an urban-type settlement) in Pavlovsky District of Nizhny Novgorod Oblast, Russia. Population: 7,300 (2010 census); 7,676 (2002 census); 8,000 (1989 Soviet census).
