= Vilya (urban-type settlement) =

Vilya Виля
- Urban-type settlement
- Interactive map of Vilya
- Location of Vilya Vilya (Nizhny Novgorod Oblast)
- Coordinates: 55.2483°N 42.2107°E
- Country: Russia
- Federal subject: Nizhny Novgorod Oblast
- Founded: 1798

Population (2010 Census)
  - Total: 3,344
  - Estimate (2025): 3,723 (+11.3%)
- Time zone: UTC+3 (MSK)
- Postal code: 607040
- OKTMO ID: 22715000061

Vilya (Russian: Ви́ля) is an urban locality (an urban-type settlement) in Nizhny Novgorod Oblast, Russia. Population: 3,344 (2010 census); 3,395 (2002 census); 3,821 (1989 Soviet census).
