= Pervomaysky, Gorodetsky District, Nizhny Novgorod Oblast =

Pervomaysky Первомайский
- Urban-type settlement
- Interactive map of Pervomaysky
- Location of Pervomaysky Pervomaysky (Nizhny Novgorod Oblast)
- Coordinates: 56.6134°N 43.3602°E
- Country: Russia
- Federal subject: Nizhny Novgorod Oblast
- Administrative district: Gorodetsky District
- Founded: 1932

Population (2010 Census)
  - Total: 1,470
  - Estimate (2025): 1,355 (−7.8%)
- Time zone: UTC+3 (MSK)
- Postal code: 606512
- OKTMO ID: 22628154051

Pervomaysky (Russian: Первома́йский) is an urban locality (an urban-type settlement) in Gorodetsky District of Nizhny Novgorod Oblast, Russia. Population: 1,470 (2010 census); 1,105 (2002 census); 1,136 (1989 Soviet census).
