= Gremyachevo =

Gremyachevo Гремячево
- Urban-type settlement
- Interactive map of Gremyachevo
- Location of Gremyachevo Gremyachevo (Nizhny Novgorod Oblast)
- Coordinates: 55.3901°N 43.0284°E
- Country: Russia
- Federal subject: Nizhny Novgorod Oblast

Population (2010 Census)
  - Total: 5,262
  - Estimate (2025): 4,401 (−16.4%)
- Time zone: UTC+3 (MSK)
- Postal code: 607022
- OKTMO ID: 22727000061

Gremyachevo (Russian: Гремя́чево) is an urban locality (an urban-type settlement) in Nizhny Novgorod Oblast, Russia. Population: 5,262 (2010 census); 5,303 (2002 census); 5,335 (1989 Soviet census).
