= Balakhna =

Town in Nizhny Novgorod Oblast, Russia

Balakhna Балахна
- Town
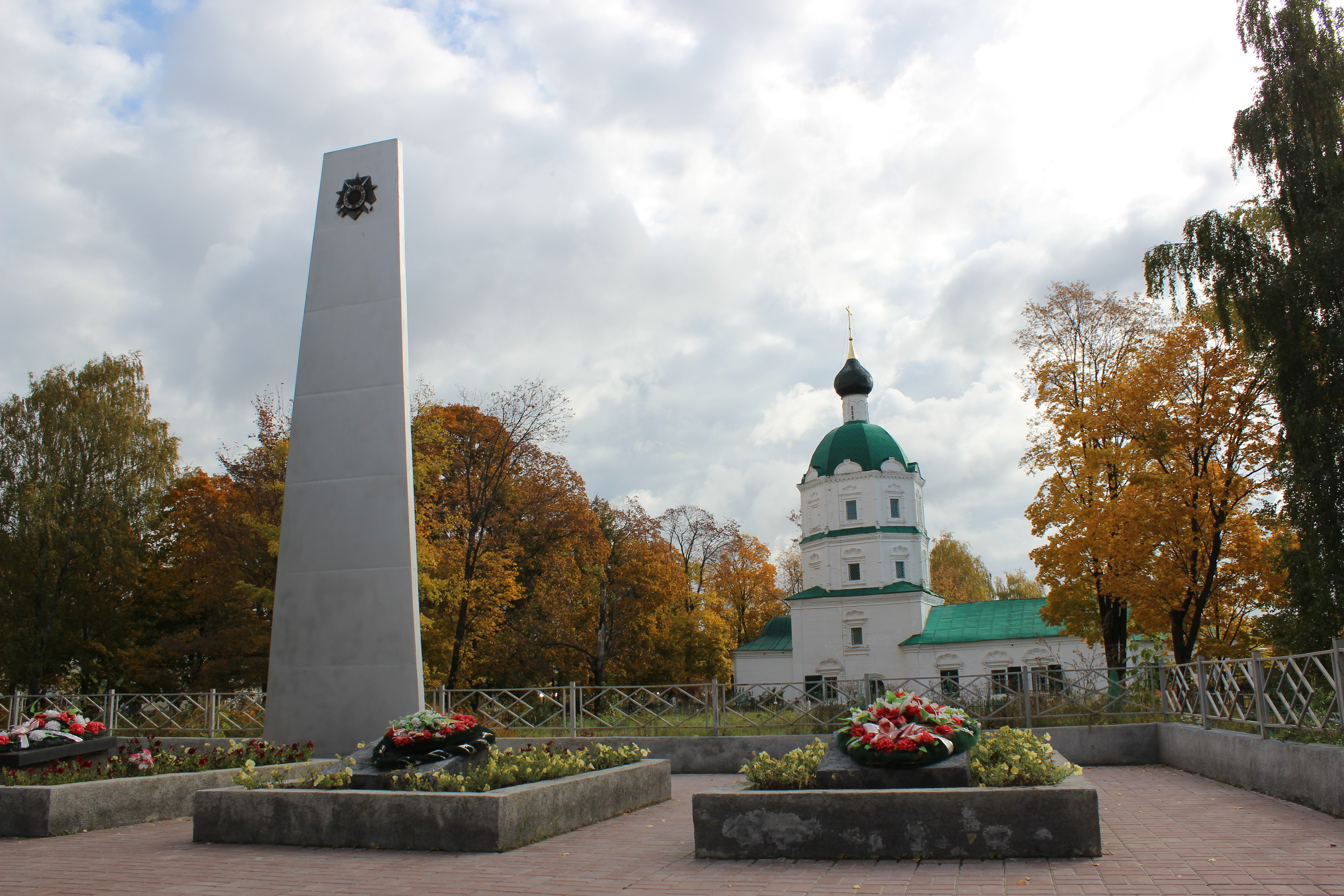

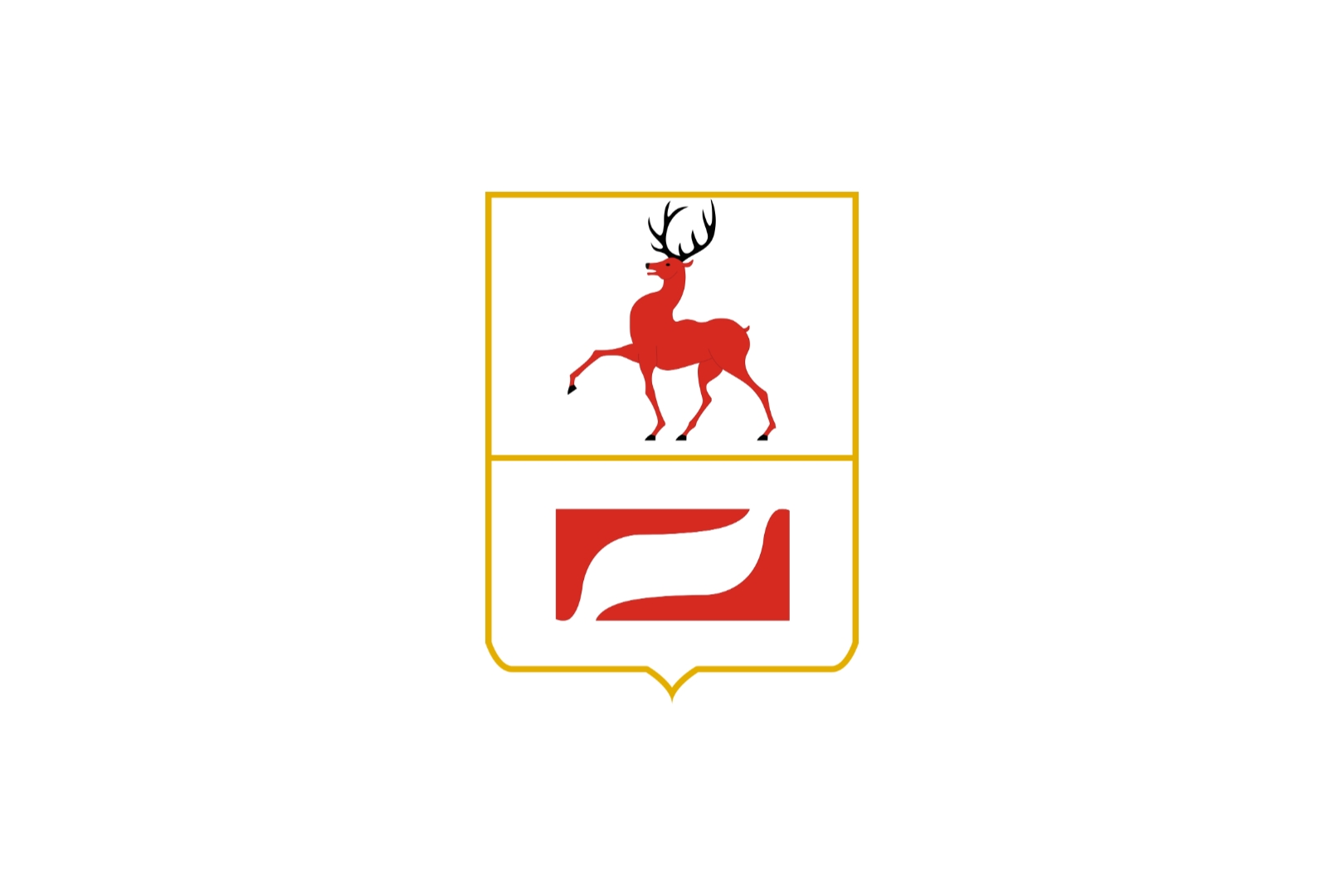
- Flag Coat of arms
- Interactive map of Balakhna
- Location of Balakhna Balakhna (Nizhny Novgorod Oblast)
- Coordinates: 56°28′N 43°36′E
- Country: Russia
- Federal subject: Nizhny Novgorod Oblast
- Administrative district: Balakhninsky District
- Town of district significanceSelsoviet: Balakhna
- Founded: 1474
- Elevation: 75 m (246 ft)

Population (2010 Census)
  - Total: 51,519
  - Estimate (2025): 46,915 (−8.9%)
  - Rank: 315th in 2010

Administrative status
  - Capital of: Balakhninsky District, town of district significance of Balakhna

Municipal status
  - Municipal district: Balakhninsky Municipal District
  - Urban settlement: Balakhna Urban Settlement
  - Capital of: Balakhninsky Municipal District, Balakhna Urban Settlement
- Time zone: UTC+3 (MSK)
- Postal codes: 606400, 606402, 606403, 606407, 606408, 606429
- OKTMO ID: 22505000001
- Website: balakhna.nobl.ru

Balakhna (Russian: Балахна́) is a town and the administrative center of Balakhninsky District in Nizhny Novgorod Oblast, Russia, located on the right bank of the Volga River, 32 kilometers (20 mi) north of Nizhny Novgorod, the administrative center of the oblast. Population: 51,519 (2010 census); 57,338 (2002 census); 32,133 (1989 Soviet census); 33,500 (1968).

It was previously known as Sol-na-Gorodtse.

== Overview ==
It was founded in 1474 as Sol-na-Gorodtse (Соль-на-Городце). After the Khan of Kazan razed it to the ground in 1536, a wooden fort was constructed to protect the settlement against further Tatar incursions. For the following three centuries, Balakhna prospered as a center of saltworks and grain trade. By the Time of Troubles, it was the twelfth largest city in Russia.

Adam Olearius visited and described the town in 1636. That year several shipwrights from Holstein built the first Russian ships here, thus establishing Balakhna as a foremost center of national river shipbuilding. The people of Balakhna were also reputed for their skills in knitting and making colored tiles, which were used for decoration of the Savior Church (1668) and other local temples. Balakhna is one of the few Russian cities shown on the 1689 Amsterdam World Map (labeled Balaghna).

The northwestern part of Balakhna is known as Pravdinsk. It used to be a separate urban-type settlement before it was merged into Balakhna in 1993. The settlement was named after the Moscow Pravda newspaper, which at some point may have been the largest consumer of newsprint produced at the local paper mill.

== Administrative and municipal status ==
Within the framework of administrative divisions, Balakhna serves as the administrative center of Balakhninsky District. As an administrative division, it is incorporated within Balakhninsky District as the town of district significance of Balakhna. As a municipal division, the town of district significance of Balakhna is incorporated within Balakhninsky Municipal District as Balakhna Urban Settlement.

== Religion and culture ==
The oldest structure in the city (and in the whole region) is the tentlike church of St. Nicholas (1552). Of all the tentlike churches built in brick, this is the nearest approach to their wooden prototypes. Another church, dating from the 17th century, houses a municipal museum. The Nativity church (1675) represents an archaic monumental type of monastery cathedral. Nearby is a statue of Kuzma Minin, who was born in Balakhna.

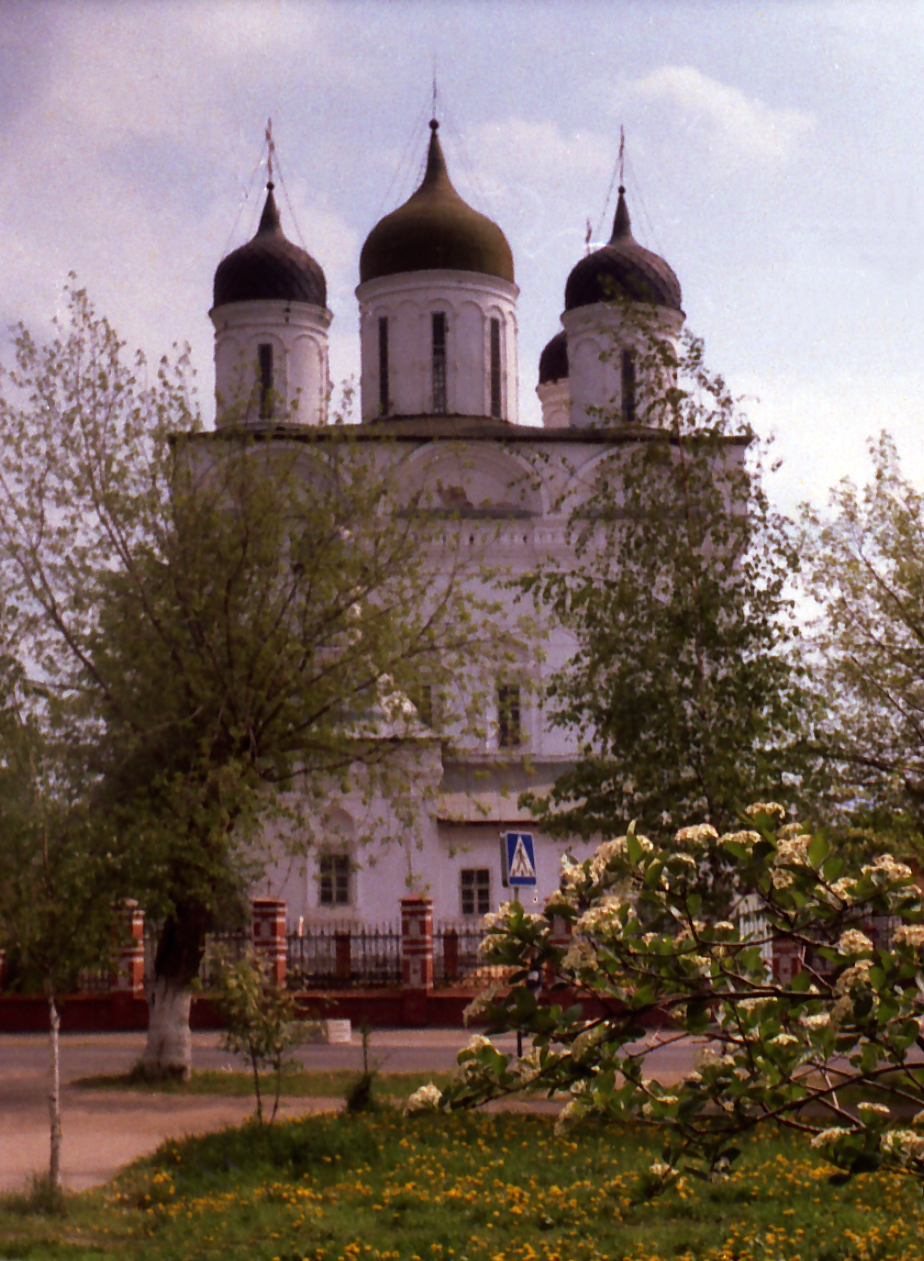
Nativity Church

== Sport ==
It has a youth bandy team called FOK Olimpiyskiy.
