= Veletma =

Veletma Велетьма
- Urban-type settlement
- Interactive map of Veletma
- Location of Veletma Veletma (Nizhny Novgorod Oblast)
- Coordinates: 55.3354°N 42.4213°E
- Country: Russia
- Federal subject: Nizhny Novgorod Oblast
- Elevation: 118 m (387 ft)

Population (2010 Census)
  - Total: 1,020
  - Estimate (2020): 957 (−6.2%)
- Time zone: UTC+3 (MSK)
- Postal code: 607001
- OKTMO ID: 22727000056

Veletma (Russian: Веле́тьма) is an urban locality (an urban-type settlement) in Nizhny Novgorod Oblast, Russia.

Population: 1,020 (2010 census); 1,198 (2002 census); 1,480 (1989 Soviet census).
