= Volodarsky District, Nizhny Novgorod Oblast =

Volodarsky District Володарский район (Russian)
- District
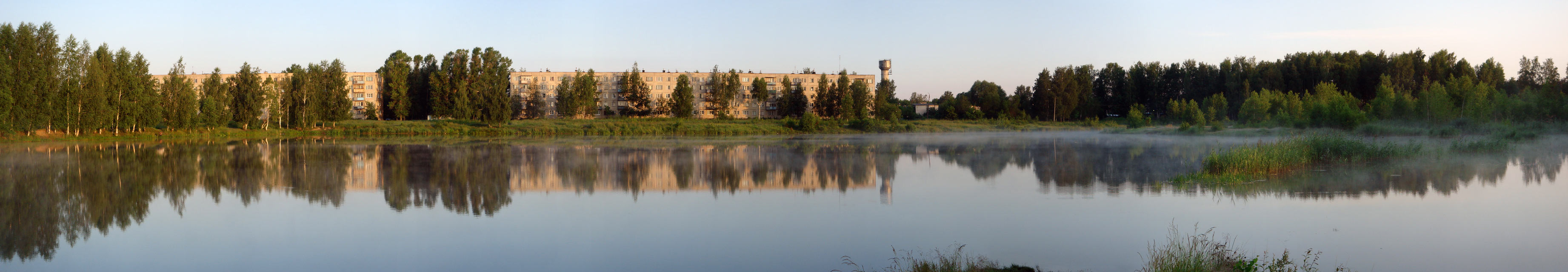
- A lake in Ilyinogorsk, Volodarsky District

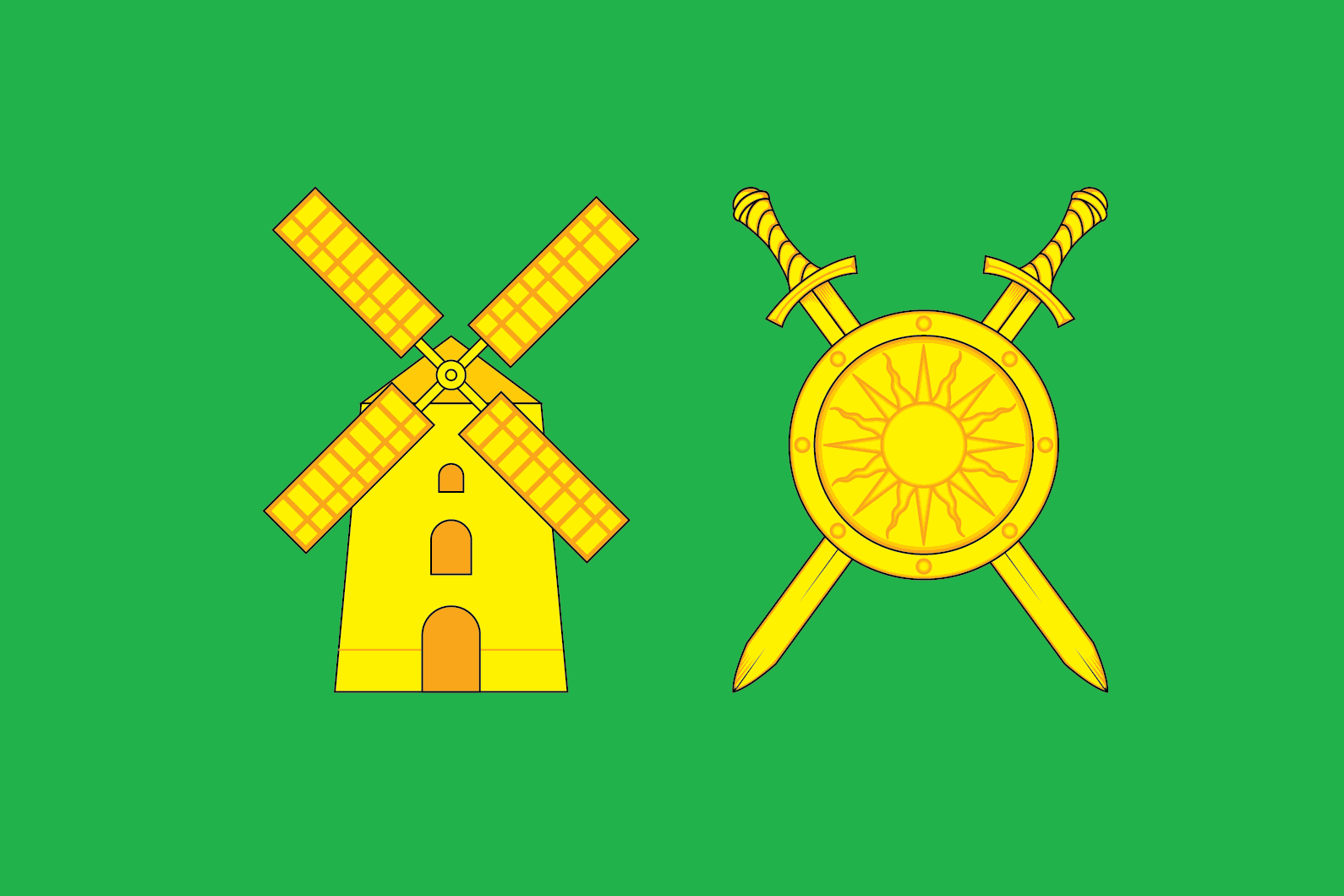
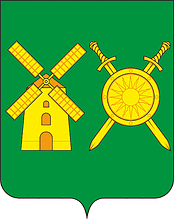
- Flag Coat of arms
- Location of Volodarsky District in Nizhny Novgorod Oblast
- Coordinates: 56°14′N 43°12′E
- Country: Russia
- Federal subject: Nizhny Novgorod Oblast
- Established: 1943
- Administrative center: Volodarsk

Area
  - Total: 1,045.6 km^{2} (403.7 sq mi)

Population (2010 Census)
  - Total: 58,807
  - Density: 56.242/km^{2} (145.67/sq mi)
  - Urban: 60.3%
  - Rural: 39.7%

Administrative structure
  - Administrative divisions: 1 Towns of district significance, 6 Work settlements, 4 Selsoviets
  - Inhabited localities: 1 cities/towns, 6 urban-type settlements, 25 rural localities

Municipal structure
  - Municipally incorporated as: Volodarsky Municipal District
  - Municipal divisions: 7 urban settlements, 4 rural settlements
- Time zone: UTC+3 (MSK)
- OKTMO ID: 22631000
- Website: http://www.volodarsk.omsu-nnov.ru

Volodarsky District (Russian: Волода́рский райо́н) is an administrative district (raion), one of the forty in Nizhny Novgorod Oblast, Russia. Municipally, it is incorporated as Volodarsky Municipal District. It is located in the west of the oblast. The area of the district is 1,045.6 square kilometers (403.7 sq mi). Its administrative center is the town of Volodarsk. Population: 58,807 (2010 Census); 59,498 (2002 census). The population of Volodarsk accounts for 16.9% of the district's total population.

== History ==
The district was established in 1943.
