= Balakhninsky District =

Balakhninsky District Балахнинский район (Russian)
- District
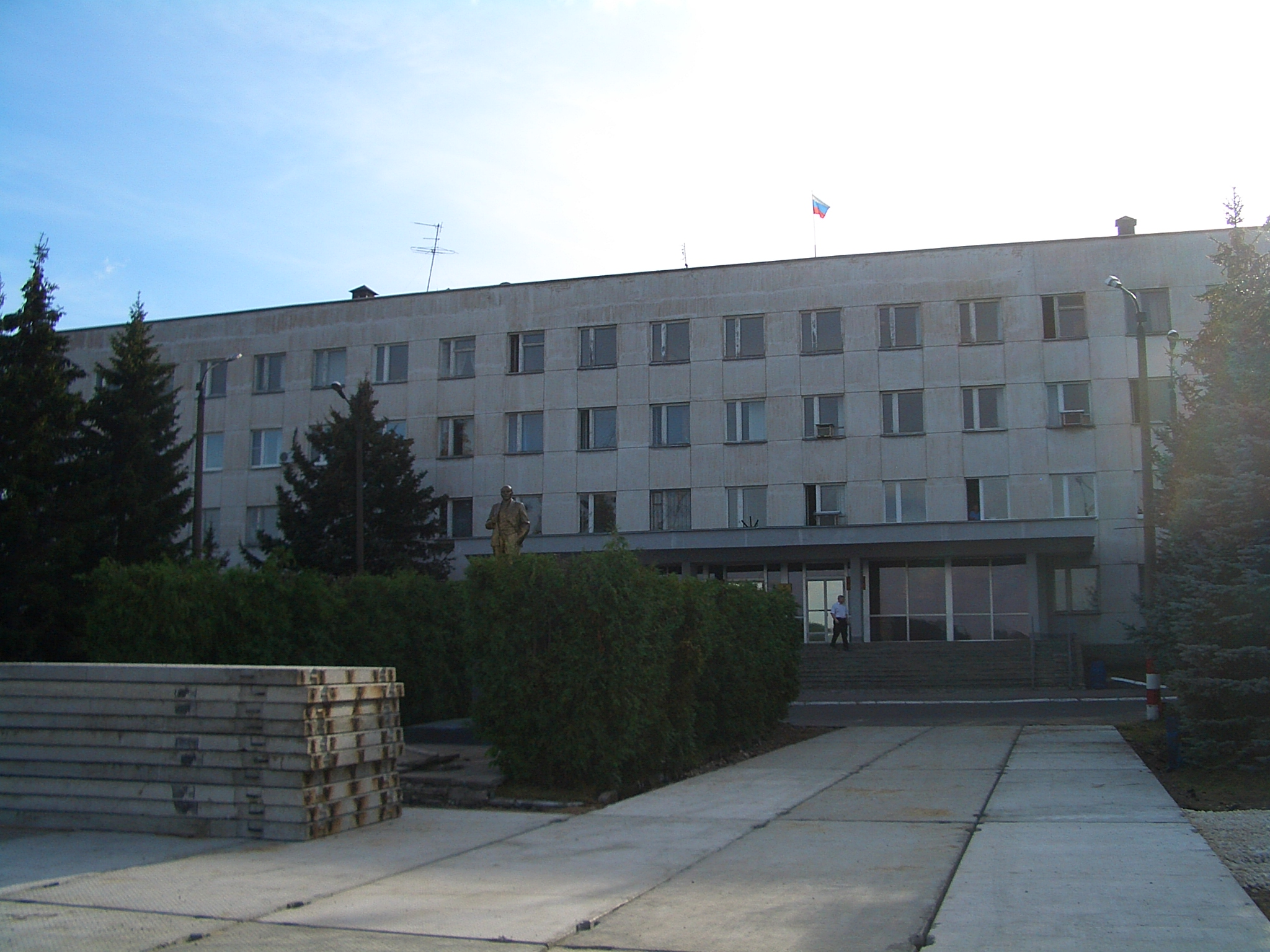
- Balakhninsky District Administration building in Balakhna

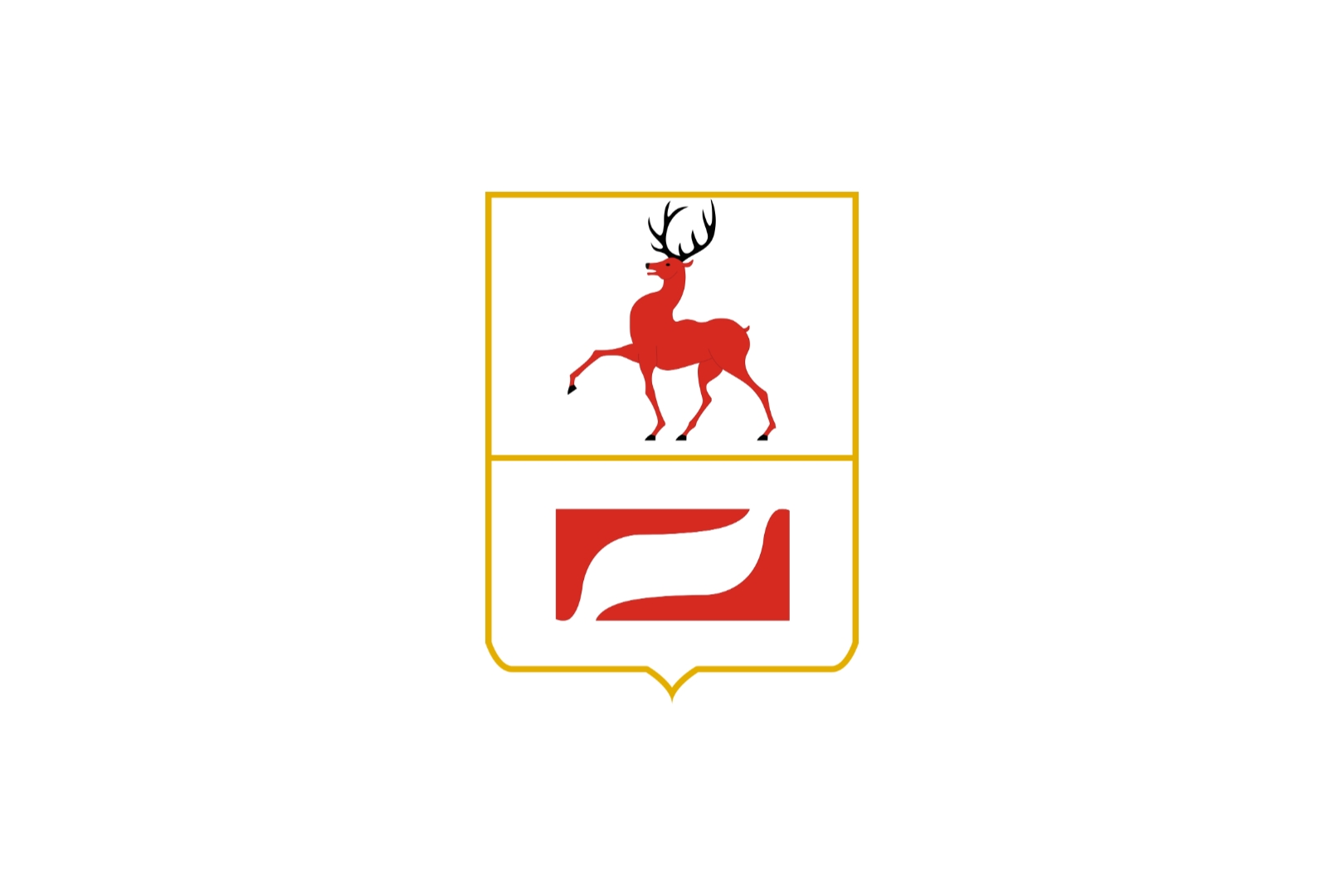
- Flag Coat of arms
- Location of Balakhninsky District in Nizhny Novgorod Oblast
- Coordinates: 56°30′N 43°36′E
- Country: Russia
- Federal subject: Nizhny Novgorod Oblast
- Established: 1929
- Administrative center: Balakhna

Area
  - Total: 958.2 km^{2} (370.0 sq mi)

Population (2010 Census)
  - Total: 77,598
  - Density: 80.98/km^{2} (209.7/sq mi)
  - Urban: 92.0%
  - Rural: 8.0%

Administrative structure
  - Administrative divisions: 1 Towns of district significance, 3 Work settlements, 3 Selsoviets
  - Inhabited localities: 1 cities/towns, 5 urban-type settlements, 40 rural localities

Municipal structure
  - Municipally incorporated as: Balakhninsky Municipal District
  - Municipal divisions: 4 urban settlements, 3 rural settlements
- Time zone: UTC+3 (MSK)
- OKTMO ID: 22605000
- Website: http://www.balakhna.nn.ru

Balakhninsky District (Russian: Балахни́нский райо́н) is an administrative district (raion), one of the forty in Nizhny Novgorod Oblast, Russia. Municipally, it is incorporated as Balakhninsky Municipal District. It is located in the west of the oblast. The area of the district is 958.2 square kilometers (370.0 sq mi). Its administrative center is the town of Balakhna. Population: 77,598 (2010 Census); 26,345 (2002 census); 60,487 (1989 Soviet census). The population of Balakhna accounts for 66.4% of the district's total population.

== History ==
The district was established in 1929.
