= Ivanovo-Voznesensk Governorate =

Ivanovo-Voznesensk Governorate Иваново-Вознесенская губерния
- Governorate of Russian SFSR
- 1918–1929
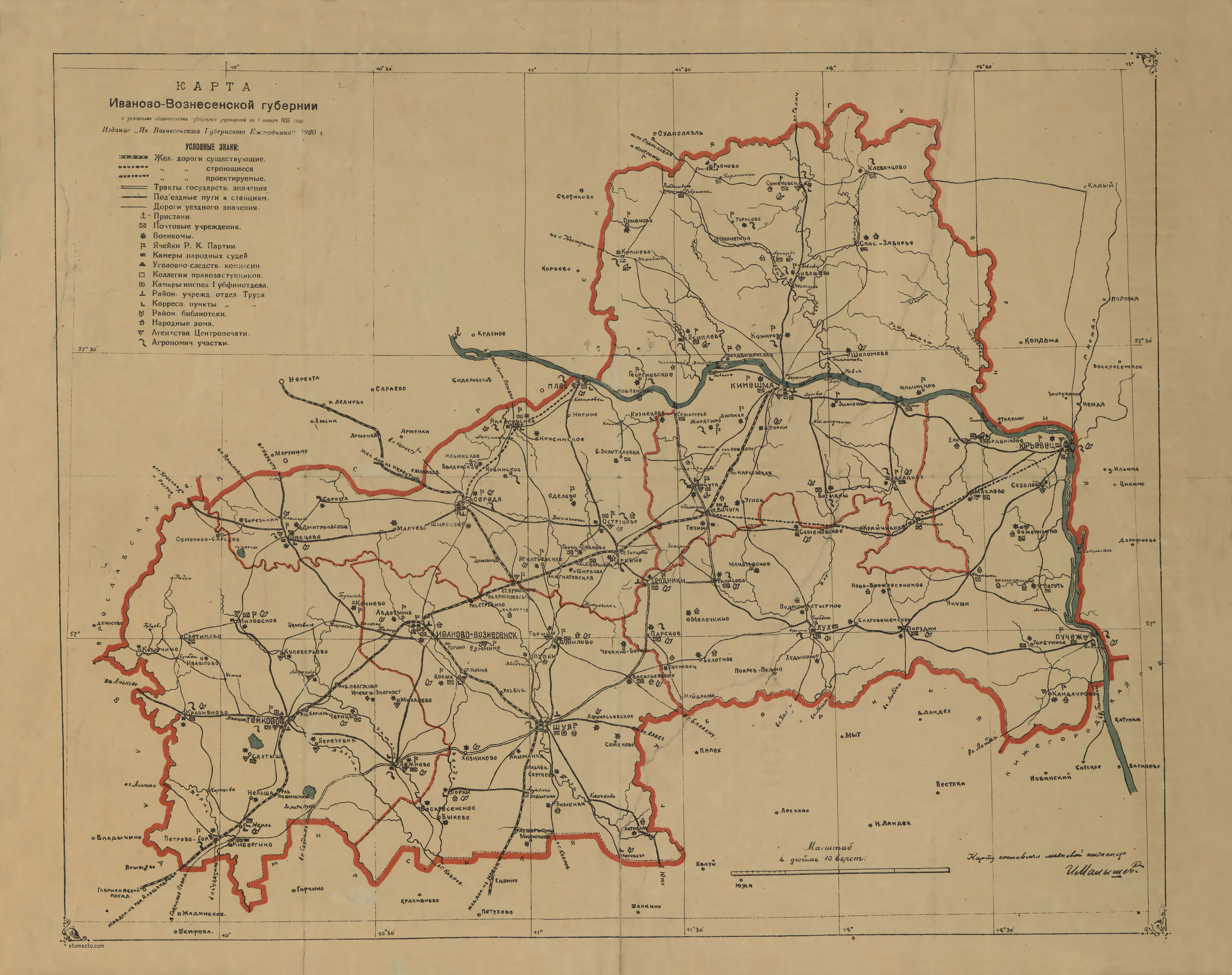
- Map of Ivanovo-Voznesensk Governorate (1920)
- Capital: Ivanovo-Voznesensk
- Area
  - 1926: 33,665 km^{2} (12,998 sq mi)
- Population
  - 1926: 1,195,804
- Historical era: Soviet period
  - Established: 20 June 1918
  - Abolished: 1 October 1929
- Political subdivisions: 8 uyezds, 2 districts (1926)
| Preceded by | Succeeded by |
| Vladimir Governorate; Kostroma Governorate | Ivanovo Industrial Oblast |
- Today part of: Russia

The Ivanovo-Voznesensk Governorate (Russian: Ива́ново-Вознесе́нская губе́рния, romanized: Ivanovo-Voznesenskaya guberniya) was a governorate (guberniya) of the Russian Soviet Federative Socialist Republic from 1918 to 1929. Its administrative center was Ivanovo-Voznesensk.

The governorate was established on 20 June 1918 from parts of Vladimir Governorate and Kostroma Governorate. It was abolished on 1 October 1929, and its territory was merged into the newly formed Ivanovo Industrial Oblast.

== History ==
=== Background and creation ===
Before 1917, the textile manufacturing area around Ivanovo-Voznesensk was divided between Vladimir Governorate to the south and Kostroma Governorate to the north. During the 1905 Russian Revolution, local workers established the Ivanovo-Voznesensk Soviet of Workers' Deputies.

After the October Revolution, local Bolsheviks led by Mikhail Frunze proposed uniting the textile district into a single administrative unit. On 20 June 1918, the Collegium of the People's Commissariat for Internal Affairs (NKVD) approved the creation of the governorate.

The governorate was formed from:

- Kineshemsky Uyezd, Yuryevetsky Uyezd, and 16 volosts of Nerekhtsky Uyezd from Kostroma Governorate;
- Shuysky Uyezd and parts of Kovrovsky and Suzdalsky uyezds from Vladimir Governorate.

These territories were organized into five initial uyezds: Kineshemsky, Seredsky, Shuysky, Teykovsky, and Yuryevetsky. Frunze was elected the first Chairman of the Governorate Executive Committee (Gubispolkom).

=== Administrative changes and abolition ===
Subsequent administrative changes included:

- 1921: Ivanovo-Voznesensky Uyezd was formed from parts of Seredsky, Shuysky, and Teykovsky uyezds.
- 1923: Makaryevsky Uyezd was transferred from Kostroma Governorate.
- 1924: Rodnikovsky District was established.
- 1925: Yuryev-Polsky Uyezd was transferred from Vladimir Governorate.
- 1926: Vichugsky District was established.

On 14 January 1929, the Presidium of the All-Russian Central Executive Committee (VTsIK) adopted a resolution abolishing the governorate system in the RSFSR. The Ivanovo-Voznesensk Governorate was dissolved on 1 October 1929, and its territory was merged with parts of Vladimir, Kostroma, and Yaroslavl Governorates into the Ivanovo Industrial Oblast.

== Administrative divisions ==
At the time of the 1926 Soviet census, the governorate comprised eight uyezds and two districts:

| Subdivision | Administrative center | Area (km²) | Total population (1926) | Center population (1926) |
|---|---|---|---|---|
| Ivanovo-Voznesensky Uyezd | Ivanovo-Voznesensk | 1,865 | 176,100 | 111,188 |
| Kineshemsky Uyezd | Kineshma | 4,700 | 172,600 | 33,704 |
| Makaryevsky Uyezd | Makaryev | 8,200 | 64,800 | 6,469 |
| Seredsky Uyezd | Sereda | 1,500 | 70,300 | 21,000 |
| Teykovsky Uyezd | Teykovo | 2,600 | 97,100 | 19,653 |
| Shuysky Uyezd | Shuya | 4,600 | 193,700 | 21,495 |
| Yuryevetsky Uyezd | Yuryevets | 5,500 | 180,100 | 9,300 |
| Yuryev-Polsky Uyezd | Yuryev-Polsky (town) | 3,000 | 127,818 | 9,262 |
| Vichugsky District | Vichuga | 1,000 | 66,038 | 8,915 |
| Rodnikovsky District | Rodniki | 700 | 47,155 | 5,242 |
| Total | Ivanovo-Voznesensk | 33,665 | 1,195,804 | 246,228 |

== Demographics and economy ==
According to the 1926 census, the population of the governorate was 1,195,804, of whom 99.3% were ethnic Russians. The urban population was 345,428 (28.9%), including 246,228 in the administrative centers and the remainder in factory settlements.

The economy was centered on textile production, including cotton spinning, weaving, printing, and linen manufacturing. Associated industries included dye production, machinery manufacturing, peat extraction, and forestry along the Volga and Unzha rivers.

== Leadership ==
Chairmen of the Executive Committee (Gubispolkom)

- Mikhail Frunze (1918)
- Isidor Lyubimov (1918–1919)
- Nikolay Kolotilov (1919–1920)
- Vasily Kudryashov (1920–1921)
- Nikolay Kolotilov (1921–1922)
- Aleksandr Grachyov (1925–1928)
- Dmitry Morozov (1928–1929)

Responsible Secretaries of the Governorate Party Committee (Gubkom)

- Mikhail Frunze (1918)
- Ivan Korotkov (1921–1923)
- Sergey Zorin (1923–1925)
- Nikolay Kolotilov (1925–1929)

== See also ==
- Ivanovo Oblast
- Ivanovo Industrial Oblast
