= Nizhegorodsky Uyezd =

Nizhegorodsky Uyezd Нижегородский уезд
- Uezd of Tsardom of Russia (1425–1714), Nizhny Novgorod Governorate (1714–1929)
- 1425–1929
- Coat of arms

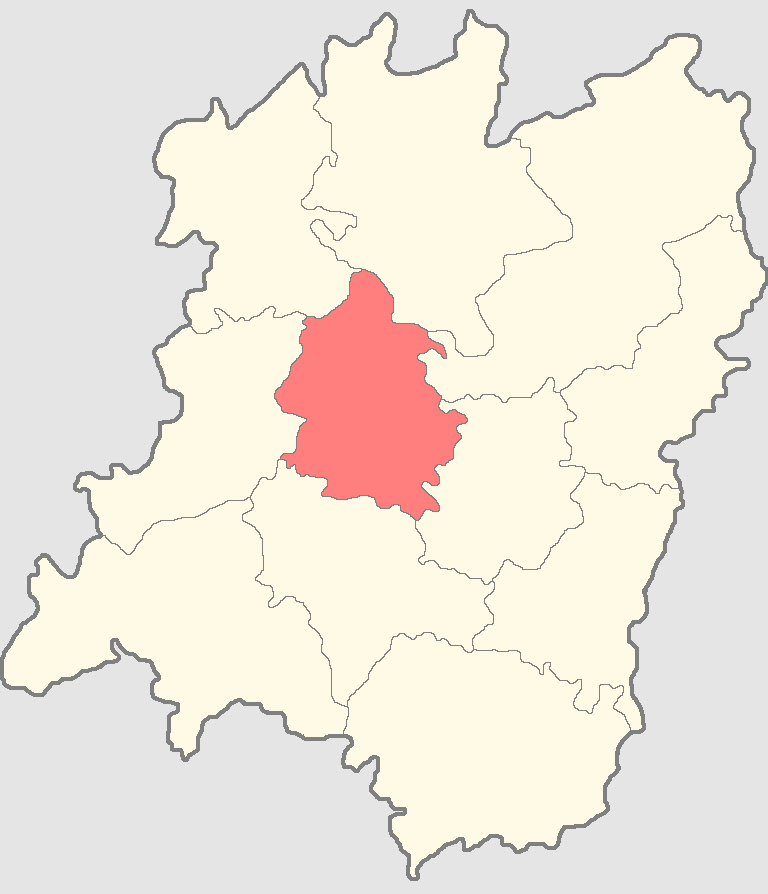
- Nizhegorodsky uezd on the Nizhny Novgorod Governorate map
- Capital: Nizhny Novgorod
- Legislature: City Duma
  - Upper house: City Duma of Nizhny Novgorod
- History
  - Established: 1425
  - Disestablished: 14 January 1929
| Preceded by | Succeeded by |
| Principality of Nizhny Novgorod-Suzdal | Nizhny Novgorod Urban Okrug |
- Today part of: Russia

Nizhegorodsky Uyezd (Russian: Нижегородский уезд) was one of the subdivisions of the Russian Tsardom (as an independent unit), the Nizhny Novgorod Governorate of the Russian Empire and the RSFSR, which existed from 1425 to 1929. The main city is Nizhny Novgorod.

== History ==
After the Nizhny Novgorod-Suzdal Grand Duchy finally became part of the Grand Duchy of Moscow in 1425, the administration of the territories began to be carried out on the basis of localism. The territories of the former principality adjacent to Nizhny Novgorod formed the Nizhny Novgorod Uezd, which bordered on the Galichsky, Kurmyshsky, Muromsky, Gorokhovetsky, Suzdalsky, Yuryevetsky, and later on the Kozmodemyansky, Alatyrsky, Arzamassky and Balakhninsky Uezds.

In the 1610s, volosts were formed. In 1680, the Duma clerk Larion Ivanov developed a document for Tsar Feodor III, revising the well-established boyar titles. In the presented list of titles, the governor of Nizhny Novgorod was among the 23 “power” titles, being in 15th place.

=== Reforms of Peter I ===
In 1708, the Nizhegorodsky Uezd was assigned to the Kazan Governorate, and in 1714 - to the Nizhny Novgorod Governorate.

In 1720, provinces were officially formed in Russia, including the Nizhny Novgorod province, which included the Nizhegorodsky, Balakhninsky and Yuryevetsky Uezds. According to Peter's plan, the province was to become the highest regional division, like the former county, but this decree did not cancel the division into provinces. This was due to the need for the existence of provinces as military districts. The provincial voivode was not subordinate to the governor.

In 1779, separate Semyonovsky, Makaryevsky, Knyagininsky, Gorbatovsky Uezds were separated from the Nizhegorodsky Uezd, some territories were transferred to Vasilsursky and Balakhna counties, and all of them became part of the Nizhny Novgorod Governorate.

== Demographics ==
At the time of the Russian Empire census of 1897, Nizhegorodsky Uyezd had a population of 222,033. Of these, 97.6% spoke Russian, 1.0% Yiddish, 0.4% Tatar, 0.4% Polish, 0.2% German, 0.1% Belarusian and 0.1% Ukrainian as their native language.
