= Vladimirsky Uyezd =

Vladimirsky Uyezd (Владимирский уезд) was one of the subdivisions of the Vladimir Governorate of the Russian Empire. It was situated in the central part of the governorate. Its administrative centre was Vladimir.

== Geography ==
Uyezd was located in the central part of Vladimir Province. It bordered Yuryevsky and Suzdalsky uyezds in the north, Kovrovsky uyezd in the east, Pokrovsky uyezd in the west and Sudogodsky uyezd in the south. The county covered an area of 2,402.5 versts² (2,734.1 km²). In 1926, after the liquidation of Suzdalsky and Sudogodsky uyezds, the area of the county was 6,717 km².

It was located on part of the territories of the modern Suzdalsky, Kameshkovsky, Sudogodsky, Sobinsky and Yuryev-Polsky districts of the Vladimir oblast.

== History ==
Vladimirsky uyezd formed in 1778 as part of Vladimir Vicegerency (since 1796 — Vladimir Governorate).

In 1924 the remaining volosts of the abolished Suzdalsky uyezd were included into the uyezd. In 1926 part of the territory of the disbanded Sudogodsky uyezd was annexed to the uyezd.

In 1929 the county was disbanded, and on its territory Vladimirsky, Stavrovsky, Suzdalsky and partially Sudogodsky districts were formed as part of the Vladimir district of the newly formed Ivanovo Industrial Region.

== Demographics ==
At the time of the Russian Empire Census of 1897, Vladimirsky Uyezd had a population of 160,996. Of these, 98.7% spoke Russian, 0.5% Polish, 0.3% Ukrainian, 0.3% Yiddish, 0.1% German, 0.1% Lithuanian and 0.1% Tatar as their native language.
