= Boris Kornilov =

Russian poet (1907–1938)

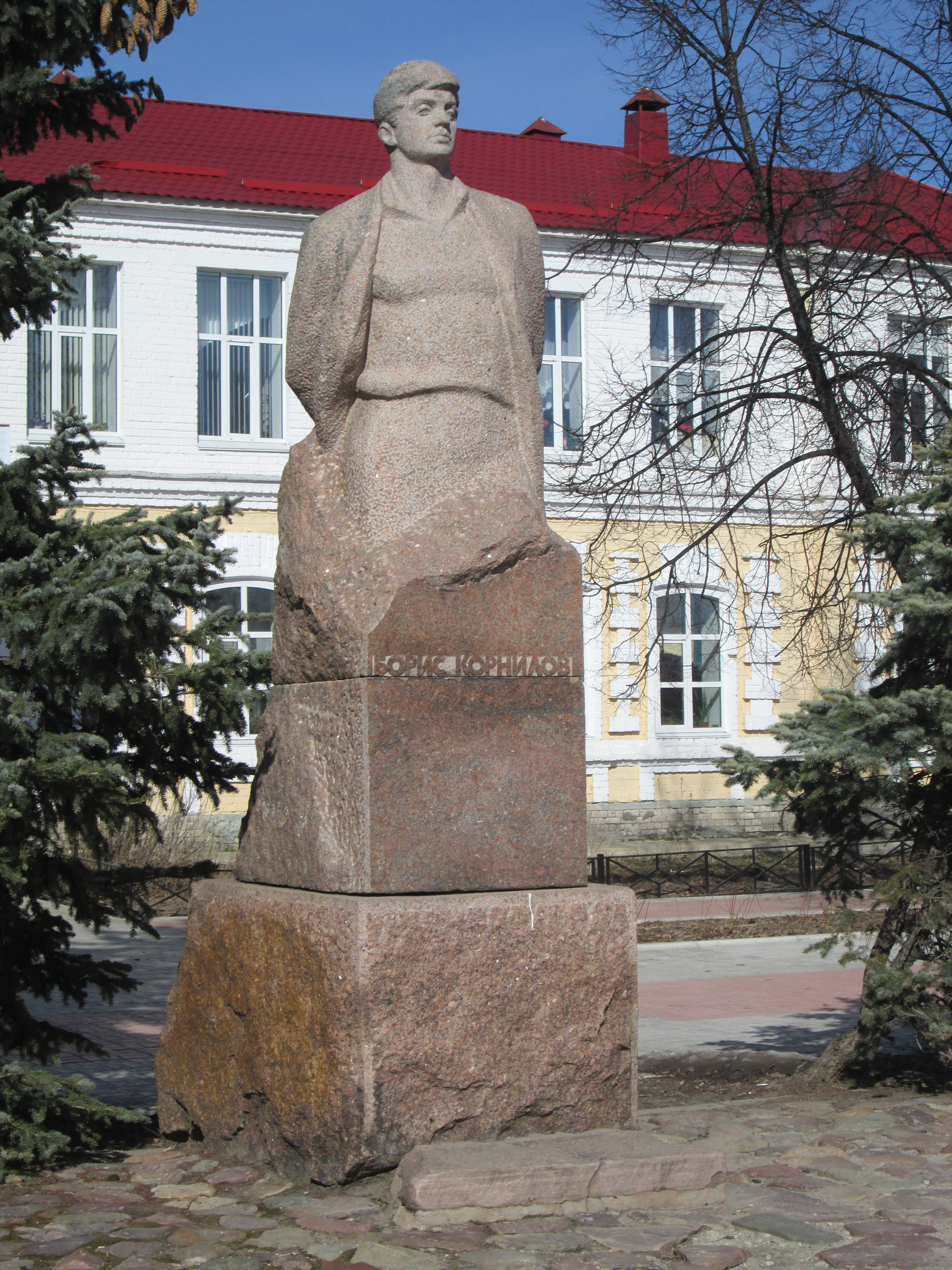
Monument to Boris Kornilov

Boris Petrovich Kornilov (Russian: Бори́с Петро́вич Корни́лов) (29 July 1907, in Pokrovskoye, Semyonovsky Uyezd, Nizhny Novgorod Governorate – 20 February 1938) was a Soviet, Russian poet. He is probably best known for penning the words to The Song of the Counterplan (Песня о встречном) which was used to open the morning radio broadcast throughout the Soviet Union, even for years after its author perished during the Great Purge.

Kornilov was arrested on 19 March 1937, sentenced to death on 20 February 1938 and shot in Leningrad the same day. Kornilov has been posthumously rehabilitated, and there is a museum and a statue dedicated to him in the town of Semyonov, near his birthplace. He was married to Olga Bergholz.
