= Mikhail Bestuzhev-Ryumin =

Russian noble (1801–1826)

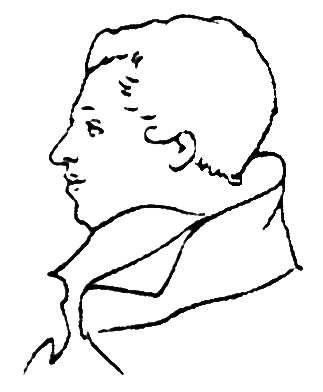
Portrait by A. Ivanovsky, 1820s

Mikhail Pavlovich Bestuzhev-Ryumin (Russian: Михаил Павлович Бестужев-Рюмин; 4 June [O.S. 23 May] 1801 – 25 July [O.S. 13 July] 1826) was a Russian officer, one of the organizers of the Decembrist revolt. He was the youngest of the five hanged Decembrists.

== Biography ==
Mikhail Bestuzhev-Ryumin was born in the village Kudryoshky (Кудрёшки) of Gorbatovsky Uyezd, Nizhny Novgorod Governorate (guberniya) on June 4, 1801 (according to other sources 1803). His father was the Mayor (городничий) of the town of Gorbatov, owner of 640 serfs and a muslin factory.

Despite his obscure position as a provincial mayor, Bestuzhev-Ryumin belonged to a branch of an ancient noble family (mentioned in chronicles since the 14th century), which included, among others, Count Alexey Bestuzhev-Ryumin (1693–1766) and Mikhail's nephew, historian Konstantin Bestuzhev-Ryumin.

Mikhail started his military career in 1818 at the Horse-guard regiment, then at the Semenovsky regiment. After the uprising of the Semenovsky regiment he was transferred to the Poltava infantry regiment. In 1824, he became a podporuchik.

In 1823, he joined the Southern Society of Decembrists and became one of the main assistants to Sergey Muravyov-Apostol on Vasilkovskaya Uprava of the South society. He was a participant in conferences of the Southern society in Kiev and Kamenka, and negotiated with secret Polish society. He was the author of the Decembrists' Proclamation that was read to the troops and local peasants. He also was known to dress in the clothes of lower classes and agitate people to revolt against the monarchy. Bestuzhev-Ryumin was the most extreme republican among the Decembrists; he insisted on the need to execute the Emperor and his entire family. At least four other members of the Bestuzhev family were involved in the Decembrist conspiracy.

On December 27, 1825, Mikhail was an assistant to Sergey Muravyov-Apostol, who headed the uprising of the Chernigov regiment. Mikhail was caught on January 3, 1826, and transferred to Saint Petersburg on January 20. He was one of the five sentenced to quartering, but later this sentence was replaced with hanging. He was executed at the Peter and Paul Fortress on July 25, 1826, and interred with the rest of the five in a secret grave on Goloday Island in Saint Petersburg.
