= Viktor Konstantinovich Vasilyev =

Russian and Soviet naval officer

- Born: 23 August [O.S. 11 August] 1887; Gorodets, Balakhninsky Uyezd, Nizhny Novgorod Governorate, Russian Empire
- Died: 23 September 1961 (aged 74) Leningrad, Soviet Union
- Buried: Serafimovskoe Cemetery
- Allegiance: Russian Empire; Soviet Union
- Branch: Imperial Russian Navy; Soviet Navy
- Service years: 1907–1948
- Rank: Rear-Admiral
- Awards: Soviet Union: Order of Lenin; Order of the Red Banner; Order of the Red Star; Russian Empire: Order of Saint Anna Third and Fourth Classes; Order of Saint Stanislaus Third Class; Order of Saint Vladimir Fourth Class

Viktor Konstantinovich Vasilyev (Russian: Виктор Константинович Васильев) (23 August [O.S. 11 August] 1887 – 23 September 1961) was an officer of the Imperial Russian and Soviet navies. He rose to the rank of rear-admiral.

Vasilyev studied at the Naval Engineering School and the Naval Cadet Corps before joining the Imperial Russian Navy on graduating in 1907. His early years were spent on cruisers in the Baltic and Black Sea Fleets, where he rose to the rank of lieutenant, specialising in navigation, and serving during the First World War. He remained in the navy after the Russian Revolution, carrying out studies and teaching duties at the Naval Academy. He combined this with senior strategic positions with in the navy's central command structure, as well as active service as with the Black Sea coast guard forces. Caught up in the periodic repressions of the time, he was subsequently reinstated and returned to the Navy Academy, where he rose to senior academic positions during the Second World War. He retired in 1948, having received awards from both the Imperial Russian and Soviet states during his career.

== Career ==
=== Imperial Russian Navy ===
Vasilyev was born on 23 August [O.S. 11 August] 1887 in Gorodets, in what was then Balakhninsky Uyezd, Nizhny Novgorod Governorate, in the Russian Empire. He studied two courses at the Naval Engineering School between September 1904 and December 1906, entering the Naval Cadet Corps in Saint Petersburg in April 1907. He graduated from the Corps in May 1910 as a midshipman, and went on to serve in the Baltic and Black Sea Fleets. Between December 1910 and August 1912, Vasilyev was the watch officer of the cruiser Pamiat Merkuria, and then the cruiser Rossia from August 1912 to May 1913. He returned to the Pamiat Merkuria in May 1913 as a junior navigator. He had been promoted to lieutenant on 6 April 1914 and saw action in the First World War. He completed the navigation officers' class in 1915 and was transferred to the destroyer Pospeshny in May of that year to serve as a navigator. In August 1916 Vasilyev returned to the Pamiat Merkuria as a senior navigator, a post he held until January 1917, when he became flag-navigator of a cruiser brigade. He held this position during the February Revolution in 1917, until January 1918, with a brief period as commander of an Elpidifor-class gunboat between March and April 1917.

=== Soviet Navy ===
Following the October Revolution, Vasilyev remained in the navy, by now the Workers' and Peasants' Red Fleet. He served as an engineer-instructor for the Main Naval Technical Directorate from January 1919 to July 1920, and was then part of the Naval Standing Commission from July to September 1920. He studied the Naval Academy's course between September 1920 and December 1921, and then became head of the navy's strategic department from December 1921 to January 1925. In January 1925 Vasilyev was appointed assistant chief of Naval Headquarters. From November 1925 until April 1926 he undertook further studies at the Naval Academy, and in April 1926 he became chief of staff of the Black Sea Coast Guard. He held this position until October 1929, with a brief period as commander between May and October 1926.

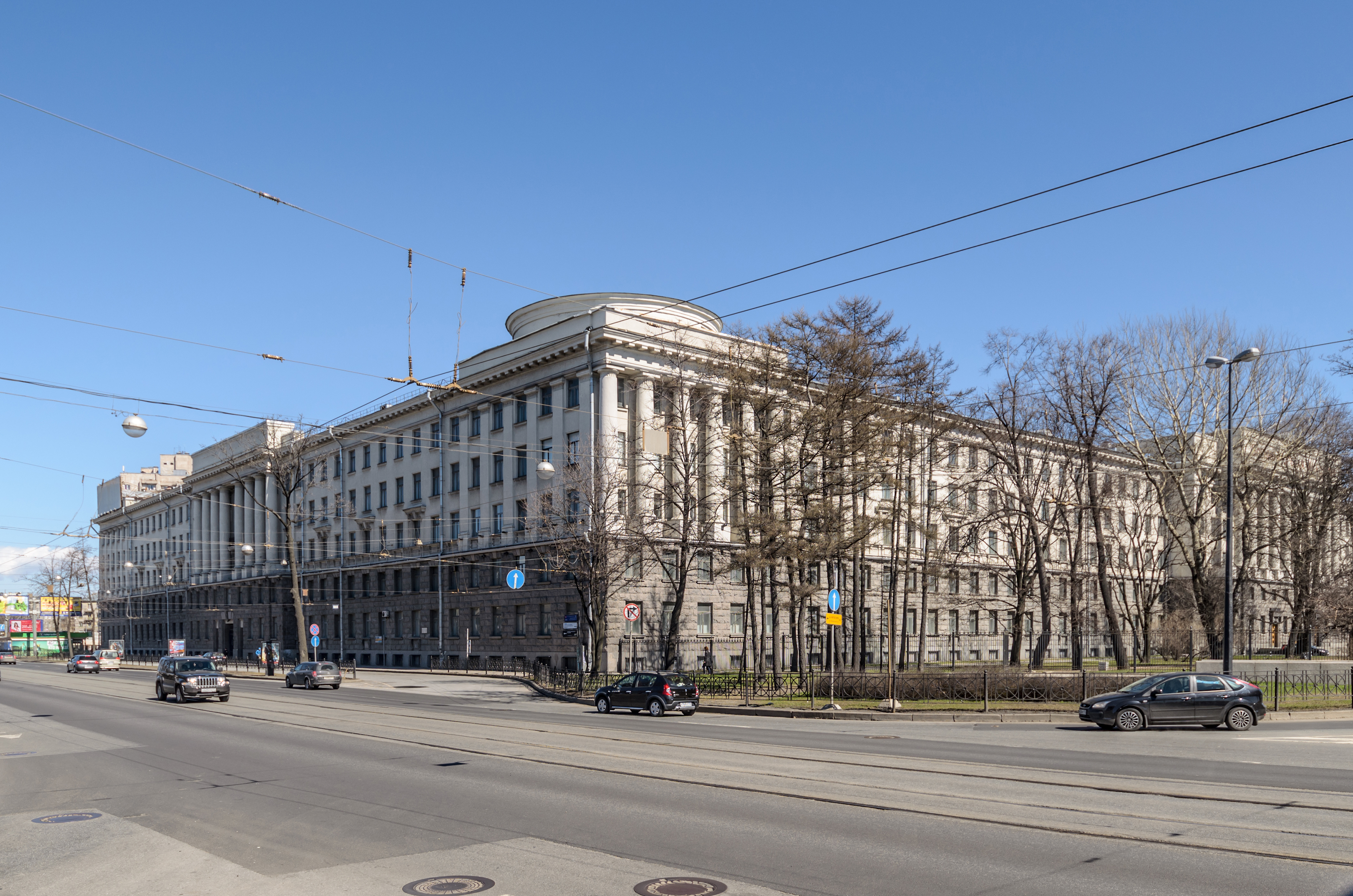
The Kuznetsov Naval Academy. Vasilyev both studied and taught here, becoming one of its senior academics.

Vasilyev returned to the Naval Academy in October 1929, this time as an instructor. He was caught up in one of the periods of repression shortly afterwards, being arrested and dismissed from the navy in March 1930. He was reinstated in January 1932, though not formally rehabilitated until 1938. He returned to the Naval Academy in January 1932 as a lecturer. He became a senior head in July 1935, and then head of the staff department in June 1938, becoming a docent that year. He held this position during the Second World War. He was promoted to rear-admiral on 4 June 1940, received his Candidate of Military Science in 1943, and became a senior head of the department in May 1945. He rose to the position of a head of course in September 1945, a post he held until his retirement in February 1948.

=== Death, and awards ===
Vasilyev died on 23 September 1961, and was buried in Leningrad's Serafimovskoe Cemetery. Over his career in the navy he had received awards from both the Imperial Russian and Soviet states. He had received the Russian Order of Saint Anna Third and Fourth Classes with swords and bow (the third class being awarded in 1916), the Order of Saint Stanislaus Third Class with swords and bow in 1915, and the Order of Saint Vladimir Fourth Class with swords and bow. From the Soviet state he received the Order of Lenin on 10 November 1945, the Order of the Red Banner on 3 November 1944, and the Order of the Red Star on 30 March 1944.
