= Rybin (surname) =

Rybin (Russian: Рыбин; Ukrainian: Рибін) is a surname. Notable people with the surname include:

- Aleksei Rybin, a lead guitarist for the Russian rock band Kino
- Georgy Rybin (1901–1974), Russian hуdrographer and explorer
- Maxim Rybin (born 1981), Russian professional ice hockey winger
- Ondřej Rybín (born 1993), Czech male track cyclist
- Ruslan Rybin (born 1992), Russian professional football player
- Vladislav Rybin (born 1978), Russian professional football player
- Volodymyr Rybin (born 1980), Ukrainian professional racing cyclist
- Yuriy Rybin (born 1963), Russian javelin thrower
