= Lukoyanovsky District =

Lukoyanovsky District Лукояновский район (Russian)
- District
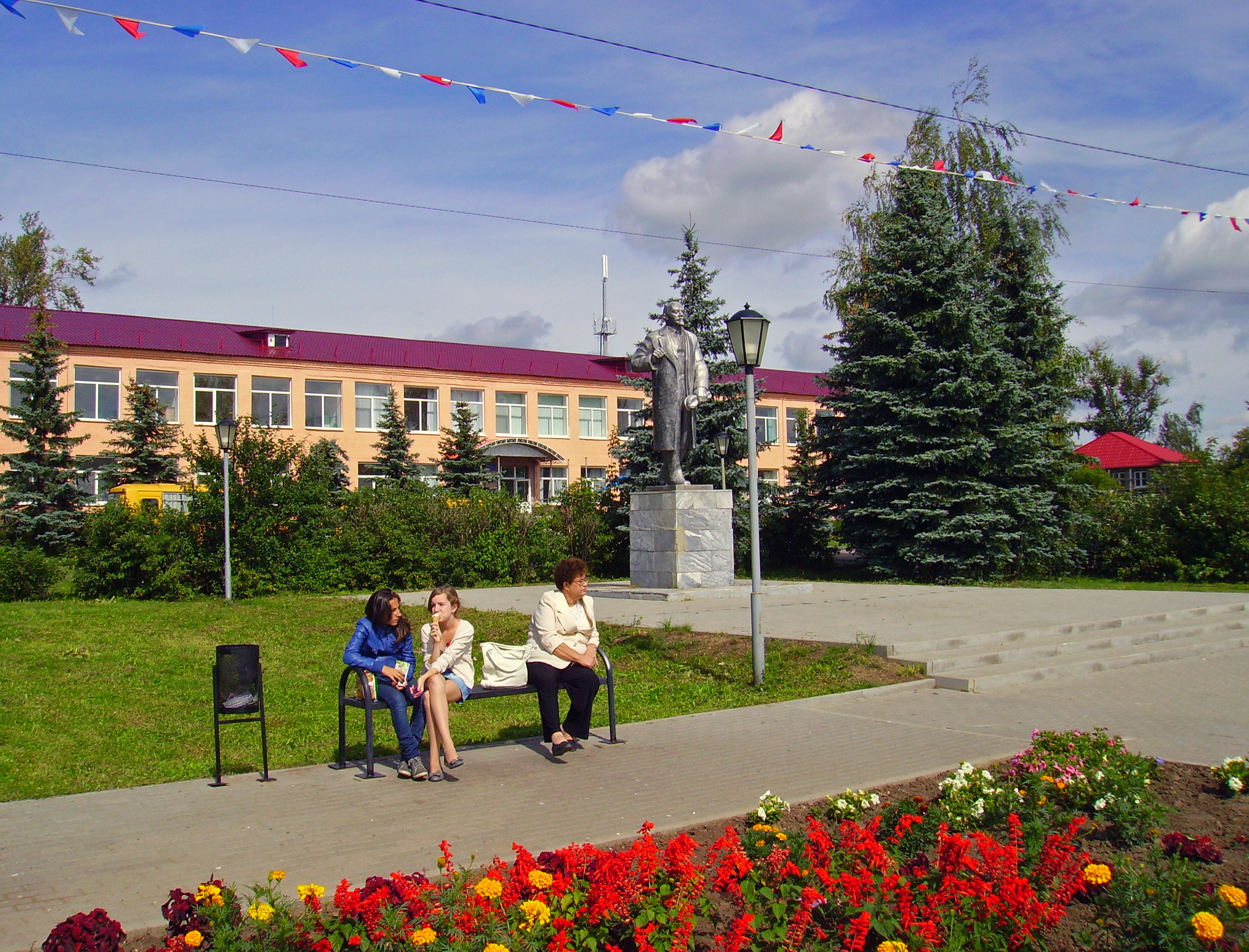
- Monument to Lenin in front of Town Primary School, Lukoyanov, Lukoyanovsky District

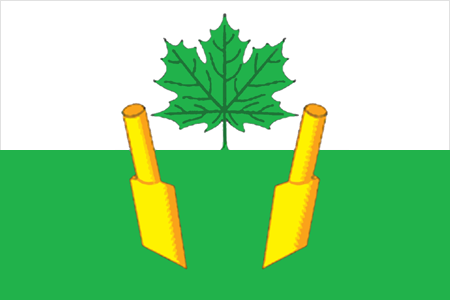
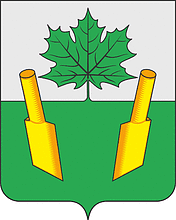
- Flag Coat of arms
- Location of Lukoyanovsky District in Nizhny Novgorod Oblast
- Coordinates: 55°02′18″N 44°29′52″E
- Country: Russia
- Federal subject: Nizhny Novgorod Oblast
- Established: 1929
- Administrative center: Lukoyanov

Area
  - Total: 1,890.7 km^{2} (730.0 sq mi)

Population (2010 Census)
  - Total: 32,384
  - Density: 17.128/km^{2} (44.361/sq mi)
  - Urban: 54.7%
  - Rural: 45.3%

Administrative structure
  - Administrative divisions: 1 Towns of district significance, 1 Work settlements, 6 Selsoviets
  - Inhabited localities: 1 cities/towns, 1 urban-type settlements, 71 rural localities

Municipal structure
  - Municipally incorporated as: Lukoyanovsky Municipal District
  - Municipal divisions: 2 urban settlements, 6 rural settlements
- Time zone: UTC+3 (MSK)
- OKTMO ID: 22639000
- Website: http://lukojanov.omsu-nnov.ru

Lukoyanovsky District (Russian: Лукоя́новский райо́н) is an administrative district (raion), one of the forty in Nizhny Novgorod Oblast, Russia. Municipally, it is incorporated as Lukoyanovsky Municipal District. It is located in the south of the oblast. The area of the district is 1,890.7 square kilometers (730.0 sq mi). Its administrative center is the town of Lukoyanov. Population: 32,384 (2010 Census); 35,828 (2002 census); 38,359 (1989 Soviet census). The population of Lukoyanov accounts for 46.2% of the district's total population.

== History ==
The district was established in 1929.

== Notable residents ==
- Nikolay Urvantsev (1893–1985), Soviet geologist and explorer, born in Lukoyanov
- Valery Taliev (1872–1932), botanist and evolutionary biologist, born in Lukoyanov
