= Pavel Kabanov =

Pavel Antonovich Kabanov
- Павел Антонович Кабанов
- Born: 24 May 1920; Nagornoye, Sudogodsky Uyezd, Vladimir Governorate, Russian Empire
- Died: 6 June 1985 (aged 65); Zhukovsky, Moscow Oblast, Russian SFSR, Soviet Union
- Military career
- Allegiance: Soviet Union
- Branch: Red Army
- Service years: 1941–1945
- Rank: Senior Sergeant
- Unit: 71st Guards Rifle Division
- Conflicts: World War II; Vitebsk-Orsha Offensive
- Awards: Hero of the Soviet Union; Order of Lenin; Order of the Patriotic War, 1st class Order of Glory, 3rd class

Pavel Antonovich Kabanov (Russian: Па́вел Анто́нович Каба́нов; 24 May 1920 – 6 June 1985) was a Red Army senior sergeant and Hero of the Soviet Union. Kabanov was awarded the title for suppressing German firing positions during the crossing of the Western Dvina in the Vitebsk–Orsha Offensive. Postwar, he worked at the Central Aerohydrodynamic Institute.

== Early life ==
Kabanov was born on 24 May 1920 in the village of Nagornoye in Vladimir Governorate to a peasant family. He worked in the Kovrov timber industry and then was a plumber at the Tizpribor factory in Moscow.

== World War II ==
Kabanov was drafted into the Red Army in June 1941. He fought in combat from October 1941. In late 1943, he was a sergeant and squad leader with the 148th Rifle Regiment of the 47th Rifle Division. On 23 March 1944, he was awarded the Order of Glory 3rd class. By June 1944, he was a machine-gun squad leader in the 210th Guards Rifle Regiment of the 71st Guards Rifle Division. He fought in the Vitebsk-Orsha Offensive. On 24 June, near the village of Mamoyki in the Beshankovichy Raion, Kabanov and his squad crossed the Western Dvina and suppressed German firing positions with machine-guns. This reportedly enabled the regiment to cross the Western Dvina. On 22 July 1944, Kabanov was awarded the title Hero of the Soviet Union and the Order of Lenin for his actions.

== Postwar ==
After the war, Kabanov was discharged. He joined the Communist Party of the Soviet Union in 1950. He lived in Zhukovsky, Moscow Oblast and worked at the Central Aerohydrodynamic Institute. On 6 April 1985, Kabanov was awarded the Order of the Patriotic War 1st class on the 40th anniversary of the end of World War II. He died on 6 June 1985 and was buried in the Bykovsky cemetery in the city.
