= Sukhovka =

Sukhovka Суховка
- Village
- Location within Vladimir Oblast Location within Russia
- Coordinates: 56°02′N 40°46′E
- Country: Russia
- Region: Vladimir Oblast
- District: Sudogodsky District
- Time zone: UTC+3:00

Sukhovka (Russian: Суховка) is a rural locality (a village) in Lavrovskoye Rural Settlement, Sudogodsky District, Vladimir Oblast, Russia. The population was 16 as of 2010.

== Geography ==
Sukhovka is located 20 km (12 mi) northwest of Sudogda (the district's administrative centre) by road. Koshchukhino is the nearest rural locality.

== History ==
According to the scribe books of the Vladimir district of 1637–1647, the village of Sukhovka was recorded for M.E. Khonenev. In the census books of 1678 there were three peasant and four bobyl yards with a population of 29 males.

Between the 19th and early 20th centuries, the village was part of the Danilovskaya volost of the Sudogodsky Uyezd, and since 1926 part of the Sudogodskaya volost of the Vladimirsky Uyezd. In 1859, there were 24 households in the village, in 1905 there were 67 households, and in 1926 there were 89 households.

Since 1929, the village has been the center of the Sukhovsky village council of the Sudogodsky District, since 1940 part of the Torzhkovsky selsovet council, since 1954 part of the Chamerevsky selsovet, and since 2005 part of the Lavrovsky rural settlement.

== Demographics ==
1859	1905	1926
184	338	431
