= Konstantin Bestuzhev-Ryumin =

Russian historian (1829–1897)

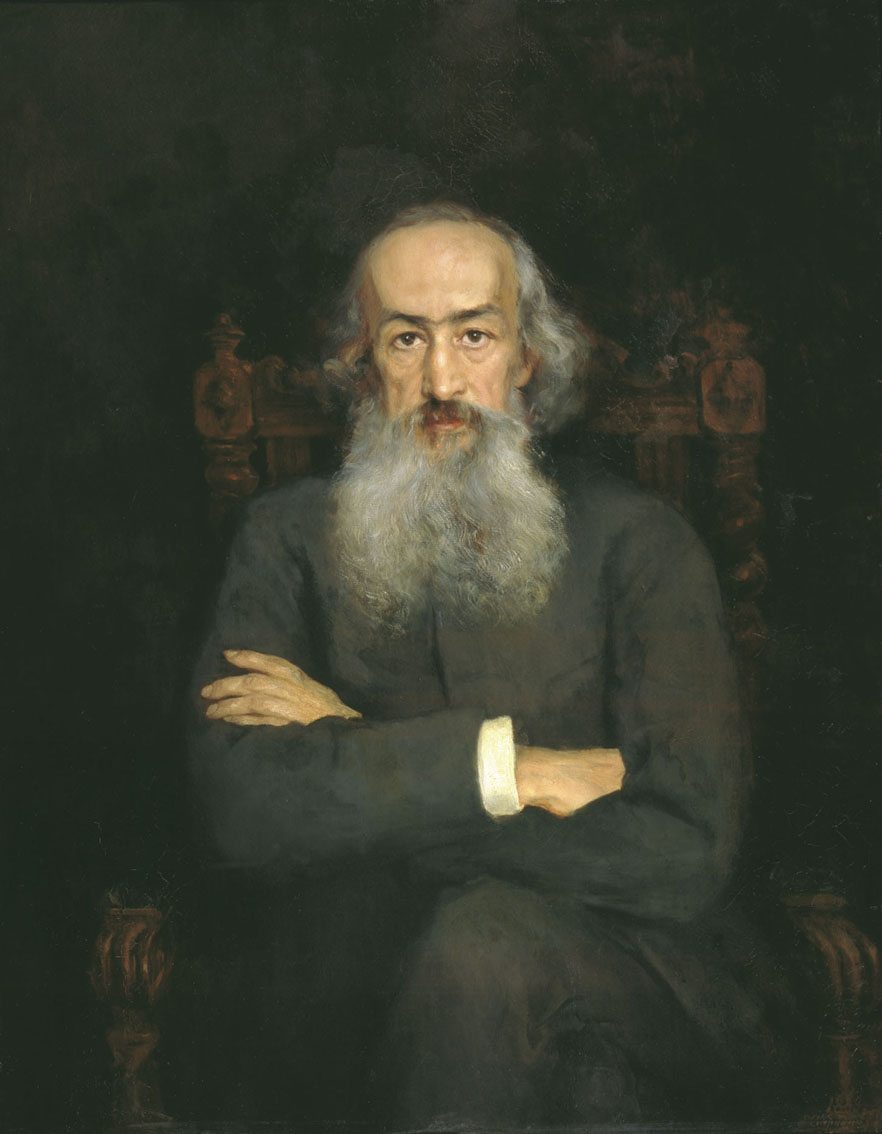
- Portrait by Yekaterina Zarudnaya-Cavos, 1889
- Born: May 26, 1829; Kudryoshki, Nizhny Novgorod Governorate, Russia
- Died: January 14, 1897 (aged 67); Saint Petersburg, Russia
- Education: Imperial Moscow University (1851)
- Occupation: Academician
- Scientific career
- Fields: History
- Workplaces: Saint Petersburg Imperial University

Konstantin Nikolayevich Bestuzhev-Ryumin (Russian: Константин Николаевич Бестужев-Рюмин; 26 May [O.S. 14 May ] 1829 – 14 January [O.S. 2 January] 1897) was a Russian historian.

He was the head of the School of Historiography at the University of St. Petersburg (1864–85) and was elected into the St. Petersburg Academy of Sciences in 1890. In 1878, he founded and gave his name to the Bestuzhev Courses, "the largest and most prominent women's higher education institution in Russia".

== Career ==
Bestuzhev was born into one of Russia's oldest families; Mikhail Bestuzhev-Ryumin was his uncle. He started out as a journalist, helping Andrey Krayevsky to edit the literary journal Otechestvennye Zapiski where he published numerous reviews of historical and ethnographic works. He was drawn to a moderate wing of the Slavophile movement and welcomed Nikolai Danilevsky's theories. His pupils include Alexander III of Russia, several Grand Dukes from the Romanov family, and historian Sergey Platonov.

Among Bestuzhev's works are a set of popular books on Russia's history, several monographs on medieval paleography, and the two volumes of Russian History. The latter work is considered his magnum opus. Bestuzhev was known for carefully detailing the views of other historians whilst withholding his own opinions.

== Sources ==
- "Бестужев-Рюмин, Константин Николаевич" . Brockhaus and Efron Encyclopedic Dictionary (in Russian). 1906.
- Киреева Р. А. Бестужев-Рюмин и историческая наука второй половины XIX века. М., 1990.
- Киреева Р. А. Бестужев-Рюмин К. Н. // Историки России: Биографии / Под ред. А.А. Чернобаева. М., 2001.
- Малинов А. В. К. Н. Бестужев-Рюмин: Очерк теоретико-исторических и философских взглядов. СПб., 2005.
- Imperial Moscow University: 1755-1917: encyclopedic dictionary. Moscow: Russian political encyclopedia (ROSSPEN). 2010. pp. 66–67. ISBN 978-5-8243-1429-8 – via A. Andreev, D. Tsygankov.
