= Uboynaya =

Location
- Country: Russia

Physical characteristics
- Source: Byrranga Mountains
- Mouth: Kara Sea
  - coordinates: 73.6481°N 82.3728°E
- Length: 98 km (61 mi)
- Basin size: 2,280 km^{2} (880 sq mi)

The Uboynaya (Russian: Убойная) is a river in the Taymyr Peninsula, Krasnoyarsk Krai, Russian Federation. Its source is in the Byrranga Mountains. It flows across desolate tundra regions into the Kara Sea. It is 98 kilometres (61 mi) long, and has a drainage basin of 2,280 square kilometres (880 sq mi). The lichen Dactylina arctica is common and abundant in the area.

The Uboynaya freezes up in late September or early October and stays under the ice until June. In the short summer the area is a breeding ground for certain birds, like the dunlin.

== History ==
In 1922, while leading a geological expedition, Nikolay Urvantsev found abandoned skis at the mouth of the Uboynaya River. They belonged to Roald Amundsen's 1919 Arctic expedition's ill-fated crew members Peter Tessem and Paul Knutsen.

This river is now within the Great Arctic State Nature Reserve, the largest nature reserve of Russia and one of the biggest in the world.
