= Lemeshki =

Rural settlement in Vladimir Oblast, Russia

Lemeshki Лемешки
- Selo
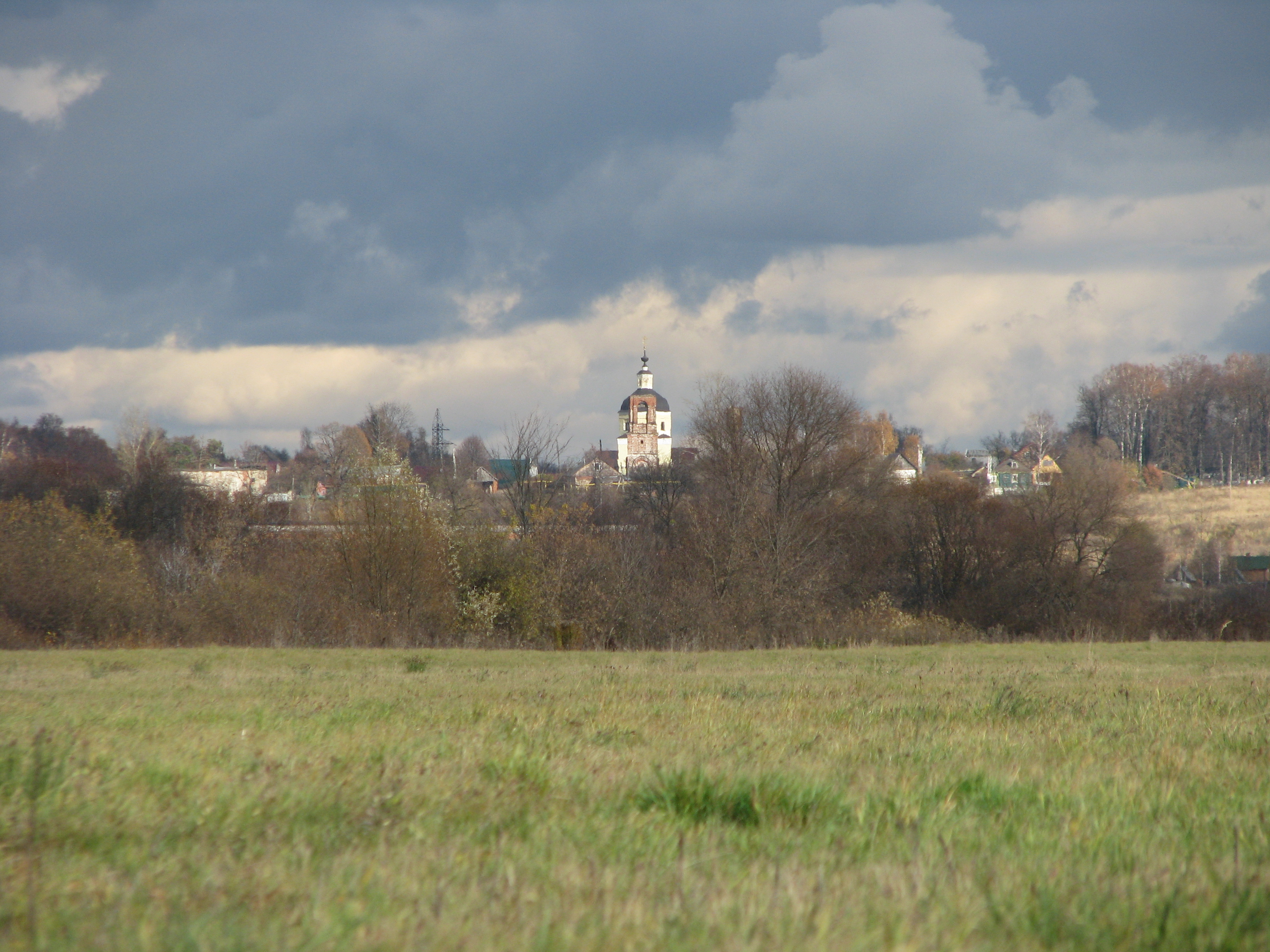

- Location within Vladimir Oblast Location within Russia
- Coordinates: 56°12′N 40°35′E
- Country: Russia
- Region: Vladimir Oblast
- District: Suzdalsky District
- Time zone: UTC+3:00

Lemeshki (Russian: Лемешки) is a rural locality (a selo) in Bogolyubovskoye Rural Settlement, Suzdalsky District, Vladimir Oblast, Russia. The population was 441 as of 2010. There are 7 streets.

== Geography ==
Lemeshki is located 30 km southeast of Suzdal (the district's administrative centre) by road. Bogolyubovo is the nearest rural locality.

== History ==
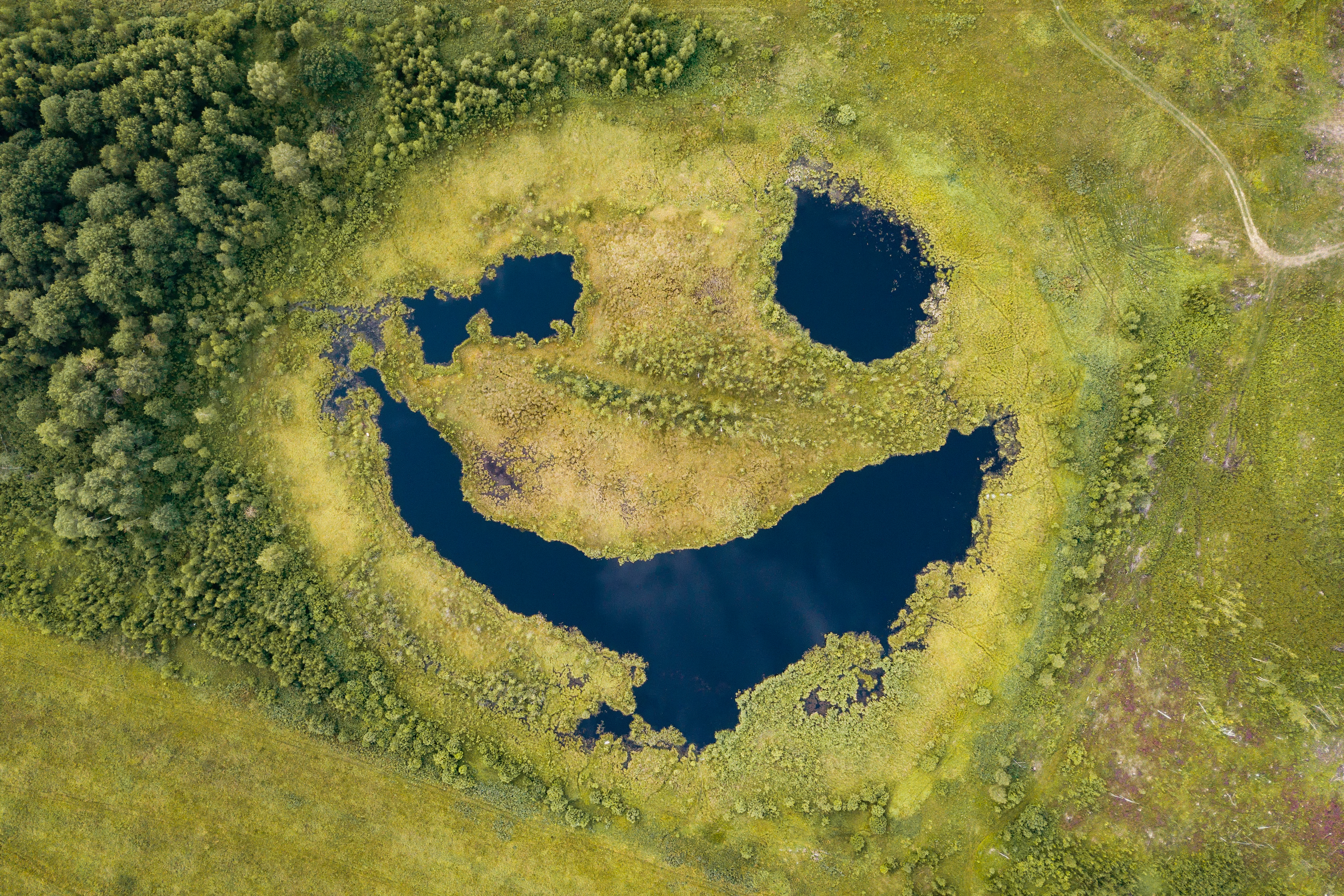
"Laughing" lakes near the village

According to legend, this village was made up of peasants of different places, resettled here by landlords, of which there were five in the village. The church was first built here by the landowner Stepan Andreevich Feofilatiev in 1692 and consecrated in the name of the Ascension of the Lord. A priest, a sexton, a sexton, a sexton and a maid were assigned to it. The landlord for the parish allocated 10 quarters of arable land and 10 hayfields. In 1726 at the request of Alexander Theophylatyev the old wooden church was transferred from the village Oslavskoe and from it in Lemeshka another warm church was built, which was named after Nicholas the Wonderworker. At the beginning of the 19th century instead of these two churches there was built a stone church; warm side chapel was consecrated in 1808 and the high altar in 1824. In 1857 a stone bell tower was added to the church. There were three altars in the church: the cold one is in the name of the Ascension of the Lord, the vestibules are in the name of Nicholas the Wonderworker and the Mother of God "Joy of All Who Sorrow". In 1893 the parish included the village of Lemeshki and the villages of Kvashnin, Grezin, Sobolikha and Nov. Bykova, which according to the church records had 519 male and 549 female inhabitants. In the village of Lemeshka was a public school, maintained at the expense of zemstvo.

At the end of the 19th and early 20th century the village was part of Bogolyubovskaya volost Vladimirsky Uezd, Vladimir Governorate.

Since 1929 the village was part of Bogolyubovsky village council of Vladimir District, since 1965 - the center of Lemeshinsky village council of Suzdalsky District.
