= Knyagininsky Uyezd =

Knyagininsky Uyezd (Княгининский уезд) was one of the subdivisions of the Nizhny Novgorod Governorate of the Russian Empire. It was situated in the central part of the governorate. Its administrative centre was Knyaginino.

== Demographics ==
At the time of the Russian Empire Census of 1897, Knyagininsky Uyezd had a population of 106,191. Of these, 98.0% spoke Russian and 1.9% Tatar as their native language.
