= Melenkovsky Uyezd =

Melenkovsky Uyezd (Меленковский уезд) was one of the subdivisions of the Vladimir Governorate of the Russian Empire. It was situated in the southeastern part of the governorate. Its administrative centre was Melenki.

== Demographics ==
At the time of the Russian Empire Census of 1897, Melenkovsky Uyezd had a population of 142,304. Of these, 99.9% spoke Russian as their native language.
