= Nikolay Urvantsev =

Soviet geologist and explorer

Nikolay Nikolayevich Urvantsev (Russian: Никола́й Николáевич Урвáнцев; 29 January [O.S. 17 January] 1893 – 20 February 1985) was a Soviet geologist and explorer. He was born in the town of Lukoyanov in the Lukoyanovsky Uyezd of the Nizhny Novgorod Governorate of the Russian Empire to the family of a merchant. He graduated from the Tomsk Engineering Institute in 1918.

Urvantsev was among the discoverers of the Norilsk coal basin and Norilsk copper-nickel ore region in 1919-1922 and was among the founders of Norilsk town.

== Overview ==
=== Career ===
In 1922, while leading a geological expedition, Urvantsev found evidence of the mysteriously disappeared Amundsen's 1918 Arctic expedition crew members Peter Tessem and Paul Knutsen. Urvantsev recovered the mail and scientific data that the two ill-fated Norwegians had been carrying. The valuable documents were lying abandoned on the Kara Sea shore near the mouth of the Zeledeyeva River.

In 1930-1932 Urvantsev, together with Georgy Ushakov, explored the Severnaya Zemlya archipelago where they discovered a number of islands. He published a book about the expedition, At the Severnaya Zemlya. He also explored other remote areas of Russia, Taimyr and Central Siberian Plateau.

In 1933-34 the newly formed Glavsevmorput’ (Chief Administration of the Northern Sea Route) sent the steamer Pravda to Nordvik on the historical first oil exploration expedition to Northern Siberia. This venture was led by Nikolay Urvantsev who travelled on the Pravda along with his wife, Dr. Yelizaveta Ivanovna. She was the officer in charge of the medical care of the expedition.

During the Stalinism era Urvantsev was several times wrongfully accused of wrecking. He was convicted and had to serve in Karlag (Karaganda labor camp system) and Norillag (Norilsk labor camp system).

Urvantsev was fully exonerated in 1954. Until his death he worked as Chair of the Arctic Geology Department in the Scientific Research Institute of Arctic Geology (НИИГА, now All-Russian Scientific Research Institute of World Ocean Geology and Mineral Resources, VNII Okeanologiya, ВНИИ Океанология).

== Awards and honors ==
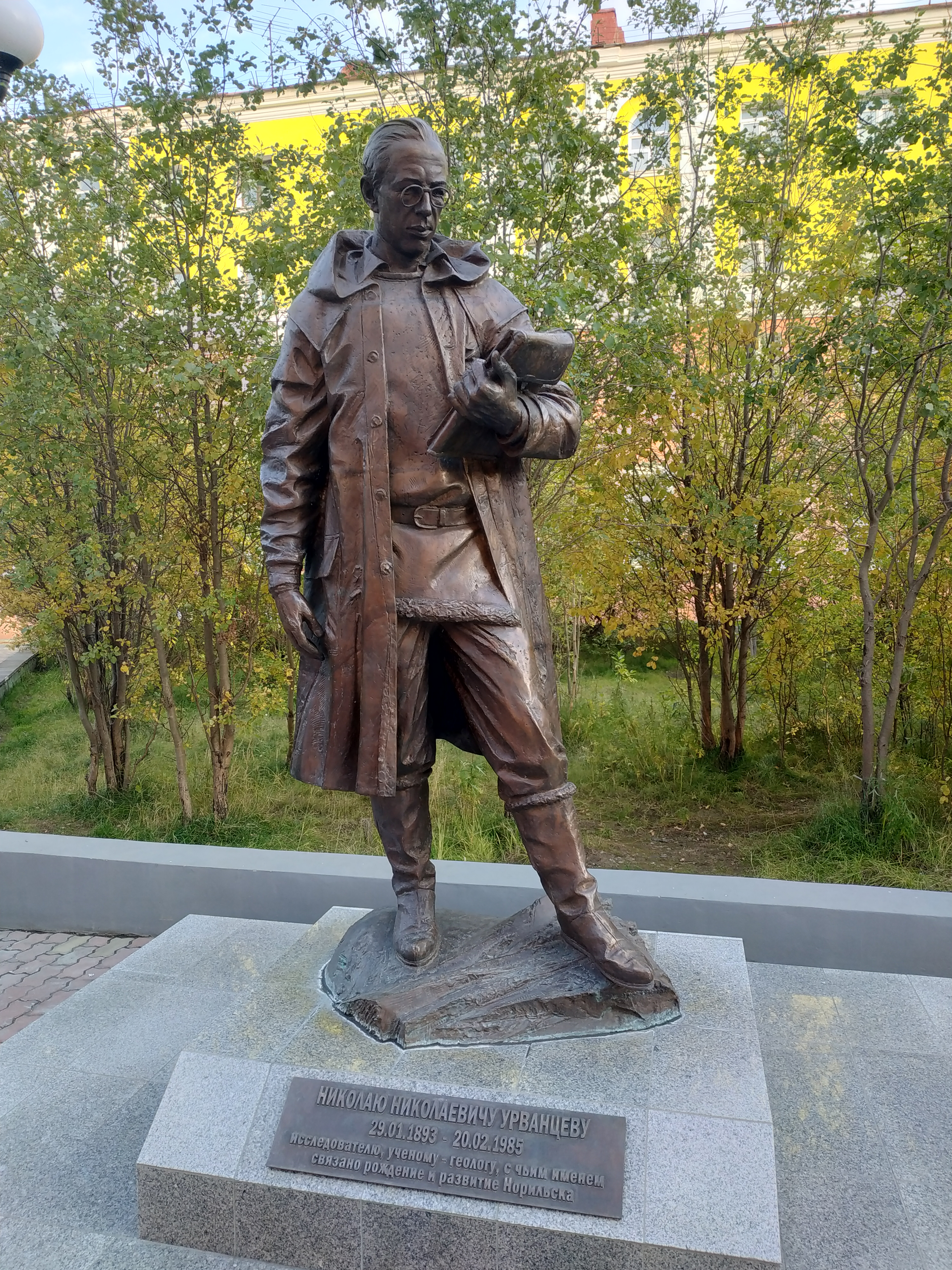
Monument to N. N. Urvantsev in Norilsk

He was the recipient of two Orders of Lenin and several medals and the honorary title of Honored Worker of Science. The USSR Geographical Society elected him an Honorary Member and awarded him the Great Gold Medal.

The mineral Urvantsevite honors his name.

== See also ==
- Komsomolskaya Pravda Islands
- Pronchishcheva Bay
- Nordvik (Laptev Sea)
- William Barr
