= Ardatovsky Uyezd (Nizhny Novgorod Governorate) =

Ardatovsky Uyezd (Ардатовский уезд) was one of the subdivisions of the Nizhny Novgorod Governorate of the Russian Empire. It was situated in the southwestern part of the governorate. Its administrative centre was Ardatov.

== Demographics ==
At the time of the Russian Empire Census of 1897, Ardatovsky Uyezd had a population of 141,625. Of these, 98.8% spoke Russian, 0.9% Mordvin, 0.1% German and 0.1% Polish as their native language.
