= Knyagininsky District =

Knyagininsky District Княгининский район (Russian)
- District
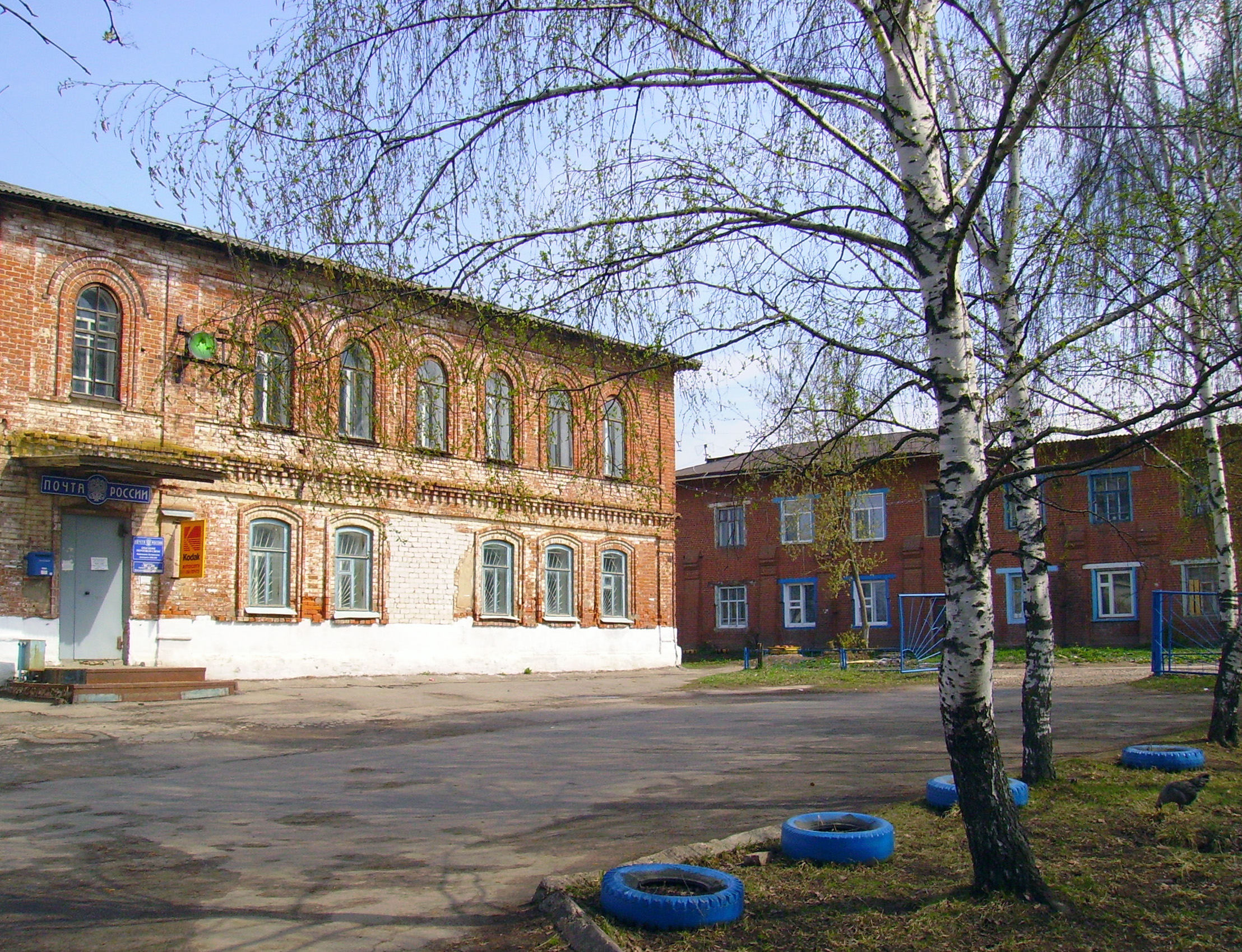
- Post office building in Knyaginino, the administrative center of the district

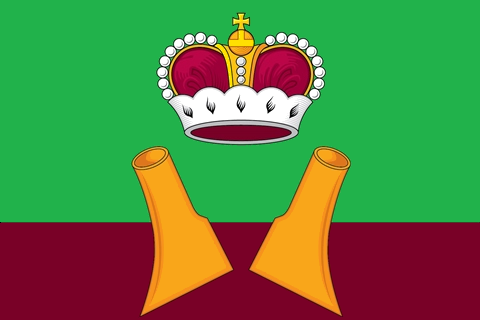
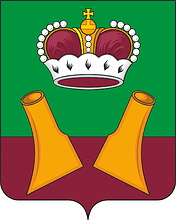
- Flag Coat of arms
- Location of Knyagininsky District in Nizhny Novgorod Oblast
- Coordinates: 55°49′N 45°02′E
- Country: Russia
- Federal subject: Nizhny Novgorod Oblast
- Established: 1944
- Administrative center: Knyaginino

Area
  - Total: 769.9 km^{2} (297.3 sq mi)

Population (2010 Census)
  - Total: 11,922
  - Density: 15.49/km^{2} (40.11/sq mi)
  - Urban: 56.3%
  - Rural: 43.7%

Administrative structure
  - Administrative divisions: 1 Towns of district significance, 4 Selsoviets
  - Inhabited localities: 1 cities/towns, 61 rural localities

Municipal structure
  - Municipally incorporated as: Knyagininsky Municipal District
  - Municipal divisions: 1 urban settlements, 4 rural settlements
- Time zone: UTC+3 (MSK)
- OKTMO ID: 22633000
- Website: http://www.admknyaginino.ru

Knyagininsky District (Russian: Княги́нинский райо́н) is an administrative district (raion), one of the forty in Nizhny Novgorod Oblast, Russia. Municipally, it is incorporated as Knyagininsky Municipal District. It is located in the east of the oblast. The area of the district is 769.9 square kilometers (297.3 sq mi). Its administrative center is the town of Knyaginino. Population: 11,922 (2010 Census); 12,758 (2002 census); 12,827 (1989 Soviet census). The population of Knyaginino accounts for 56.3% of the district's total population.

== History ==
The district was established in 1944.
