= Peter Tessem and Paul Knutsen =

Norwegian explorers who disappeared during an Arctic expedition

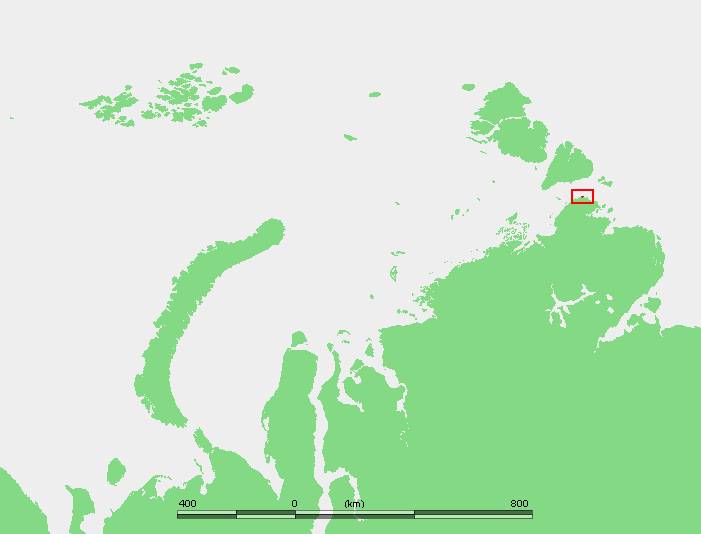
Location of Cape Chelyuskin where Tessem and Knutsen began their ill-fated journey.

Peter Tessem and Paul Knutsen were two young men from Norway who went with fellow Norwegian explorer Roald Amundsen on his 1918 Arctic expedition aboard ship Maud. Peter Tessem was a carpenter and Paul Knutsen was an able-bodied seaman. One year into the expedition, in 1919, Amundsen left Peter Tessem and Paul Knutsen behind at Cape Chelyuskin after having made winter quarters there. Amundsen chose Peter Tessem because he had been suffering from chronic headaches throughout the winter and was not fit to continue the long expedition. He selected Paul Knutsen because he had previously wintered in the Kara Sea in 1914–1915 with Otto Sverdrup on ship Eclipse, so he knew about the locations of the caches of provisions that had been left in the area by Sverdrup.

The men were instructed to wait for the freeze-up of the Kara Sea and then sledge southwestwards along the western coast of the Taymyr Peninsula towards Dikson, carrying the mail and the valuable scientific data accumulated by the expedition. Meanwhile, the Maud continued eastwards into the Laptev Sea.

These two men disappeared mysteriously during their 800-kilometre (500 mi) trip over the ice and were never seen again. The Norwegians' journey was identical in its last 600 kilometres (370 mi) to the sledge trip undertaken a few years earlier at the orders of Baron Eduard Toll by Zarya Captain Nikolai Kolomeitsev and Cossack Stepan Rastorguyev. In 1901, Kolomeitsev and Rastorguev had covered the distance from Bukhta Kolin Archera, SW of Taymyr Island, to Dikson in one month, so Tessem and Knutsen's trip should not have taken much longer. However, almost a year passed and nothing was heard of the two Norwegians.

== Norwegian search expedition ==
The alarm was raised in March 1920 by Leon Amundsen when he got a telegram from his brother Roald, who was then wintering near Ayon Island, in the East Siberian Sea, inquiring whether his men had reached home safely.

Veteran Arctic explorer Otto Sverdrup, acting on behalf of the Royal Norwegian Department for Churches and Education, tried to conduct a search by sending schooner Heimen to the Kara Sea on 23 August 1920. However, the schooner encountered heavy ice already east of Dikson, and Captain Lars Jakobsen was forced to turn back when he was close to the Mikhailov Peninsula. Jakobsen tried then to hire dogs or reindeer for an overland expedition, but the practical difficulties he encountered became unsurmountable, for the area was practically uninhabited except for the little station at Dikson.

== Soviet search expedition ==
Finally, in 1921, Nikifor Begichev led a Soviet expedition in search for Peter Tessem and Paul Knutsen on request of the government of Norway. Captain Lars Jakobsen and Alfred Karlsen, another Norwegian who had been with him at Dikson and who acted as interpreter, accompanied Begichev. Begichev had a good impression of Jakobsen and Karlsen; he thought that they were tough, reliable and helpful.

At the start of their search, they had a letter dated November 18, 1919, found about a tenth of the way from Cape Chelyuskin to Dikson; it was placed in a tin can in a cairn on Mys Vil’da (Cape Vilda). It said that Tessem and Knutsen were heading towards Dikson in good health with provisions for twenty days.

On August 2, 1921, some distance southwest of Cape Vilda, the Norwegian sledge was found by Jakobsen indicating that something had gone wrong with the two men. Further, he found other materials near Cape Sterligov. On August 16, 1921, Begichev found a fireplace with smoked men's bones near Cape Primetny, including a skull, empty cartridges, and a broken knife, suggesting a physical struggle.

After examination of the things, Begichev decided that the bones belonged to one of the missing Norwegian seamen. However, after Begichev's death, it was presumed that the bones belonged to somebody from Rusanov's expedition.

The expedition of 1922 found a theodolite, mail, and other things on the Zeledeev river, 80 kilometres (50 mi) from Dikson, belonging to Knudsen and Tessem. Closer to Dikson, on the Uboynaya River, two pairs of Norwegian skis and part of a sleeping-bag were found. Finally, in July 1922, 3 kilometres (1.9 mi) from Dikson, Begichev found a skeleton of a man wearing a golden watch engraved with Peter Tessem's name.

The search was abandoned, but before Captain Jakobsen and Alfred Karlsen returned to Norway via Krasnoyarsk, they had established good friendships with many Russians. Owing to their good character, the Soviet authorities and many persons in different places of Russia went out of their way to assist them. This was not always easy considering the penury of the times in the early Soviet Union.

== Remains found by chance ==
In August 1922, a geological expedition led by N. N. Urvantsev found, by chance, the mail and scientific data that Tessem and Knutsen had been carrying. The valuable documents lay strewn about, abandoned near the mouth of the Zeledeyeva River. Later, the skis belonging to the missing Norwegians were found at the mouth of the Uboynaya River. In July 1922, a mummified corpse, practically a skeleton, was found on the mainland shore across from Dikson Island within sight of the weather station that was the two men's destination.

Forensic analysis revealed that it was one of the two Norwegian explorers and that the most likely cause of death was starvation. Another possible cause of death is that the Norwegian hurried when he saw the lights of the polar station, so that he slipped and fell down. He might have knocked himself unconscious hitting a boulder, could not stand up, and froze to death.

It is not clear, however, whether the corpse by the shore was Peter Tessem's or Paul Knutsen's; the golden watch with Tessem's name engraved on it led to the presumption that it was Tessem. The photo of the skeleton was taken by Georgy Rybin. The other body was never found.

The dead man was buried farther up the slope in the same spot and his grave was marked with a driftwood cross. Two years later, the crew of Norwegian ship Veslekari erected a more imposing larch cross on the spot. In 1958, the remains were moved to the top of the cape where there is now a granite monument with a plaque inscribed in Russian, and in the Roman alphabet, to honor the memory of the dead Norwegian. The inscription reads: "TESSEM, Norwegian seaman, member of the expedition, MS Maud, died 1920."

== See also ==
- List of people who disappeared mysteriously at sea
- List of unsolved deaths
