= Coat of arms of Nizhny Novgorod =

Versions
- Small version
- Adopted: 1583; 20 December 2006 (current)
- Crest: Five prong crown
- Shield: Modern French shield
- Order(s): Order of Lenin
- Earlier version(s)
- Use: City Duma of Nizhny Novgorod
- Adopted December 20, 2006

The coat of arms of Nizhny Novgorod is the official symbol of the city from December 20, 2006.

== Description ==
For the basis of the coat of arms of Nizhny Novgorod, the historical coat of arms of August 16, 1781 was taken.

The coat of arms of Nizhny Novgorod is an image of a deer on the French heraldic shield framed with the ribbon of the Order of Lenin.

Heraldic description: "On the silver (white) shield a walking red deer is depicted. Horns, eyes and hoofs are black. The shield is crowned with a golden crown tower with five prongs with a golden laurel wreath. Framed on the sides with ribbon of the Order of Lenin".

- The deer is a symbol of nobility, purity and greatness, life, wisdom and justice;
- The crown is a symbol of achieving a high stage of development. The crown indicates that Nizhny Novgorod is the administrative center of the Nizhny Novgorod Region and the Volga Federal District;
- The ribbon around the shield indicates that Nizhny Novgorod was awarded the Order of Lenin.

Symbolic color values:

- silver (white) color is a symbol of perfection, nobility, purity of thoughts and peace;
- red color is a symbol of courage, intrepidity, maturity, energy and vitality;
- black color is a symbol of prudence, wisdom, honesty, modesty, humility and eternity of being.

== History ==
Coat of arms of the Nizhny Novgorod principality from the Roll of arms of Vasily Durasov

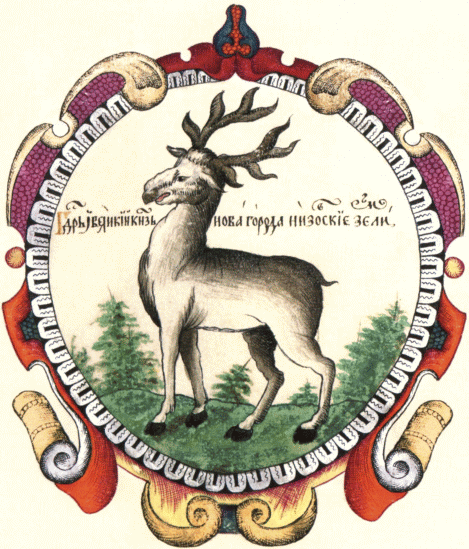
"Seal of Nizhny Novgorod: deer, under the deer is a land" 1626

The history of the emblem of the coat of arms of Nizhny Novgorod is controversial. Some historians believe that in the 16th and 17th centuries the elk was depicted on the coat of arms of Nizhny Novgorod, and in the 18th century, the King-of-Arms turned it into a deer. In the decree of Tsar Alexei Mikhailovich on the production of the stamp of arms from 1666 it was written: "The seal of the Nizhny Novgorod, on it the elk is coming". Other scientists believe that already in the 17th century, a deer was depicted on the coat of arms. They refer to the "Tsarskiy titulyarnik", compiled in the Posolsky Prikaz, after the great Moscow fire of 1626. It read: "Seal of Nizhny Novgorod: deer, under the deer is a land."

The first version of the city's coat of arms was approved on August 16, 1781 by Catherine the Great:

The decree of Her Imperial Majesty and the Autocrat of the All-Russian from the Government Senate to the Nizhny Novgorod Provincial Government. ... the cities of Nizhny Novgorod viceroyalty, namely the Nizhny City ... ... ORDERED with the coats of arms to make copies, and sent to this viceroyalty. September 16, 1781

It is noted that "the city of Nizhny has an old coat of arms."

Vladimir Gilyarovsky wrote that barge haulers, for whom the Nizhny Novgorod coat of arms was a symbol of rest and fun, called him "a cheerful goat".

During the Soviet era, the city's coat of arms was not used. However, the GAZ logo was often used, on which a deer was depicted. Most often, a white or gold running deer was depicted on a red background - a symbol of the Soviet Union.

In 1992, the coat of arms was restored. The new city coat of arms was different from the historical one. The shield was surrounded by golden oak leaves, girded with a ribbon of flowers of the national flag of Russia. This version of the coat of arms caused criticism from specialists in heraldry and design. It was pointed out that this variant did not meet the heraldic norms.

The need to change the coat of arms and the flag of Nizhny Novgorod arose after in 2005 the Heraldic Council of the President of Russia decided that the coats of arms of all the administrative centers of the country should have an image of the crown. Under the new rules, the colors of the state flag of the country should not have been present in municipal emblems. The new coat of arms was approved on December 20, 2006.

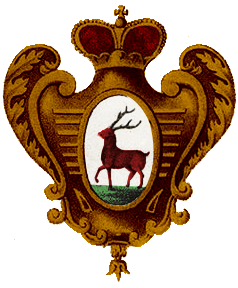
Coat of arms of Nizhny Novgorod regiment (1730)

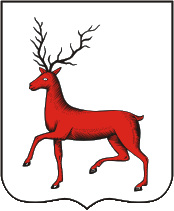
The coat of arms of Nizhny Novgorod (1781)

Coat of arms of Nizhny Novgorod Governorate

The coat of arms of Nizhny Novgorod under the heraldic reform of Bernhard Karl von Koehne (1857)

Coat of Arms of Nizhegorodsky Uyezd

One of the variants of Gorky's symbol in Soviet era

The coat of arms of the city after the dissolution of Soviet Union (1992)

Coat of arms of the city after making changes from the Heraldic Council (2006)

Digital emblem of the Government of the Nizhny Novgorod Oblast
