= Vasilsursky Uyezd =

Vasilsursky Uyezd (Васильсурский уезд) was one of the subdivisions of the Nizhny Novgorod Governorate of the Russian Empire. It was situated in the northeastern part of the governorate. Its administrative centre was Vasilsursk.

== Demographics ==
At the time of the Russian Empire Census of 1897, Vasilsursky Uyezd had a population of 127,333. Of these, 87.0% spoke Russian, 8.6% Tatar, 4.2% Mari, 0.1% Chuvash and 0.1% Mordvin as their native language.
