= Olga Berggolts =

Russian and Soviet poet

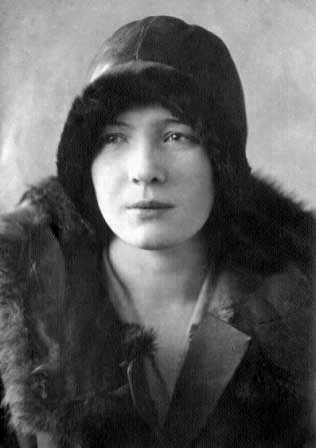
Olga Berggolts in 1930

Olga Fyodorovna Berggolts (Russian: Ольга Фёдоровна Берггольц, IPA: [ˈolʲɡə ˈfʲɵdərəvnə bʲɪrˈɡolʲts]; 16 May [O.S. 3 May] 1910 – November 13, 1975) was a Soviet and Russian poet, writer, playwright and journalist. She is most famous for her work on the Leningrad radio during the city's siege, when she became the symbol of the city's resilience.

== Early life ==
Olga Berggolts was born in a working suburb of Saint Petersburg. Her father Fyodor Khristophorovich Berggolts (1885–1948) was a surgeon of half-Russian and half-Latvian descent, although in 1942 he was deported to the Krasnoyarsk Krai as "an ethnic German and a son of a principal shareholder" (his father was in fact a factory worker). He studied in the Imperial Military Medical Academy under Nikolay Burdenko and served as a military doctor during the World War I; after the October Revolution he was mobilized by the Red Army and continued working at the hospital train.

Olga's mother, Maria Timofeyevna Berggolts (née Grustilina) (1884–1957), was a native Russian. She also had a younger sister Maria (1912–2003) who would later become an actress of the Leningrad State Theatre of Musical Comedy. With the start of the Russian Civil War in 1918 Fyodor Berggolts sent his family to Uglich where they lived in the former Bogoyavlensky Monastery up until 1921. Upon return Olga entered a Petrograd labor school which she finished in 1926.

== Career ==
Her verses dedicated to Vladimir Lenin were first published in 1924. In 1925, she joined a youth literature group 'The Shift' where she became acquainted with Boris Kornilov. In 1927, Boris and Olga entered the State Institute of Art History, and in 1928, they got married. Same year their daughter Irina was born. Soon the institute was shut down. Some of the students —including Olga, but not Boris— were moved to the Leningrad University.

In 1930, she graduated from the philological faculty and was sent to Kazakhstan to work as a journalist for the Soviet Steppe newspaper. During this period Olga divorced Kornilov and married her fellow student Nikolay Molchanov. She also published her first book for children Winter-Summer-Parrot (1930).

After returning to Leningrad in 1931, she started working as a journalist for the newspaper of the electric power plant (Electric Power). In 1932 she gave birth to her second daughter Maya who died in just a year. Her feelings and thoughts on this period were expressed in such books as The Out-of-the-way Place (1932), Night (1935), Journalists (1934), and Grains (1935). Such works by Berggolts as Poems (1934) and Uglich (1932) were approved of by Maxim Gorky. In 1934 she joined the Union of Soviet Writers.

During the late 1930s, Berggolts survived several personal tragedies. Her first daughter Irina died in 1936, aged seven, and in 1937, she lost her third child during the full-term pregnancy following the interrogation on the so-called "Averbakh Case" (she contacted Leopold Averbakh of the Russian Association of Proletarian Writers at the start of 1930). Soon, her former husband, Boris Kornilov, was arrested "for taking part in the anti-Soviet Trotskyist organization" and executed in February 1938. In December, Olga herself was arrested on the same account and imprisoned. She spent seven months in prison, but denied all accusations. All this caused a birth of her fourth stillborn child. During that time period, she wrote poems published as a Trial anthology during the 1960s. She was subsequently released and completely exonerated in 1939.

In 1940, she joined the Communist Party. After a long period of silence, her novel Dream and a book of stories Vitya Mamanin were published to a great acclaim, although she had to hide her prison poetry.

== War years ==
With the start of the Great Patriotic War in June 1941, Berggolts was sent to work at the Leningrad Radio House. She spent almost every day of the blockade in Leningrad working at the radio, encouraging hungry and depressed citizens of the city by her speeches and poems. Her thoughts and impressions on this period, on problems of heroism, love, faithfulness can be found in February Diary (1942), Leningrad Poem (1942), Your Way (1945), and some others.

In January 1942, she survived another personal tragedy: her second husband Nikolay Molchanov died of hunger. Olga later dedicated a poem 29 January 1942 and her book The Knot (1965) to Nikolay. In March 1942, Olga, who suffered from a critical form of dystrophy, was forcefully sent by her friends to Moscow using the Road of Life, despite her protests. On 20 April, she returned to Leningrad and continued her work at the Radio House. On her return, she married Georgy Makogonenko, a literary critic, also a radio host during the siege. In 1943, she was awarded the Medal "For the Defence of Leningrad".

Together with her husband, she wrote a screenplay turned a play Born in Leningrad and a requiem In Memory of Defenders (1944) on the request of a woman whose brother was killed during the last days of the siege. On January 27, 1945, Berggolts, Makogonenko and their colleagues released a "radio film" entitled 900 days that included various fragments of reports, voices, sounds and music pieces recorded during the siege. She also published a book of memoirs Leningrad Is Talking and a play They Lived in Leningrad based on her war experience.

== Late years ==
Berggolts also wrote many times about heroic and glorious events in the history of Russia, such as Pervorossiysk (1950), a poem about the Altay commune organized by the workers of Petrograd; Faithfulness (1954), a tragedy about the defence of Sevastopol in 1941–1942; and The Day Stars (1959), an autobiographical novel that was turned into a movie of the same name by Igor Talankin in 1968. Olga's voice could be also heard in another Talankin's movie Introduction to Life (1963) as she reads her poetry.

On May 9, 1960, Piskaryovskoye Memorial Cemetery was opened, dedicated to the victims of the Siege of Leningrad, with the words by Olga Berggolts engraved on the wall behind the Motherland monument. The last line "No one is forgotten, nothing is forgotten" became a catchphrase since, often mentioned in Russia during memorial days.

Olga Berggolts died on 13 November 1975, and was buried at Literatorskie Mostki of the Volkovo Cemetery.

== Honours and legacy ==
- Stalin Prize, third class (1951) – for the poem "Pervorossiysk" (1950)
- Order of Lenin
- Order of the Red Banner of Labour
- Medal "For the Defence of Leningrad" (1943)
- Medal "For Valiant Labour in the Great Patriotic War 1941–1945"
- Honorary citizen of St. Petersburg (1994)

A minor planet 3093 Bergholz discovered by Soviet astronomer Tamara Smirnova in 1971 is named after her. A street in the Nevsky District bears her name, as well as a central street in Uglich. A monument in her memory was opened in Saint Petersburg in May 2015. Also on June the complete collection of diaries by Olga Berggolts was published for the first time by the Russian State Archive of Literature and Art. A crater on Venus is named after her.

American playwright Ivan Fuller wrote a play about Berggolts in 2009 called Awake in Me.
