= Zeledeyeva =

- Mouth of the Zeledeyeva

Location
- Country: Russia

Physical characteristics
- Mouth: Kara Sea
  - coordinates: 73.6341°N 83.1442°E
- Length: 47 km (29 mi)

The Zeledeyeva (Russian: Зеледеева or Зеледеево Zeledeyevo) is a river in Krasnoyarsk Krai, Russia. Its source is in the Byrranga Mountains. It flows across desolate tundra regions into the Kara Sea. The Zeledeyeva freezes up in late September or early October and stays under the ice until June. It is 149 kilometres (93 mi) long.

== History ==
In 1922, while leading a geological expedition, Nikolay Urvantsev came across a small hut made of driftwood, 2 kilometres (1.2 mi) from the estuary of the Zeledeyeva River. He and his party found there the lost mail of Roald Amundsen's 1919 Arctic expedition trusted to crew members Peter Tessem and Paul Knutsen. The mail and scientific data that the two ill-fated Norwegians had been carrying was lying abandoned on the Kara Sea shore strewn about by the bears.

This river is now within the Great Arctic State Nature Reserve, the largest nature reserve of Russia and one of the biggest in the world.
