= Lukoyanovsky Uyezd =

Lukoyanovsky Uyezd (Лукояновский уезд) was one of the subdivisions of the Nizhny Novgorod Governorate of the Russian Empire. It was situated in the southeastern part of the governorate. Its administrative centre was Lukoyanov.

== Demographics ==
At the time of the Russian Empire Census of 1897, Lukoyanovsky Uyezd had a population of 193,454. Of these, 85.2% spoke Russian, 14.3% Mordvin and 0.3% Belarusian as their native language.
