= Makaryevsky Uyezd (Kostroma Governorate) =

Uyezd of the Kostroma Governorate, Russian Empire

Makaryevsky Uyezd (Russian: Макарьевский уезд) was one of the subdivisions of the Kostroma Governorate of the Russian Empire. It was situated in the southern part of the governorate. Its administrative centre was Makaryev.

== Demographics ==
At the time of the Russian Empire Census of 1897, Makaryevsky Uyezd had a population of 144,571. Of these, 99.9% spoke Russian as their native language.
