= Valery Taliev =

Russian botanist (1872–1932)

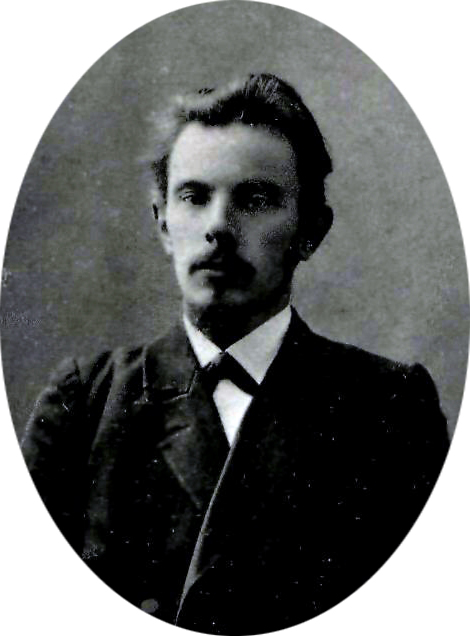
- Born: 22 February 1872; Lukoyanov, Nizhny Novgorod Province, Russian Empire
- Died: 21 February 1932 (aged 59); Moscow
- Education: Kazan University, Kharkiv University
- Known for: Anthropogenic concept of plant spreading and evolution
- Scientific career
- Workplaces: Kharkiv University, Moscow Agricultural Academy
- Author abbrev. (botany): Taliev

Valery Ivanovich Taliev (Валерий Иванович Талиев; 22 February 1872 – 21 February 1932) was a Russian botanist and evolutionary biologist, best known for the concept of the role of man in the spreading of plants during the Holocene and for his evolutionary ideas. He is considered as one of the first natural scientists who explored the importance of anthropogenic factors in the evolution and geographic distribution of higher plants.

== Life ==
Valery Taliev was born in a small town of Lukoyanov of the Nizhny Novgorod Province, in the family of a teacher of the Mordovian ethnicity. After graduation from regional school in 1883, he attended a gymnasium of the Institute of History and Philology of the town of Nizhyn. Between 1890 and 1894, he studied natural history at the faculty of physics and mathematics of Kazan University and then at the medical faculty of Kharkiv University. He worked as a military medical doctor until he successfully passed the exams for Master’s Degree at Kharkiv University in 1899. In 1890, he was appointed for the position of privatdozent at Kharkiv University. In 1916, Taliev defended his Doctoral Thesis in Petrograd University titled “A study of the process of species formation in living nature”. In 1917, he was selected as a Dean of the Natural History Section of Kharkiv People’s University. In 1918, Taliev was nominated for the Professor position of Petrovsky (later Timiryazev) Agricultural Academy.

== Taliev as educator ==
Taliev was the author of a very popular botany textbook for agricultural, pedagogical and other higher educational institutions named "Fundamentals of Botany in Evolutionary Presentation" (first edition, 1907; sixth edition, 1931) and of many other manuals for students. For a half a century, students of many universities in Russia and the USSR learned to identify higher plants according to Taliev’s guides. In addition, Taliev compiled the guides for meadow and weed plants, which were reprinted several times. Valery Taliev was a masterful populariser of scientific knowledge. His books “The Structure and Life of Plants” (1924), “The Unity of Life” (1925), and “The Biology of our Plants” (1925) are examples of Russian popular science literature.

== Work on botany ==
Valery Taliev was one of the first scientists who investigated the importance of anthropogenic factors in the evolution and spreading of plants. He outlined major parameters of the origin and spreading of weed plants, of the flora of riverbanks, and proposed a direct role of man in changing the balance between forests and steppes. The phenomenon of steppe floral communities over riverbanks is usually explained by the concept of glacial refugia. Taliev developed an alternative anthropogenic concept for the explanation of the origin of these plants rejecting the relict character of flora present on limestone, chalk, and sand deposits and considering these deposits as the consequences of human activity that destroyed upper soil layers. Although the glacial refugia concept is now widely accepted, it is also evident that, during the Holocene, the post-glacial spreading of plants was facilitated and constrained by human activity, and determination of the level of human impact and its direction is an important scientific task. Taliev viewed weed flora as invasive, having the southern origin, and evolved in drier continental climates. He mentioned the characteristic features of weeds as their adaptation to keep humidity and decrease transpiration which is now explained by the features and type of their photosynthetic metabolism. The anthropogenic factor, according to Taliev, was also essential in the formation of steppes. Taliev considered the absence of forest in southern Russia as a consequence of the activity of the early settlers who destroyed forests and opened the new areas for plant spreading.

== Work on evolution ==
Taliev considered that the evolutionary process is not derivable from one stereotype scheme and could proceed by different ways. He analyzed multiple cases of evolutionary development in the defined directions and mentioned that evolution involves the building up of new pathways over already existing cycles of individual development. Taliev explained directed evolution by the physical and chemical reasons and suggested that in the course of evolution, repetitive phenomena or a progressive increase in a morphological or physiological feature, or, conversely, its weakening, can be associated with the concept of chemical series, such as in hydrocarbons. Thus, Taliev anticipated the role of anisotropy of chemical reactions in biological evolution, which is currently considered as an important basis of evolutionary pattern formation. Based on the geographical distribution of plants, Taliev related the reason for the splitting of characters to the external conditions, considering that polychroism and polymorphism in plants are associated with a certain geographical area defined as the “center of speciation”. He represented the speciation in the genus Tulipa in the form of a stream flowing out of the primary center, common to a whole group of adjacent systematic lines, and gradually fading in its diversity, in the transition to new conditions, a more or less significant outbreak of a new speciation process resulting in a new evolutionary adaptation. In the ideas of the series of variability he anticipated the law of homological series of Nikolai Vavilov, while in the concept of center of speciation he anticipated Vavilov's concept of species and the centers of their origin. In relation to post-glacial events, Taliev linked the evolutionary variability of plants to their spreading to new geographical areas determined by human activity. The quantitative side of evolution, according to Taliev, is determined by the principle that he defined as the principle of maximum productivity. It corresponds to the maximum power principle of Lotka. This principle explains the property of ascendency, i.e. the ability of ecosystems to prevail against disturbance through the autocatalytic feedbacks incorporated in their organization.
