= Tyosha =

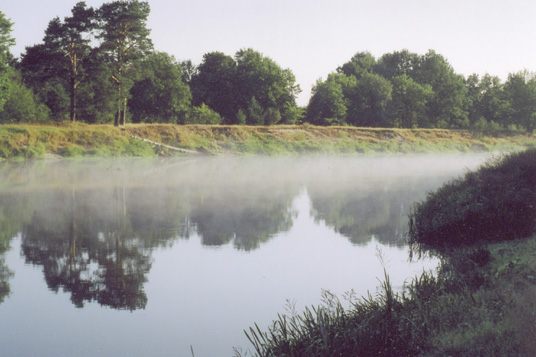
- Native name: Тёша (Russian)

Location
- Country: Russia

Physical characteristics
- Mouth: Oka
  - coordinates: 55°38′03″N 42°08′51″E
- Length: 311 km (193 mi)
- Basin size: 7,800 km^{2} (3,000 sq mi)

Basin features
- Progression: Oka→ Volga→ Caspian Sea

The Tyosha (Russian: Тёша) is a river in Nizhny Novgorod Oblast in Russia, a right tributary of the Oka. The length of the river is 311 kilometres (193 mi). The area of its basin is 7,800 square kilometres (3,000 sq mi). The Tyosha freezes up in November - first half of December and stays icebound until the second half of March - first half of April. Its biggest tributary is the Seryozha. The city of Arzamas is located on the Tyosha.
