= Gorbatovsky Uyezd =

Gorbatovsky Uyezd (Горбатовский уезд) was one of the subdivisions of the Nizhny Novgorod Governorate of the Russian Empire. It was situated in the western part of the governorate. Its administrative centre was Gorbatov.

== Demographics ==
At the time of the Russian Empire Census of 1897, Gorbatovsky Uyezd had a population of 134,160. Of these, 99.9% spoke Russian and 0.1% spoke Mordvin as their native language.
