= Lukoyanov =

Town in Nizhny Novgorod Oblast, Russia

Lukoyanov Лукоянов
- Town
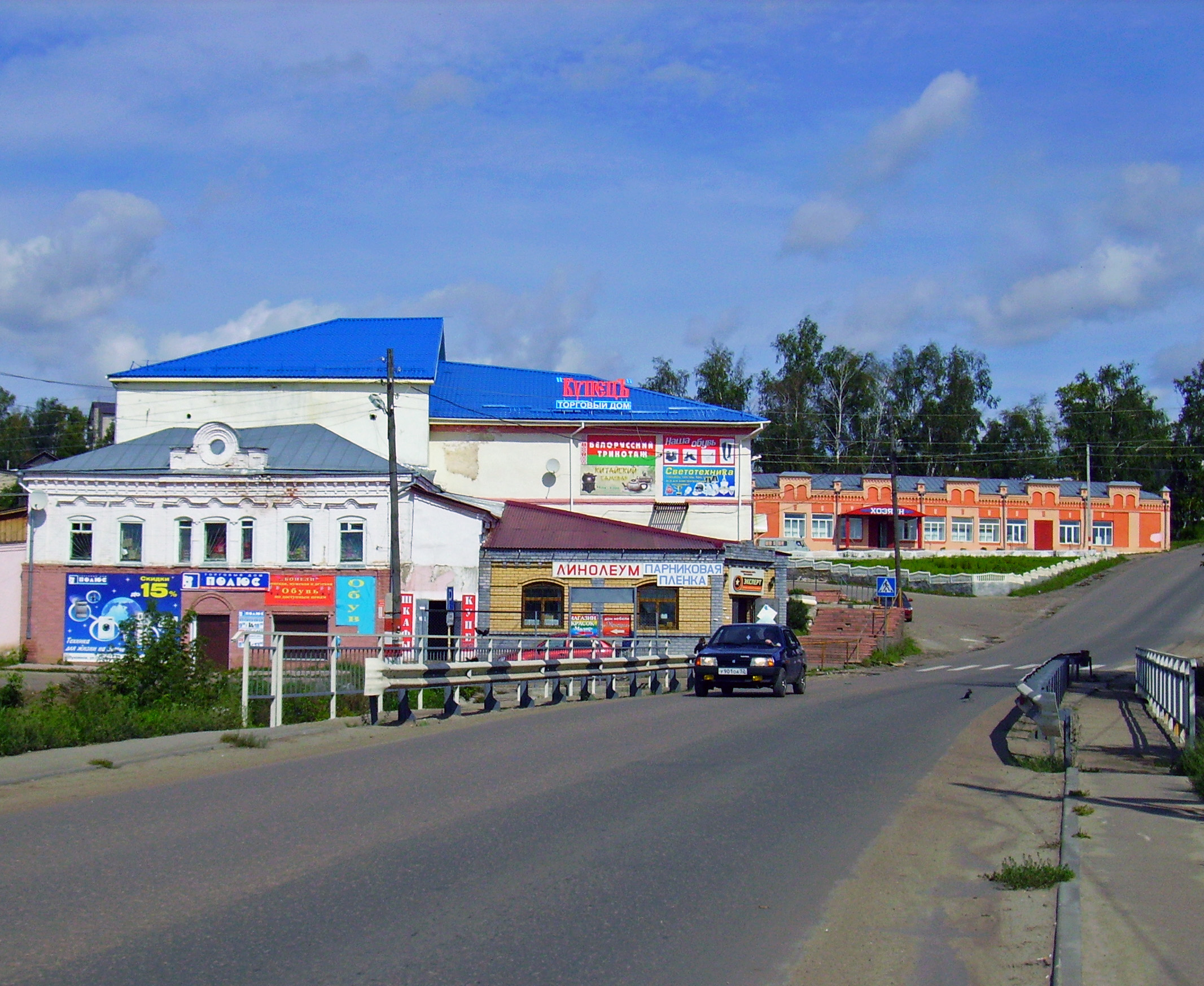
- Bridge across the Khvoshchyovka River in Lukoyanov

- Coat of arms
- Interactive map of Lukoyanov
- Location of Lukoyanov Lukoyanov (Nizhny Novgorod Oblast)
- Coordinates: 55°02′N 44°29′E
- Country: Russia
- Federal subject: Nizhny Novgorod Oblast
- Administrative district: Lukoyanovsky District
- Town of district significanceSelsoviet: Lukoyanov
- Founded: 16th century
- Town status since: 1779

Population (2010 Census)
  - Total: 14,951
  - Estimate (2021): 12,652 (−15.4%)

Administrative status
  - Capital of: Lukoyanovsky District, town of district significance of Lukoyanov

Municipal status
  - Municipal district: Lukoyanovsky Municipal District
  - Urban settlement: Lukoyanov Urban Settlement
  - Capital of: Lukoyanovsky Municipal District, Lukoyanov Urban Settlement
- Time zone: UTC+3 (MSK)
- Postal codes: 607800, 607802, 607849
- OKTMO ID: 22639101001
- Website: www.luk-of.ru

Lukoyanov (Russian: Лукоя́нов) is a town and the administrative center of Lukoyanovsky District in Nizhny Novgorod Oblast, Russia, located on the Tyosha River, 173 kilometers (107 mi) south of Nizhny Novgorod, the administrative center of the oblast. Population: 14,951 (2010 census); 12,856 (2002 census); 12,276 (1989 Soviet census).

== History ==
It was established in the 16th century and was granted town status in 1779.

== Administrative and municipal status ==
Within the framework of administrative divisions, Lukoyanov serves as the administrative center of Lukoyanovsky District. As an administrative division, it is, together with the selo of Ulyanovo, incorporated within Lukoyanovsky District as the town of district significance of Lukoyanov. As a municipal division, the town of district significance of Lukoyanov is incorporated within Lukoyanovsky Municipal District as Lukoyanov Urban Settlement.

== Geography ==
The town is located on the Tyosha River, 173 kilometers (107 mi) south of Nizhny Novgorod, the administrative center of the oblast.

=== Climate ===
Climate data for Lukoyanov (extremes 1886-present)
Month	Jan	Feb	Mar	Apr	May	Jun	Jul	Aug	Sep	Oct	Nov	Dec	Year
Record high °C (°F)	5.7 (42.3)	7.8 (46.0)	17.2 (63.0)	28.6 (83.5)	33.0 (91.4)	36.5 (97.7)	39.0 (102.2)	39.0 (102.2)	31.5 (88.7)	25.2 (77.4)	17.0 (62.6)	6.7 (44.1)	39.0 (102.2)
Mean daily maximum °C (°F)	−6.4 (20.5)	−5.5 (22.1)	0.6 (33.1)	10.9 (51.6)	19.6 (67.3)	22.9 (73.2)	25.1 (77.2)	23.2 (73.8)	16.6 (61.9)	8.5 (47.3)	0.0 (32.0)	−4.8 (23.4)	9.2 (48.6)
Daily mean °C (°F)	−9.2 (15.4)	−8.8 (16.2)	−3.2 (26.2)	5.8 (42.4)	13.4 (56.1)	17.1 (62.8)	19.4 (66.9)	17.4 (63.3)	11.6 (52.9)	4.9 (40.8)	−2.4 (27.7)	−7.3 (18.9)	4.9 (40.8)
Mean daily minimum °C (°F)	−11.9 (10.6)	−11.7 (10.9)	−6.3 (20.7)	1.6 (34.9)	8.2 (46.8)	12.1 (53.8)	14.5 (58.1)	12.6 (54.7)	7.8 (46.0)	2.1 (35.8)	−4.5 (23.9)	−9.7 (14.5)	1.2 (34.2)
Record low °C (°F)	−42.1 (−43.8)	−39.1 (−38.4)	−31.0 (−23.8)	−22.4 (−8.3)	−4.6 (23.7)	−1.6 (29.1)	4.3 (39.7)	0.7 (33.3)	−6.8 (19.8)	−17.4 (0.7)	−30.8 (−23.4)	−43.2 (−45.8)	−43.2 (−45.8)
Average precipitation mm (inches)	40.8 (1.61)	31.6 (1.24)	30.7 (1.21)	35.1 (1.38)	39.8 (1.57)	65.8 (2.59)	72.0 (2.83)	64.6 (2.54)	54.7 (2.15)	51.2 (2.02)	43.2 (1.70)	46.1 (1.81)	575.6 (22.65)
Source: pogoda.ru.net

== Notable people ==
- Nikolay Urvantsev, geologist and explorer
- Valery Taliev, botanist and evolutionary biologist
