= Semyonovsky Uyezd =

Semyonovsky Uyezd (Семёновский уезд) was one of the subdivisions of the Nizhny Novgorod Governorate of the Russian Empire. It was situated in the northern part of the governorate. Its administrative centre was Semyonov.

== Demographics ==
At the time of the Russian Empire Census of 1897, Semyonovsky Uyezd had a population of 111,388. Of these, 99.9% spoke Russian as their native language.
