= Georgy Rybin =

Russian hуdrographer and explorer (1901–1974)

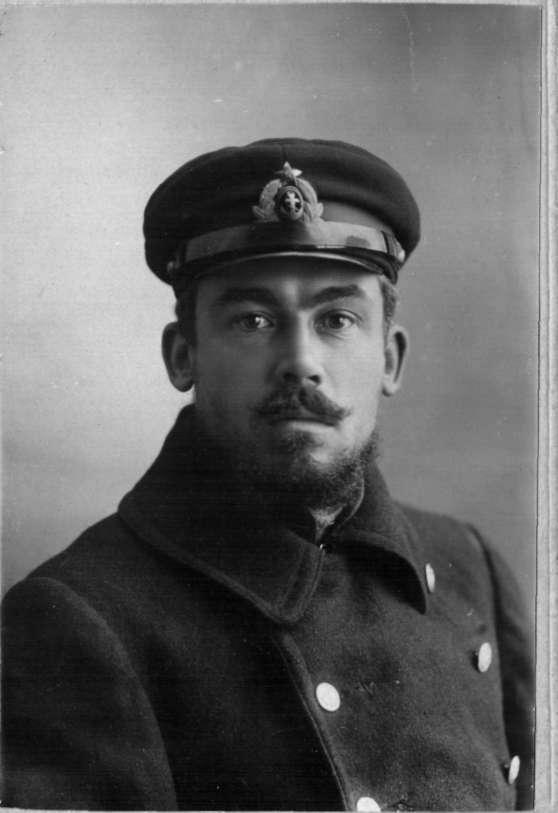
Georgy N.Rybin

Georgy Nikolaevich Rybin (Russian: Гео́ргий Никола́евич Ры́бин; April 18, 1901 in Zharkent – March 1, 1974 in Leningrad), was a Russian hуdrographer; explorer of the Arctic seas and the Baltic Sea.

== Biography ==
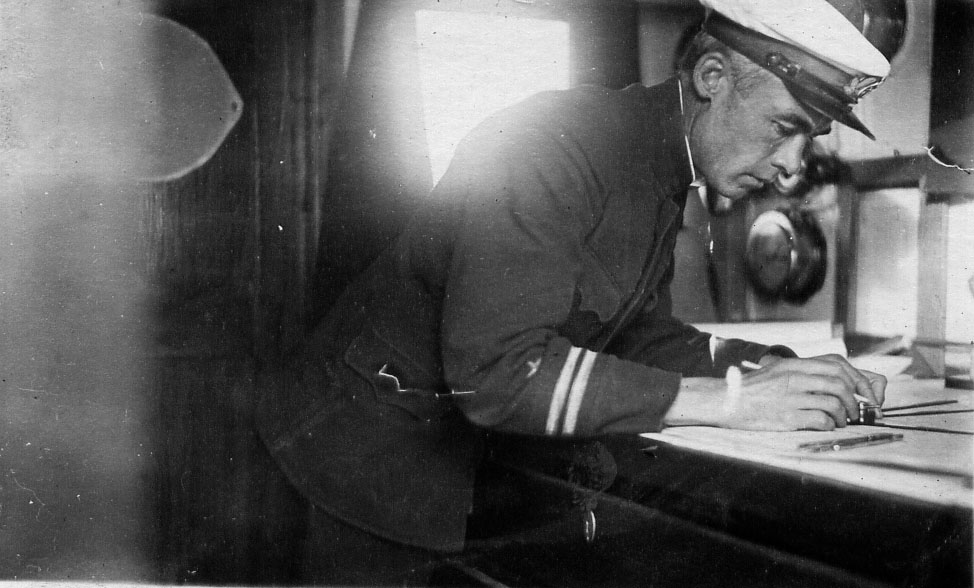
Rybin Georgy plotting

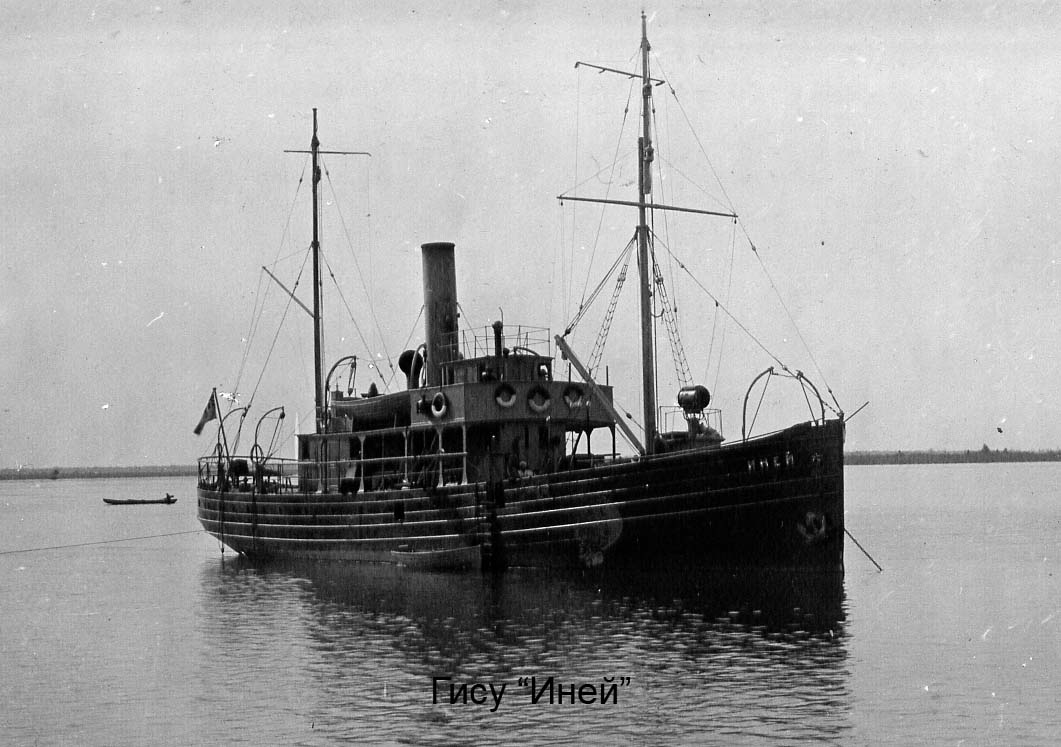
Survey vessel "Iney" in the Gulf of Ob

=== Family and childhood ===
Georgy Rybin was born into the family of a hereditary Cossack officer. To help his family, which consisted of his parents and a younger sister, he began to work in the research team of the dredging works of the Irtysh river in Omsk during his summers from 1917 to 1919.

=== Education and service ===
In 1919 he graduated from the First Omsk Men's gymnasium with a gold medal, and entered the Tomsk Technical Institute. However, the Civil war impeded his studies, and he was called to the White Army of the admiral Kolchak, to the Cossack's hundred-man unit of the 3d army headquarter. In January 1920 Georgy fell ill with typhus, then with relapsing fever.

In May 1920 he was called to the Red Army as an infantry man, in Tiumen. In September 1920 he was detached to Tomsk to continue his studies in the Tomsk Technical Institute, but there were no more vacancies there. So, Rybin had to enter the Tomsk Land-use Technical School.

=== Survey in Ubekosibir ===
After the March 1921 trade contract between RSFSR, the United Kingdom, and Norway, the Kara Trade Expedition was organized under personal leadership of V. I. Lenin. After passing his exams, in summer of 1921 Georgy Rybin entered military service again in the Detached Hydrographic Party of the Ubekosibir (Убекосибирь, Siberian Department of Navigation Safety (Note: Убекосибирь: Upravlenie bezopasnosti korablevozhdeniya Sibir)). He was a sounding steersman of the survey vessel No.141.

In 1922 Georgy left his studies and began his first officer's post as an interpreter of the 1st Ob pilot distance. Then he was a foreman on different survey vessels: "Iney", "Orlik", "Anna", "Priboy", "Toros", "Tsirkul". During this period, he discovered, documented, and photographed the skeleton of Peter Tessem, member of Amundsen's expedition aboard Maud.

In 1925 Rybin was appointed magnetic deviation chief of the Ob River basin. In 1927 he passed his exams and received an external degree from the Hydrographic college. In 1928 he passed his exams and received an external degree from the Odessa Navigation College and was qualified as a navigator.

In 1930 Georgy finished the special courses of the commanding staff of the Red Navy at the oldest college in Russia – the Frunze Naval College (hydrographic class). He became the commander of survey vessel "Tsyrkul" at the Yenisei pilot distance of the Ubekosibir.

=== Service at Baltic ===
In 1933 the responsibility for navigation safety in the northern seas was transferred to GlavSevMorPut, and Rybin with all the hydrographers was moved to Leningrad. Here he was appointed chief foreman of the Ubekobalt (Baltic Department of the Navigation Safety); then, commander of HS "Ost"; then, HS group chief.

In 1937 Georgy Rybin entered the Navy Academy – the highest Navy school in Russia which trains the staff for Navy headquarters.

=== War ===
He graduated in August 1941, when the Wehrmacht was already close to Leningrad. He became the chief of the Mobile hydrographic group; then, in November, the deputy-chief of the Baltic hydrographic service.

Georguy Ivanovich Zima was the chief of the Baltic hydrographic service. According to his son, Zima told to G. Rybin: "Time is difficult, it's impossible to trust to somebody. Only a cossack can trust to a cossack". Zima came from Kuban cossacks, Rybin from Siberian cossacks.

During the siege in 1942 Georgy suffered from dystrophy.

The most important role of the hydrographers during the siege was the coordination of the artillery shooting. It consisted, first of all, of the precise positioning of the Navy batteries: ships, onshore, railway and anti-aircraft. After performing the batteries formulaires, the task was to position the enemy batteries. That task was performed by geodesical intersection of the flashes. One of the intersection points was located on top of the St Isaac Cathedral.

In November 1941 Rybin was awarded a gold Swiss watch for the geodesical insurance of the artillery shooting. The watch can now be seen in the museum of the Head Department of the Navigation and Oceanography.

In 1944, after reconquering Estonia, the Baltic hydrographic service was moved to Tallinn (Kreuzwaldi 13). Rybin and his family (wife and son) lived on the fourth floor of the same building. His daughter was born in 1946. His son studied at the Russian school in Toompea.

The main task of the hydrographic service in 1944-1945 was the fastest putting the reconquered ports and navaids into operation. Thus, George Rybin with the mobile groups of the hydrographers, moved along the Baltic coast to south- west, took part in the East- Prussian operation and Konigsberg assault.

=== After war ===
In 1945 the Baltic fleet was divided into 4th fleet, with the main base in Pillau, and 8th fleet, with the main base in Tallinn. Rybin was appointed the Chief of the 4th fleet hydrographic service, and moved to Königsberg. He entered the CPSU. With his family, he lived in a cottage, and used the Horch car with a sailor as a driver. The main task of the hydrographers in that period was minesweeping.

In 1947 Georgy Rybin moved to Leningrad where he was appointed the professor of geodesy and hydrography at the Naval college named after Frunze - the eldest existing high school in Russia, in former times- one of the most privileged.

Georgy Rybin was the model of a Russian officer - always polite, smart, accurate. He used to start the dance parties with the first tour of waltz.

== Memory ==
Rybin-yaha (1923)- a river, flowing into the Gulf of Ob, Kara Sea( Mouth 69º01' N 72º31’ Е). Rybin was the first person to put the river on the charts (Russian charts 15337, 13335).

Rybin seamount (1999)- a seamount in the Atlantic Ocean (31°47'2N, 12°49'4W), north-west of the Canary Islands, with a minimum depth of 412 meters compared to the surrounding depths of 2800–3600 meters.The relative height of the seamount is 2788 meters.

In 1999, the Commission for Geographical names of the International Hydrographic Organization and the Intergovernmental Oceanographic committee named an underwater mount with the smallest depth of 412 meters and the relative height of 2700 meters after Georgy – Rybin seamount. The mount was discovered in 1979 by the Baltic Oceanographic expedition of the Russian navy.

== See also ==
- Russian Hydrographic Service
