= Kovrovsky Uyezd =

Administrative subdivision of the Vladimir Governorate

Kovrovsky Uyezd (Ковровский уезд) was one of the subdivisions of the Vladimir Governorate of the Russian Empire. It was situated in the eastern part of the governorate. Its administrative centre was Kovrov.

== Demographics ==
At the time of the Russian Empire Census of 1897, Kovrovsky Uyezd had a population of 109,861. Of these, 99.8% spoke Russian as their native language.
