= Yuryevsky Uyezd (Vladimir Governorate) =

Uyezd of the Vladimir Governorate, Russian Empire

Yuryevsky Uyezd (Юрьевский уезд) was one of the subdivisions of the Vladimir Governorate of the Russian Empire. It was situated in the western part of the governorate. Its administrative centre was Yuryev-Polsky.

== Demographics ==
At the time of the Russian Empire Census of 1897, Yuryevsky Uyezd had a population of 92,629. Of these, 99.8% spoke Russian and 0.1% Latvian as their native language.
