= Ruslan Rybin =

Russian footballer

Personal information
- Full name: Ruslan Arkadyevich Rybin
- Date of birth: 14 January 1992 (age 34)
- Height: 1.85 m (6 ft 1 in)
- Position: Goalkeeper

Senior career*
Years	Team	Apps	(Gls)
2009	FC Chita	1	(0)
2010–2012	FC Chita-M Chita		
2012–2013	FC Selenga Ulan-Ude (amateur)		
2014–2015	FC Chita	0	(0)
- * Club domestic league appearances and goals

Ruslan Arkadyevich Rybin (Russian: Руслан Аркадьевич Рыбин; born 14 January 1992) is a former Russian professional football player.

== Club career ==
He made his Russian Football National League debut for FC Chita on 6 August 2009 in a game against FC Salyut-Energiya Belgorod.
