= Arzamassky Uyezd =

Arzamassky Uyezd (Арзамасский уезд) was one of the subdivisions of the Nizhny Novgorod Governorate of the Russian Empire. It was situated in the southern part of the governorate. Its administrative centre was Arzamas.

== Demographics ==
At the time of the Russian Empire Census of 1897, Arzamassky Uyezd had a population of 138,785. Of these, 92.9% spoke Russian, 6.9% Mordvin and 0.1% Romani as their native language.
