= Sudogodsky Uyezd =

Sudogodsky Uyezd (Судогодский уезд) was one of the subdivisions of the Vladimir Governorate of the Russian Empire. It was situated in the southern part of the governorate. Its administrative centre was Sudogda.

== Demographics ==
At the time of the Russian Empire Census of 1897, Sudogodsky Uyezd had a population of 96,798. Of these, 99.9% spoke Russian as their native language.
