= Suzdalsky Uyezd =

Suzdalsky Uyezd (Суздальский уезд) was one of the subdivisions of the Vladimir Governorate of the Russian Empire. It was situated in the northern part of the governorate. Its administrative centre was Suzdal.

== Demographics ==
At the time of the Russian Empire Census of 1897, Suzdalsky Uyezd had a population of 107,708. Of these, 99.9% spoke Russian as their native language.
