= Nizhny Novgorod Governorate =

1714–1929 unit of Russia

Coordinates: 56.3269°N 44.0075°E

Nizhny Novgorod Governorate Нижегородская губерния
- Governorate of the Russian Empire (1714–1917), Russian Republic, and RSFSR (1917–1929)
- 1714–1929
- Coat of arms

- Location in the Russian Empire
- Capital: Nizhny Novgorod
- Area
- 51,252 km^{2} (19,789 sq mi)
- Population
  - 1897: 1,584,774
- History
  - Established: January 1714
  - Disestablished: 14 January 1929
Preceded by	Succeeded by
Kazan Governorate; Nizhegorodsky Uyezd	Nizhny Novgorod Oblast

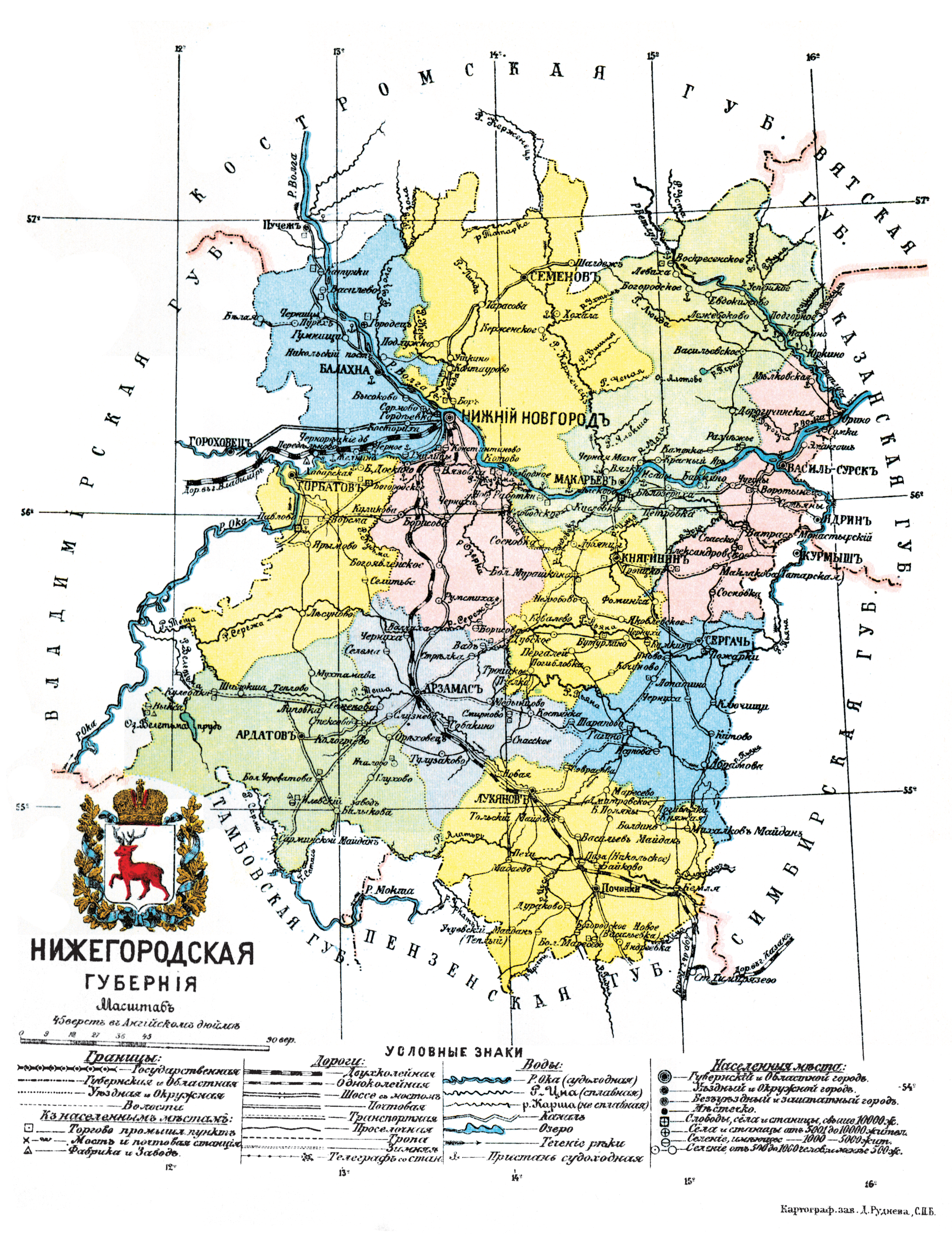
Map of Nizhny Novgorod Governorate. 1913

Nizhny Novgorod Governorate (Note: Russian: Нижегородская губерния, pre-1918: Нижегородская губернія, romanized: Nizhegorodskaya guberniya) was an administrative-territorial unit (guberniya) of the Russian Empire, Russian Republic, and the Russian SFSR, roughly corresponding to the Upper and Middle Volga region and what is now most of the Nizhny Novgorod Oblast. In the early 20th Century, Nizhny Novgorod Governorate bordered Kostroma and Vyatka governorates to the north, Vladimir Governorate to the west, Kazan and Simbirsk governorates to the east, and Penza with Tambov governorates to the south.

In the early 18th Century, Nizhny Novgorod Governorate was included in Kazan Governorate, from 1708–1714, and 1717–1719. The Reform of Peter the Great formed the newly governorate from 1714 to 1779. in the Reign of Catherine the Great, the governorate was reorganized to the Viceroyalty until 1796. In 1929 the governorate was disestablished, as a result of the new administrative reform, where the governorate was again reorganized to the Oblast. The governorate's administrative center was seated in Nizhny Novgorod and consisted of eleven uezds.

== Geography ==
Nizhny Novgorod Governorate was bordered by the following governorates: the Vladimir Governorate to the west, Kostroma and Vyatka governorates to the north, Kazan and Simbirsk governorates to the east, and Penza and Tambov governorates to the south.

The area of the governorate was 48,421 km^{2} (18,695 sq mi) in 1847, 51,252 km^{2} (19,789 sq mi) in 1905, and 81,458 km^{2} (31,451 sq mi) in 1926.

The Oka and Volga rivers divided the governorate into two parts that differed significantly in relief, geological structure, soils, and vegetation: the northern was a lowland, and the southern was an upland.

== History ==
=== Formation of the Governorate ===
In the course of the regional reform of Peter I in 1708, Nizhny Novgorod Governorate, was included in the Kazan Governorate. In January 1714, a new Nizhny Novgorod Governorate separated from the northwestern part of the Kazan Governorate. In addition to Nizhny Novgorod, including the cities of Alatyr, Arzamas, Balakhna, Vasilsursk, Gorokhovets, Kurmysh, Yuryevets, Yadrin with adjacent territories. In 1717, the Governorate was abolished, and the Governorate again merged with the Kazan Governorate.

On May 29, 1719, as a result of the Second Peter I's reform, the Nizhny Novgorod Governorate has recreated again. It included 3 provinces: Alatyr, Arzamas, Nizhny Novgorod, and 7 cities.

In the course of Catherine II's administrative reform on September 5, 1779, the Nizhny Novgorod Viceroyalty was established, which included the former Nizhny Novgorod Governorate, as well as parts of the previously formed Ryazan and Vladimir viceroyalties, and a part of the Kazan Governorate.

On December 12, 1796, under Paul I, the Nizhny Novgorod Viceroyalty was renamed a Governorate.

In October 1797, the area of the Nizhny Novgorod Governorate was increased at the expense of the territories received during the partition of the Penza Governorate. After the accession to the throne of Alexander I on September 9, 1801, the Penza Governorate was restored to its previous area.

In connection with the Zemstvo reform, in 1865, the institute of local government introduced the Zemstvo in the Nizhny Novgorod Governorate.

The Nizhny Novgorod Governorate was among the 17 regions recognized as seriously affected during the famine of 1891–1892.

After the October Revolution of 1917, the Nizhny Novgorod Governorate became part of the Russian Soviet Federative Socialist Republic (RSFSR) formed in 1918.

In 1922, the Governorate included the Varnavinsky and Vetluzhsky districts of the Kostroma Governorate, the Kurmyshsky district of the Simbirsk Governorate, and a small part of the Tambov Governorate.

By a decree of the Presidium of the All-Russian Central Executive Committee on January 14, 1929, the Governorates were completely abolished. On the territory of the Nizhny Novgorod Governorate, the Nizhny Novgorod Oblast was formed, which also included the territories of the abolished Vyatka Governorate and small sections of the Vladimir and Kostroma governorates.

== Subdivisions ==
- Ardatovsky Uyezd (Ardatov)
- Arzamassky Uyezd (Arzamas)
- Balakhninsky Uyezd (Balakhna)
- Vasilsursky Uyezd (Vasilsursk)
- Gorbatovsky Uyezd (Gorbatov)
- Knyagininsky Uyezd (Knyaginino)
- Lukoyanovsky Uyezd (Lukoyanov)
- Makaryevsky Uyezd (Makaryevo)
- Nizhegorodsky Uyezd (Nizhny Novgorod)
- Semyonovsky Uyezd (Semyonov)
- Sergachsky Uyezd (Sergach)
