= Yuryevetsky Uyezd =

Subdivision of the Russian Empire

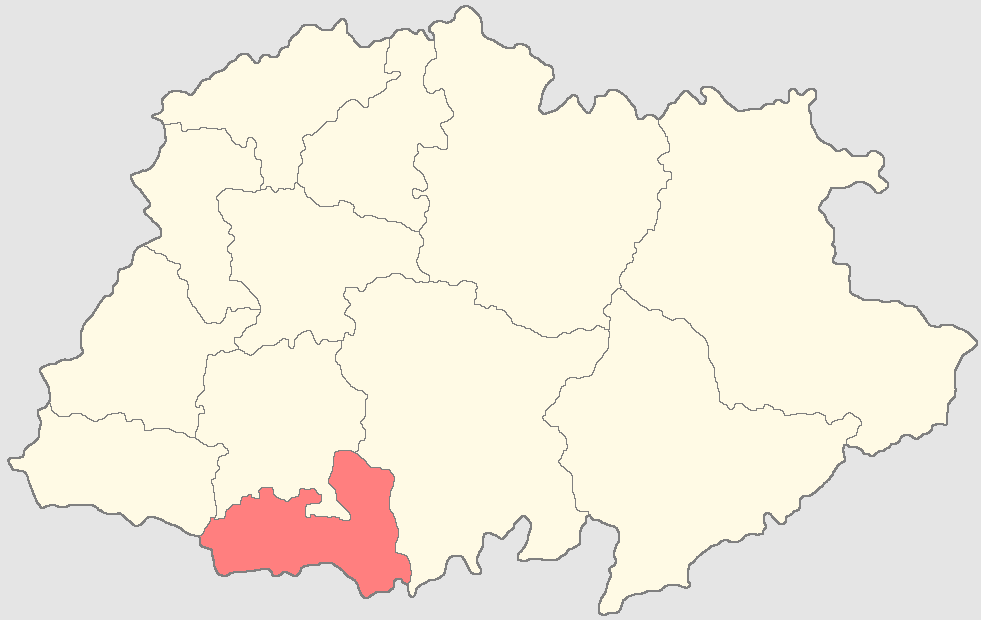

Yuryevetsky Uyezd (Юрьевецкий уезд) was one of the subdivisions of the Kostroma Governorate of the Russian Empire. It was situated in the southwestern part of the governorate. Its administrative centre was Yuryevets.

== Demographics ==
At the time of the Russian Empire Census of 1897, Yuryevetsky Uyezd had a population of 121,498. Of these, 99.9% spoke Russian as their native language.
