= Balakhninsky Uyezd =

Subdivision of the Nizhny Novgorod Governoate, Russian Empire

Balakhninsky Uyezd (Russian: Балахнинский уезд) was one of the subdivisions of the Nizhny Novgorod Governorate of the Russian Empire. It was situated in the northwestern part of the governorate. Its administrative centre was Balakhna.

== Demographics ==
At the time of the Russian Empire Census of 1897, Balakhninsky Uyezd had a population of 141,694. Of these, 99.5% spoke Russian, 0.1% Polish, 0.1% Belarusian, 0.1% Tatar and 0.1% German as their native language.
