= Knyaginino, Nizhny Novgorod Oblast =

Town in Nizhny Novgorod Oblast, Russia

Knyaginino Княгинино
- Town
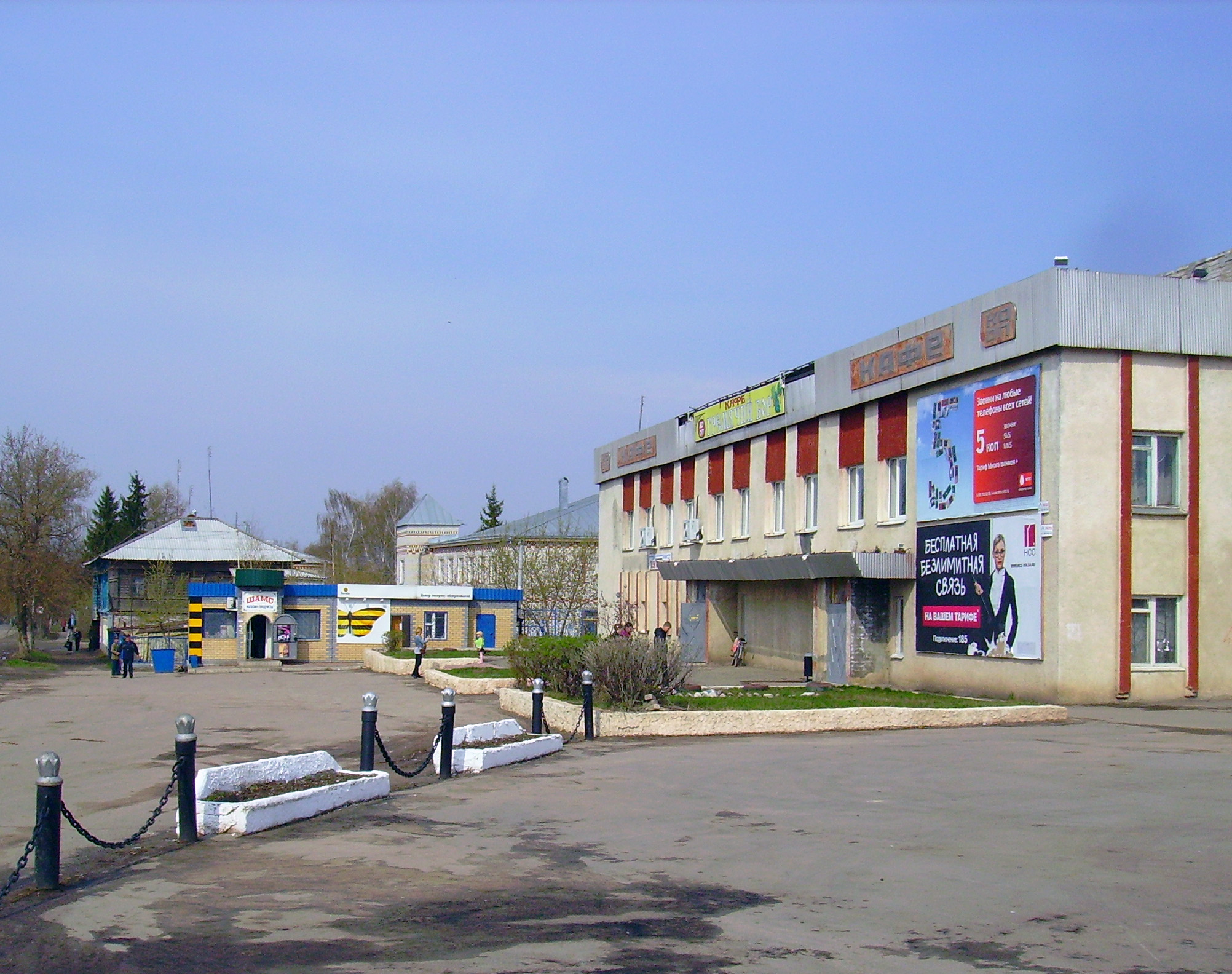
- Central Knyaginino

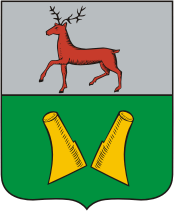
- Coat of arms
- Interactive map of Knyaginino
- Location of Knyaginino Knyaginino (Nizhny Novgorod Oblast)
- Coordinates: 55°49′N 45°02′E
- Country: Russia
- Federal subject: Nizhny Novgorod Oblast
- Administrative district: Knyagininsky District
- Town of district significanceSelsoviet: Knyaginino
- First mentioned: second half of the 16th century
- Town status since: 1998

Population (2010 Census)
  - Total: 6,708
  - Estimate (2021): 6,447 (−3.9%)

Administrative status
  - Capital of: Knyagininsky District, town of district significance of Knyaginino

Municipal status
  - Municipal district: Knyagininsky Municipal District
  - Urban settlement: Knyaginino Urban Settlement
  - Capital of: Knyagininsky Municipal District, Knyaginino Urban Settlement
- Time zone: UTC+3 (MSK)
- Postal code: 606340
- OKTMO ID: 22633101001

Knyaginino (Russian: Княги́нино) is a town and the administrative center of Knyagininsky District in Nizhny Novgorod Oblast, Russia, located on the Imza River, 107 kilometers (66 mi) southeast of Nizhny Novgorod, the administrative center of the oblast. Population: 6,708 (2010 census); 6,838 (2002 census); 6,374 (1989 Soviet census).

== History ==
It was first mentioned in the second half of the 16th century as an estate of Mikhail Vorotynsky. In 1779, it was granted town rights. At that time, it was known as Knyaginin (Княгинин); this name was used until 1917. In 1926, it was demoted to a rural locality (selo) status. It was granted urban-type settlement status in 1968 and town status in 1998.

== Administrative and municipal status ==
Within the framework of administrative divisions, Knyaginino serves as the administrative center of Knyagininsky District. As an administrative division, it is, together with the village of Gorshkovo, incorporated within Knyagininsky District as the town of district significance of Knyaginino. As a municipal division, the town of district significance of Knyaginino is incorporated within Knyagininsky Municipal District as Knyaginino Urban Settlement.

== Economy ==
Major industrial enterprises in Knyaginino include a milk plant, a textile factory, and a fur manufacture.
