= Vladimir Governorate =

1796–1929 unit of Russia

Vladimir Governorate Владимирская губерния
- Governorate of the Russian Empire
- 1796–1929
- Coat of arms

- Location in the Russian Empire
- Capital: Vladimir
- Area
  - 1897: 45,910 km^{2} (17,730 sq mi)
- Population
  - 1897: 1,515,691
- History
  - Established: 1 November 1796
  - Disestablished: 1 October 1929
Preceded by	Succeeded by
Vladimir Viceroyalty	Vladimir Okrug

Vladimir Governorate (Russian: Владимирская губерния, romanized: Vladimirskaya guberniya) was an administrative-territorial unit (guberniya) of the Russian Empire, the Russian Republic and the Russian SFSR, which existed in 1796–1929.

== History ==
Until 1719 – Vladimirsky Uyezd of the Zamoskovny Krai within the Tsardom of Russia.

In 1719, the Vladimir Province was formed as part of Moscow Governorate. In 1778, an independent Vladimir Viceroyalty was formed, divided into 14 uyezds. In 1796, the viceroyalty was transformed into a governorate. From 1881 to 1917, Vladimir Governorate consisted of 13 uyezds and didn't change its borders.

By the Decree of the Presidium of the All-Russian Central Executive Committee “On the formation on the territory of the Russian SFSR of administrative-territorial associations of krai and oblast significance” of 14 January 1929, from 1 October 1929, Vladimir Governorate (within borders significantly smaller than Vladimir Governorate of the Russian Empire) was abolished. The Ivanovo Industrial Oblast was formed (there's no such name in the resolution itself; the Zoning Commission under the Presidium of the All-Russian Central Executive Committee was tasked with establishing the name of the region) with its center in the city of Ivanovo-Voznesensk, consisting, as the main body, of Govenorates of Ivanovo-Voznesensk, Vladimir, Yaroslavl and Kostroma.

== Religion ==
In church terms, the Vladimir Governorate constituted the Vladimir Diocese. In 1888, there were 970 Orthodox parishes and 1,192 temples (including 18 cathedrals, 26 house churches, 1,036 rural churches and 112 parish city and cemetery churches).

There was one Evangelical church, two Jewish houses of worship.
