= There's no money, but hang in there =

Well-known phrase by Russian prime minister Dmitri Medvedev

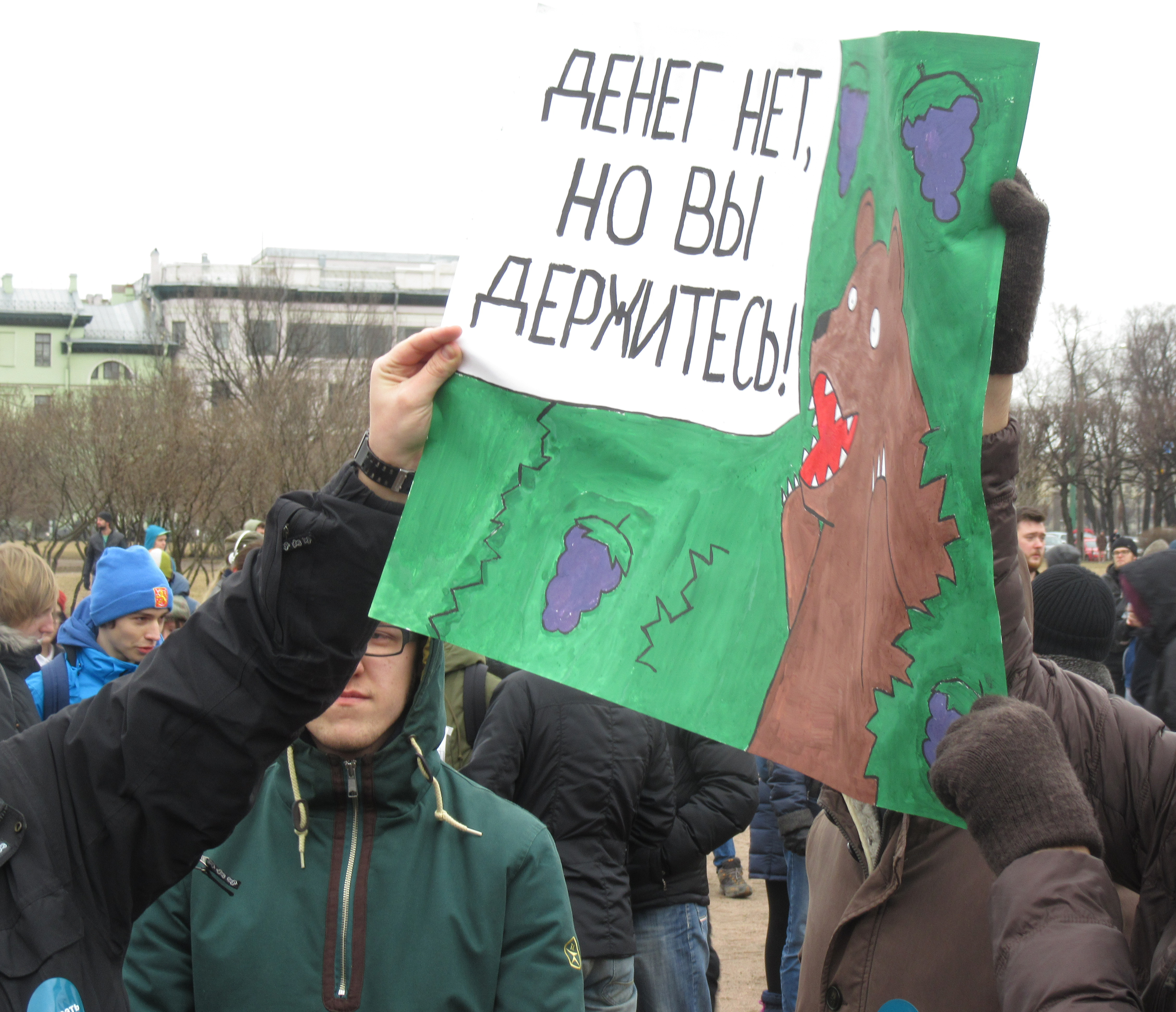
A caricature with the catchphrase during 2018 Russian protests in Saint Petersburg

"There's no money, but hang in there" (Russian: «Денег нет, но вы держитесь») is a Russian catchphrase derived from a dismissive reply of Russian then-Prime Minister Dmitry Medvedev to a pensioner from the Russian-occupied Crimea's complaint about a small pension in 2016. It was variously translated into English as "There's just no money. But you take care", "There is no money. But be strong", etc. The catchphrase later became an Internet meme, mocking official wishes to stay resilient amid economic negligence.

== Origin ==
On 23 May 2016, Dmitry Medvedev, then Prime Minister of Russia, visited the town of Feodosia in Crimea, which had been annexed by Russia from Ukraine two years earlier. In a widely shared video Medvedev was pummeled by questions from irate locals who complained about their Russian pensions not being indexed to the rising cost of living. Initially, Medvedev tried to dismiss questioning by saying "pensions are a separate topic". One off-camera pensioner, Anna Buyanova, said: "You said there will be indexation, where is it in Crimea? What is 8,000 (rubles)? That's miserable. They wipe their feet on us here! It's impossible to live off the pension − the prices are crazy". Medvedev replied: "It (indexation) is not there, we didn't approve it at all. There's just no money right now. We'll find the money and do the indexing. You hang in here, all the best to you, have a nice day, stay strong!"

Medvedev then made a hasty retreat and a few hours later posted to his Instagram account a photograph of a Crimean rainbow. Buyanova's complaint was not resolved. According to her, she was promised 11,000 rubles (around US$164 at the time), but by April 2017 only an increase in the living wage was made, while the pension rose merely to 8,500 rubles (around US$146 at the time).

== See also ==
- He Is Not Dimon to You
- "Let them eat cake"
- Thoughts and prayers
