= 2017–2018 Russian protests =

Anti-corruption street protests

- Part of opposition to Vladimir Putin in Russia
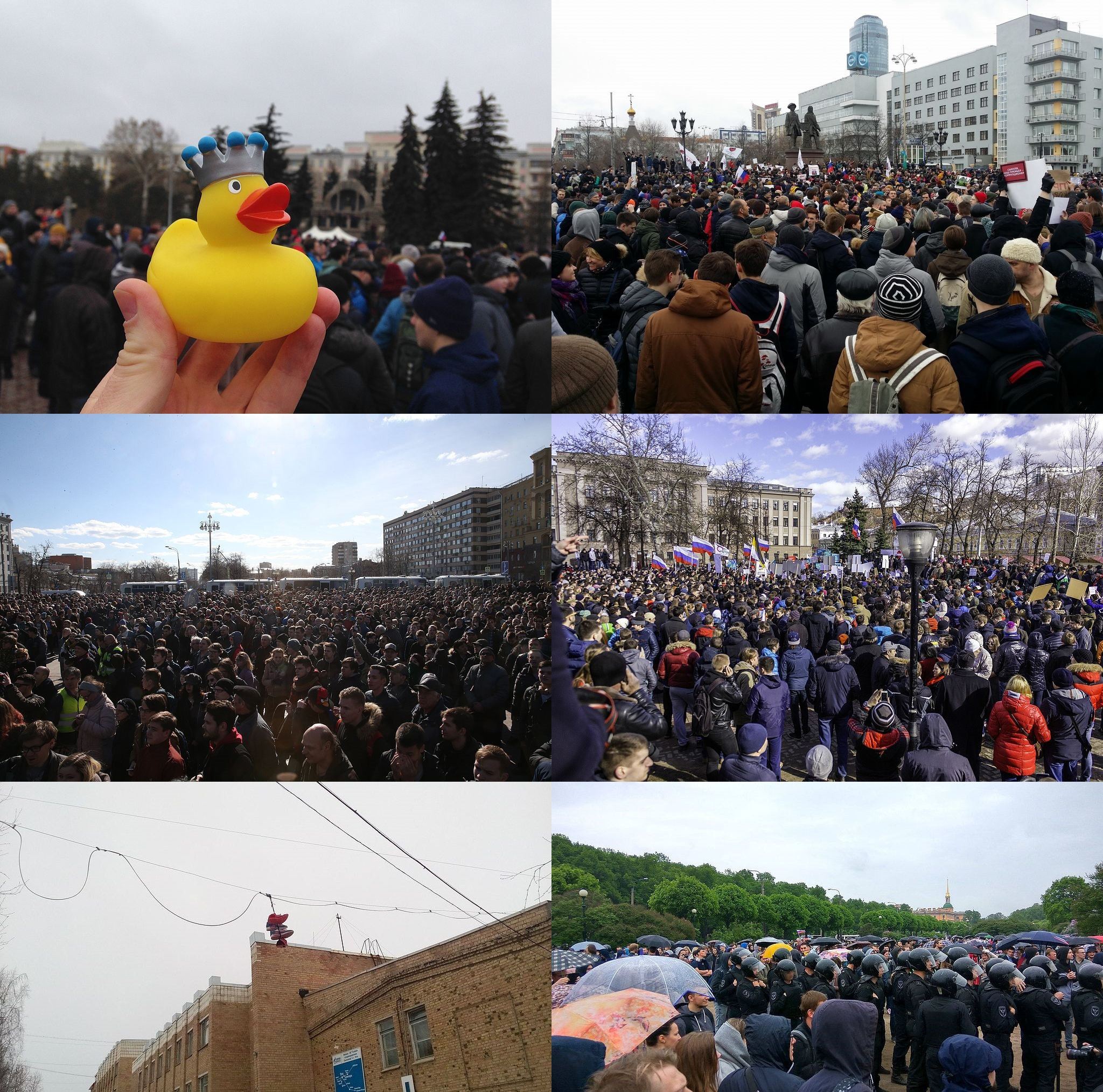
- Rallies all across Russia, March–June 2017; Clockwise from top left: Protests in Chelyabinsk – The tsar-duck is a reference to duck's house in Dmitry Medvedev's dacha; Protests in Yekaterinburg; People waving national flags in Nizhny Novgorod; Protests in Saint Petersburg on Russia Day; Sneakers, also the symbol of Anti-corruption protests, represents the sneakers of Prime-minister Medvedev, which he ordered on the Internet through fake e-mail; The largest rally that took place in Moscow
- Date: 26 March 2017 – 28 October 2018: 26–28 March 2017; 29 April 2017; 14 May 2017 (in Moscow); 12 June 2017; 7 October 2017; 5 November 2017; 28 January 2018; March–May 2018 (in Moscow Oblast suburbs); 27 March 2018 (in Kemerovo); 2 April 2018 (in Yekaterinburg); 30 April 2018 (in Moscow); 1 May 2018 (in Saint Petersburg); 5 May 2018; 13 May 2018 (in Moscow); 1 July 2018; 29 July 2018; 15 August 2018 (in Moscow); 9 September 2018; 17 September 2018 (in Vladivostok); 28 October 2018 (in Saint Petersburg)
- Location: More than 154 сities and towns across Russia: Moscow, Saint-Petersburg, Novosibirsk, Yekaterinburg, Nizhny Novgorod, Kazan, Chelyabinsk, Omsk, Samara, Rostov-on-Don, Ufa, Krasnoyarsk, Perm, Voronezh, Volgograd, Krasnodar, Saratov, Tyumen, Tolyatti, Izhevsk, Barnaul, Ulyanovsk, Irkutsk, Khabarovsk, Yaroslavl, Vladivostok, Makhachkala, Tomsk, Orenburg, Kemerovo, Novokuznetsk, Ryazan, Astrakhan, Naberezhnye Chelny, Penza, Lipetsk, Kirov, Cheboksary, Tula, Kaliningrad, Balashikha, Kursk, Sevastopol, Sochi, Stavropol, Ulan-Ude, Tver, Magnitogorsk, Ivanovo, Bryansk, Belgorod, Surgut, Vladimir, Nizhny Tagil
- Caused by: Opposition to Vladimir Putin and ruling United Russia party; Alleged corruption, particularly by Prime Minister Dmitry Medvedev, and release of He Is Not Dimon to You; Alleged election fraud, human rights violations, and political repression; Police brutality, perceived despotism, and lack of political freedom; Russia's Central Election Commission refusal to register Alexei Navalny's 2018 presidential candidacy (since December 2017); Raising of the retirement age (since June 2018); In Yekaterinburg: Refusal of Yekaterinburg mayor Yevgeny Roizman to participate in the 2017 Sverdlovsk Oblast governor elections (since May 2018); Abolition of direct elections of the mayor in Yekaterinburg (since May 2018); In Moscow: Inadequate planned demolition of apartments in Moscow (since April 2017); An ecological catastrophe unfolding around the Moscow, subsequently led to mass poisoning of children due to leakage of toxic substances from the landfill in Volokolamsk (since March 2018); In Kemerovo: A fire at the Winter Cherry complex mall in Kemerovo (since March 2018); In Vladivostok: Massive election fraud in several eastern regions (since September 2018); In Saint Petersburg: Inadequate plans of urban development; Imprisoning of children, convicted because of the provocation, made by state special services
- Goals: Resignation of Putin, Dmitry Medvedev, and his government; Allowing Navalny to participate in 2018 presidential elections (until March 2018); Unblocking of Telegram messenger (since April 2018); Cancellation of the raising of the retirement age (since June 2018); In Yekaterinburg: Yevgeny Roizman (mayor of Yekaterinburg) to participate in 2017 Sverdlovsk Oblast governor elections (until May 2018); Return direct elections of the mayor in Yekaterinburg; In Moscow: Stop demolition of Moscow apartments (since April 2017); Close the garbage landfills around the Moscow; In Kemerovo: Resignation of Governor of Kemerovo region Aman Tuleyev (since March 2018); In Vladivostok: Discarding of election results in several eastern regions (since September 2018); In Saint Petersburg: Revision of inadequate plans of urban development; Justify and release children from the prison, convicted because of the provocation, made by state special services
- Methods: Demonstration, internet activism
- Result: Seven all-national rallies has taken place, (Note: They have taken place on 26 March, 29 April, 12 June, 7 October, and 5 November 2017, and on 28 January and 5 May 2018.) covering more than 100 cities; Navalny has been arrested three times on charges of violating the rules of organization of the rally – firstly for 15 days, then for 25 days, then for 20 days; Chairman of the Federation Council has proposed to forbid for kids to participate in protest rallies; Governor of Kemerovo Aman Tuleyev resigned; Retirement age raising reduced from 63 to 60 for women; Repressive laws easing that allows some politically convicted activists to avoid imprisoning; Charges against Ivan Golunov dropped

Parties
| (Russia) Russian opposition: Progress Party; People's Freedom Party; Solidarnost; Anti-Corruption Foundation; Libertarian Party; Open Russia; Artpodgotovka; Party of Changes; Truck drivers, student activists, Moscow homeowners, and population of Moscow region, Saint Petersburg, Yekaterinburg, and Kemerovo, among others | Government of Russia; Ministry of Internal Affairs; Police; National Guard; National Guard Forces Command; OMON; SOBR; Cossacks; United Russia; Counter-protestors: National Liberation Movement; Volunteers |

Lead figures
| Alexei Navalny; Leonid Volkov; Ilya Yashin; Yevgeny Roizman; Mikhail Svetov; Sergey Boyko; Mikhail Kasyanov; Vladimir Ryzhkov; Vyacheslav Maltsev; Dmitry Gudkov; Ksenia Sobchak; Andrei Bazhutin | Vladimir Putin (Russia) Dmitry Medvedev (Russia) Yevgeny Prigozhin (Russia) Aman Tuleev (Russia) Sergey Sobyanin |

Number
| Moscow: 15,000–25,000+ Saint Petersburg: 6,000–10,000+ Novosibirsk: 2,000–5,000+ Yekaterinburg: 1,000–5,000; Across Russia: 150,000 (according to the FBK) | Unknown |

Casualties
- Deaths: 0
- Injuries: 2 police officers and 1 national guard trooper
- Arrested: 26 March 2017: 1,030–2,000+ 29 April 2017: 200; 12 June 2017: 1,769; 7 October 2017: 136–290; 5 November 2017: 448; 28 January 2018: 266–371; 5 May 2018: 1,600+

The 2017–2018 Russian protests were a long series of countrywide street protest actions and demonstrations in the Russian Federation, which were primarily concerned with suppressing corruption in the Russian government (from 26 March 2017 through spring 2018) and abandoning the planned increase of retirement age (from 14 June 2018 through the end of 2018).

The anti-corruption protests began in March 2017 but were joined by and overlapped the 2018 Russian pension protests. The anti-corruption protests were primarily led by Alexei Navalny, who was joined by well-known participants such as the Libertarian Party, Open Russia, and Artpodgotovka. They occurred as a result of the 2014–2016 Russian financial crisis aftermath, although they had their root in the corruption at the different levels up to the highest echelons of the Russian power.

The protests and demonstrations against corruption in the Russian government began in March 2017 after the release of the investigative film He Is Not Dimon to You by Navalny's Anti-Corruption Foundation, which had garnered more than 23 million views on YouTube. Discontentment was triggered by the alleged corrupt activity of Prime Minister Dmitry Medvedev as presented in the film, the inadequately planned demolition of apartments in Moscow and the protracted strikes of truck drivers related to the Platon toll system, which had been ongoing since 2015.

National protests against corruption in Russia took place simultaneously in more than 100 cities across the country on 26 March 2017. By Sunday evening, riot police in body armor and helmets had detained more than 1000 demonstrators in central Moscow, as the crowd, numbering in the tens of thousands, cheered, whistled and chanted "Shame!", "Medvedev, resign!", and "Putin is a thief!" The Levada Centre survey showed that 38% of surveyed Russians supported the protests and that 67% held Putin "entirely" or "to a large extent" responsible for high-level corruption.

A new wave of mass protests occurred on 12 June 2017. After the arrest of Navalny on 29 September, hours before a planned rally in Nizhny Novgorod, a new wave of protests was announced for 7 October, the birthday of Putin. Protests and uprisings continued in 2018, with the tendency to radicalization, and a record number of protesters was detained on 5 May, two days before Putin's inauguration. Mass rallies were held in more than 60 cities across Russia.

== Background ==
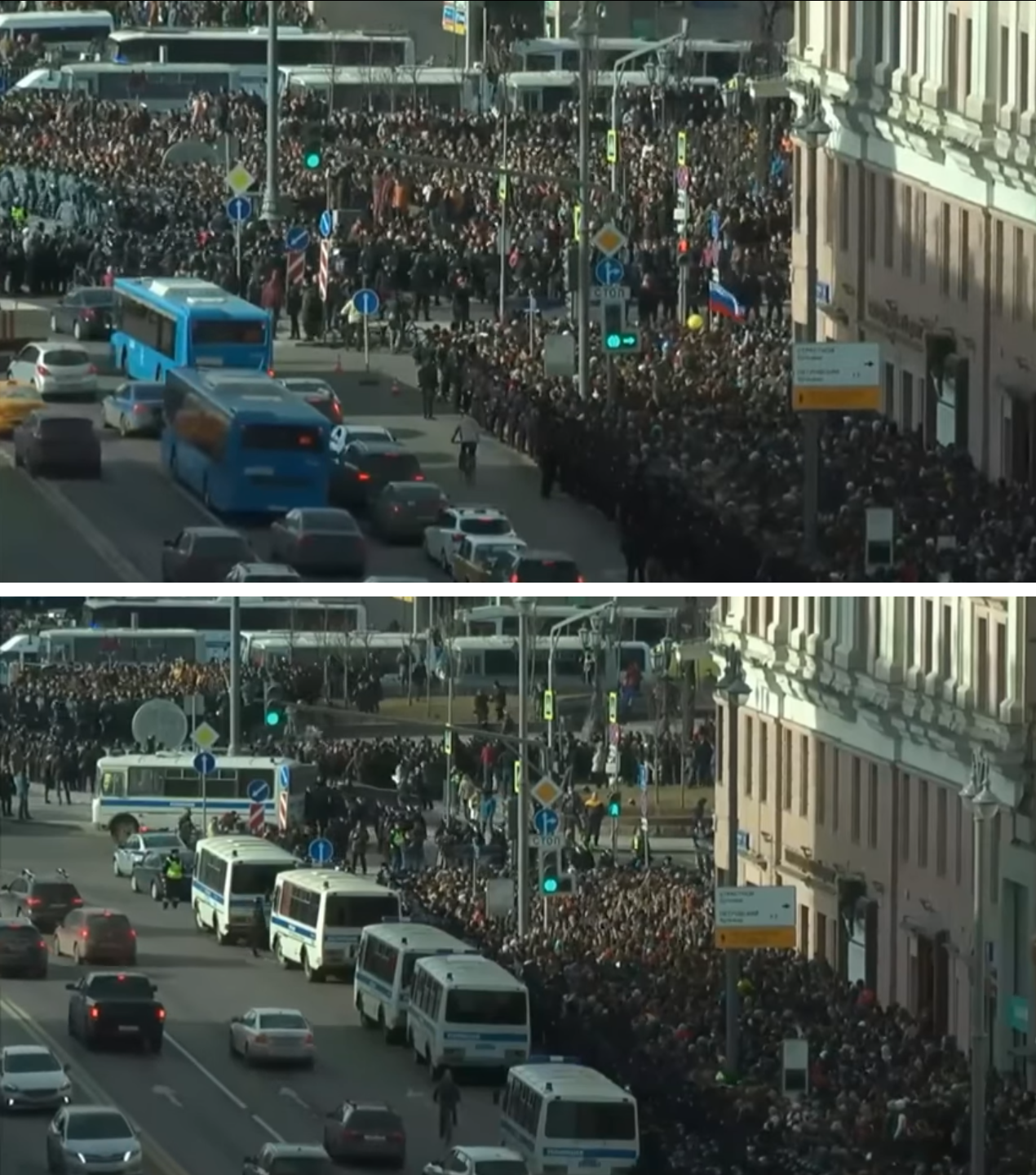
Protests in Moscow

In March 2017, Alexei Navalny and his Anti-Corruption Foundation launched the campaign He Is Not Dimon To You, accusing Dmitry Medvedev, the prime minister and former president of Russia, of corruption. The authorities both ignored the report produced by Navalny and commented that the report was issued by a "convicted criminal" and was not worth commenting on.

On 26 March, Navalny organized a series of anti-corruption rallies in different cities across Russia. This appeal was responded to by the representatives of 95 of Russian cities, and four cities abroad: London, Prague, Basel and Bonn. In some cities, the rallies were sanctioned by the authorities, but in others, including Saint Petersburg, they were prohibited. Moscow authorities declined the event request by Navalny in the city centre, but did not suggest any alternative location. Navalny referred to a decision of the Constitutional court and declared the event for being permitted.

The Moscow police said that 500 people had been detained, but according to the human rights group OVD-Info, 1,030 people were detained in Moscow alone, including Navalny himself.

The Main Department of the Ministry of Internal Affairs posted a message on its official website with a call to Moscow residents not to join the event. It said that the action in Moscow was not coordinated with the municipality and was illegal.

== Events ==
=== 26 March 2017 ===
Protesters in Yekaterinburg chant The one not jumping is Dimon

On 26 March, an estimated 60,000 people took part in anti-corruption protests across 80 Russian towns and cities and hundreds of protesters were detained, including opposition leader Alexei Navalny and employees of the Anti-Corruption Foundation.

According to Human Rights Watch, Russian authorities have harassed, intimidated, or threatened to expel schoolchildren and university students who participated in anti-corruption demonstrations on 26 March. 70 children were arrested in Moscow alone.

The United States Department of State condemned the detention of protesters, including Alexei Navalny, stating that "detaining peaceful protesters, human rights observers, and journalists is an affront to core democratic values."

==== Number of protesters ====
| City | Sanctioned | Peak attendees | Ref. |
|---|---|---|---|
| Moscow | Disputable | 7,000–30,000 | |
| Saint Petersburg | No | 3,000–10,000 | |
| Yekaterinburg | No | 1,000–5,000 | |
| Novosibirsk | Yes | 1,500–4,000 | |
| Nizhny Novgorod | No | 400-3,000 | |
| Perm | Yes | 520-3,000 | |
| Saratov | Unavailable | 400-3,000 | |
| Omsk | Unavailable | 1,000–2,000+ | |
| Samara | No | 600-2,000+ | |
| Voronezh | Yes | 300-2,000 | |
| Chelyabinsk | No | 1,000–2,000 | |
| Kazan | Yes | 700-1,500 | |
| Krasnoyarsk | Unavailable | 450-1,500 | |
| Tomsk | Yes | 400-1,500 | |
| Ufa | Yes | 250-1,500 | |
| Vladivostok | No | 180-1,500 | |
| Izhevsk | Yes | 500-1,200 | |
| Rostov-on-Don | Unavailable | 250-1,000+ | |
| Irkutsk | Yes | 300-1,000 | |
| Khabarovsk | No | 90-1,000 | |
| Krasnodar | Unavailable | 300-1,000 | |
| Smolensk | Unavailable | 1,000 | |
| Tolyatti | No | 200-1,500 | |
| Tyumen | Yes | 300-1,000 | |
| Ivanovo | Unavailable | 400–850 | |
| Volgograd | Unavailable | 250–800 | |
| Cheboksary | Unavailable | 500 | |
| Cherepovets | Unavailable | 500 | |
| Kaliningrad | Unavailable | 200–500 | |
| Magnitogorsk | No | 500 | |
| Vladimir | Unavailable | 500 | |
| Vologda | Unavailable | 500 | |
| Barnaul | Unavailable | 300–500 | |
| Komsomolsk-on-Amur | No | 300-500 | |
| Tver | No | 400+ | |
| Arkhangelsk | Unavailable | 350–400 | |
| Penza | Unavailable | 300–400 | |
| Petrozavodsk | Unavailable | 300–400 | |
| Tula | Unavailable | 250–400 | |
| Ryazan | Unavailable | 350+ | |
| Belgorod | Unavailable | 300+ | |
| Astrakhan | Unavailable | 300 | |
| Kaluga | Unavailable | 300 | |
| Kirov | Unavailable | 300 | |
| Kurgan | No | 300 | |
| Lipetsk | Unavailable | 300 | |
| Syktyvkar | Unavailable | 300 | |
| Ulyanovsk | No | 300 | |
| Nizhny Tagil | Unavailable | 200–300 | |
| Sochi | Unavailable | 200–300 | |
| Yaroslavl | Unavailable | 200–300 | |
| Bryansk | Unavailable | 120–300 | |
| Oryol | Unavailable | 100–300 | |
| Kemerovo | Unavailable | 150–250 | |
| Orenburg | Unavailable | 200+ | |
| Kostroma | Unavailable | 200+ | |
| Naberezhnye Chelny | Unavailable | 200 | |
| Volzhsky | Unavailable | 200 | |
| Stavropol | Unavailable | 150–200 | |
| Tambov | No | 150-200 | |
| Yuzhno-Sakhalinsk | Unavailable | 150–200 | |
| Murmansk | Yes | 110–200 | |
| Novokuznetsk | Unavailable | 100–200 | |
| Ukhta | Unavailable | 70–200 | |
| Nizhnevartovsk | Unavailable | 150 | |
| Balashikha | Unavailable | 100–150 | |
| Chita | Unavailable | 100–150 | |
| Kursk | Unavailable | 100–150 | |
| Makhachkala | No | 100-150 | |
| Biysk | Unavailable | 100 | |
| Pskov | Unavailable | 100 | |
| Sergiyev Posad | Unavailable | 100 | |
| Yoshkar-Ola | Unavailable | 70 | |
| Obninsk | Unavailable | 50–70 | |
| Saransk | No | 50-70 | |
| Yakutsk | Unavailable | 60 | |
| Armavir | No | 50 | |
| Blagoveshchensk | No | 50 | |
| Sarapul | Unavailable | 50 | |
| Veliky Novgorod | Unavailable | 50 | |
| Minusinsk | Unavailable | 45 | |
| Berdsk | Unavailable | 40 | |
| Iskitim | Unavailable | 40 | |
| Stary Oskol | Unavailable | 35–40 | |
| Neftekamsk | Unavailable | 30 | |
| Lysva | Unavailable | 27 | |
| Orsk | Unavailable | 25 | |
| Gatchina | Unavailable | 20 | |
| Almetyevsk | Unavailable | 15 | |
| Simferopol | No | 10-12 | |
| Sevastopol | No | 3 | |

=== 29 April 2017 ===
Action organized by the Open Russia civic movement led by Mikhail Khodorkovsky took place in dozens of cities all across Russia. Action was called "Fed up with" ("Nadoel" in Russian) with the aim to urge for changes in Russian political rule. Protestors called for Putin and government to resign. In Saint Petersburg, Tyumen, Kemerovo, Tula and several other cities rallies were suppressed by police, with a total of 200 people being detained countrywide. As a consequence, the Open Russia organization was labeled as "undesirable" by Russia's prosecutor general, so that it was officially banned from operating in the country and its website was blocked by official Media Authorities Roscomnadzor

=== 12 June 2017 ===
A new wave of protests with the same goals was announced by Navalny on spring. They took place in even more cities. They occurred in 154 towns and cities. According to Reuters and rights groups, tens of thousands of protesters attended and more than one thousand were detained. A Moscow court sentenced Navalny to 30 days in prison for calling people to the protest.

White House spokesman Sean Spicer condemned the arrest of protesters and called for their release. Russian authorities rejected US petitions and criticised the widening on the sanctions against Russia.

=== 7 October 2017 ===
Protest actions against corruption in the highest echelons of the Russian government were held on 7 October 2017, on the day of the 65th anniversary of V.V. Putin in the form of rallies, processions and single pickets in 79 cities of Russia. At the rallies came from 2560 to 21,520 people, like the supporters of Alexei Navalny, and his opponents. The main rallies were rallies in St. Petersburg and Moscow. In Saint Petersburg, the action began on the Field of Mars, and in Moscow on Tverskaya Street. The reason for their conduct were facts of corruption V.V. Putin and his associates. More than 260 participants of the action were detained.

=== 5 November 2017 ===
In Moscow, many police were present, the Okhotny Ryad station was closed. The police conducted selective searches of citizens, many were taken away in padded wagons. At 13:00 on the message OVD-Info in Moscow, 82 people were detained. 2 people were detained in Saint Petersburg, 4 in Krasnoyarsk. Also detained a representative of the "Echo of Moscow". Later in Saint Petersburg, another 10 people were detained near the Smolny Institute.

At 21:00 on the message OVD-Info, the number of detainees increased to 448 people. Most of the detentions took place in Moscow – 339, in Saint Petersburg 21 people, according to unconfirmed reports, 49 of them – minors. It remains to spend the night in the police departments, on the night of 6 November, about 112 people.

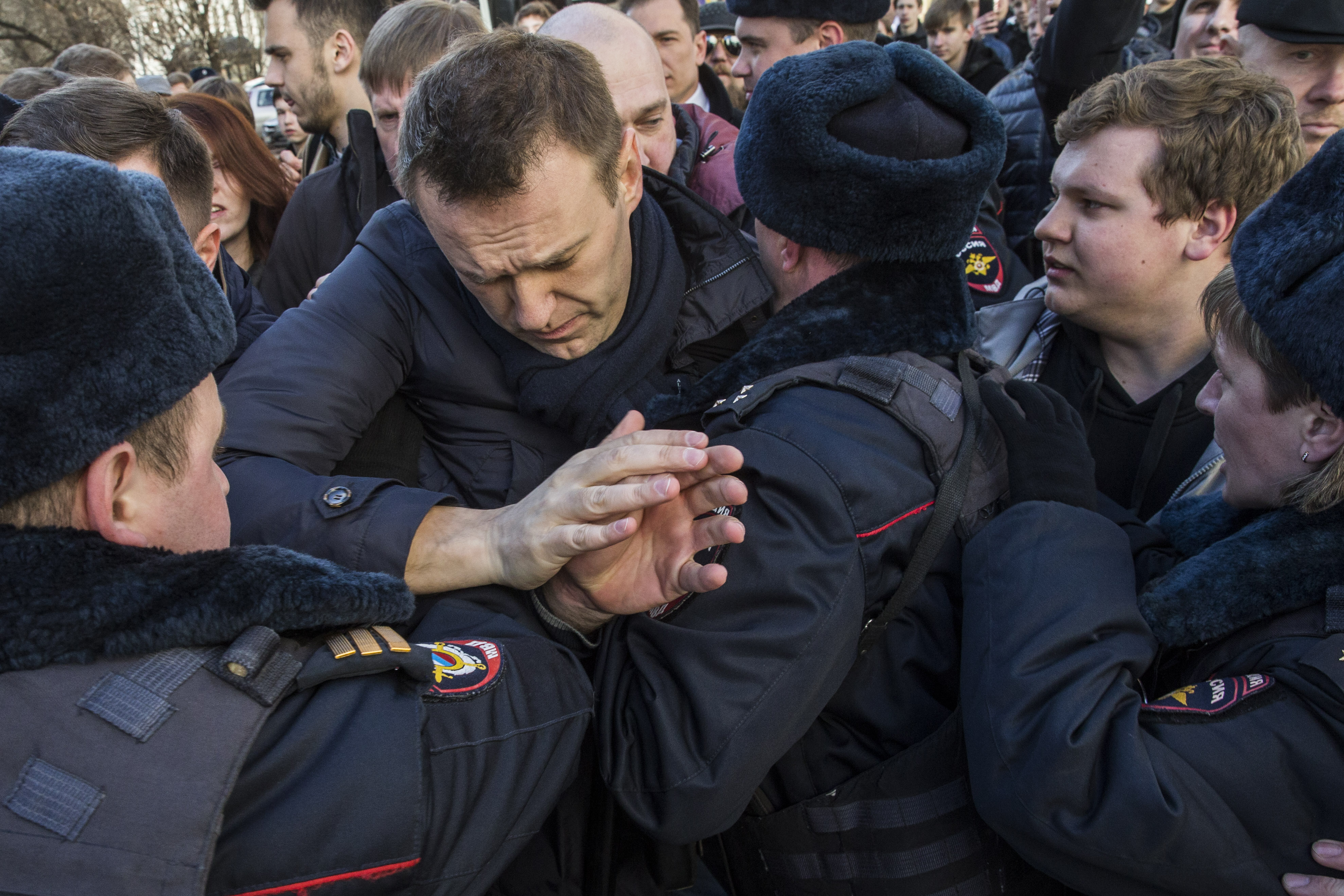
Navalny arrested during the protests on 26 March 2017

=== 28 January 2018 ===
Protests within the framework of the "Strike of voters" were held on 28 January 2018 in the form of rallies, processions and solitary pickets in 118 cities of Russia. The reason was the refusal of the CEC to register at the election of Alexei Navalny, after which he announced a protest on 28 January, and urged all his supporters not to come to the elections and agitate others not to take part in them. The Ministry of Internal Affairs estimated the number of participants in the shares of 3500–4500 people, the HROs – in 5000. According to the supporters of Alexei Navalny, the participants were much more. The New Times, referring to eyewitnesses, reported 4,000–5,000 protesters in Moscow and 2,000–3,000 in Saint Petersburg. In Yekaterinburg, in an agreed action, Mayor Yevgeny Roizman and Navaly Head of Staff Leonid Volkov took part and spoke at the rally. The presidential candidate, Vladimir Zhirinovsky, spoke with several protestors on Tverskaya Street in Moscow. According to various estimates, about 15,000 people took part in the protests.

=== 30 April 2018 ===
Approximately 13,000 people gathered in Moscow central Sakharov square for a protest rally to urge government to unblock Telegram Messenger. The app was blocked by Roscomnadzor, Russian media authorities who claimed it was used to coordinate terror attacks. Protesters denounced the block as the censorship act and freedom of speech violation.

=== 5 May 2018 ===
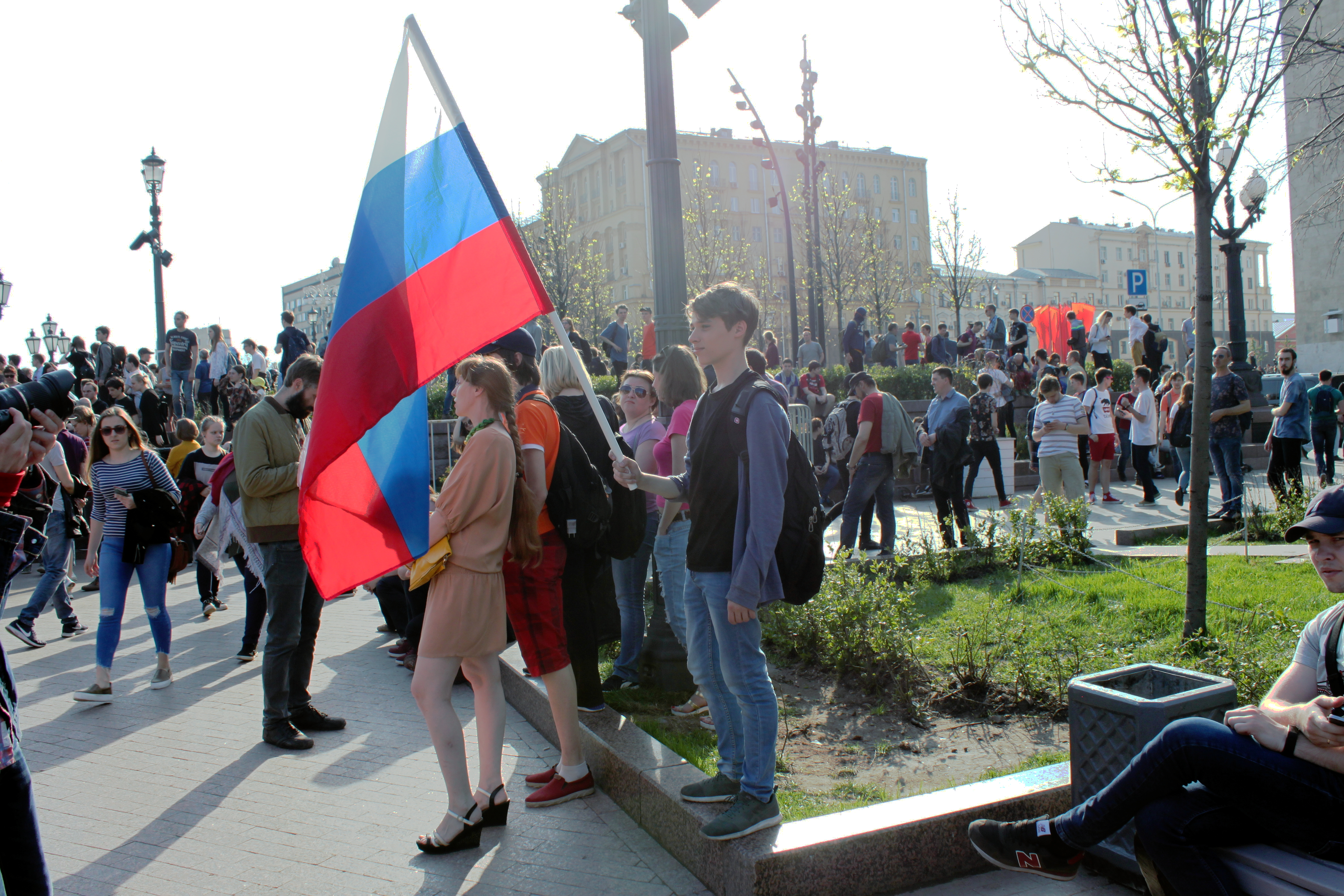
«He's not our tsar» rally in Moscow, 5 May 2018

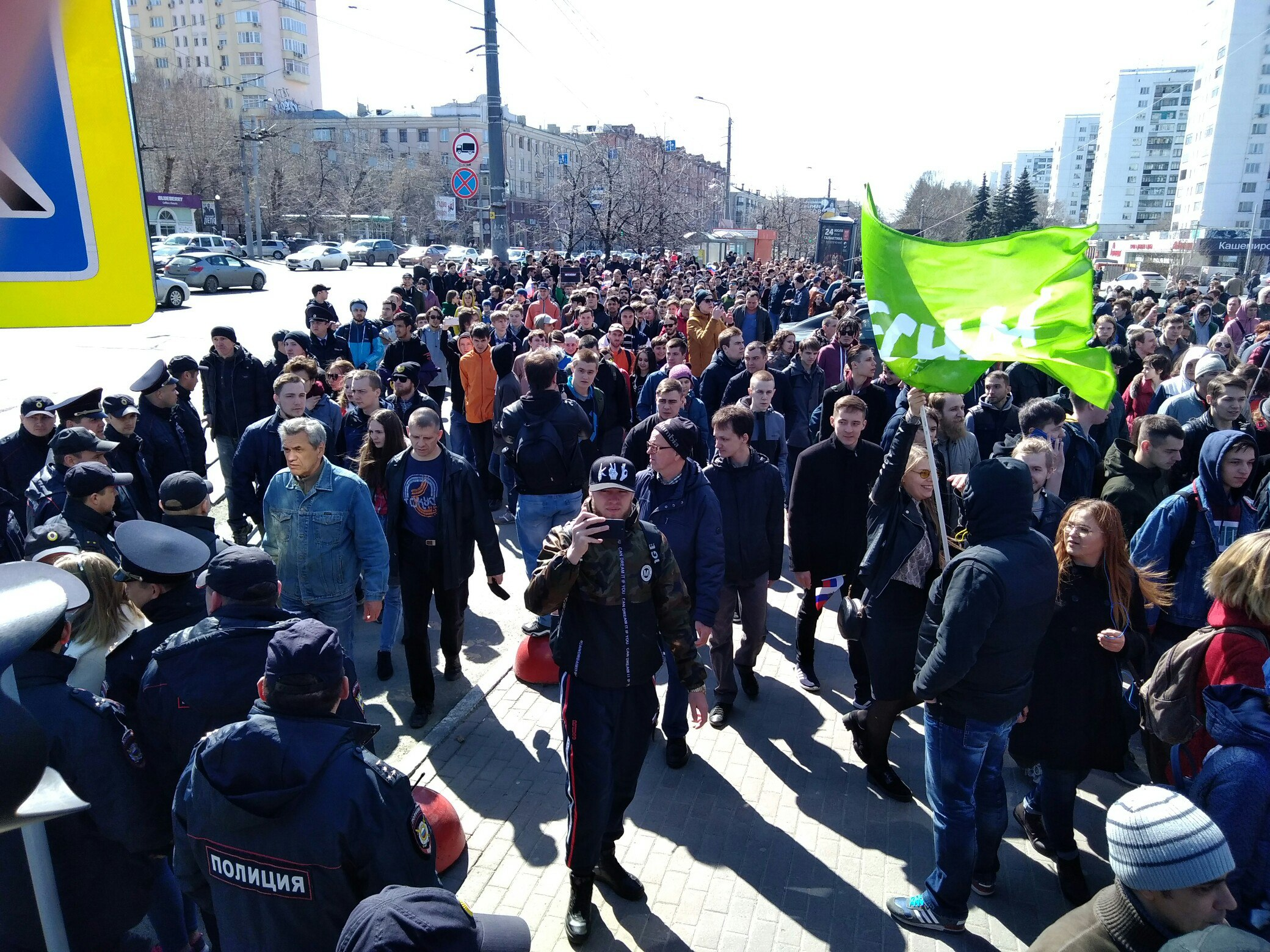
Rally In Chelyabinsk

Mass protest actions and rallies took place in 90 towns and cities over the country against Vladimir Putin fourth inauguration. Alexei Navalny in his blog compared Vladimir Putin with a tsar. More than thousand people were arrested countrywide. The majority of people were detained in Moscow, Saint-Petersburg, Chelyabinsk, Yakutsk, Krasnodar, Tolyatti, Krasnoyarsk, Voronezh, Astrakhan, Penza, Kaluga, Belgorod, Novokuznetsk, Vladimir and Samara.

=== July–September 2018 ===
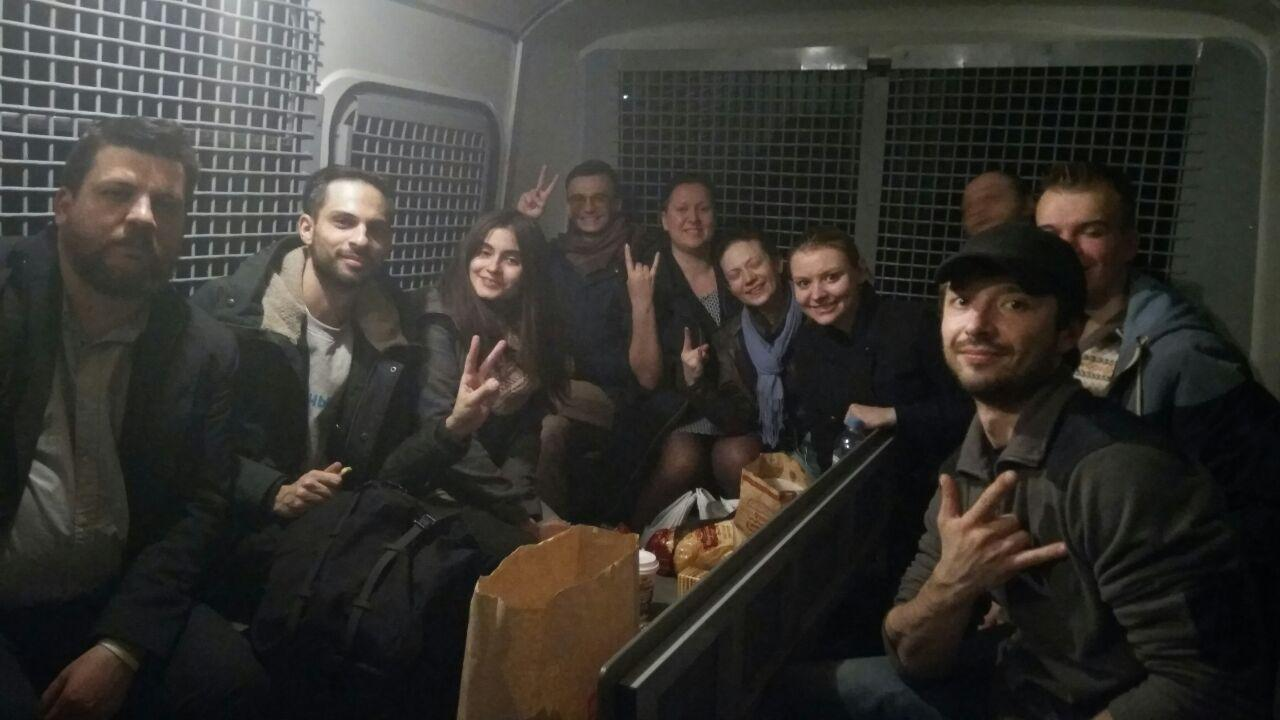
Volunteers and employees of Newcaster.TV and Anti-corruption Foundation arrested in Moscow

From July, almost every weekend, protest rallies and demonstrations were organized against the planned retirement age hike. Such events occurred in nearly all major cities countrywide including Novosibirsk, St.-Petersburg and Moscow. Total number of participants exceeded 200 thousands, with maximal single-event attendance of about 15 thousands (in Moscow). These events were coordinated by all opposition parties with the leading role of the communists. Also trade unions and some individual politicians (among whom Navalny) functioned as organizers of the public actions.

The most noticeable street rallies, related with the retirement-age reform, proceeded on 1 July, 18, 28 July-29 July, 2 September and 9 September 2018. So, on 2 September, large-scale anti-reform manifestations were led by the Russian communists and some other left-wing oppositional political forces. A week later, on 9 September, the rallies were organized by Alexei Navalny all over Russia, over 800 people were detained.

== Aftermath ==
The Anti-Corruption Foundation building was evacuated due to a bomb message, interrupting the webcast of the protest conducted from the office. Soon the staff of the Foundation were detained by police, who also began to conduct searches and seizure of equipment.

Some time later, Alexei Navalny was charged with organizing an unlawful meeting. An ACF employee and the head of the Moscow branch of the unregistered "Party of progress" Nikolay Lyaskin was detained for 25 days. Leonid Volkov, the head of Alexei Navalny's presidential campaign, was charged with extremism.

An April 2017 Levada poll found that 45% of surveyed Russians support the resignation of Russian Prime Minister Dmitry Medvedev, while 33% opposed. Newsweek reported that "An opinion poll by the Moscow-based Levada Center indicated that 38 percent of Russians supported the rallies and that 67 percent held Putin personally responsible for high-level corruption". A May 2017 Levada poll found that 58% of surveyed Russians supported the protests, while 23% said they disapprove.

In May, Yury Kuly was sentenced to 8 months in jail, and on 24 May Alexander Shpakov was sentenced for 1.5 years in jail, both for alleged violence against the police on the 26 March rally in Moscow.

== Protests across Russia ==
Protests, meeting and pickets have been erupted in 79-154 towns and cities. Some protests ended with mass arrests and clashes with police (such as Moscow, Saint-Petersburg, Chelyabinsk, Yekaterinburg).

In Moscow on 26 March 2017, an estimated 20,000 protesters gathered, with at least 500 arrested according to police, while the human rights group OVD-Info counted over 800 detained in Moscow alone. Seventeen employees of Navalny's Anti-Corruption Foundation were also arrested. The Moscow protest had an atmosphere described as a mix of anger and an outdoor party, with high school-age young people dancing and laughing at the long lines of police while chanting slogans including "You can't jail us all!" and "Shame!" On 12 June 2017, Navalny was arrested outside his Moscow home en route to the demonstration, half an hour before the protest was to begin, with his wife announcing the arrest on his Twitter account.

=== Chelyabinsk ===
On 5 May, an estimated 2,000 to 5,000 protests have taken to the streets, protesters clashed with police, which resulted in arrests of 164 to 200. There are no official figures.

== Government reaction ==
Russian state television completely ignored the protests on Sunday. Monday morning's bulletins were similarly blank. Pro-Kremlin newspapers also ignored the protests.

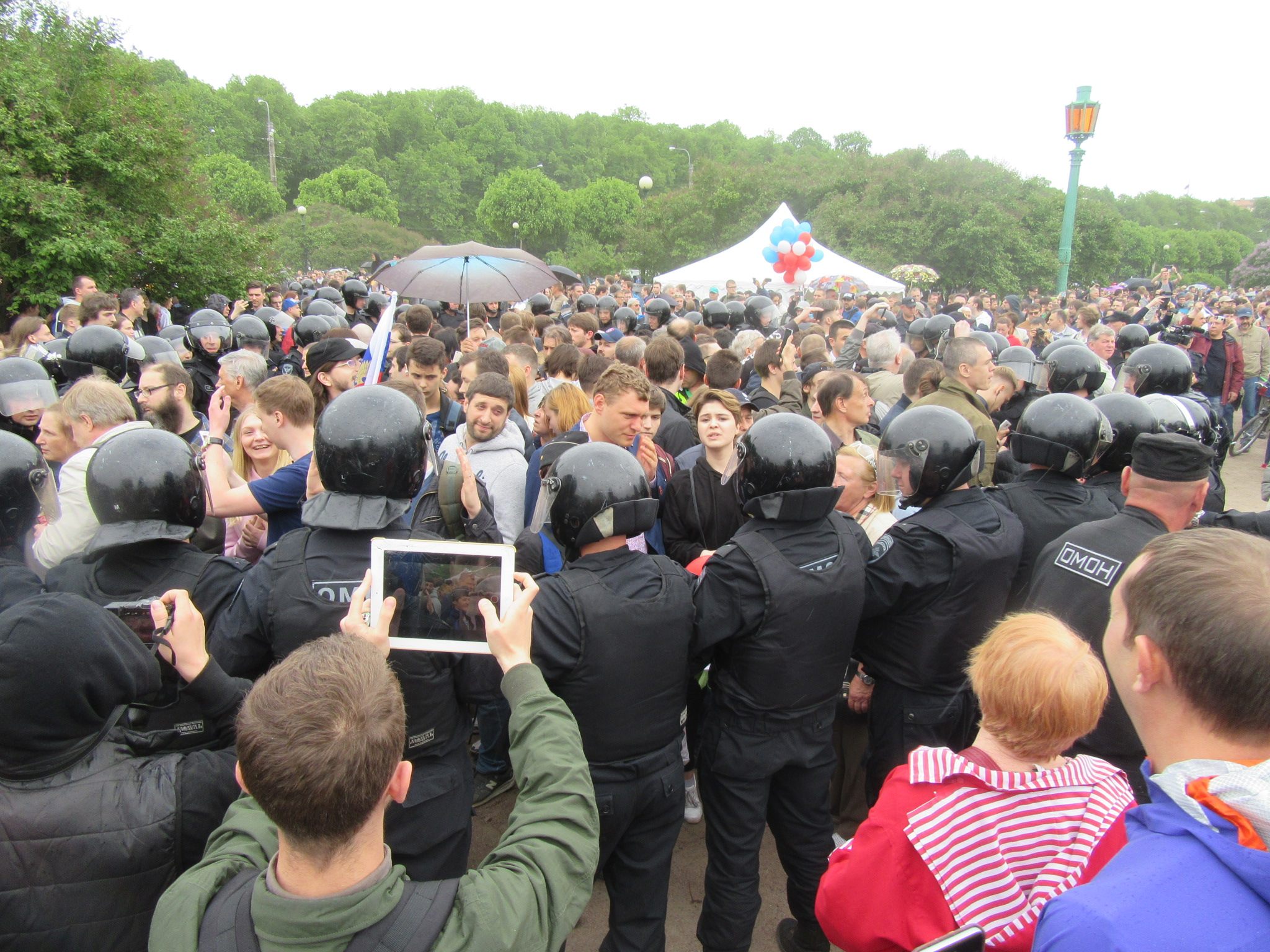
Police circles a group of protesters in Saint Petersburg, 12 June 2017

Across the country, students have reported being press-ganged into lectures warning them of the perils of supporting those opposed to Putin. Some schools and universities have simply tasked teachers with persuading their students not to go to protests. A 13-year old student was quoted as saying: "They don't have the right to 'reeducate' us, to change our political views. I think they're doing this because they're afraid. They know that one day we'll be able to vote."

Alisa Vox, a Russian singer, appeared in the video for "Baby Boy", posted online on 15 May. It has amassed more than 2.1 million views and more than a quarter of a million 'dislikes', or downvotes.

Navalny said Vox's video was a Russian government PR stunt to dissuade his supporters that she had received money for.

In many cities, on the day of the protest, the public transport route was specially changed so that it was more difficult for people to get to the protest.

The protest actions on 12 June 7 October, 5 November 2017 and 28 January 2018 were not mentioned at all on state-owned TV channels and the media.

== Gallery ==
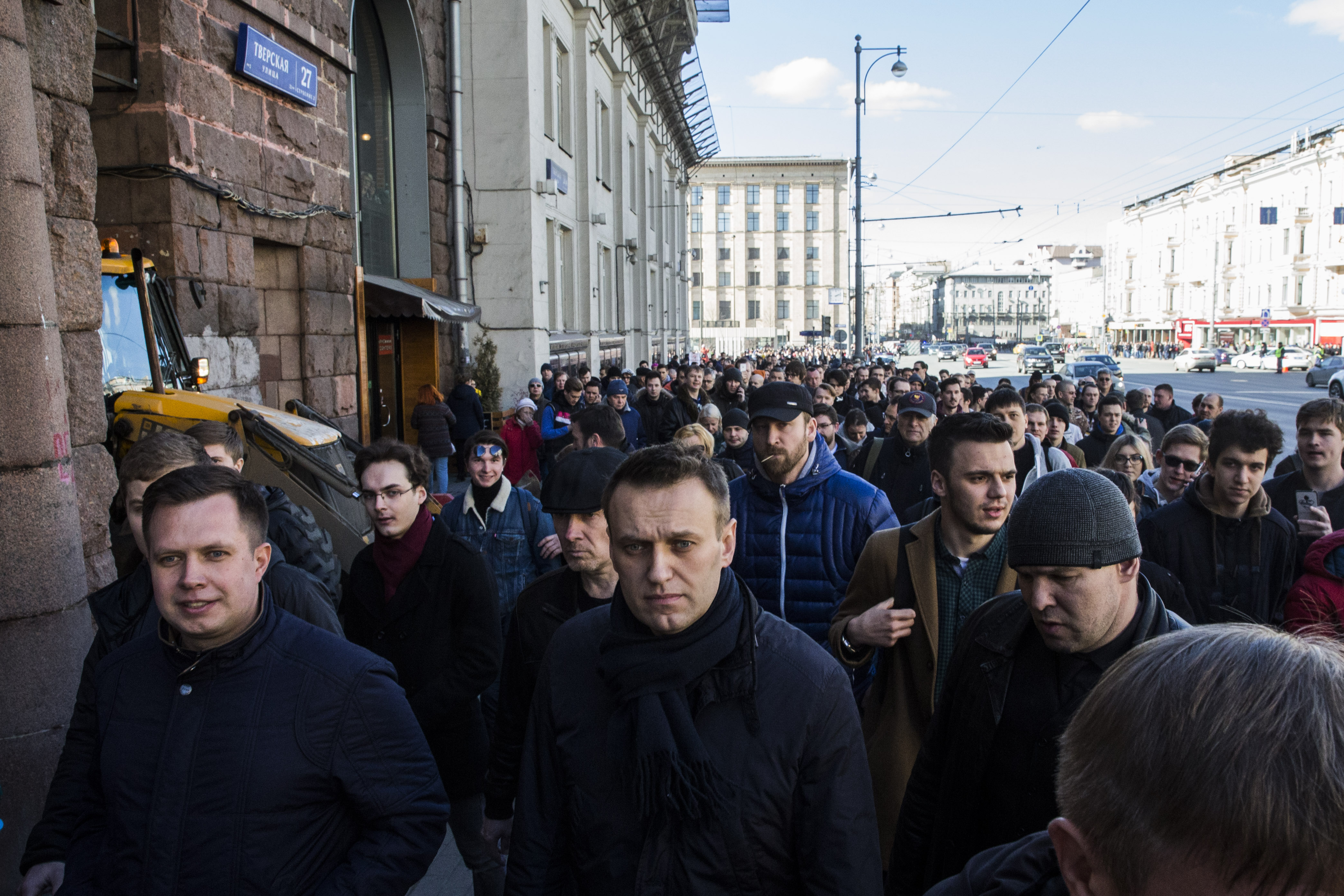
Navalny in Moscow,
26 March 2017

Field of Mars, St. Petersburg,
26 March 2017

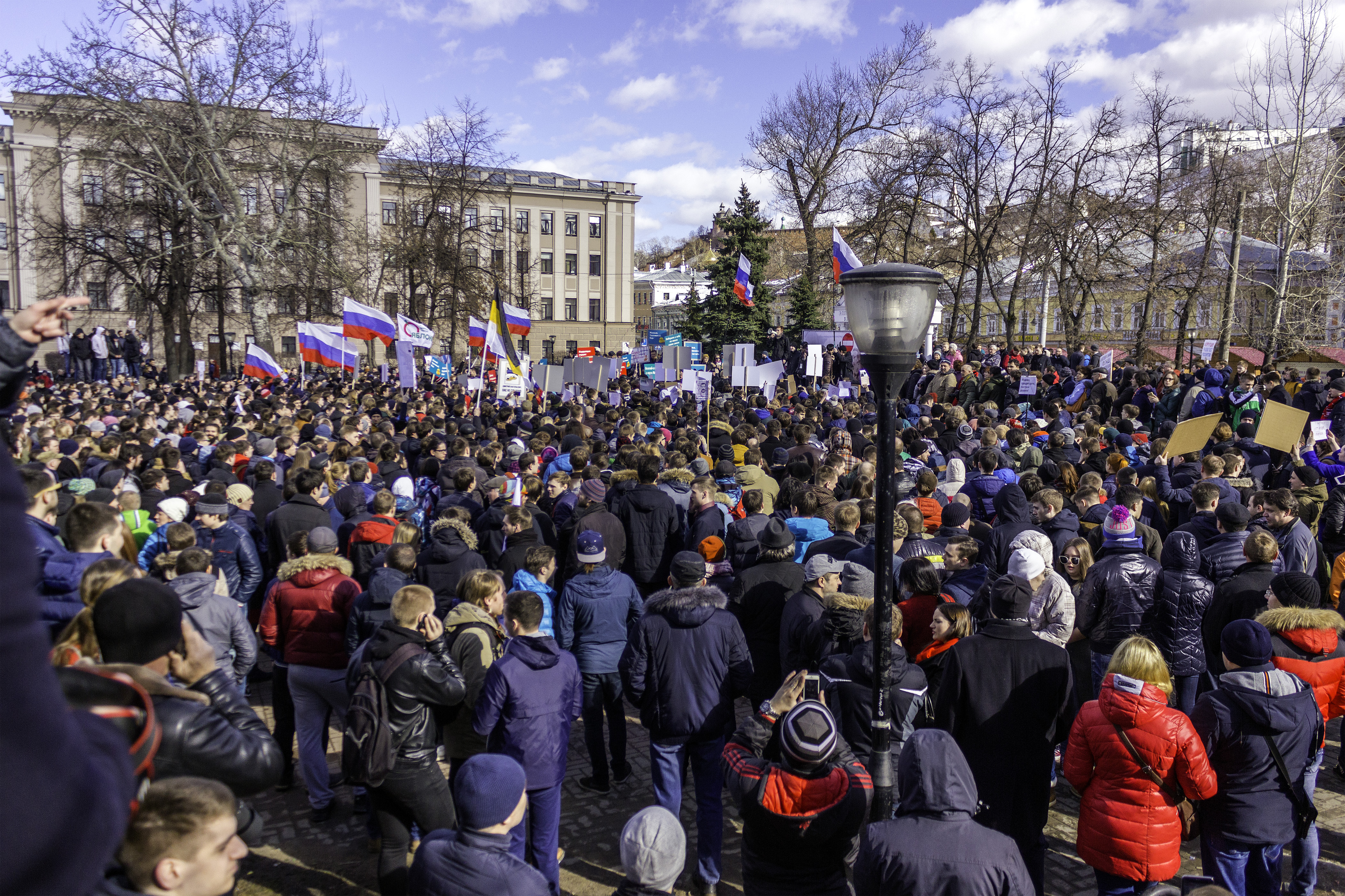
Markin Square, Nizhny Novgorod,
26 March 2017

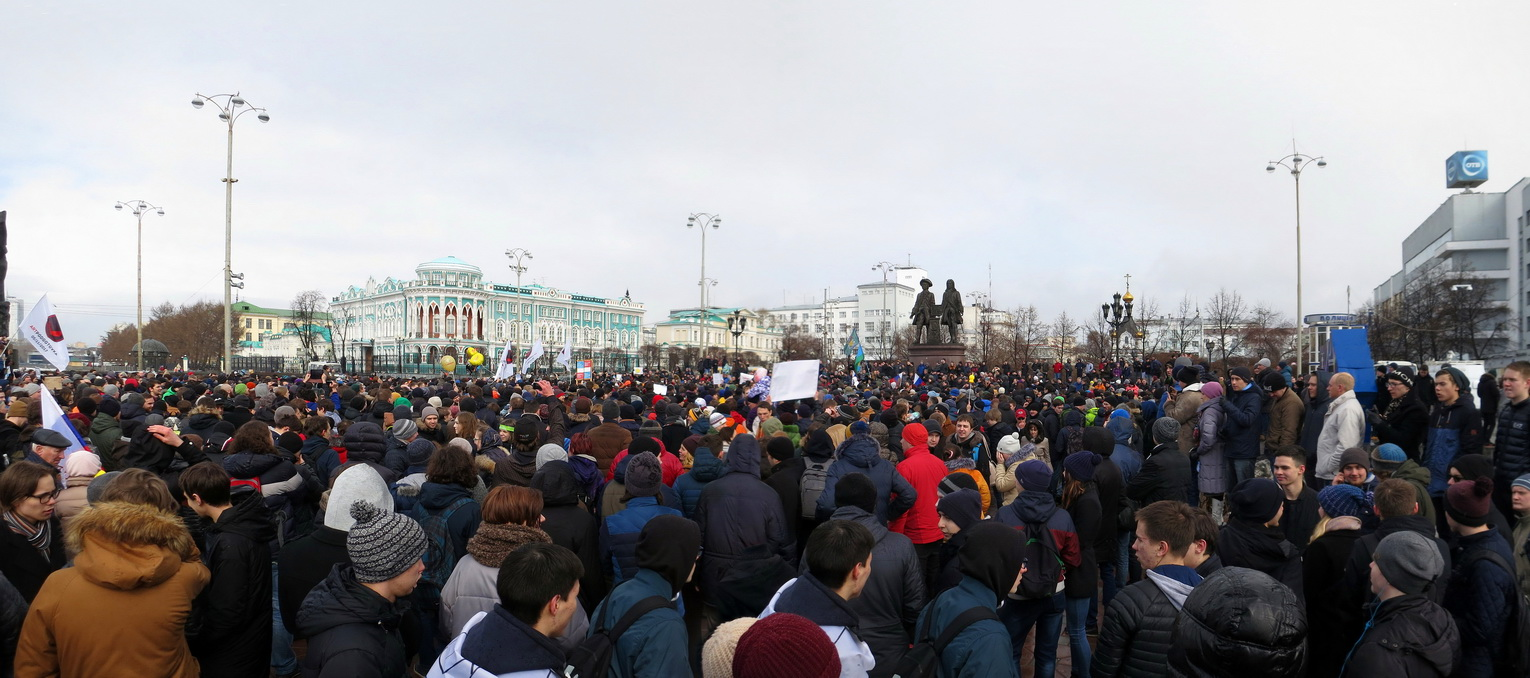
Yekaterinburg,
26 March 2017

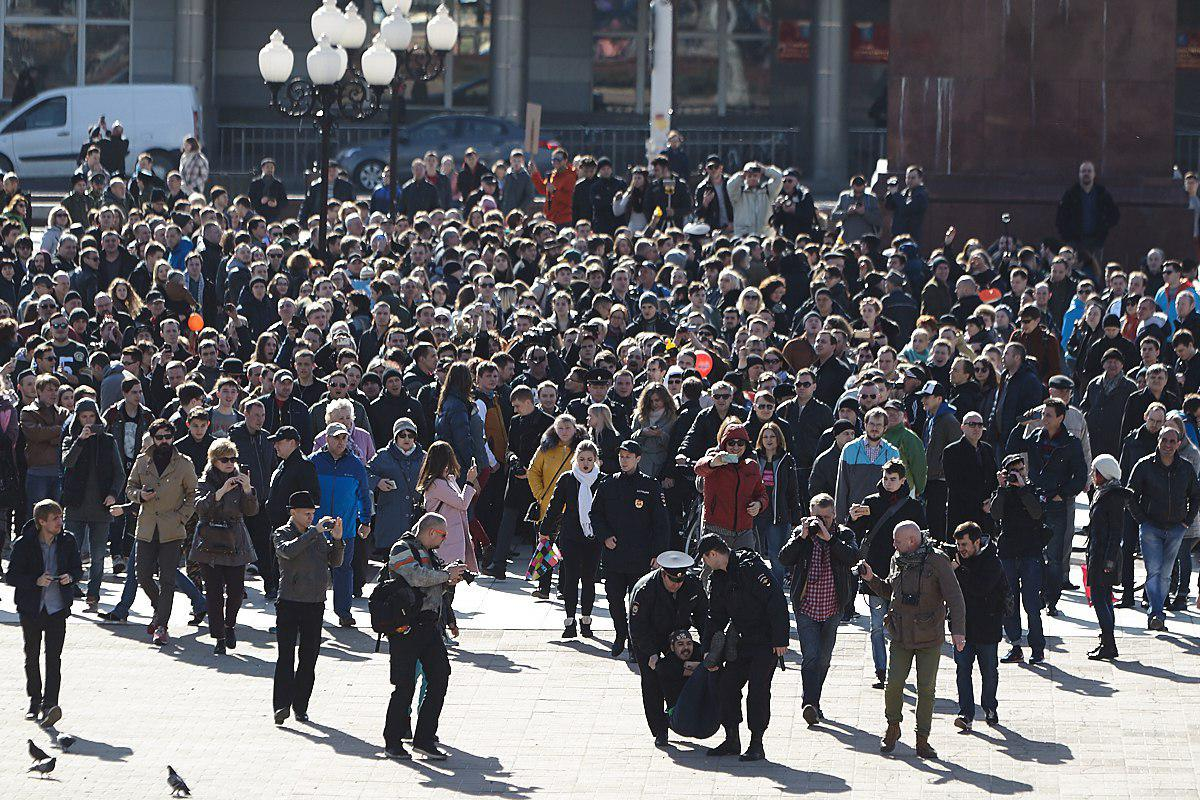
Kaliningrad,
26 March 2017

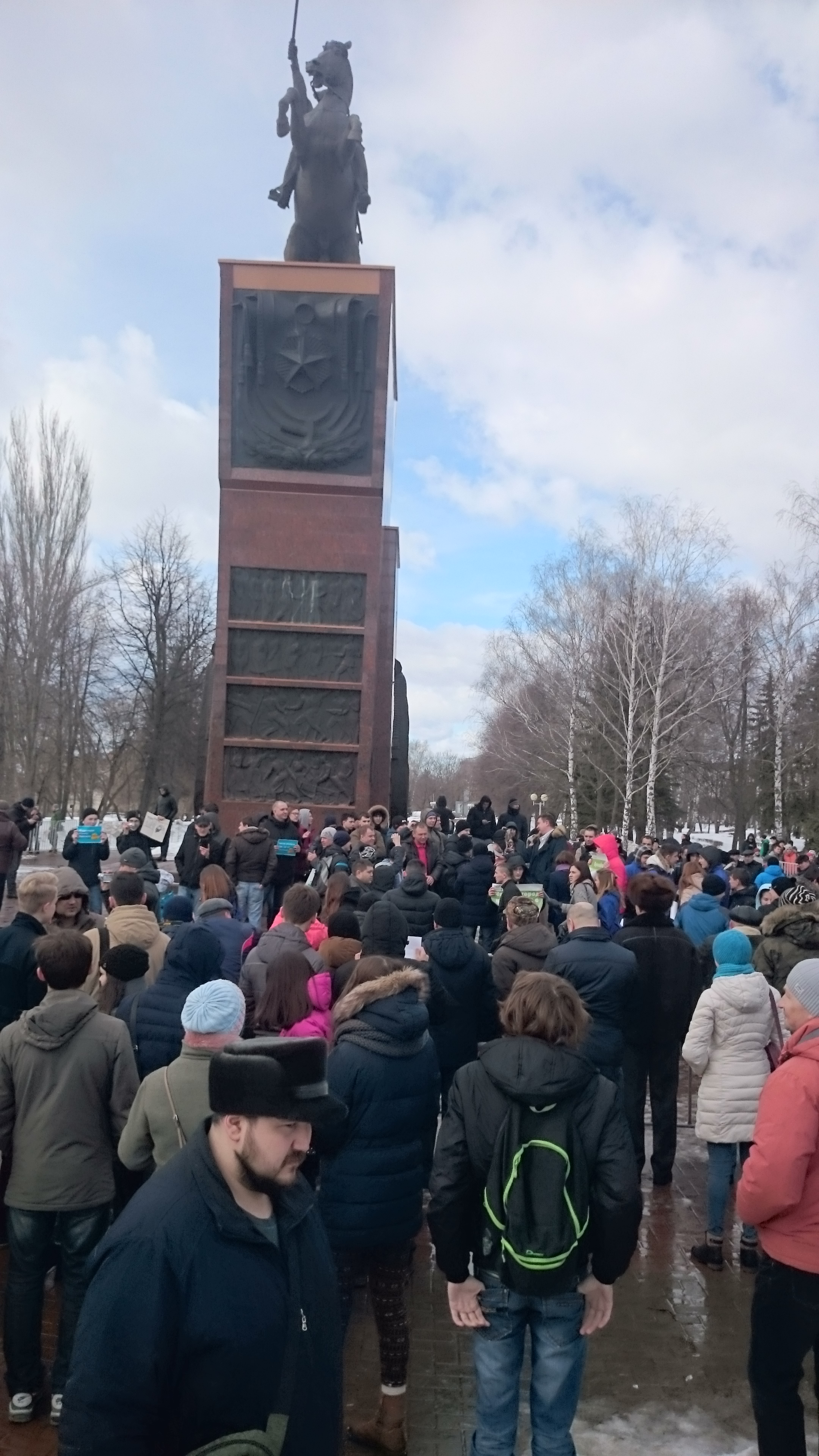
Cheboksary,
26 March 2017

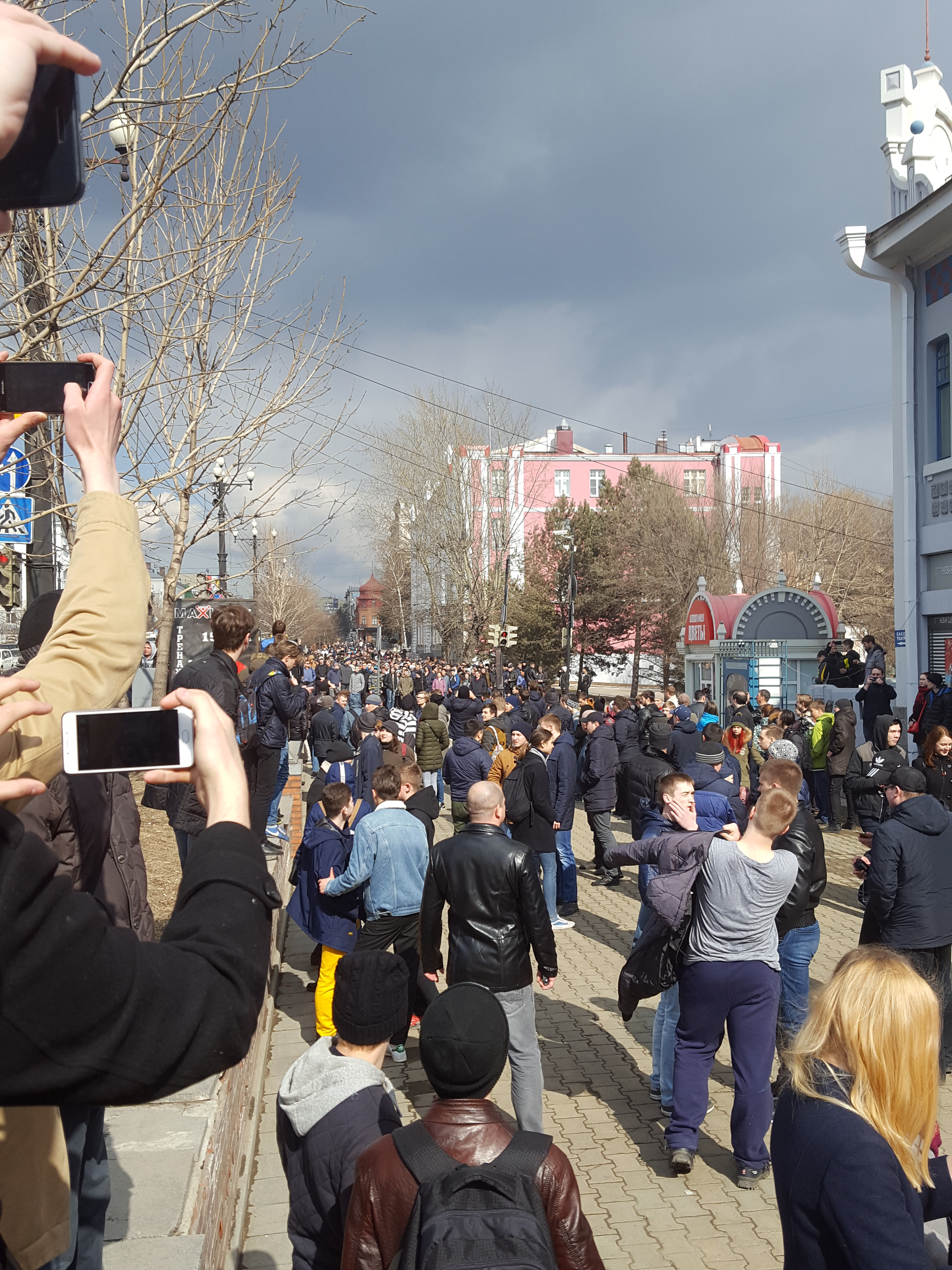
Khabarovsk,
26 March 2017

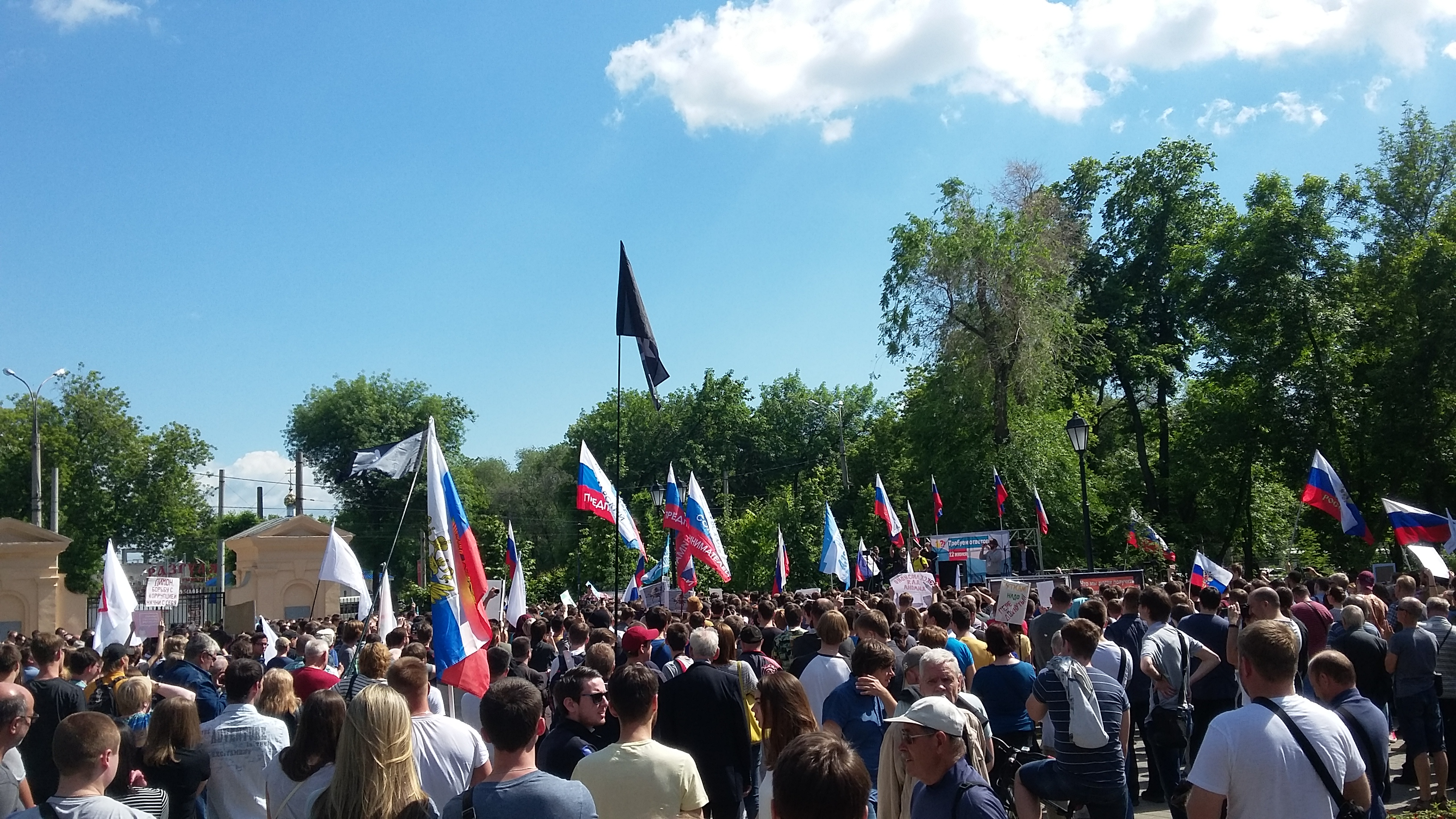
Samara,
12 June 2017

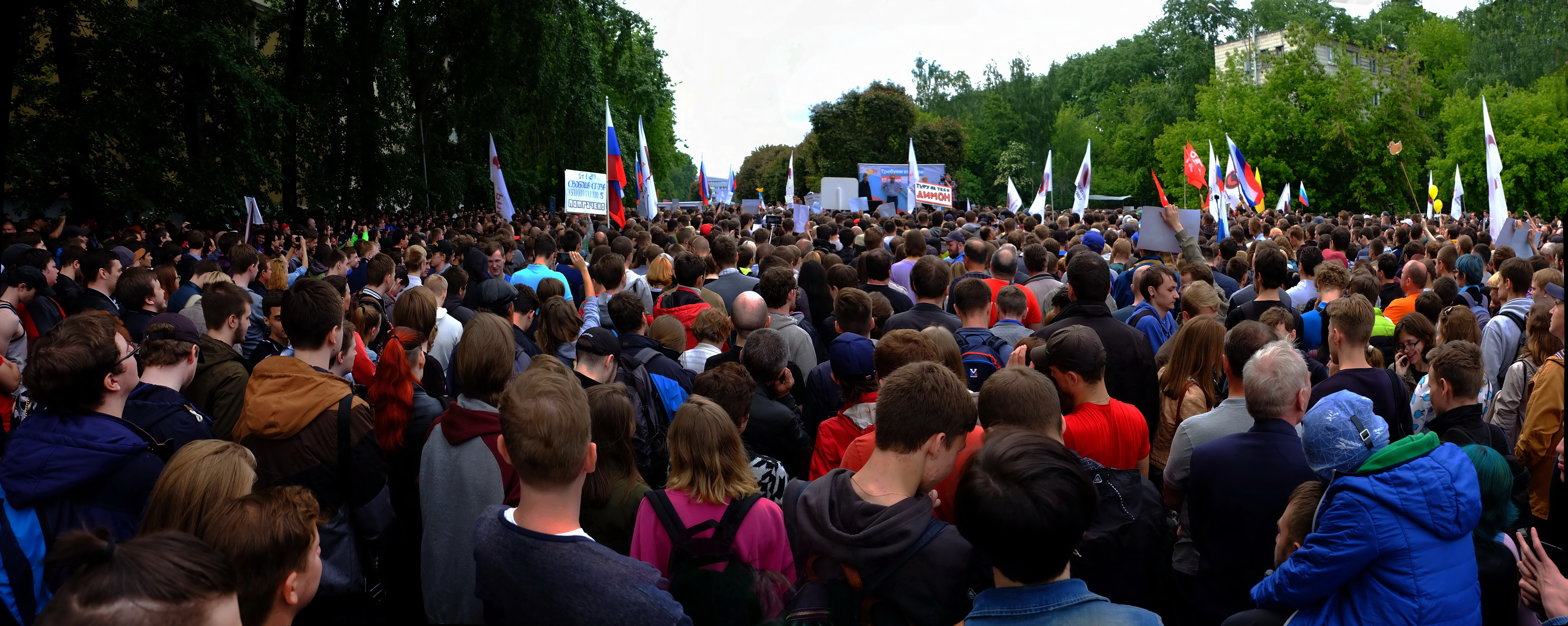
Yekaterinburg,
12 June 2017

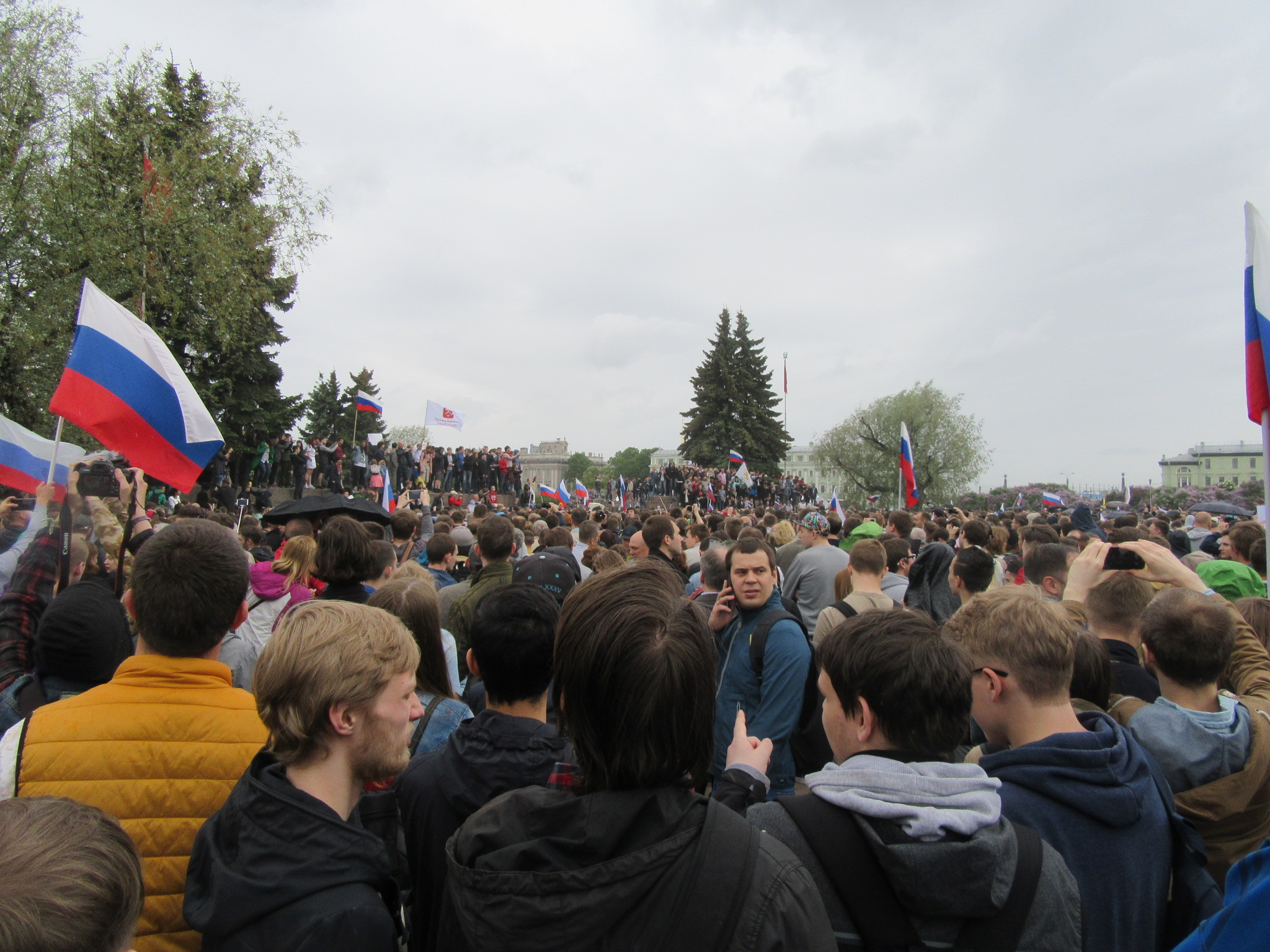
Saint Petersburg,
12 June 2017

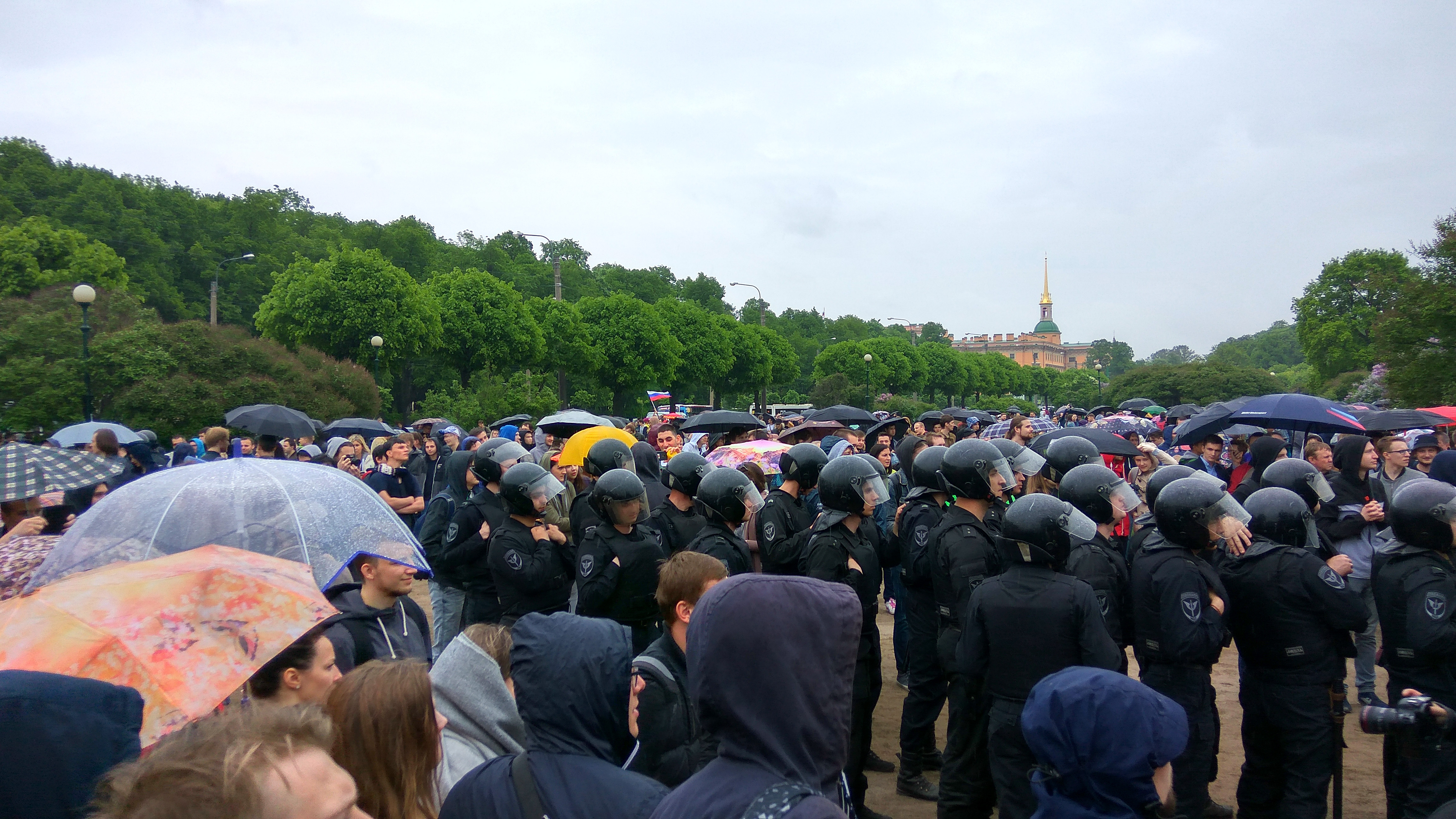
Field of Mars, OMON during the rally,
12 June 2017

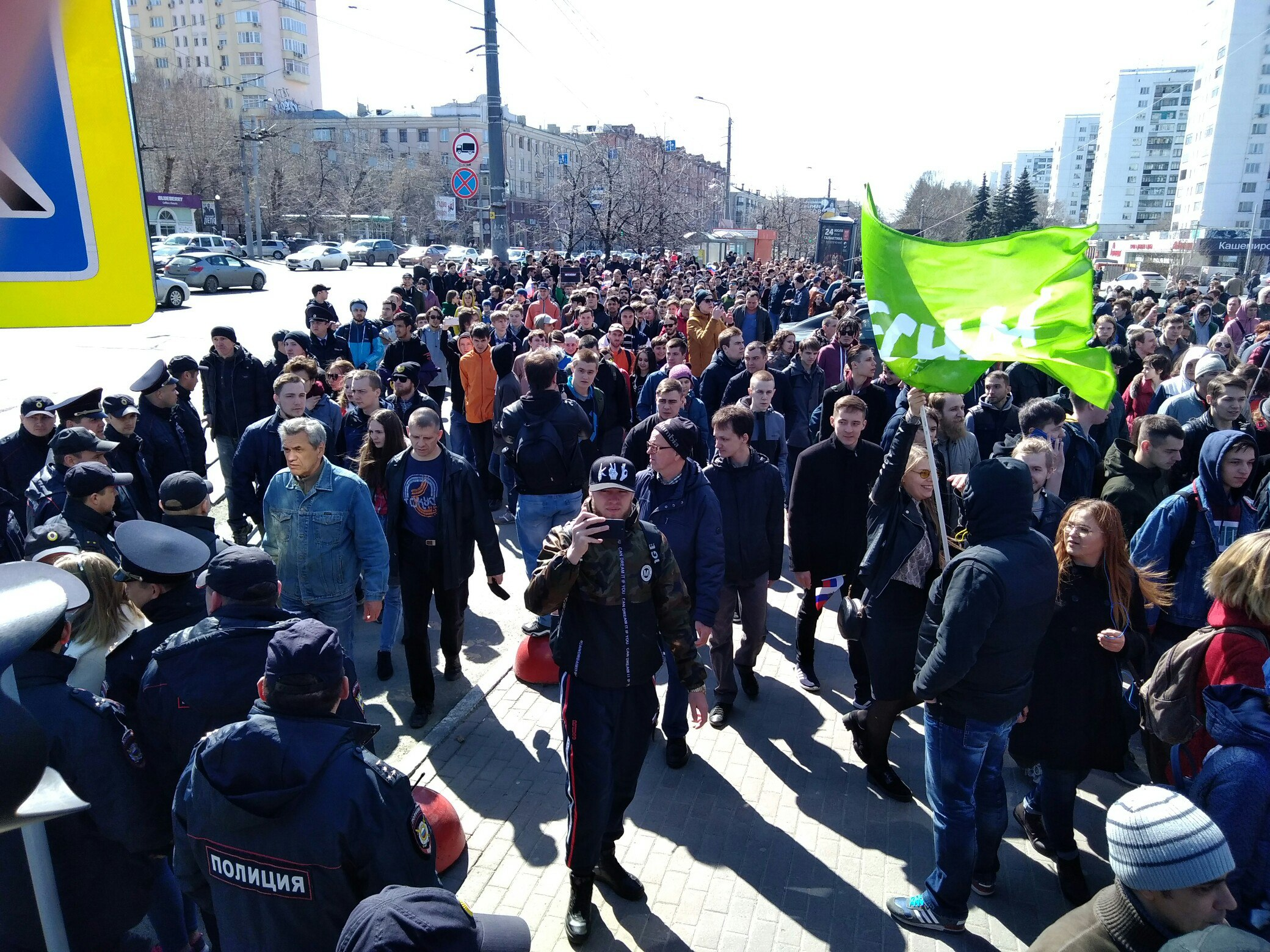
Rally in the city of Chelyabinsk, 5 May 2018

== See also ==
- Bibliography of Vladimir Putin
- Bibliography of Russian history (1991–present)
- 2011–13 Russian protests
- 2014 anti-war protests in Russia
- 2017 Belarusian protests
- 2018 Russian pension protests
- 2019 Moscow protests
- 2021 Russian protests
- List of protests in the 21st century

== Literature ==
- Badalyan K., Gavrov S. Leaders of public opinion: Political communication with youth in Russia during 2018-2019 // Russian journal of communication. Tom 9, № 2, London: Taylor & Francis, 2021. – РР. 238-252.
