= Daniel Kholodny =

Russian political prisoner

Daniel Kholodny was the technical director of Alexei Navalny's YouTube channel Navalny Live and is now a prisoner in Russia.

Kholodny became involved in Navalny's Anti-Corruption Foundation while studying in college. Eventually he became the technical director of the foundation's YouTube channel and was responsible for organising live broadcasts and filming videos about the foundation's investigations. According to his friends he was not involved in the organisation's finances.

Kholodny left the Anti-Corruption Foundation after the repression against it intensified and focused on his work at a small IT company which he founded while being a student.

Kholodny left Russia in June 2021 after Navalny's Anti-Corruption Foundation was declared an extremist organisation by the Russian court. He was arrested in February 2022 after returning to Russia. According to Navalny and Kholodny's friends, the prosecution offered him a release if he testified against his former associates. In August 2023 Kholodny was found guilty of founding an extremist organisation and sentenced to 9 years in prison.

Memorial human rights organisation considers Daniel Kholodny a political prisoner.
