= He Is Not Dimon to You =

2017 documentary film directed by Alexey Navalny

- Narrated by: Alexei Navalny
- Music by: "American Boy" by Kombinaciya
- Distributed by: Anti-Corruption Foundation
- Release date: 2 March 2017 (YouTube)
- Running time: 49.6 minutes
- Country: Russia
- Languages: Russian (with official Russian, English, French, Spanish, Polish and Finnish subtitles)

External videos
- "He Is Not Dimon to You" with English subtitles

He Is Not Dimon to You or Don't Call Him Dimon (Russian: Он вам не Димон, romanized: On vam ne Dimon) is a 2017 Russian documentary film detailing the corruption of Dmitry Medvedev, who was Prime Minister of Russia at the time of release. The film estimates that $1.2 billion was embezzled by Dmitry Medvedev.

== Title meaning ==
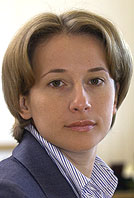
Natalya Aleksandrovna Timakova

The name of the film is a reference to an interview with Medvedev's press secretary Natalya Timakova, where she criticized the use of the nickname Dimon when speaking about Medvedev on social media. Dimon is a colloquial form of the name Dmitry, often used in gangster circles.

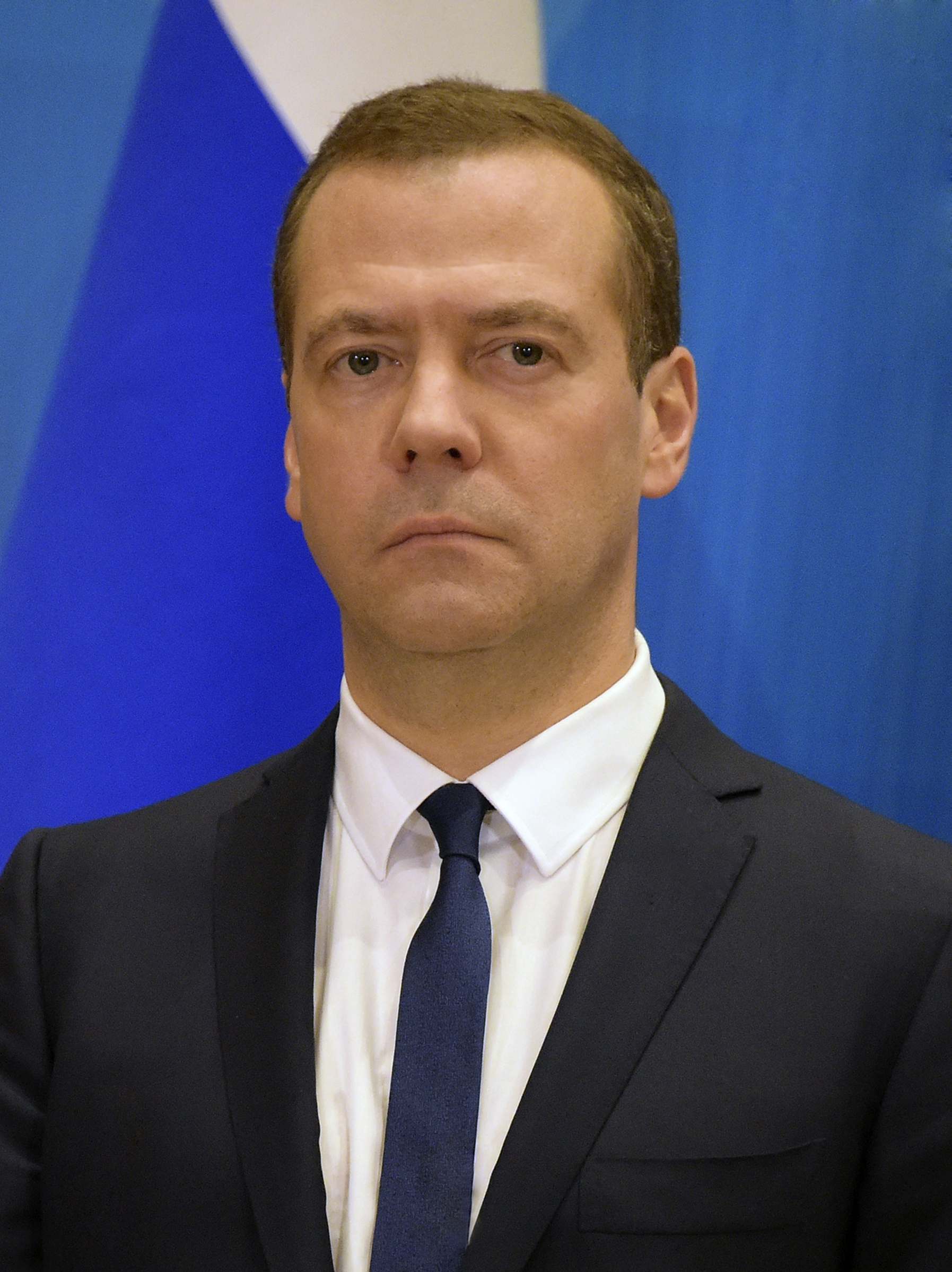
Dmitry Medvedev

== Contents ==
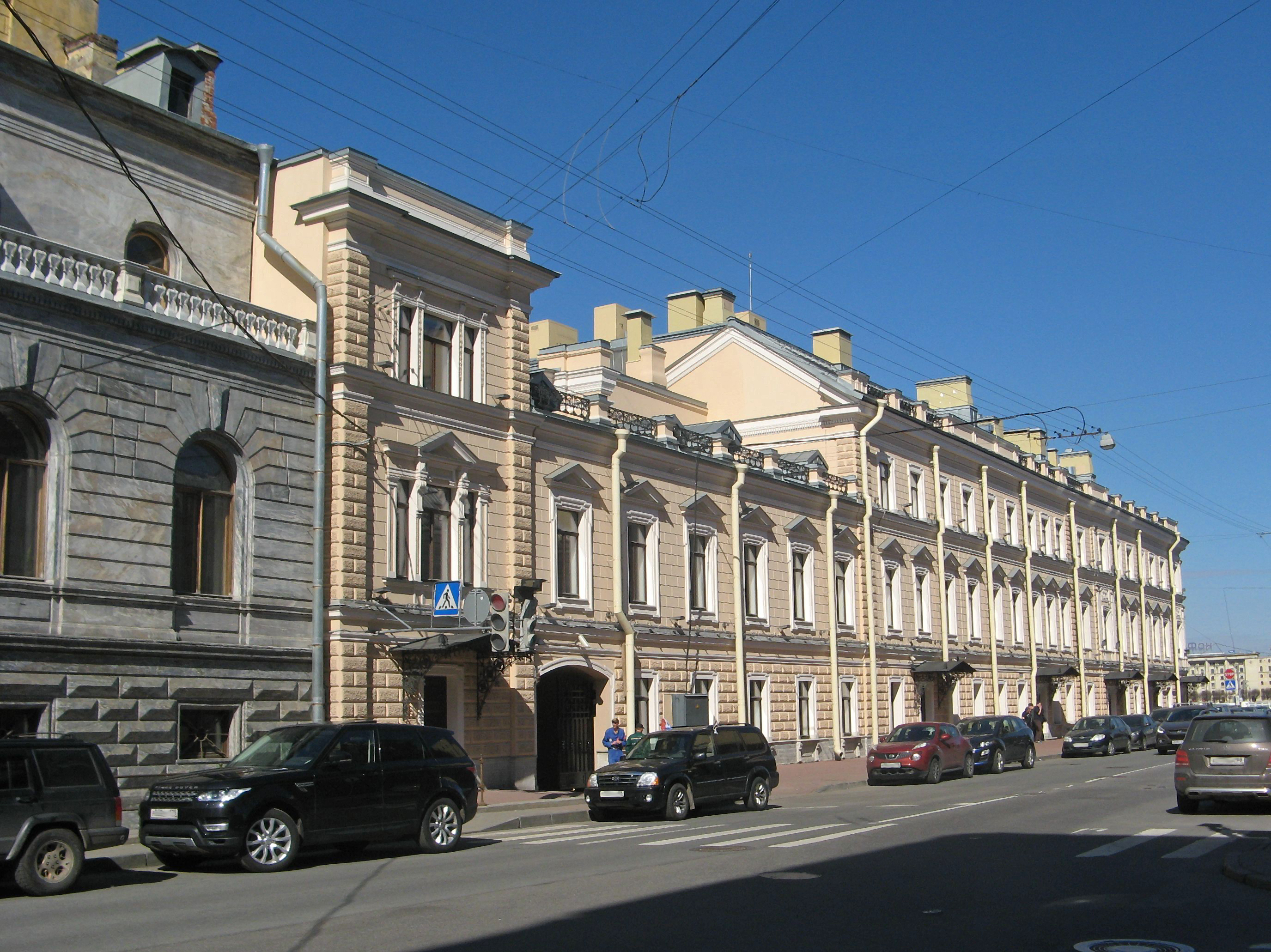
Kushelev-Bezborodko Mansion in Saint Petersburg, Gagarinskaya Street, 1 or Kutuzov Embankment, 24

The film is divided into 10 chapters:

- Chapter 1. About Medvedev's collection of expensive footwear, helping to identify his orders as being shipped to an address of a company controlled by Medvedev's college friend.
- Chapter 2. How oligarch Alisher Usmanov gave Medvedev a castle in the Moscow region as a present.
- Chapter 3. How Medvedev built a secret villa in the hills.
- Chapter 4. How Medvedev built a 'patrimonial estate' and agribusiness
- Chapter 5. How Medvedev became a winegrower and worked diligently to provide state support to the industry
- Chapter 6. How the DAR Foundation obtained apartments worth a billion
- Chapter 7. About the source of money for all that
- Chapter 8. About two yachts of Medvedev found in an offshore financial centre
- Chapter 9. How Medvedev got vineyards and a castle in Tuscany (Italy)
- Chapter 10. Moral and conclusions

All chapters are published on the FBK web page.

== Views ==
He Is Not Dimon to You was posted on the YouTube channel on 2 March 2017. The video received about 1.5 million views in its first day. A week after, this increased to 7 million, exceeding the result of Chaika, another film by Alexei Navalny and the Anti-Corruption Foundation. By May 2019, the video reached 30 million views.

== Reaction ==
Russian state-owned media and most of privately held media have completely ignored the controversial revelations. Initially there was no reaction from Dmitry Medvedev or other high-ranking Russian government officials. On March 10, Medvedev blocked Alexei Navalny on Instagram. Navalny led country-wide street protests on March 26, with a stated goal of forcing Putin and Medvedev to respond to Navalny's accusations. Following the end of March protest action, Medvedev claimed that the movie was shot specifically as an excuse for it, while accusations of corruption were 'made up on compote principle from weird stuff, nonsense and some pieces of paper'.

According to Stephen Sestanovich, Navalny "has forced the president of Russia to stop pretending that he is against corruption. Others may rail against it, but for Putin, corruption is now officially 'fake news.'"

An April 2017 Levada poll found that 45% of surveyed Russians support the resignation of Russian Prime Minister Dmitry Medvedev, while 33% of respondents were against. Newsweek reported that "An opinion poll by the Moscow-based Levada Center indicated that 67 percent held Putin personally responsible for high-level corruption".

== Defamation suit ==
On 31 May 2017, Navalny lost a defamation suit over the documentary, filed by Russian billionaire Alisher Usmanov. A judge at Moscow's Lyublinsky district court ordered Navalny to remove his YouTube video and to publish a retraction, which Navalny stated he will not do.

In a trial which lasted two days, the judge dismissed nearly all of the motions that Navalny had filed, including summoning Medvedev to testify. She did not allow any witnesses to appear in front of the court or review the documents that the investigation was based on. Navalny said that the verdict in Usmanov's favor should bring even more people to the streets at upcoming protests.

== See also ==
- 2017 Russian protests
- Putin's Palace
- Kleptocracy
