= Let them eat cake =

Quote traditionally attributed to Marie Antoinette

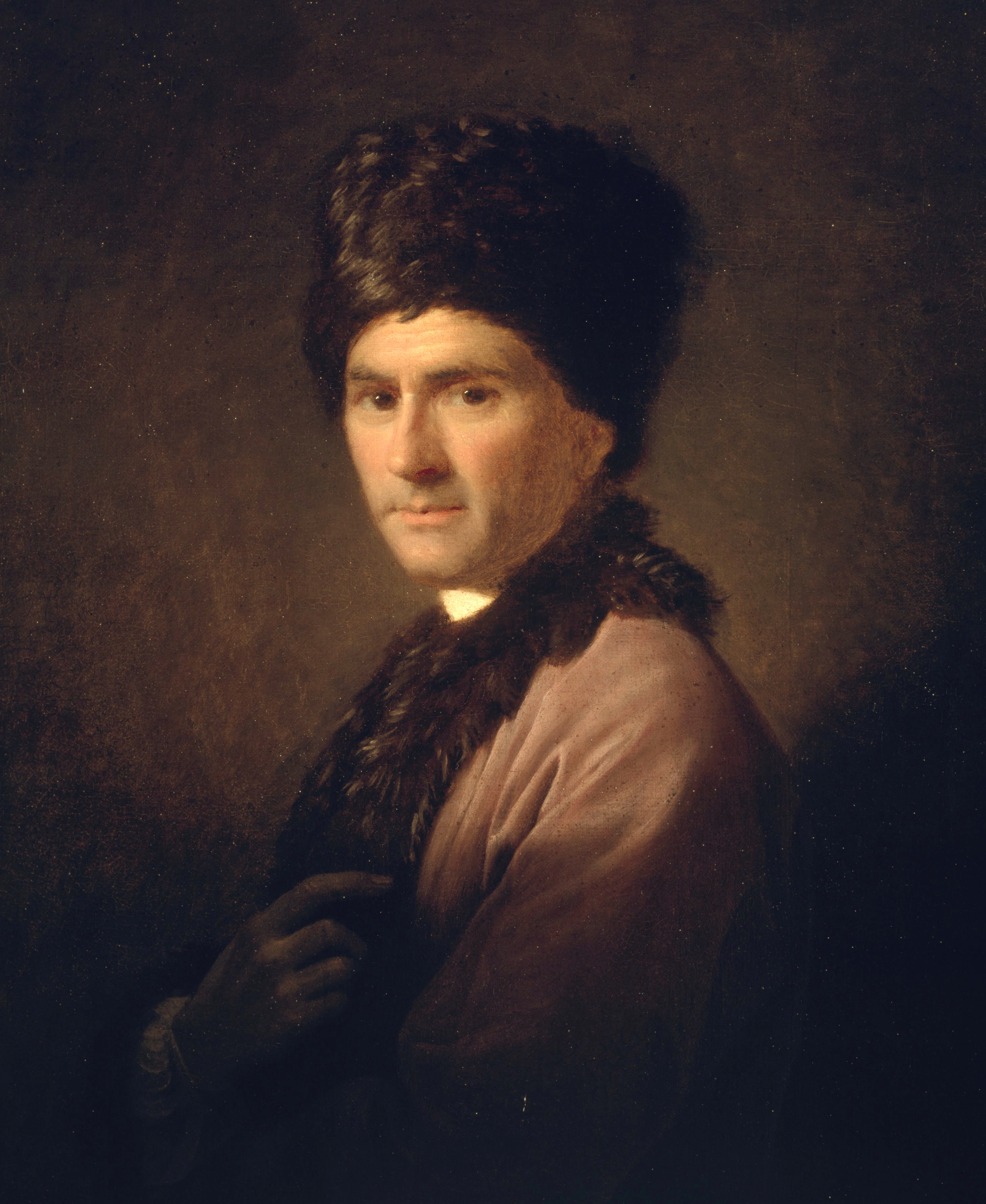
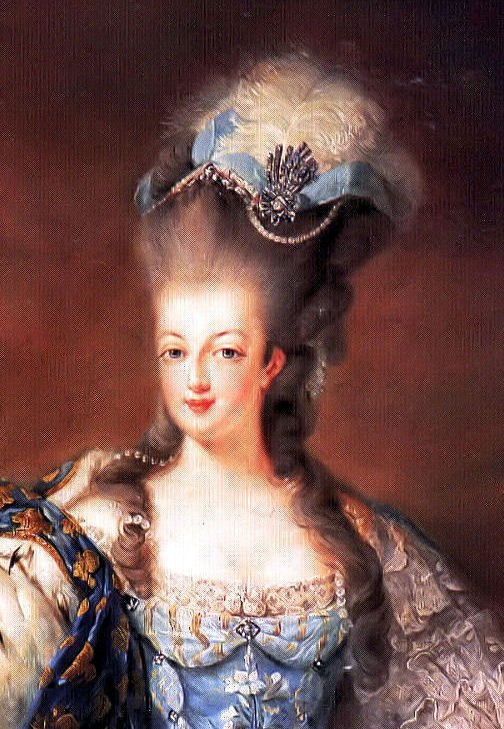
Jean-Jacques Rousseau (left) who coined the phrase "qu'ils mangent de la brioche" in 1765. In the years following the French Revolution, the quotation became attributed to Marie Antoinette (right), although there is no evidence that she said it.

"Let them eat cake" is the traditional translation of the French phrase "Qu'ils mangent de la brioche", said to have been spoken in the 18th century by "a great princess" upon being told that the peasants had no bread. The French phrase mentions brioche, a bread enriched with butter and eggs, considered a luxury food. The quote is taken to reflect either the princess's frivolous disregard for the starving peasants or her poor understanding of their plight.

Although the phrase is conventionally attributed to Marie Antoinette, there is no evidence that she ever uttered it, and it is now generally regarded as a journalistic cliché. The phrase can actually be traced back to Jean-Jacques Rousseau's Confessions in 1765, 24 years prior to the French Revolution, and when Antoinette was nine years old and had never been to France. The phrase was not attributed to Antoinette until decades after her death.

== Origins ==
The phrase appears in book six of Rousseau's autobiographical Confessions, whose first six books were written in 1765 and published in 1782. Rousseau recounts an episode in which he was seeking bread to accompany some wine he had stolen. Feeling too elegantly dressed to go into an ordinary bakery, he recalled the words of a "great princess":

At length I remembered the last resort of a great princess who, when told that the peasants had no bread, replied: "Then let them eat brioches."

— Jean-Jacques Rousseau, Confessions

Rousseau does not name the "great princess", and he may have invented the anecdote altogether, as the Confessions is not considered entirely factual.

=== Attribution to Marie Antoinette ===
The phrase is alleged to have been said by Marie Antoinette, queen consort of France, during one of the bread shortages during the reign of her husband, Louis XVI. However, it was not attributed to her until half a century after her death. Anti-monarchists during the French Revolution never cited this anecdote, but it nevertheless acquired great symbolic importance in subsequent historical accounts when pro-revolutionary commentators employed the phrase to denounce the upper classes of the Ancien Régime as oblivious and rapacious. As one biographer of the Queen notes, it was a particularly powerful phrase because "the staple food of the French peasantry and the working class was bread, absorbing 50 percent of their income, as opposed to 5 percent on fuel; the whole topic of bread was therefore the result of obsessional national interest."

Rousseau's first six books were written in 1765, when Antoinette was nine years of age, and published when she was 26, eight years after she became queen.

The increasing unpopularity of Antoinette in the final years before the outbreak of the French Revolution also likely influenced many to attribute the phrase to her. During her marriage to Louis XVI, her critics often cited her perceived frivolousness and very real extravagance as factors that significantly worsened France's dire financial straits. Her Austrian birth and her sex also diminished her credibility further in a country where xenophobia and chauvinism were beginning to exert major influence in national politics. While the causes of France's economic woes extended far beyond the royal family's spending, anti-monarchist polemics demonized Antoinette as Madame Déficit, who had single-handedly ruined France's finances.

The phrase was attributed to Antoinette by Alphonse Karr in Les Guêpes of March 1843.^{[Note a]}

Objections to the legend of Antoinette and the comment centre on arguments concerning the Queen's personality, internal evidence from members of the French royal family and the date of the saying's origin. According to Antonia Fraser, the notorious story of the ignorant princess was first said 100 years before Antoinette in relation to Maria Theresa, the wife of Louis XIV, citing the memoirs of Louis XVIII, who was only fourteen when Rousseau's Confessions were written and whose own memoirs were published much later. Louis XVIII does not mention Antoinette in his account, but says that the story was an old legend and that the family always believed that Maria Theresa had originated the phrase.

Fraser also points out in her biography that Antoinette was a generous patron of charity and moved by the plight of the poor when it was brought to her attention, thus making the statement out of character for her.

A second consideration is that there were no actual famines during the reign of Louis XVI and only two incidents of serious bread shortages, the first in April–May 1775, a few weeks before the king's coronation on 11 June 1775, and the second in 1788, the year before the French Revolution. The 1775 shortages led to a series of riots that took place in northern, eastern and western France, known at the time as the Flour War (guerre des farines). Letters from Antoinette to her family in Austria at this time reveal an attitude largely contrary to the spirit of Let them eat brioche:

It is quite certain that in seeing the people who treat us so well despite their own misfortune, we are more obliged than ever to work hard for their happiness. The King seems to understand this truth.

— Marie Antoinette

Another problem with the dates surrounding the attribution is that when the phrase first appeared, Antoinette was not only too young to have said it, but living outside France as well. Although published in 1782, Rousseau's Confessions were finished thirteen years prior in 1769. Antoinette, only fourteen years old at the time, would not arrive at Versailles from Austria until 1770. Since she was completely unknown to him at the time of writing, she could not have possibly been the "great princess" he mentioned.

=== Other attributions ===
Another hypothesis is that after the revolution, the phrase, which was initially attributed to a great variety of princesses of the French royal family, eventually stuck on Antoinette because she was in effect the last and best-remembered "great princess" of Versailles. The myth had also been previously attributed to two of Louis XV’s daughters: Madame Sophie and Madame Victoire.

In his 1853 novel Ange Pitou, Alexandre Dumas attributes the quote to one of Antoinette's favourites, the Duchess of Polignac.

== Similar phrases ==
The Book of Jin, a 7th-century chronicle of the Chinese Jin Dynasty, reports that when Emperor Hui (259–307) of Western Jin was told that his people were starving because there was no rice, he said, "Why don't they eat porridge with (ground) meat?" (何不食肉糜), showing his unfitness.

== See also ==
- Noblesse oblige
- There's no money, but hang in there
- Pick another protein

== Notes ==
a.In an earlier 1841 volume of Les Guêpes, a slightly different version of the famous phrase was quoted: "S’il n’y a pas de pain on mangera de la brioche".

== Bibliography ==
- Barker, Nancy N., Let Them Eat Cake: The Mythical Marie Antoinette and the French Revolution, Historian, Summer 1993, 55:4:709.
- Campion-Vincent, Véronique and Shojaei Kawan, Christine, Marie-Antoinette et son célèbre dire : deux scénographies et deux siècles de désordres, trois niveaux de communication et trois modes accusatoires, Annales historiques de la Révolution française, 2002, p. 327
- Fraser, Antonia (2001). Marie Antoinette (1st ed.). New York: N.A. Talese/Doubleday. ISBN 978-0-385-48948-5.
- Lever, Évelyne (2006). Marie Antoinette: The Last Queen of France. London: Portrait. ISBN 978-0-7499-5084-2.
