= Anti-Corruption Foundation =

Russian nonprofit organization

- Фонд борьбы с коррупцией
- Logo since 2022
- Abbreviation: FBK (English); ФБК (Russian)
- Formation: 2011
- Founder: Alexei Navalny
- Dissolved: 9 June 2021 (in Russia)
- Type: NGO
- Purpose: Anti-corruption
- Chairwoman of the Board of Directors: Maria Pevchikh, since 22 March 2023
- Website: fbk.info

The Anti-Corruption Foundation (ACF; Russian: Фонд борьбы с коррупцией (ФБК), romanized: Fond borby s korruptsiyey, FBK; lit. 'Foundation for combating corruption') is a non-profit organisation established in 2011 by the Russian opposition figure Alexei Navalny. The FBK published investigations into alleged corruption by high-ranking Russian government officials. The organisation is funded by private donations.

On 9 October 2019, the FBK was declared a "foreign agent" by the Russian Ministry of Justice. On 9 June 2021, the FBK was designated as an "extremist" organisation and liquidated by the Moscow City Court. On 11 July 2022, while imprisoned, Navalny announced the relaunch of the FBK as an international organisation. On 27 November 2025, the Russian Supreme Court designated the FBK as a "terrorist organisation".

The European Court of Human Rights and Amnesty International have condemned the Russian Federation's legal actions against the FBK and Alexei Navalny, like the designations as "foreign agent", "extremist" and "terrorist", deeming them as politically motivated trial and political and unlawful persecutions.

== Mission ==
FBK Executive Director Vladimir Ashurkov formulated the fund's strategy as pressure on the authorities in order to push them towards internal reforms, working in two directions: organising situations in which government structures will feel pressure, and creating a real alternative to the current power system.

== History ==
=== Creation ===
The FBK was founded by Alexei Navalny. The Foundation was registered on 9 September 2011 (account No. 7714013315, OGRN 1117799018204). According to Vladimir Ashurkov, the founders of the fund gained experience in public and transparent fundraising by organising financing for the RosPil project. A significant amount was collected through the Yandex.Money payment system, which provided financial support for the project for a year. In parallel, the founders of the fund are working on the idea of involving on a permanent basis professional lawyers and economists in the search for and suppression of corruption schemes in the public procurement system. The contractual basis will allow to get some guarantees, in contrast to the scheme for working with volunteers.

=== Criminal case and "foreign agent" status ===
On 3 August 2019, the Investigative Committee of Russia (SKR) opened a criminal case against the FBK, accusing them of laundering ₽1 billion (c. US$15.5 mln). Later the amount was reduced to ₽75 million (c. US$1.15 mln).

On 5 September 2019, searches were conducted at the FBK office and at the "Navalny LIVE" studio.

Soon after the 2019 Moscow City Duma election, on 12 September 2019 the SKR carried out mass raids on the FBK regional offices in 40 Russian cities.

In September 2019, various state-owned companies filed lawsuits against the FBK for "organising riots", and the courts partially satisfied them in the amount of ₽5 million (c. US$78 000).

On 8 October 2019, the police filed a lawsuit against the FBK for "costs of maintaining order during rallies" in the amount of ₽18 million (c. US$280,000).

On 9 October 2019, the FBK was declared a "foreign agent" by the Ministry of Justice of the Russian Federation due to payments from the United States and Spain. One of these payments was the payment of US$50 made by Yuriy Maslikhov, a Russian citizen residing in the United States. In an interview with journalists, Yuriy Maslikhov stated that he had transferred the money from his PayPal account as an individual and he had been carrying out such donations earlier. Two other payments totalling ₽138,505.41 (c. US$2170) were carried out by Spanish citizen Roberto Fabio Monda Cardenas through CaixaBank on 6 and 17 September 2019. Answering a question of journalists how he, unable to speak Russian, found out the wire payment instructions of the Anti-Corruption Foundation after its removing from official website of the organisation, Roberto Fabio Monda Cardenas was unable to explain. These payments were carried out at a time when the bank account of the Anti-Corruption Foundation was frozen at the request of the Investigative Committee of Russia. Despite the fact that the Anti-Corruption Foundation gave the money back, Ministry of Justice of Russia refused to remove the Anti-Corruption Foundation from the register of "foreign agents".

On 15 October 2019, the SKR again carried out mass raids on the FBK regional offices in 30 Russian cities.

=== Change of legal entity and dissolution ===
In February 2019, the FBK published an investigation that reported that in December 2018, mass food poisoning of children occurred in kindergartens and schools in Moscow. The FBK blamed Concord Food Plant LLC, Moskovskiy Shkolnik LLC and VITO-1 LLC for this, which he linked with Yevgeny Prigozhin. Subsequently, Moscow schools No. 760 and No. 1554 assessed fines against Moskovskiy Shkolnik due to the supply of low-quality food.

In April 2019, Moskovskiy Shkolnik filed a lawsuit against the FBK, Navalny, FBK lawyer Lyubov Sobol, who was in charge of the investigation, and its former employee Natalya Shilova, who was involved in the investigation.

In October 2019, the Moscow Arbitration Court ordered Navalny to pay 29.2 million rubles as compensation for lost profits and damage to professional reputation. The court ordered Lyubov Sobol and the FBK to pay the same amount. The Court of Appeal upheld this decision.

In July 2020, Navalny said that he saw no reason to raise money to pay the "huge amount". He announced that the FBK would be liquidated, and that he and Sobol "until the end of Putin's power" would have to live with blocked accounts and bailiffs seizing any of their property in favour of "Putin's chef". Navalny said that he intended to revive the FBK shortly after as another legal entity.

=== Designation as an "extremist" organisation ===
Russian-language logo since 2020

On 16 April 2021, the Moscow prosecutor office requested the Moscow City Court to declare organisations linked to Navalny including the FBK and his headquarters as "extremist", claiming: "Under the disguise of liberal slogans, these organisations are engaged in creating conditions for the destabilisation of the social and socio-political situation." In response, Navalny aide Leonid Volkov stated: "Putin has just announced full-scale mass political repression in Russia."

On 26 April 2021, the Moscow prosecutor office ordered Navalny's network of regional offices to stop its activities, pending a ruling by the court on whether to designate them and the FBK as "extremist" organisations. The move was condemned by Germany and Amnesty International.

On 9 June 2021, Vyacheslav Polyga, judge of Moscow City Court, upheld the administrative claim of the prosecutor of Moscow city Denis Popov and, rejecting all the petitions of the defense, decided to declare the Anti-Corruption Foundation as an "extremist" organisation, to liquidate it and to confiscate its assets; a similar decision had been taken against the Citizens' Rights Protection Foundation; the activity of the Alexei Navalny staff was prohibited (case No.3а-1573/2021). The case hearing was held in camera because, as indicated by advocate Ilia Novikov, the case file including the text of the administrative claim was classified as a state secret. According to advocate Ivan Pavlov, Alexei Navalny was not a party to the proceedings and the judge refused to give him such status; at the hearing, the prosecutor stated that the defendants constitute "extremist" organisations because they want a change of power in Russia and they promised to help participants of the protest with payment of administrative and criminal fines and with making complaints to the European Court of Human Rights. On 4 August 2021, First Appellate Ordinary Court located in Moscow upheld the decision of the court of first instance (case No.66а-3553/2021) and this decision entered into force that day. On 28 December 2021, it was reported that Anti-Corruption Foundation, Citizens' Rights Protection Foundation and 18 natural persons including Alexei Navalny filed a cassation appeals to the Second Cassation Ordinary Court. On 25 March 2022, the Second Cassation Ordinary Court rejected all cassation appeals and upheld the judgements of lower courts (case No.8а-5101/2022).

Several members of the organisation, including Lilia Chanysheva (the head of the Ufa branch of the organisation) and Daniel Kholodny (the technical director of the foundation's YouTube channel), were arrested and sentenced to long prison sentences. Memorial considers them political prisoners.

=== Relaunch as international organisation ===
In January 2021, former Russian banker Alexander Zheleznyak registered the international non-profit Anti-Corruption Foundation (ACF) in the United States.

On 11 July 2022, Navalny announced the relaunch of the FBK as an international organisation with an advisory board including his wife Yulia Navalnaya, Guy Verhofstadt, Anne Applebaum, and Francis Fukuyama; Navalny also stated that the first contribution to Anti-Corruption Foundation International would be the Sakharov Prize ($50,000) that was awarded to him. On 4 October, allies of Navalny said they were relaunching his regional network to fight the mobilisation and war, saying it would be a "partisan underground" movement.

On 1 June 2023, the Ministry of Justice added the Anti-Corruption Foundation International to the list of "undesirable organisations"; earlier in December 2022, the ACF International was declared a "foreign agent".

After the death of Navalny in a Russian prison in February 2024, his wife Yulia Navalnaya leads the organisation.

On 15 April 2025, Russia sentenced four journalists (Antonina Favorskaya, Konstantin Gabov, Sergei Karelin, and Artem Kriger) to five and a half years in a penal colony. Prosecutors accused the four of producing material for the Anti-Corruption Foundation's YouTube channel.

On 22 October 2025, the Prosecutor General's Office petitioned the Supreme Court of Russia to designate the ACF as a "terrorist organisation". On 27 November 2025, the court designated the ACF as a "terrorist organisation".

== Notable investigations ==
=== 2013 ===
- Investigation of Vyacheslav Volodin, Sergey Neverov and other members of the United Russia party
- Investigation of Vladimir Yakunin, ex-RZD
- Investigation of Vladimir Pekhtin, MP
- Investigation of Sergey Sobyanin, Mayor of Moscow
- Investigation of Viacheslav Fetisov, member of the Federation Council, former ice hockey player

=== 2014 ===
- Investigation of Vladimir Zhirinovsky and his son Igor Lebedev, both members of parliament
- Investigation of Viktor Khristenko and his wife Tatyana Golikova, who were both in government
- Investigation affairs of Arkady Rotenberg and Boris Romanovich Rotenberg
- Investigation of Anton Drozdov, who was in charge of the Pension Fund of the Russian Federation

=== 2015 ===
- Chaika – film documenting the investigation of Prosecutor General of Russia Yury Chaika and his sons
- Investigation of Sergey Shoygu, Minister of Defence
- Investigation of Dmitry Peskov, press attaché to Vladimir Putin
- Investigation of Vladimir Yakunin and his son (addition)
- Investigation of Mikhail Kusnirovich
- Investigation of Roman Abramovich
- Investigation of Gennady Timchenko
- Investigation of Night Wolves (a motorcycle club under Putin's patronage)
- Investigation of Viacheslav Fetisov, member of the Federation Council, former ice hockey player (addition)

=== 2016 ===
- Investigation of Vyacheslav Volodin, Sergey Neverov and other members of the United Russia party
- Investigation of a General of the FSB right on the border
- Investigation of Yevgeny Prigozhin, chief of Web brigades and Trolls from Olgino (Russia's governmental troll army)
- Investigation of Petr Kolbin, friend and secret purse of Vladimir Putin
- Investigation of Igor Sechin's wife
- Investigation of Nikolay Merkushkin, governor of Samara Oblast
- Investigation of Igor Shuvalov, First Deputy Prime Minister of Russia
- Investigation of Maxim Liksutov in the case of Sergei Magnitsky
- Investigation of Viktor Zolotov, Director of the National Guard of Russia
- Investigation of Dmitry Rogozin, Deputy Prime Minister of Russia, in charge of the defense industry
- Investigation of Aleksandr Sidyakin, member of parliament
- Investigation of Dmitry Medvedev, Russian Prime Minister

=== 2017 ===
- He Is Not Dimon to You – investigation of Prime Minister of Russia Dmitry Medvedev

=== 2018 ===
- Investigation of Sergei Prikhodko, First Deputy Head of the Russian Government Office

=== 2019 ===
- Investigation of Andrey Metelsky, the deputy of the Moscow City Duma
- Investigation of Lyudmila Stebenkova, the deputy of the Moscow City Duma
- Investigation of Stepan Orlov, the deputy of the Moscow City Duma
- Investigation of Kirill Shchitov, the deputy of the Moscow City Duma
- Investigation of Alexei Shaposhnikov, the chairman of the Moscow City Duma
- Investigation of Vladimir Platonov, the former chairman of the Moscow City Duma
- Investigation of Natalya Sergunina, the vice-mayor of Moscow
- Investigation of Alexander Gorbenko, the vice-mayor of Moscow
- Investigation of Pyotr Biryukov, the vice-mayor of Moscow
- Investigation of Valentin Gorbunov, the head of the MCEC
- Investigation of Boris Ebzeev, member of the CEC
- Investigation of Nikolay Bulaev, the vice-chairman of the CEC
- Investigation of Anton Siluanov, Russian Minister of Finance

=== 2021 ===
- A Palace for Putin. The Story of the Biggest Bribe – investigation of President Vladimir Putin
- Investigation of Sergey Lavrov

=== 2022 ===
- Yacht Scheherazade – investigation of President Vladimir Putin

== Financing ==
The FBK is funded by money transfers from its supporters; mostly these are donations from ordinary people. According to Ashurkov, "constant fundraising is a necessary condition for the functioning" of the fund. The creators want to build a system that will allow the fund "not to depend on one source of funding". In April 2012, the creators estimated the fund's annual budget at approximately $300,000. If more funds are available, the fund will expand.

In 2013, the fund raised 23 million rubles through donations. In 2014 the budget was 28.5 million rubles; in 2016, it was 45 million rubles.

=== First public sponsors ===
The first public sponsors of the fund on 13 February 2012 were the son of the founder of PJSC VimpelCom, businessman Boris Zimin (confirmed that he had already given 300,000 rubles and will give about the same amount every month) and former manager of Alfa Group Vladimir Ashurkov (confirmed that gave 300,000 rubles). On 30 May 2012, the list of the first 16 sponsors of the fund was announced:

№	Name	Notes
1	Vladimir Ashurkov	Executive director of the Fund
2	Roman Borisovich	Vice President of Rosgosstrakh LLC
3	Dmitry Bykov	Writer
4	Sergey Grechishkin	Managing Partner, Alcantara Asset Management
5	Sergey Guriyev	Former rector of the New Economic School
6	Ekaterina Zhuravskaya	Professor at the Paris School of Economics and the New Economic School
7	Boris Zimin	Entrepreneur
8	Kirill Irtyuga	Partner of RosinvestHotel Management Company
9	Alexander Lebedev	Chairman of the Board of Directors of the National Reserve Corporation
10	Artyom Lyubimov	First Deputy General Director of Bolshoi Gorod CJSC (accounting services)
11	Leonid Parfyonov	Journalist
12	Pavel Prosyankin	Financier
13	Alexey Savchenko	Director for Strategic Planning, Alfa Group Consortium
14	Denis Sokolov	Entrepreneur
15	Victor Yarutov	Businessman, co-owner of the Nienschanz Group of Companies
16	Boris Akunin	Writer

According to Navalny, "they have already transferred 4.4 million rubles, and guaranteed another 4 million for the second half of the year", which provides most of the planned annual budget of the fund ($300,000).

According to Vladimir Ashurkov and Navalny, the negotiations took place for three months, and some of those with whom they took place eventually decided to refrain from making contributions to the fund. However, many of those who ended up supporting the project, despite not being bound by any contractual obligations, promised to make regular donations. This allows to plan the activities of the fund. In case of an increase in voluntary contributions, it is planned to develop the staff of the fund's projects, giving a special role to the anti-corruption "RosPil". Moreover, all business representatives support the fund financially as individuals.

According to Navalny, in order to help potential donors decide to support the fund and similar projects, the first of those who have already done so will announce their names. And Vladimir Ashurkov suggested that later the names of those who financially support the fund will not be made public, except for cases when the donors themselves ask for it. Ashurkov said that Alfa Group's top manager Alexei Savchenko appeared on the list of sponsors thanks to his acquaintance with him. Navalny noted that the fund has no other sponsors from Alpha. Political scientist Stanislav Belkovsky noted the interest of representatives of big business in the opposition, highlighting Mikhail Fridman.

As a funding strategy for the fund, Navalny stated the collection of small donations, but with the involvement of a wide range of donors, emphasising the importance of mass support.

== Team ==
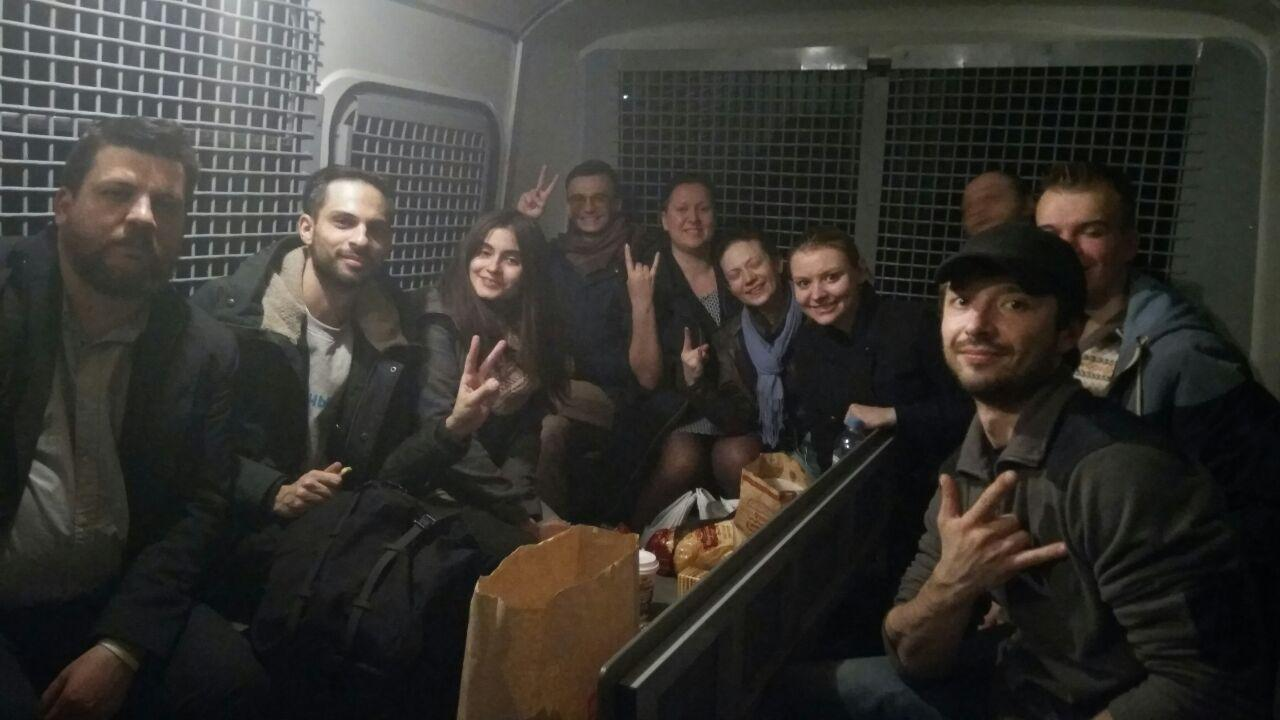
Volunteers and employees of the Anti-Corruption Foundation arrested on 26 March 2017

=== Current leadership ===
Position	Name
Founder of the FBK	Alexey Navalny
Director of the FBK	Vladislav Romantsov
Executive manager	Vladimir Ashurkov
Press secretary	Kira Yarmysh
Creative director	Varvara Mikhaylova
Head of the legal department	Vyacheslav Gimadi
"Navalny Live" YouTube channel producer	Lyubov Sobol
Anti-corruption project "RosPil"	Alexander Golovach
Anti-corruption project "RosYama"	Anatoly Kravchenko
Head of Investigation Department	Maria Pevchikh
Deputy Head of Investigation Department	Georgy Alburov
Head of IT department	Vladislav Romantsov

=== Team members ===
The FBK project managers are Ruslan Shaveddinov, Ilya Pakhomov. The legal department includes: Alexander Pomazuev, Vladlen Los, Evgeny Zamyatin. Valery Zolotukhin is also involved in the RosPil project. In addition, the team includes video production manager Vitaly Kolesnikov, mailing list manager Yan Matveyev, editor Maria Zakharova, office manager Olga Bulaeva.

The director of the fund from 2013 to December 2018 was Roman Rubanov. Since December 2018, the head of the legal department of the fund, Ivan Zhdanov, has been appointed director.

Since February 2012, the executive director of the fund has been Vladimir Ashurkov, who was forced to leave Alfa Group to work at the FBK.

== Media ==
The FBK created its own media, 'Leviathan', in order to have a possibility to register for press conferences of Vladimir Putin and make a request to authorities. Since 2016 it has been publishing one news item per day. The name 'Leviathan' was taken from Leviathan, 2014 award-winning film by Andrey Zvyagintsev.

=== Films ===
The FBK has made the following films:

- Chaika, 2015 film about corruption of Prosecutor General of Russia Yury Chaika;
- He Is Not Dimon to You, 2017 film about umpteen properties used by Prime Minister of Russia Dmitry Medvedev.
- Yachts, oligarchs, girls: a hunter for men exposes a bribe taker, 2018 film about informal relations between Russian businessman Oleg Deripaska and member of the Russian government Sergei Prikhodko, as well as possible sexual relations between Sergei Prikhodko and an employee of the escort agency Anastasia Vashukevich.
- Putin's Palace (2021)

== Controversies ==
In May 2017, the FBK removed a video "Who owns all of Russian television?" about the media assets of businessman Yury Kovalchuk, one day after its publication. According to Vedomosti, the video was taken down because it contained factual errors and outdated information. Navalny's spokeswoman, Kira Yarmysh, apologised, thanked those who had pointed out the errors, and said that a new video on the same subject would be prepared.

In February 2019, the FBK published a video in which a woman identified as Natalya Shilova, described as a former employee of a company connected to Yevgeny Prigozhin's Concord group, alleged that poor-quality food had been supplied to schools and kindergartens. After social media users pointed out that one of the photographs used in the video was fake, the FBK removed the video and re-uploaded it with the image omitted. Concord denied that Shilova had worked with the company. In an interview with Meduza, FBK lawyer Lyubov Sobol said that the foundation had not attempted to verify Shilova's claims because the video was "not an investigation".

In April 2021, 600,000 email addresses of people who had registered for a protest were leaked from the "Freedom for Navalny!" campaign website. According to the BBC Russian Service, an expanded database later appeared online containing 112,000 email addresses together with information about places of residence, study or work, as well as telephone numbers. The BBC reported at least 1,421 instances in which law-enforcement officers questioned people whose data appeared in the leaked databases. In July 2021, a vulnerability on the Smart Voting website led to the leak of 191,000 email addresses of users registered with the project. The FBK acknowledged the error.

In March 2023, the FBK's investigation "Black Cash Desk: How Simonyan, Venediktov and Sobchak Receive Millions from Sobyanin" was criticised by journalist Liza Lazerson and politician Maxim Katz, particularly in relation to its claims about former Echo of Moscow editor-in-chief Alexei Venediktov.

In July 2024, Katz accused the FBK of assisting former Russian banker Alexander Zheleznyak, who had been accused of large-scale fraud in connection with the collapse of Probusinessbank, by providing testimony in foreign courts in support of the argument that Zheleznyak's prosecution was politically motivated. Leonid Volkov rejected Katz's allegations, describing them as false. In October 2024, The Bell published an account of the bank's collapse based on court records and sworn testimony, while The Insider, citing documents and explanations provided by bankers, reported that infrastructure associated with Zheleznyak and Sergei Leontiev had been used for money laundering, regulatory evasion and transfers to offshore structures.

In May 2026, Meduza published an interview with Irina Alleman, a former presenter on the FBK's YouTube project Popular Politics, who had left the foundation in late April. Alleman said that she had repeatedly raised questions with the FBK's leadership about its communication strategy, the prosecution of donors, and the foundation's response to public controversies. She also described what she called a toxic working environment, alleging that employees who disagreed with the leadership had faced pressure, bullying, or informal ostracism, and said that the FBK had become increasingly focused on conflicts with other Russian opposition figures rather than on its original anti-corruption agenda. the FBK representatives rejected or downplayed parts of her criticism. Leonid Volkov said that Alleman had resigned voluntarily and that issues such as the editorial policy of Popular Politics, hiring and dismissals, and internal office management were outside his area of responsibility. Maria Pevchikh said that the format of publicly discussing a former employee's claims against a former employer was inappropriate, while Ruslan Shaveddinov denied that Popular Politics had problems with Ukrainian speakers and said that the channel remained anti-war.

== See also ==
- 2019 Moscow City Duma election
- 2019 Moscow protests
- 2021 Russian protests
- Corruption in Russia
- Smart Voting
- Transparency International Russia
