= Platon (toll system) =

Russian electronic toll collection system

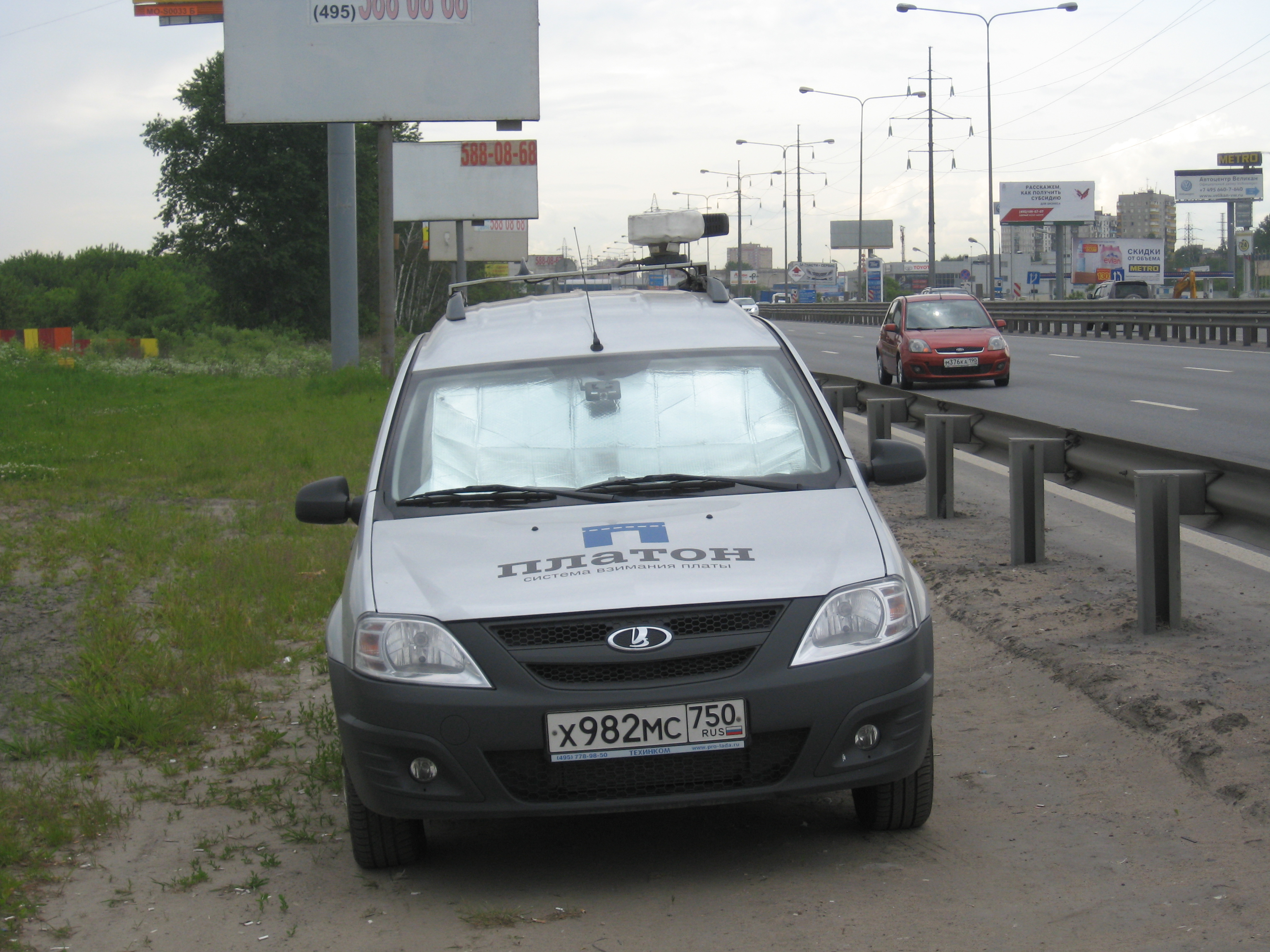
June 12, 2017, Platon truck collection system in action

Platon (Russian: Платон) is an electronic toll collection system established in Russia in November 2015. The toll is collected from trucks over 12 tonnes, with the proceedings going to a federal fund for road maintenance. A subsidiary of the state-owned Rostec corporation holds a 50% stake in the collection system operator, with the Putin-associated Rotenberg oligarchs owning the other half.

The objective of the Platon system is to offset the damage caused by heavy trucks to the country's major highways. As of April 2017, road users who drive vehicles included in the scheme are required to pay a levy of 1.90 rubles ($0.03 in 2015) per kilometer. Rosavtodor, the Russian federal agency for road transport, asserts that 58% of the damage to roads is caused by heavy trucks. Revenues from the system amounted to 22 billion rubles in 2016. As of November 2018, the cumulative revenue was €789 million.

== History ==
Originally scheduled for launch in 2013, the first detailed technical study for the implementation of the nationwide truck tolling system envisioned the construction of microwave-based sensor gantries on all road segments of all major highways in Russia, similar to the system implemented in Austria in 2004. Once it was decided to implement the system using GNSS road pricing rather than an infrastructure-based solution, the tolled road network applied to all National Roads for a total length of 50,000 km – making it the largest single tolling system in the world.

=== Controversy ===
The implementation of the system sparked protest among truck drivers across Russia, especially in the Dagestan region. Most truckers in Russia own and operate their vehicles as independent contractors, and many fear the levy will render their businesses unprofitable. According to independent Russian media, the operation of the Platon system is considered to be unfair and ineffective, with reports that up to 70% of the trucks avoid paying the distance-based fees.

== Legislative framework ==
The basis of the toll collection system is Federal Law 68-FZ of April 6, 2011, making changes to the Code of the Russian Federation on Administrative Offenses, Federal Law No.257-FZ "On Highways" and the Budget Code of the Russian Federation. Law No.68-FZ establishes the obligation to pay a fee when driving on federal highways for vehicles with a permitted maximum weight of over 12 tons. This law prohibits movement without payment, moreover, establishes administrative responsibility for movement without payment. The launch of the system was scheduled by law for November 15, 2015. Resolution of the Government of Russia dated June 14, 2013 No.504 determined the procedure for charging fees.

The operation of the system is also regulated by Article 31.1 of Federal Law No.257-FZ "On Highways", the provisions of the Administrative Code and the regulation amending the Budget Code and establishing the procedure for crediting money.

In accordance with the Decree of the Government of the Russian Federation dated August 29, 2014 No. 1662-r, a 13-year concession agreement was concluded between the Federal Road Agency and RT-invest Transport Systems LLC, which prescribes all the details of the project and the creation of the system.

== Financial indicators ==
From November 15, 2015 to May 2016 the Platon system brought more than 8 billion rubles to the federal road fund, 248,000 freight carriers and logistics companies and 719,000 vehicles were registered in it.

In 2016 about 22 billion rubles were collected through the Platon system.

In 2019 31 billion rubles were collected, and 93 billion rubles for all time.

By November 15, 2023 over seven years of operation, the budget received more than 250 billion rubles from the Platon system, including fines collected from violating cargo carriers. By this time, more than 811,000 Russian and foreign cargo carriers have registered over 1.8 million trucks in the system.

== Investments and payback ==
According to the operator of the system, investments in its creation amounted to more than 29 billion rubles, of which 2 billion at the expense of shareholders' own funds and 27 billion at the expense of a loan provided by Gazprombank.

For the creation of infrastructure and a service network of federal coverage, operation and modernization, the system operator receives from the federal budget from 10.6 billion rubles per year from the moment of launch until the end of the concession agreement.

According to the operator's statements, almost the entire payment will be spent on servicing the system and the loan, with an expected profit of 5%.

== See also ==
- Vignette (road tax)
