= Chaika (film) =

Chaika (Seagull)
- Russian: Чайка
- Narrated by: Alexei Navalny
- Production company: Anti-Corruption Foundation
- Distributed by: Anti-Corruption Foundation
- Release date: December 1, 2015 (YouTube)
- Running time: 43 minutes
- Country: Russia
- Languages: Russian (with Russian, English, Bulgarian, German, Polish and Finnish subtitles)
- Budget: 250 000 Rubles

External videos
- "Chaika" with english subs

Chaika (Russian: Чайка - Seagull) is a 2015 Russian documentary film about the corrupt affairs and some other crimes of Prosecutor General of Russia Yury Chaika and his sons, Artyom Chaika and Igor Chaika.

== Content ==
The film tells about crimes of Chaika family, connections with criminal leaders and acquiring enterprises.

== Award ==
Winner of Artdocfest festival (nominee ArtDocSet') in 2015.

== In media ==
On 3 February 2016, the group Pussy Riot released a satirical music video titled Chaika, alluding to Navalny's findings.
