= Minin and Pozharsky Square =

Square in Nizhny Novgorod, Russia

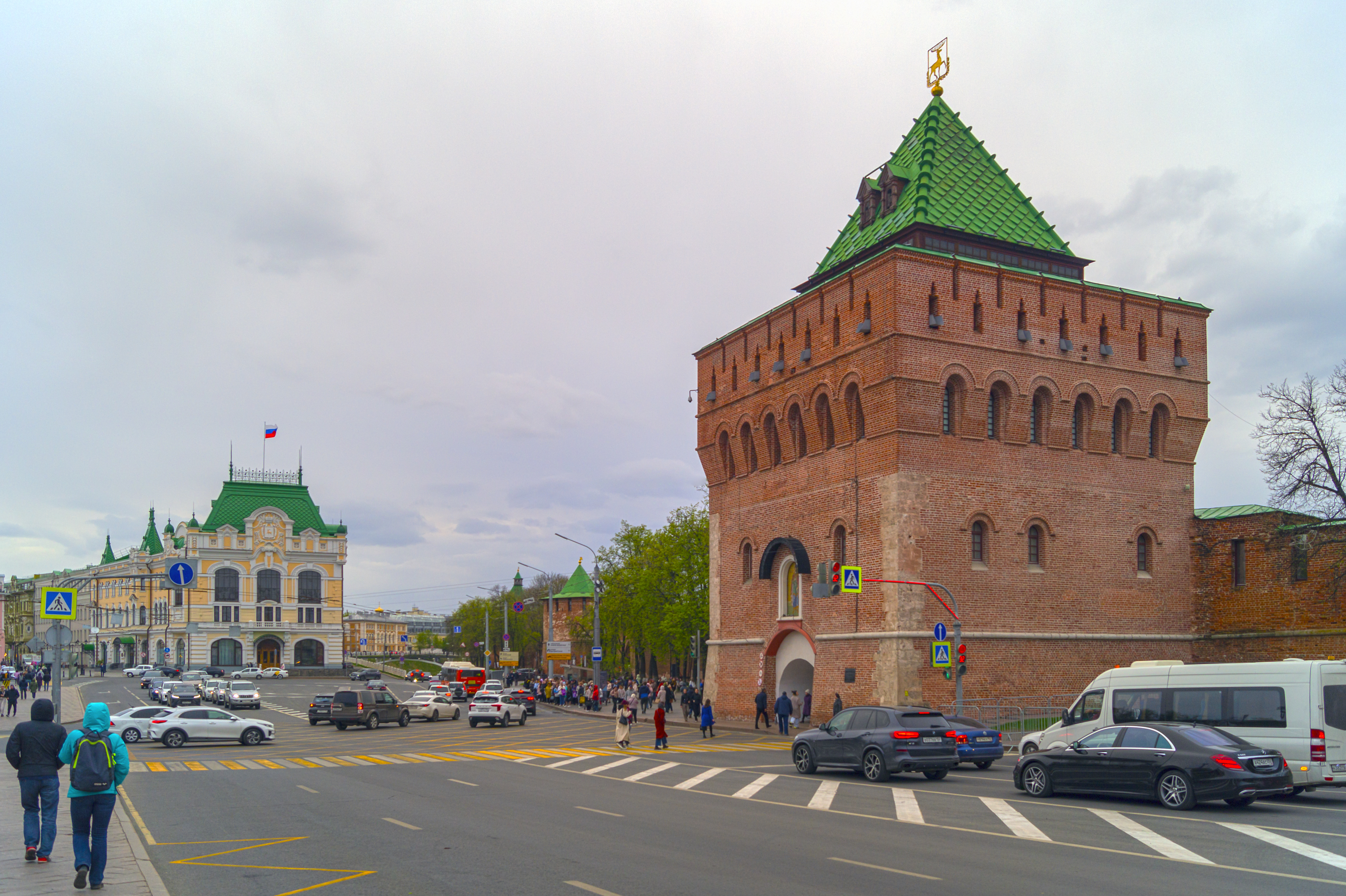
- View of the square in 2025

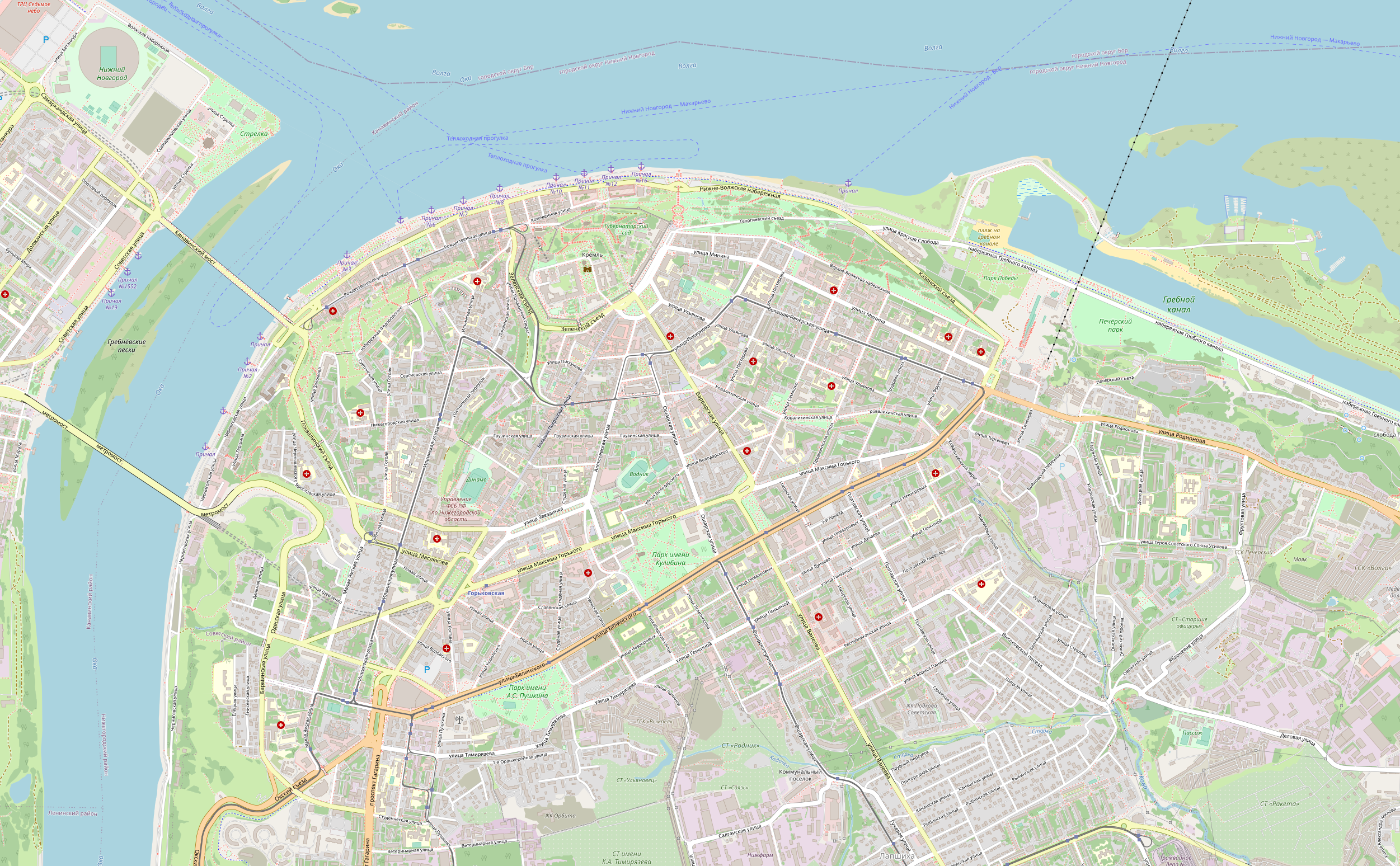
- Location within Nizhny Novgorod
- Native name: Площадь Минина и Пожарского (Russian)
- Former names: Annunciation; Soviet
- Namesake: Kuzma Minin and Dmitry Pozharsky
- Maintained by: City Duma of Nizhny Novgorod
- Location: Nizhegorodsky District, Nizhny Novgorod, Russia
- Postal code: 603001
- Coordinates: 56.326944°N 44.005833°E
- North: Upper Volga embankment
- East: The Kremlin
- South: Bolshaya Pokrovskaya, Pozharsky streets and Zelensky Descent
- West: Minin, Ulyanov, Varvarskaya, Alexeevskaya streets

Construction
- Completion: c. 1787

Other
- Designer: Yakov Ananyin

The Minin and Pozharsky Square (Russian: Площадь Минина и Пожарского, romanized: Ploshchad Minina i Pozharskogo), also known as just Minin Square, is the main square of Nizhny Novgorod. It is a social and cultural center of the city, the venue of the most important celebrations. It is located in the historical centre of the old town from the southeast side of the Kremlin.

The square connects the central streets of the city: Bolshaya Pokrovskaya, Varvarskaya, Ulyanov, Minin, Upper Volga embankment and Zelensky Descent. There are many architectural monuments, the Minin University, Lobachevsky University and the Medical University; monuments to Minin, Chkalov; Exhibition Complex, as well as the first city fountain. The square is the roadway. Movement on it overlaps only on holidays and at the time of other events.

== History ==
=== Russian tsardom ===
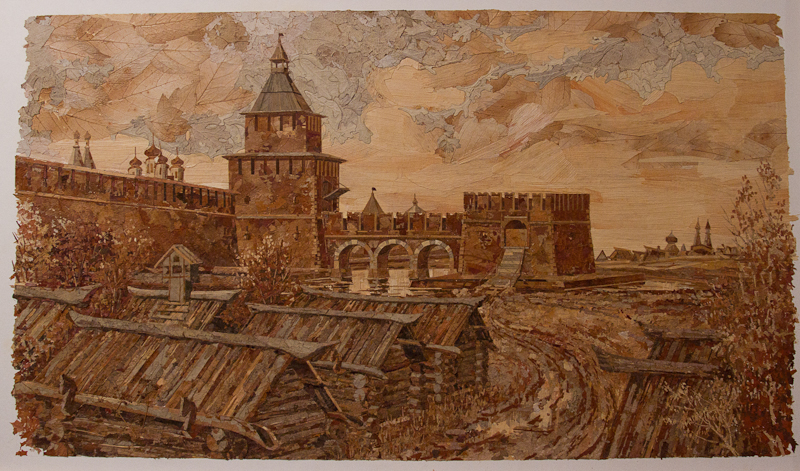
Nizhny Novgorod Kremlin. Dmitrievskaya Tower with a bridgehead. 17th century. Alexander Yurkov

Before the square began to take shape, wooden houses, forges and a deep moat filled with water to prevent penetration into the Kremlin were located in its place.

Initially, the square was unofficially called the Verkhneposadskaya (Russian: Верхнепосадская, lit. 'Upper Posad'). It was the center of the Upper Posad: here were overland trade routes, there was bargaining, to ensure the needs of the upper part of the city.

The passing tower was connected by a stone arched bridge with a bridgehead – a pentagonal diversion archer surrounded by a moat. Thus, attacks on the Kremlin were repelled during the raids from the Kazan Khanate. A few years after the construction of the tower, in 1378, a wooden church was built in front of it in the name of St. Demetrius of Thessalonica, which, according to one version, gave the name to the tower itself. In 1641 the church of St. Alexei Metropolitan. In 1697, the wooden church of Demetrius of Thessalonica was replaced by a stone Annunciation Cathedral (Russian: Благовещенский собор, romanized: Blagoveshchensky sobor) was built and square was called Blagoveshchenskaya (Annunciation). From the square through the Dmitrievskaya tower, Ivanovsky descent still passes, connecting the former upper and lower cities.

=== Russian empire ===
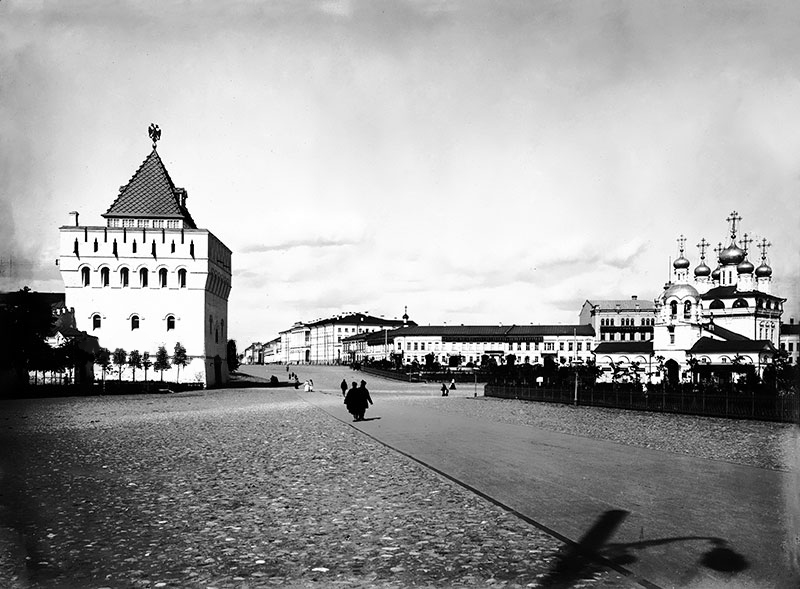
Annunciation square and Annunciation Cathedral. Photo by Maxim Dmitriev

The first regular plan of the square was drawn up in 1770. After the fire of 1768, at the request of the governorate authorities, a regular city development plan was drawn up in the St Petersburg Construction Commission, but the lack of local experienced urban planners hampered the implementation of the plan.

The transformation of the square began in 1779, when Yakov Ananin was appointed architect. In 1782, the ancient bridgeheads were dismantled, the ditch was filled. In its place rows of wooden trade stalls were built. During the general demarcation of the city in 1784–1787, new streets were laid and wooden buildings in the center of the square were destroyed. In 1787 a complex of buildings of the Post Office was built. The line between the Varvarskaya and Tikhonov (now Ulyanov) streets was occupied by the manor with the outbuildings of the vice-governor Pyotr Yelagin. Private houses on the sides of the square, which did not correspond to the plan, were preserved until the beginning of the 19th century. The buildings were not repaired, so that later they could be demolished.

=== The Soviet period ===
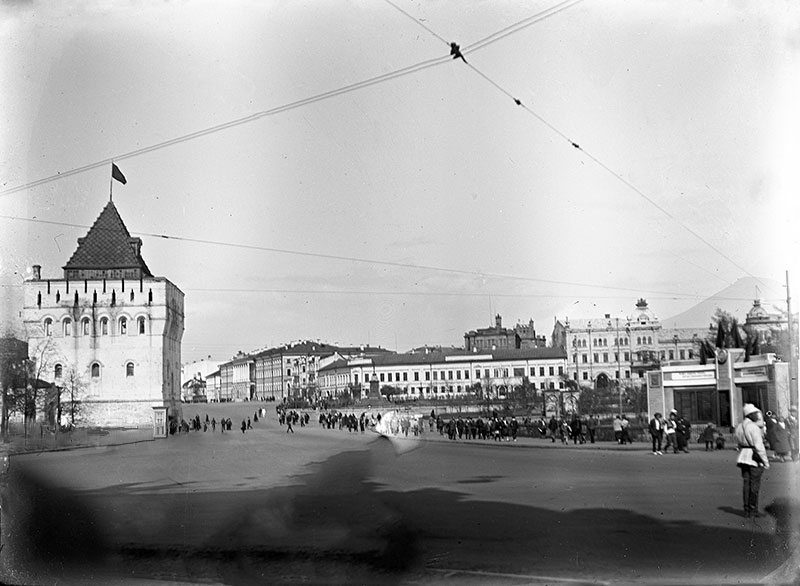
Soviet Square. The 1930s

After the Russian Revolution, the Annunciation Square was renamed into Soviet Square. All the church utensils were plundered in the Annunciation Cathedral and the Church of St. Alexius the Metropolitan, and a variety of commercial shops were opened in the buildings themselves. In the 1930s of the 20th century, both churches were demolished. Also bolsheviks was demolished, recently installed, a monument to Alexander II. For a long time, only an empty pedestal remained, but it was also decided to destroy it.

In 1935–1937, the Leningrad Institute "Giprogor" developed a general plan for the socialist city of Gorky (the name of Nizhny Novgorod in the Soviet period), which implied a radical change in the existing planning structure. Soviet Square at that time was designed round, its area significantly increased due to the demolition of some of the walls and towers of the Kremlin, which was perceived in those years as "a monument to avaricious feudalism and the tsarist autocracy, a witness to the terrible pages of the bloody past". The implementation of these projects was prevented by the outbreak of World War II in the Soviet Union.

In 1943, at the regular meeting of the Gorky Regional Committee, it was decided to raise the morale of citizens, in the fight against Nazism. For this purpose, the first monument to Kuzma Minin was erected on the square. And it began to be called the Minin and Pozharsky Square.

In 1985, the old monument to Minin was dismantled and sent to the restoration in Balakhna, where he remained. Four years later, in 1989, a new monument was erected by the Soviet sculptor Oleg Komov.

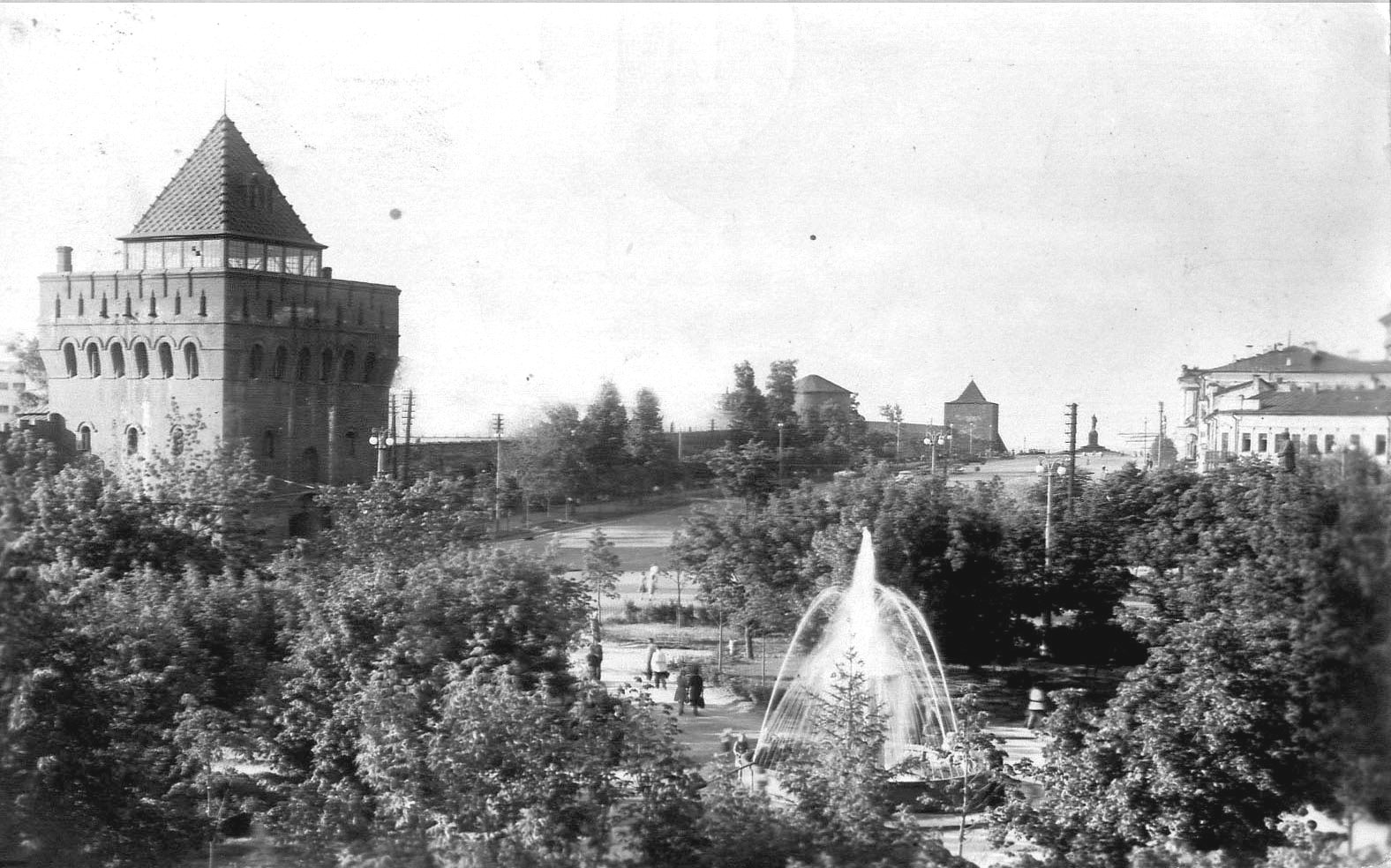
Sovetskaya Square. 1940

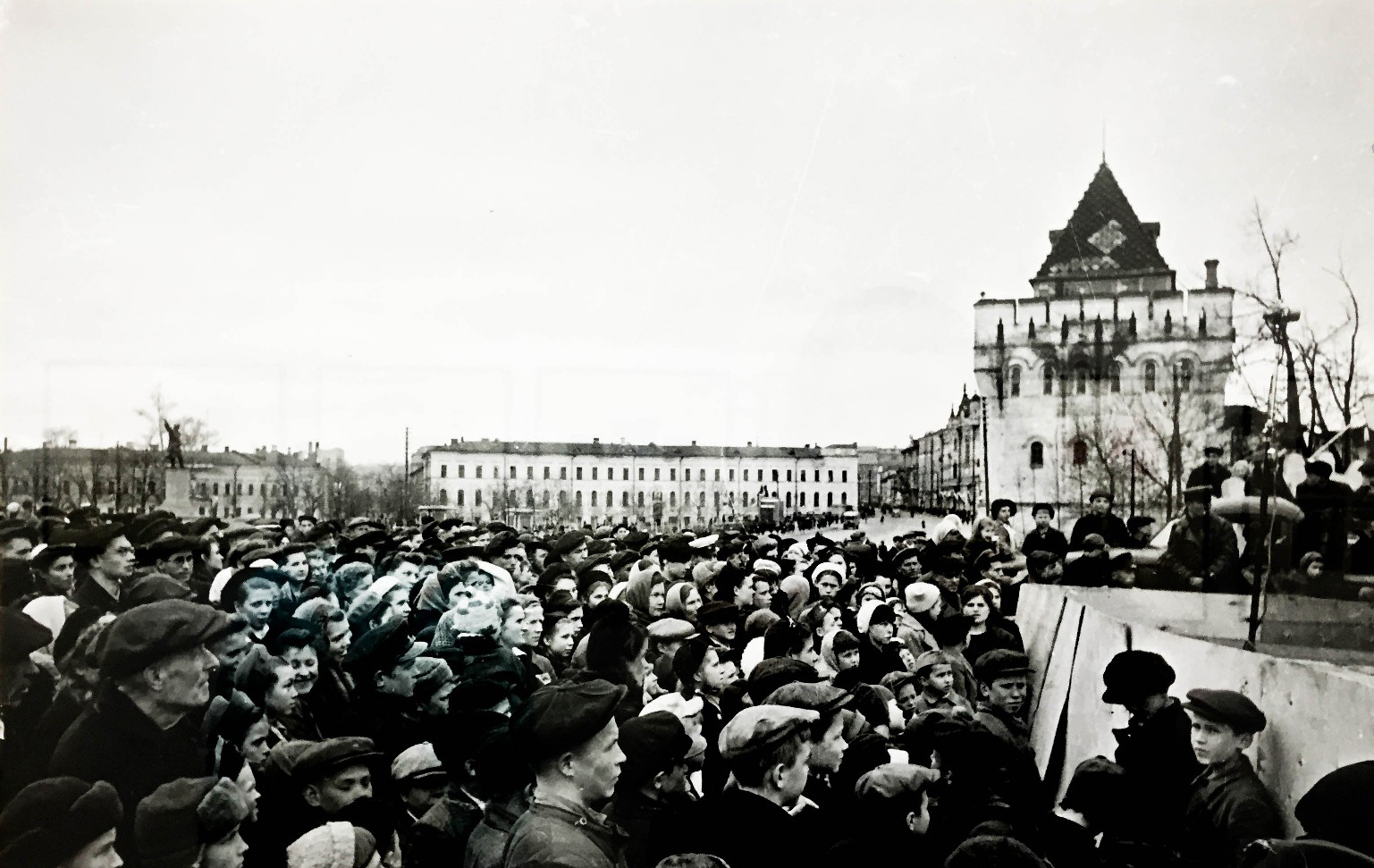
Citizens listen to the announcement of the capitulation of Germany in World War II in the Minin and Pozharsky Square

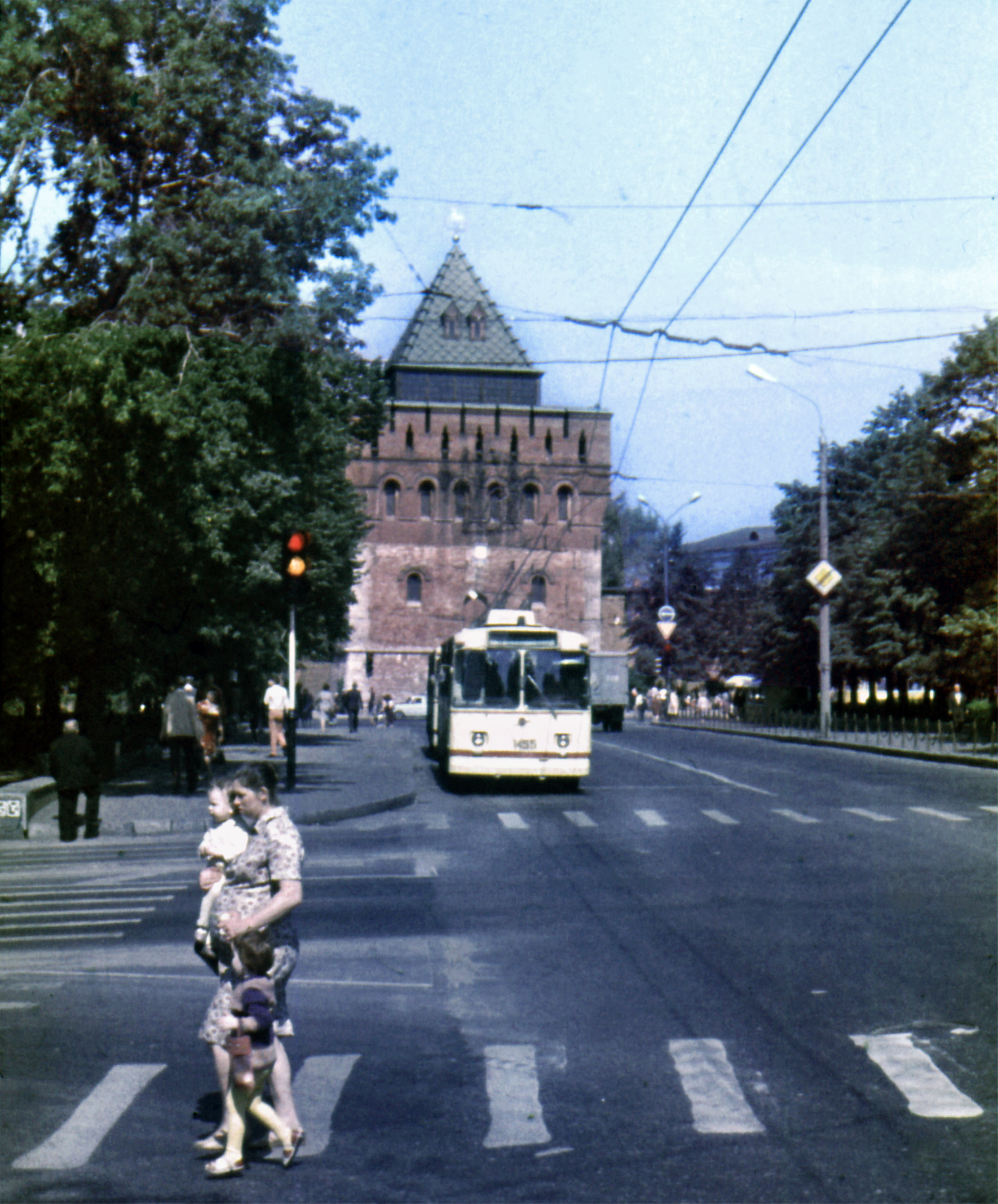
Dmitrovskaya Tower of the Kremlin

=== Present time ===
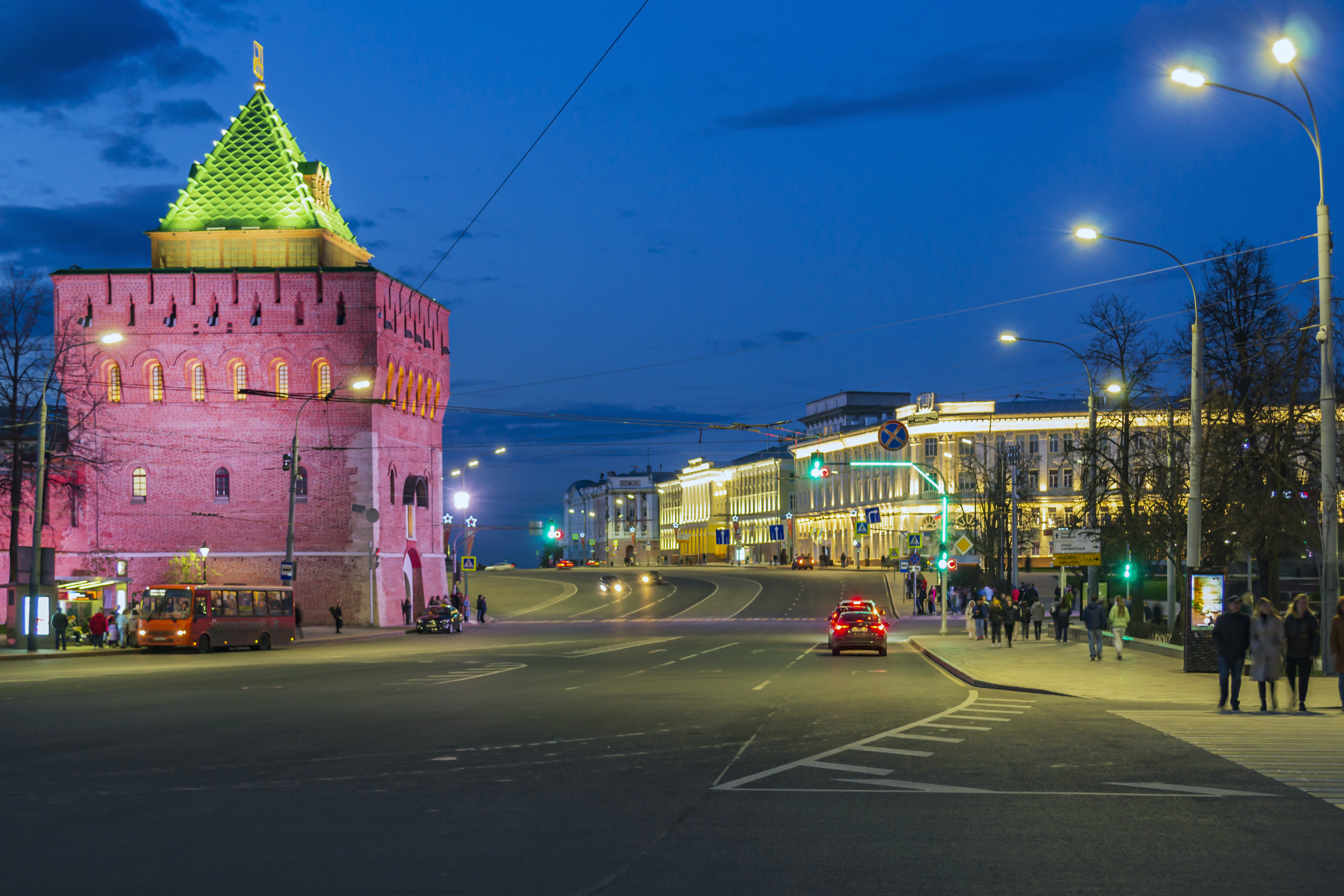
Minin and Pozharsky Square. 2022

After the dissolution of the Soviet Union, in the early 1990s, single stalls and trading tents began to be installed on the square. In the early 2000s, an initiative was launched in the city to eliminate small retail outlets in central squares and streets.

In early 2009, the administration of the city and the region considered the projects for the reconstruction of the Minin and Pozharsky Square, proposed by investors. The change in the habitual form of the square was regarded as unacceptable. The town-planning council under the governor approved one of the projects, despite the need for many years of preliminary work of archaeologists, as well as the danger of deteriorating the transport situation due to the emergence of an additional center of attraction.

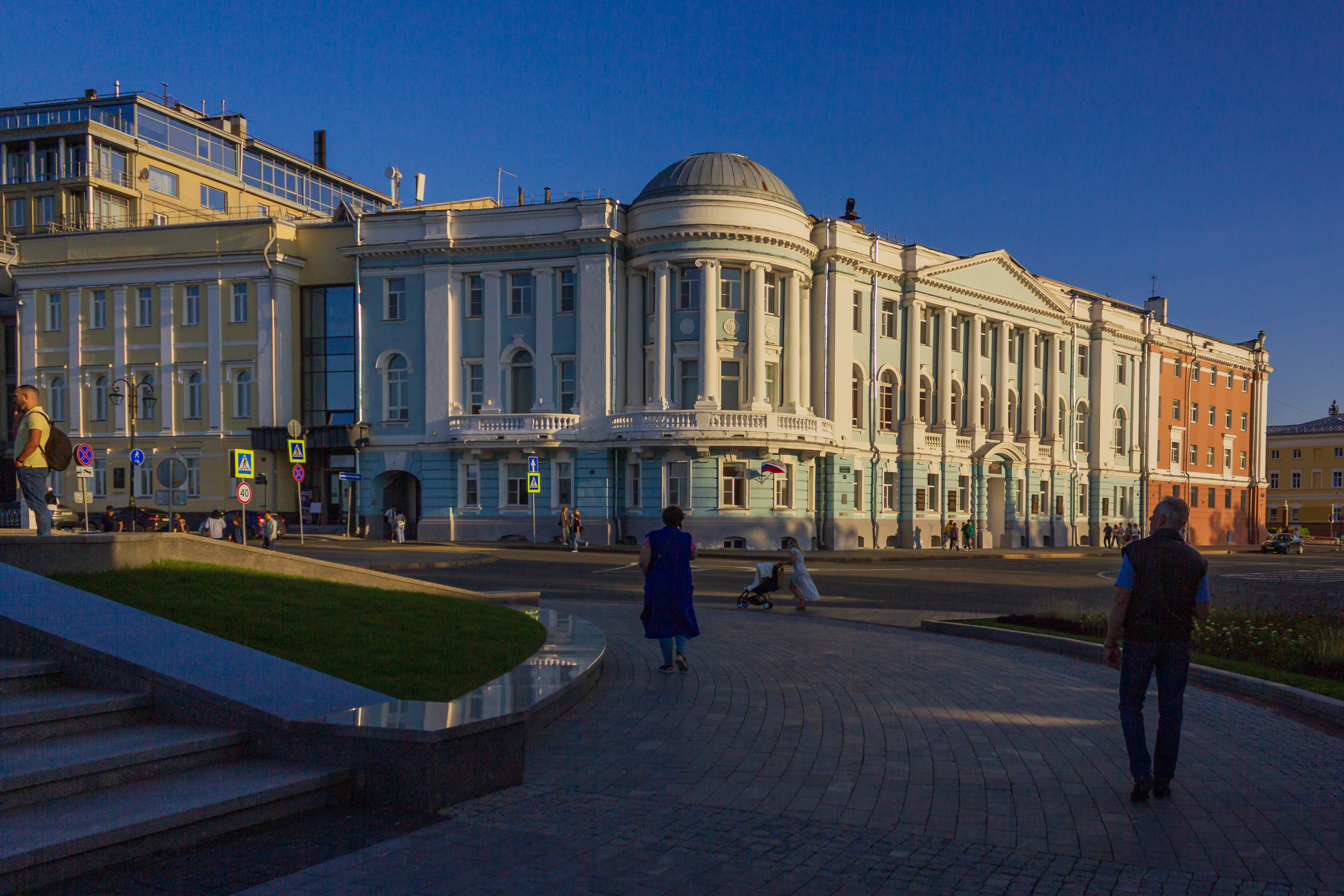
The Medical University

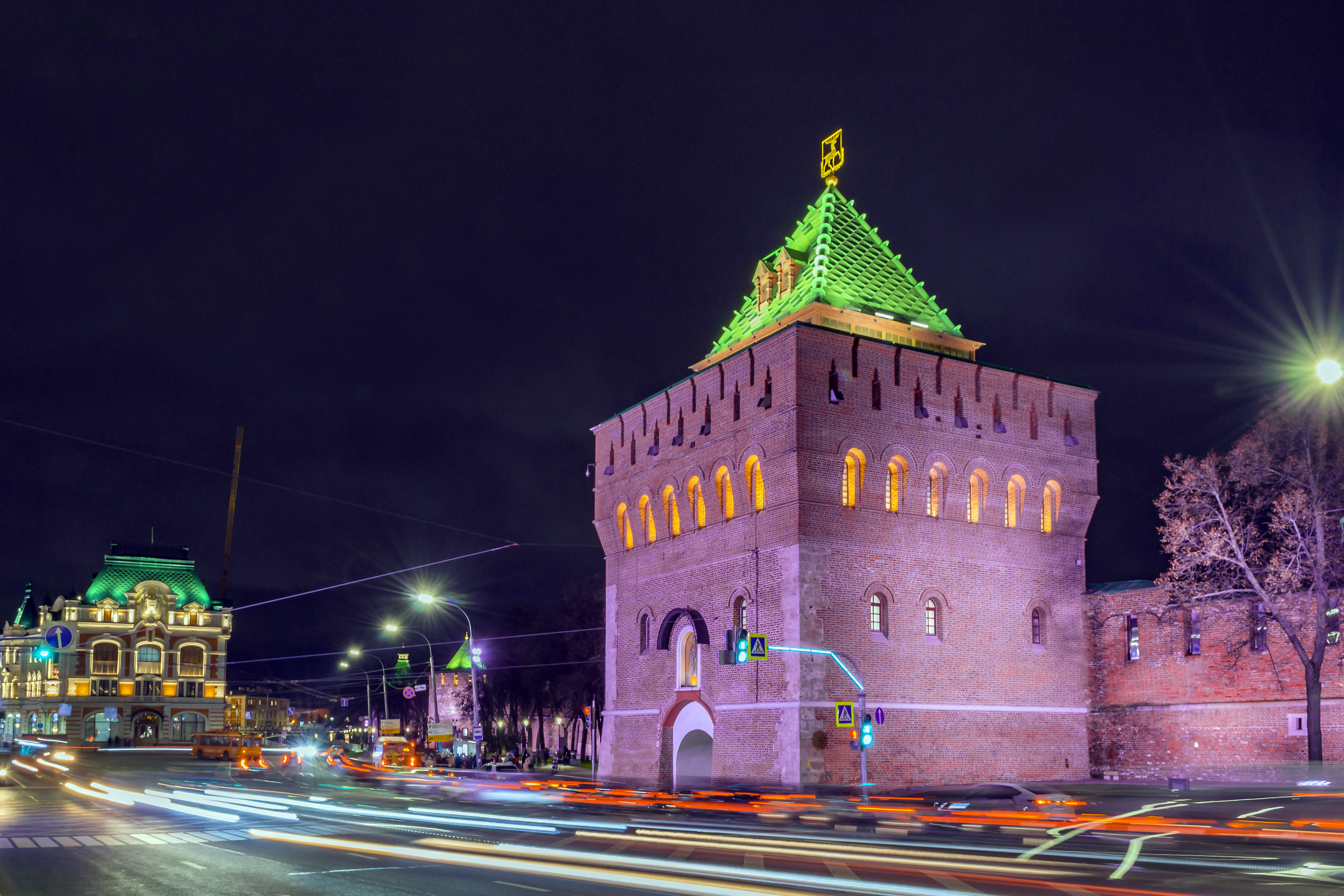
Dmitrievskaya Tower of the Kremlin

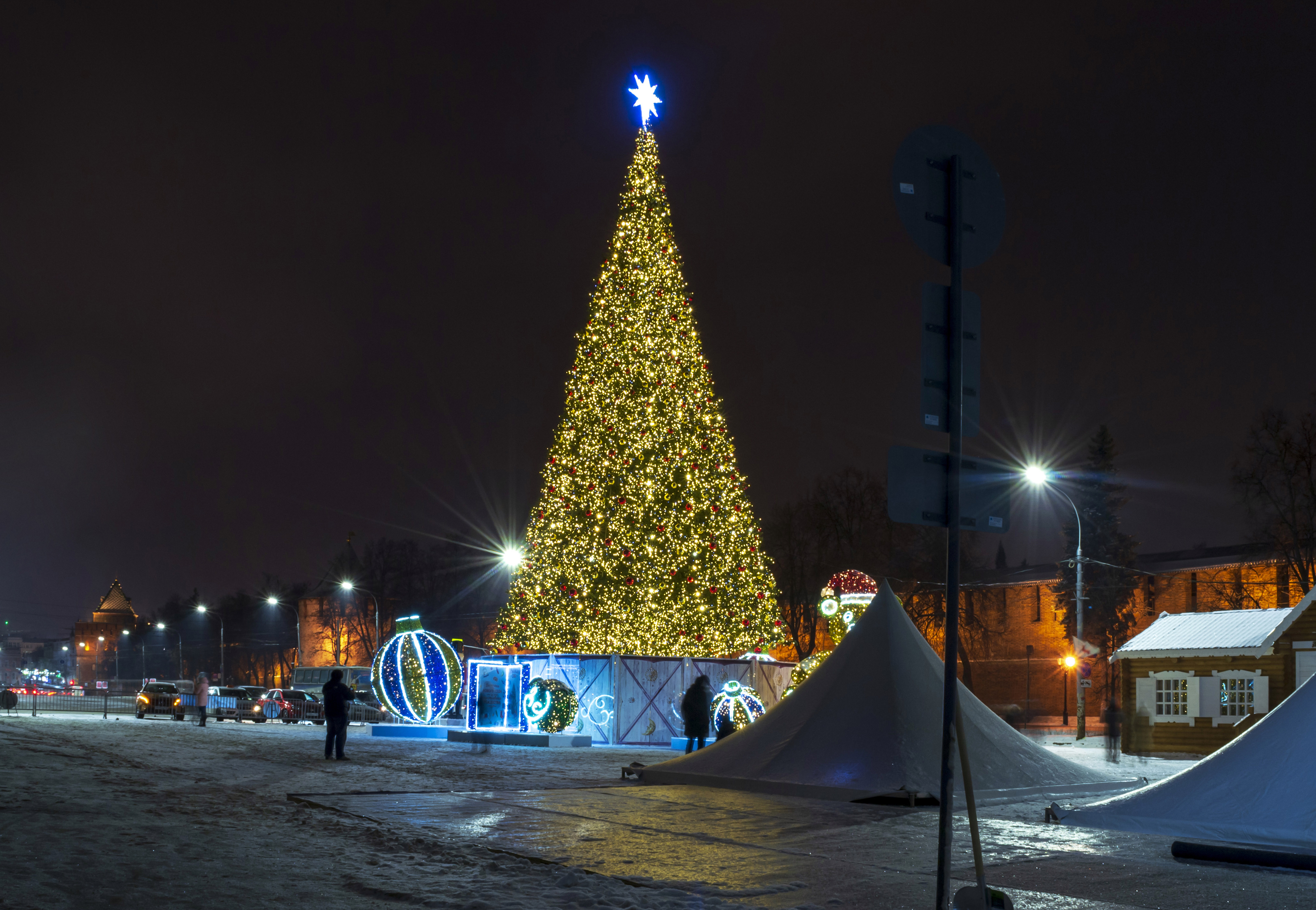
New Year tree on the square

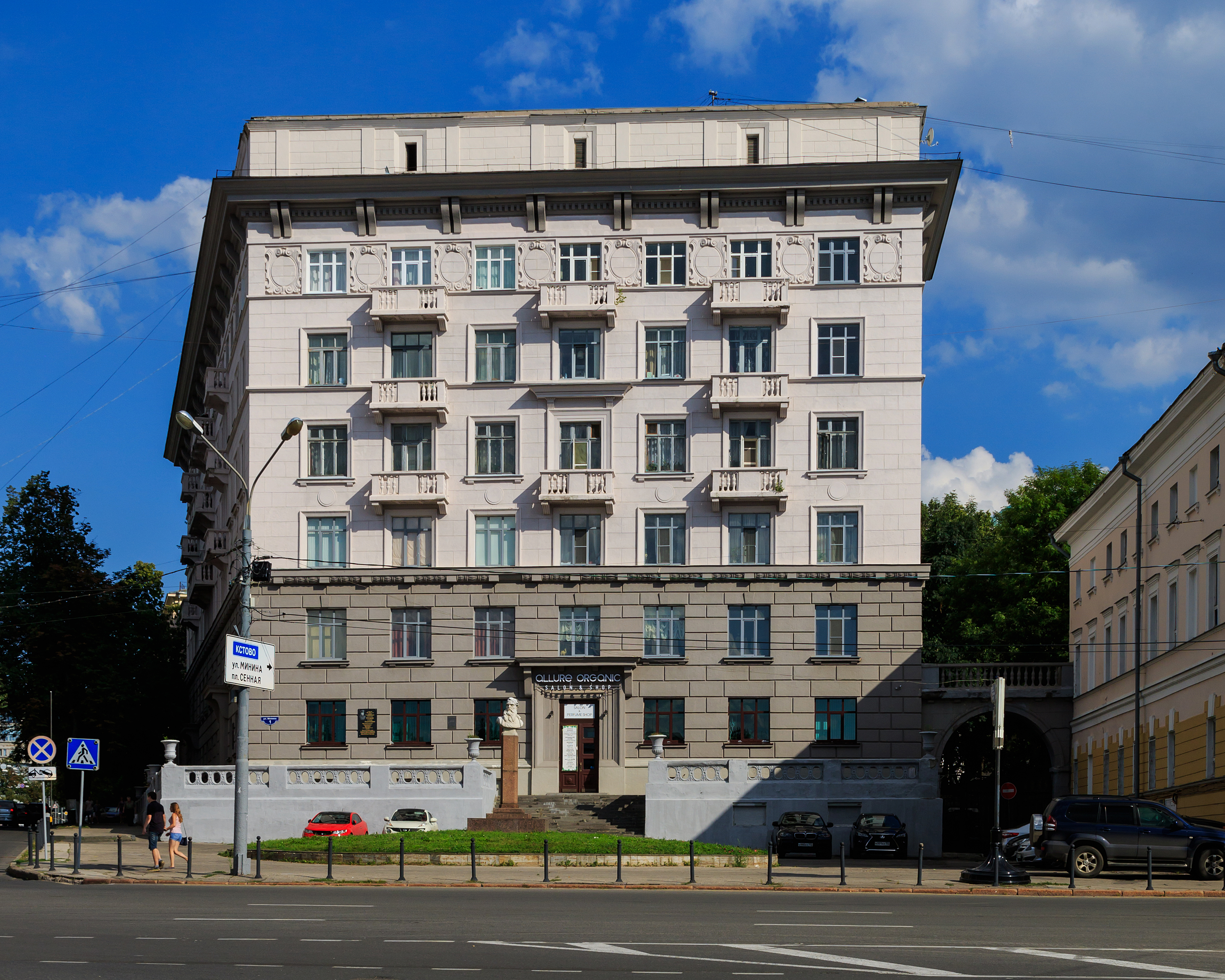
The "First" house

== Geography ==
The square has the form of a ladle: a strip of width 60 meters and a length of 550 meters along the Kremlin from St. George's Tower to the Pantry Tower, with an extension – a radius of 120–150 meters around Dmitrovskaya (Demetrius) Tower. From the ends of the square go Zelensky descent (south-western end) and St. George descent (northeastern end). From the semicircle of the square five streets radially depart: Pozharsky, Bolshaya Pokrovskaya, Alekseevskaya, Varvarskaya and Ulyanov.

== Main sights ==
Around the square are the following buildings and structures (counter-clockwise): the Kremlin, the Palace of Labor, the Exhibition Hall, the "Alekseevsky ryad" shopping complex, the first building of the Minin University, the building of the State University and the choir college, Gymnasium No. 1, the second building of the Minin University, residential buildings on the Minin street, the first building of the Medical Academy.

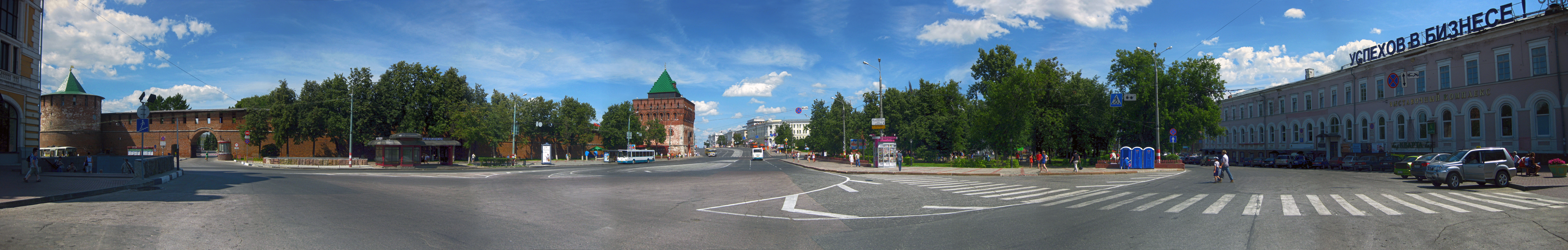
General view of the Minin and Pozharsky Square

=== The Minin Monument ===
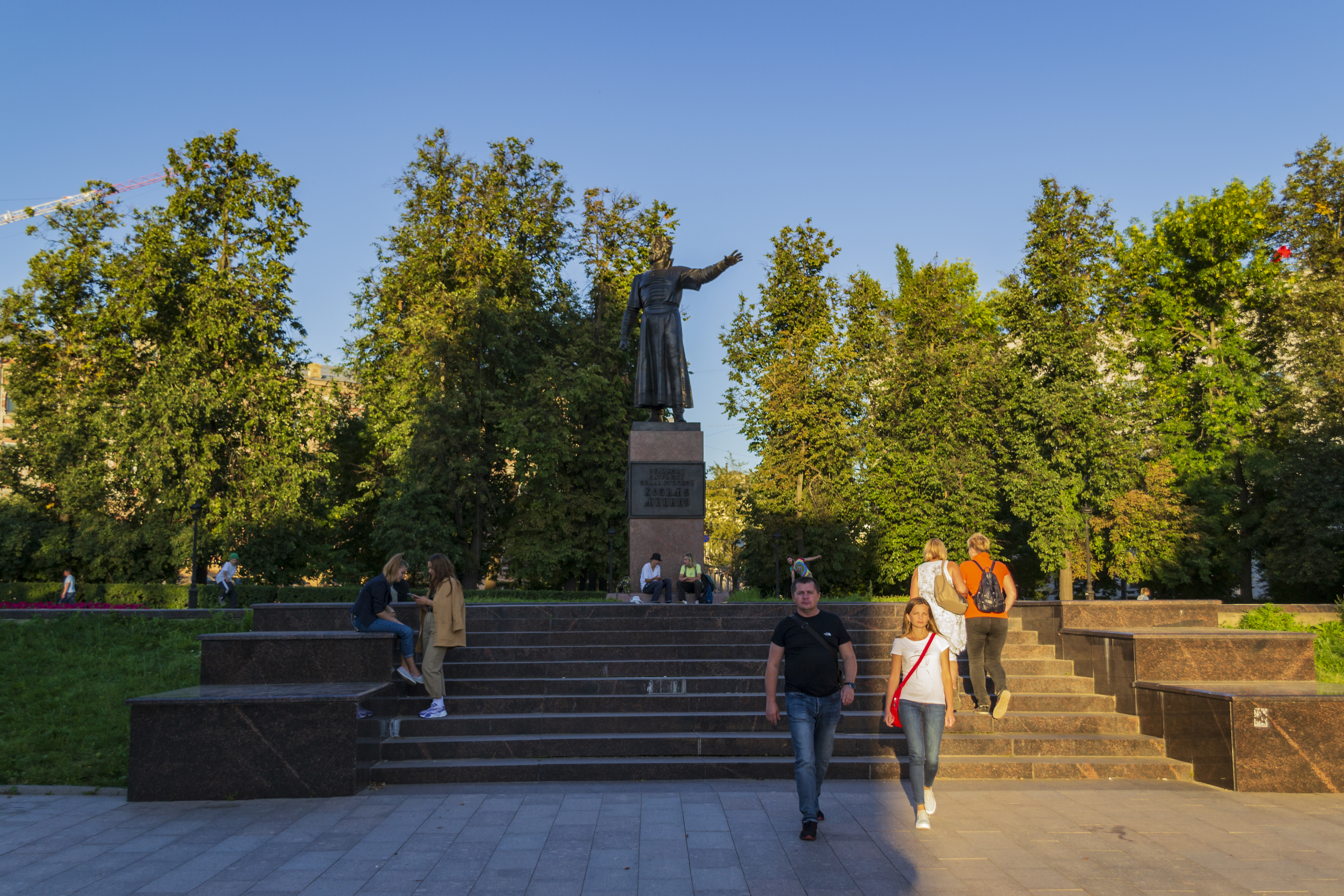
The current Minin monument

Located in the center of the square in front of Dmitrovskaya Tower.

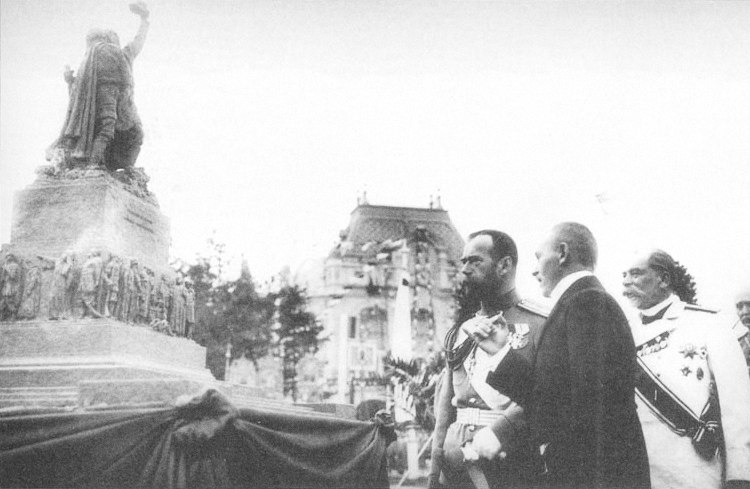
Nicholas II at the presentation of the laying of the monument to Minin and Pozharsky on the Annunciation Square.

The idea to erect a monument to Kuzma Minin and Prince Pozharsky on Annunciation Square was close to realization in the beginning of the 20th century. In 1912, the competition was won by a sketch of the monument of sculptor Vladimir Simonov, who received the right to create a sculpture. 17 May 1913, in the presence of Emperor Nicholas II, who visited the city in connection with the celebration of the Romanov Tercentenary, the construction of a monument began. But the World War I prevented the installation of the monument, and in 1918 the bolsheviks decided to destroy the monument being erected. Granite pedestal was used for other purposes, the fate of bronze sculpture is unknown.

During the World War II, the city's leadership decided to recall pre-Soviet history to raise the patriotic spirit of the people. In Gorky was announced a competition of sketches of the monument to Minin. Many sculptors took part in the competition, but the sculptor Alexander Kolobov, who had his own workshop, began working on the monument before the rest, while the rest of the artists still made sketches. As a result, the monument to Minin was made within a few months. It was inaugurated on 7 November 1943 and the square was renamed in honor of Minin and Pozharsky.

The figure of Minin was made of a short-lived material – concrete. It was painted in a bronze color. In the summer of 1985, a monument requiring repair or replacement was dismantled and sent to Balakhna, the homeland of the hero. On 1 June 1989, a new monument was erected by sculptor Oleg Komov. The old monument, the same year, was installed on the Soviet Square in Balakhna.

=== The Chkalov monument ===
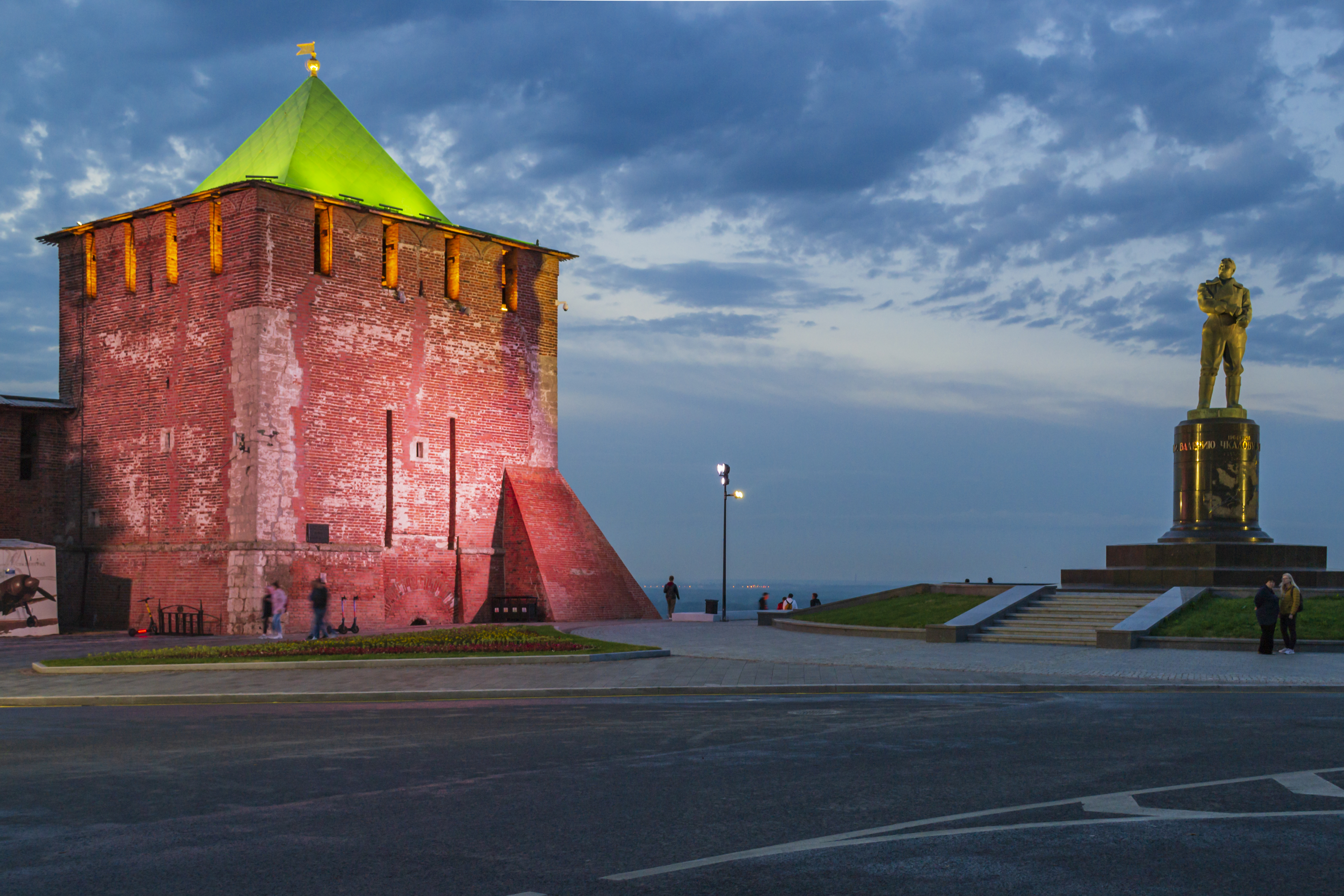
The Chkalov Monument and St. George Tower of the Kremlin

Located to the right of the St. George's Tower of the Kremlin.

The monument to the test pilot was opened 15 December 1940, on the second anniversary of his death. The author of the sculpture was a friend of Chkalov – Isaak Mendelevi. He was awarded the Stalin Prize for this work. On the pedestal surface contours of the map of the Northern Hemisphere are drawn showing the routes of the Chkalov-Baidukov-Belyakov command to the Far East, across the North Pole to America. The pedestal itself is lined with labradorite.

On the pedestal, the years of the pilot's life and the inscription "To Valery Chkalov to the great pilot of our time" are painted. Below these words, above the map of flights, there are holes from the fastenings – there was an inscription "to the Stalin Falcon", removed during the fight against the Stalin's cult of personality.

=== The City Duma building ===
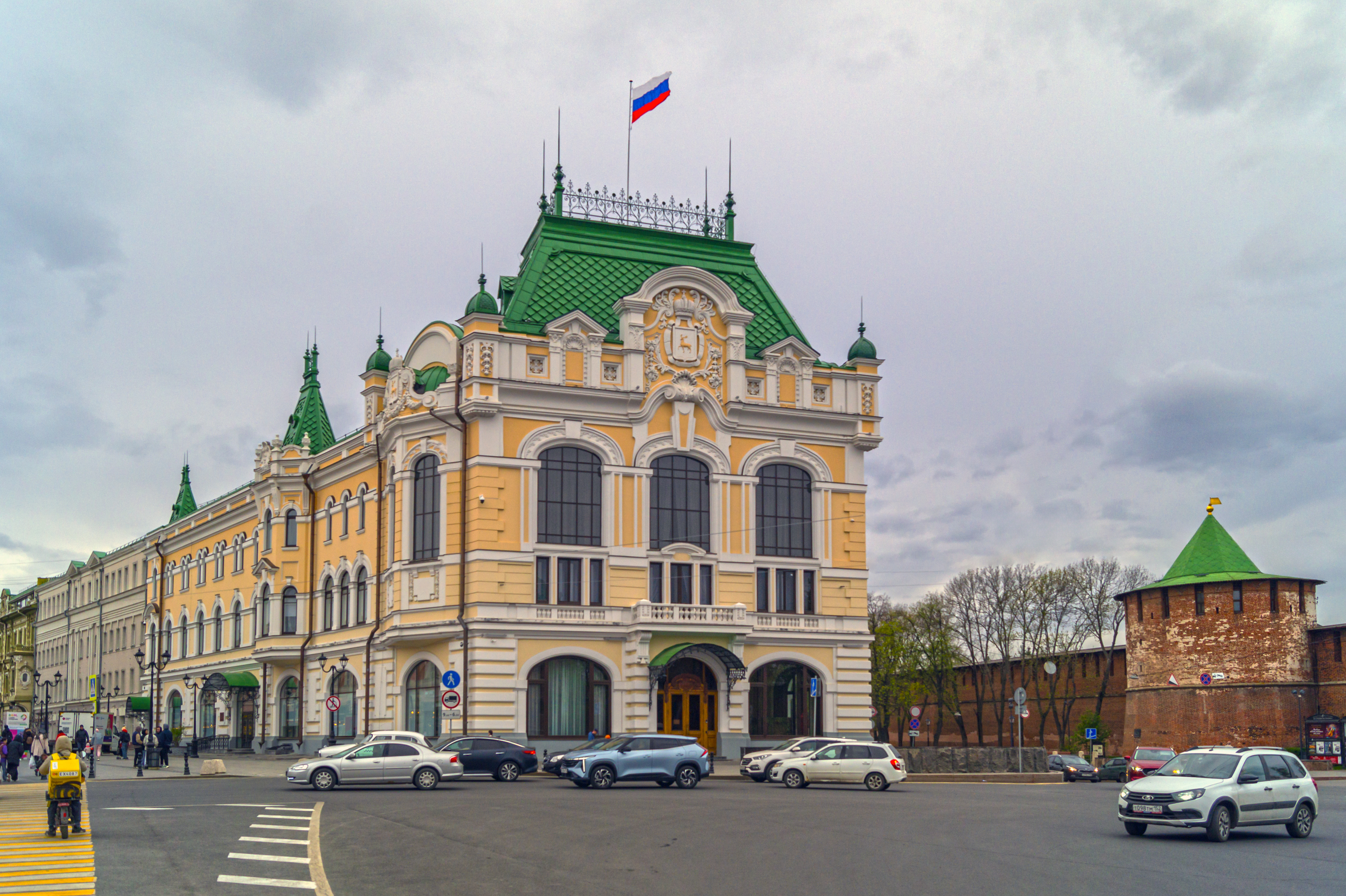
The City Duma building

It is located at the very beginning of the Bolshaya Pokrovskaya street. Bar Association and the Regional Court is located in the building. Earlier here was the House of merchant Bugrov. Then it was rebuilt. After that, the building housed the City Duma until the Russian Revolution. Before the construction of the stone house of Bugrov was the wooden house of the Kordyukovs industrialists. In 1851, he was bought by the founder of the Bugrov firm as Pyotr Bugrov.

The opinion of Nikolai Khramtsovsky, founder of the Nizhny Novgorod regional studies:

"... the best building of the square and even the whole city – there is the house of Bugrov, which also goes outside the square to Pokrovka and the Zelenskaya terrace: it is on three floors with two balconies, one of which is from Pokrovka, the other from the square, – Under the latter there is an entrance. Both balconies and the porch are decorated with bronze bars. The architecture of this house is extremely light and graceful, it reminds the manner of Count Rastrelli. "

The first floor was occupied by trade shops, the second floor Bugrov handed over to the city theater, left without a premises after a fire in the building of the Shakhovskoy Theater.

Son of Peter Bugrov – Alexander demanded the eviction of the theater. In 1862, the building was bought by the provincial leader of the nobility A. Turchaninov, but after his death in 1863 the building housed the theater again. In 1894, on the eve of the All-Russian exhibition, the City Duma was planning to repair the theater building, which suffered from several fires. But the speaker of the City Duma Nikolai Bugrov did not want to see the theater in the house built by his grandfather. He offered 200,000 rubles to build a theater on Bolshaya Pokrovskaya Street. The new theater was built, and the old building was bought by Nikolai Bugrov for 50,000 rubles and donated to the City Duma as a token of gratitude to the merchants for city development for the development and improvement of Nizhny Novgorod. But there were two conditions: first, "that in this building any device of any theater, as well as a commercial establishment selling alcoholic beverages should never be allowed"; secondly, "that the income from the house should go to a special fund for Distribution of the urban poor at the discretion of the City Duma ". The Duma wanted to give the first floor to shops, and on the second floor to place the city library, but in 1898 a fire broke out during the repair, completely destroying the building.

By 1899, architect Vladimir Tseidler had drafted a new building. In 1902, the building was built in rough form and covered with iron roofing. In the years 1903–1904 the interior was decorated. Interior is still the most valuable. In the interior of the meeting room, the elements of the decor of the royal pavilion from the All-Russian Exhibition of 1896 were used. The facades of the building are stylized as "Ancient Rus", there are elements of Art Nouveau.

Nikolai Bugrov provided more than 70% of all expenses for the construction of the new mansion. As a token of gratitude, the house was called "the charitable corps of Nikolai Bugrov", and on 18 April 1904 the Duma decided to mark the house with a memorial plaque, but it appeared only in 1997.

During the February Revolution, this house was occupied by the Provisional Council of Workers Deputies, from the end of 1917 to September 1918 – the Nizhny Novgorod Soviet City Government, then – the Nizhny Novgorod Soviet of Workers and Red Army Deputies. From the end of 1919 until now the house belongs to the trade union bodies, due to which the house was named "The Palace of Labor".

=== The Exhibition Complex ===
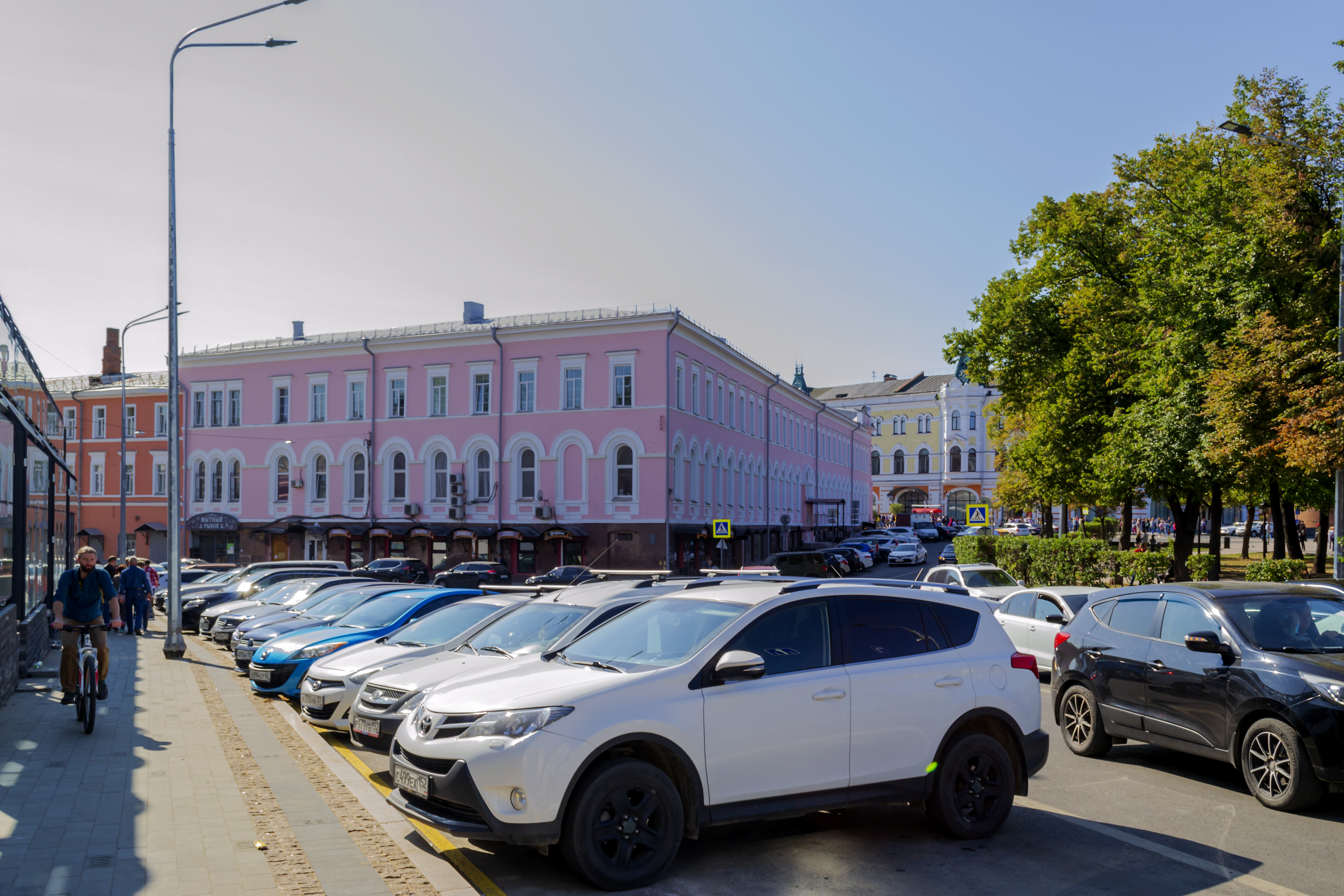
State Exhibition Hall

It is located between Bolshaya Pokrovskaya and Alekseevskaya streets.

In the days of the Russian empire new building public shops was built here instead of demolished wooden stalls placed along the Kremlin wall. Facades of the building was designed by Ivan Efimov. In 1836 the project was approved and the building was built in 1841. Then, for three years, the building was in repair. In the 1850s, local historian Nikolai Khramtsovsky wrote:

"The public house is located on the square and on Alekseevskaya street in three floors, and on Pokrovskaya street – in two: the first and second floors of it are occupied by shops, and in the upper there are living rooms; on the second floor there is a gallery with arches; In the living rooms are placed: the Chamber of the Civil Court, the Construction Commission, the courts of the Uyezd and Zemsky, and the Craftsman's Board."

=== The Fountain ===
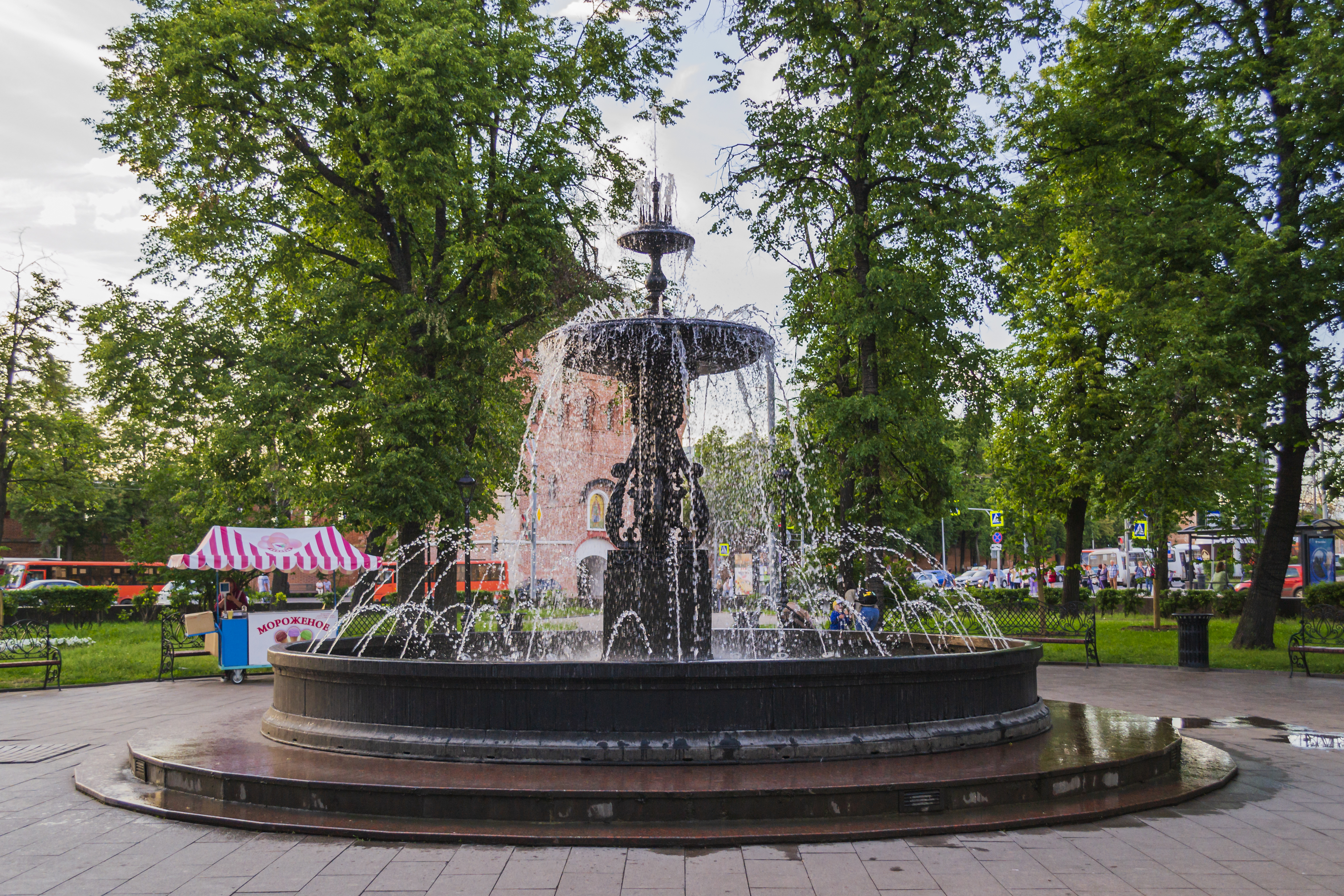
The first city fountain

The fountain on the square began functioning on 1 October 1847.

Lack of water has always been a problem of citizens of the Upper Posad. In winter, they took water from ponds (Sarka, Black Pond, Myronositsky, Pokrovsky) and rivers (Pochayna, Black River, Kovalikha). In the summer, the reservoirs became shallow, silted and polluted with effluents of cesspools and garbage.

All attempts to organize centralized water supply failed, until in 1844 the governor-general, Prince Mikhail Urusov, took up this task. The laying of the waterworks and the fountain took place on 1 July 1846.

The fountain was located to the north of the Annunciation Cathedral. In 1930, after the demolition of the temples, the fountain was moved to a modern place

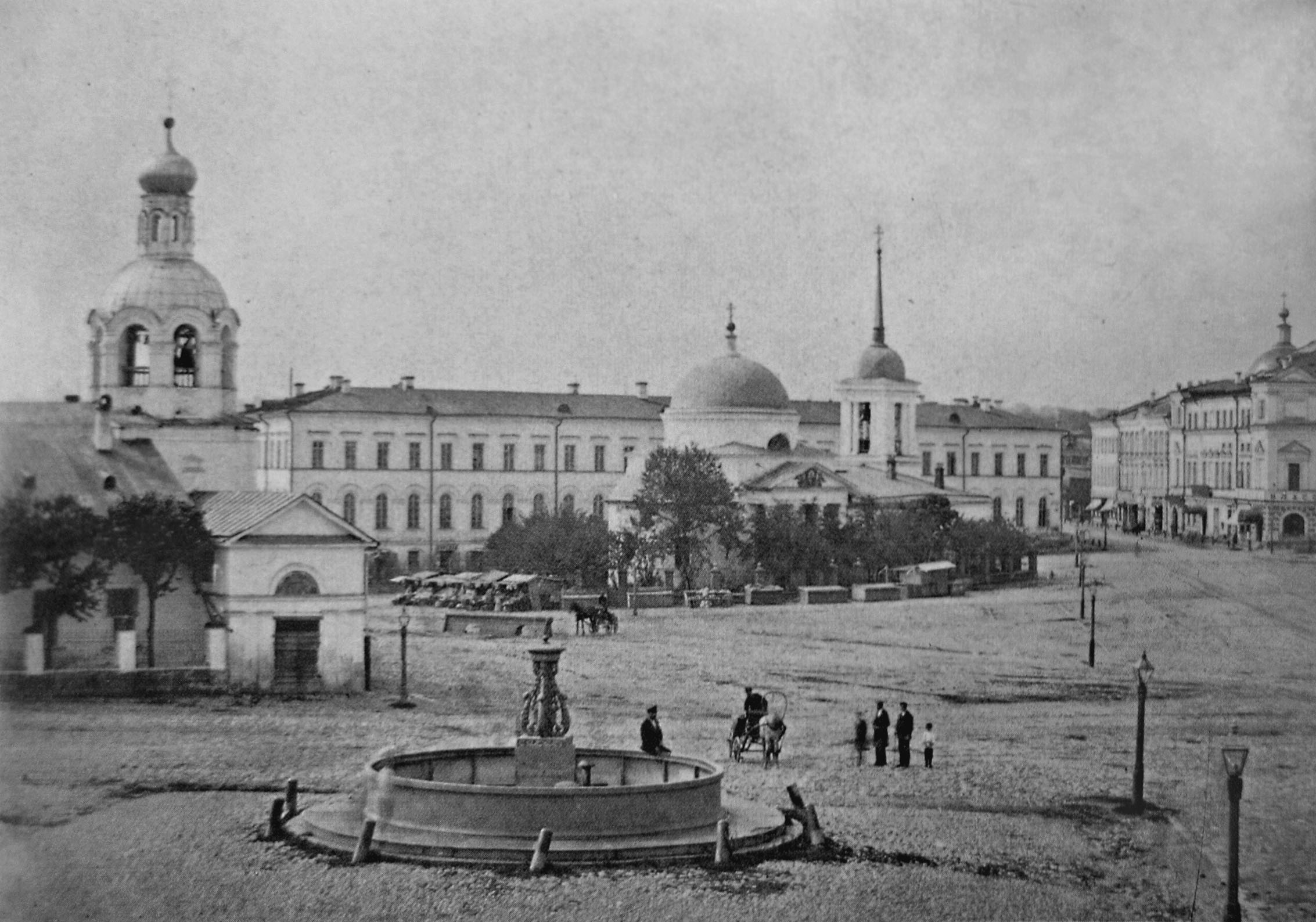
The first fountain on the Blagoveshchenskaya Square

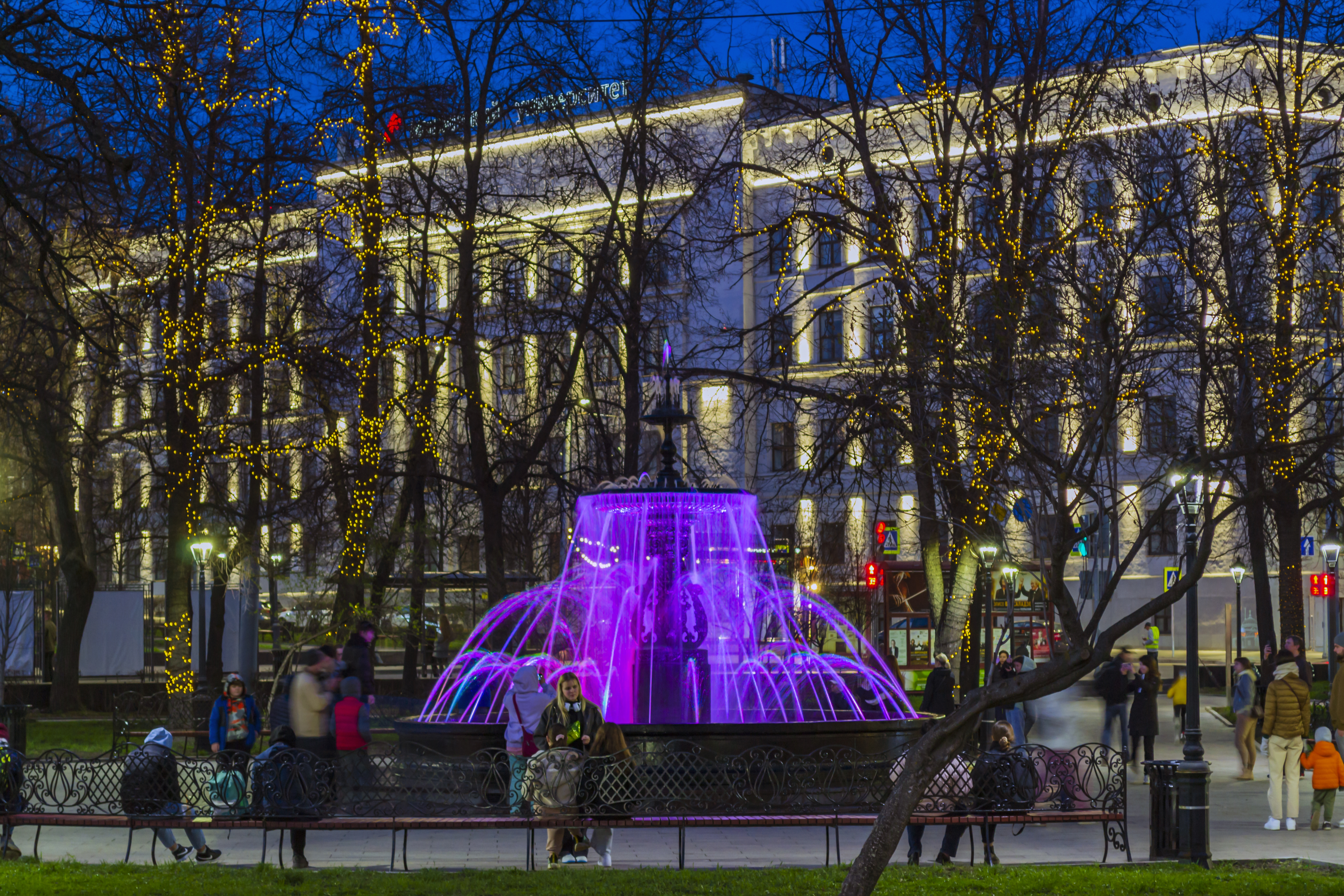
Fountain at night

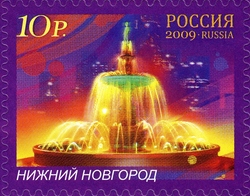
Fountain on the stamp of Russia 2009

=== The Pushkin Museum ===
In memory of Pushkin's stay in Nizhny Novgorod in the building of Gymnasium No. 1, the former hotel where the poet stayed, in 1999 a museum was opened.

== See also ==
- The Kremlin
- Bolshaya Pokrovskaya Street
- Rozhdestvenskaya Street
