= Acteon frearsianus =

Scientific classification
- Kingdom: Animalia
- Phylum: Mollusca
- Class: Gastropoda
- Superfamily: Acteonoidea
- Family: Acteonidae
- Genus: Acteon
- Species: †A. frearsianus

Binomial name
- †Acteon frearsianus d'Orbigny, 1845

Synonyms
- † Acteon frearsiana d'Orbigny, 1845 (incorrect gender agreement)

Extinct species of gastropods

Acteon frearsianus is an extinct species of sea snail, a marine gastropod mollusc in the family Acteonidae.

== Distribution ==
Fossils of this marine species have been found in Russia, Nizhegorodsky Region, the Unzha River near Makarievo settlement.
