= N. I. Lobachevsky State University of Nizhny Novgorod =

Russian university

Lobachevsky State University of Nizhni Novgorod - National Research University
- Нижегородский государственный университет имени Н. И. Лобачевского
- Other names: UNN, Lobachevsky University
- Type: Public
- Established: 1916
- Rector: Oleg Trofimov (acting)
- Students: > 30 000
- Doctoral students: > 1000
- Location: Nizhny Novgorod, Nizhny Novgorod Oblast, Russia; 56°17′58″N 43°59′00″E
- Mascot
- Website: http://www.unn.ru/eng Building details
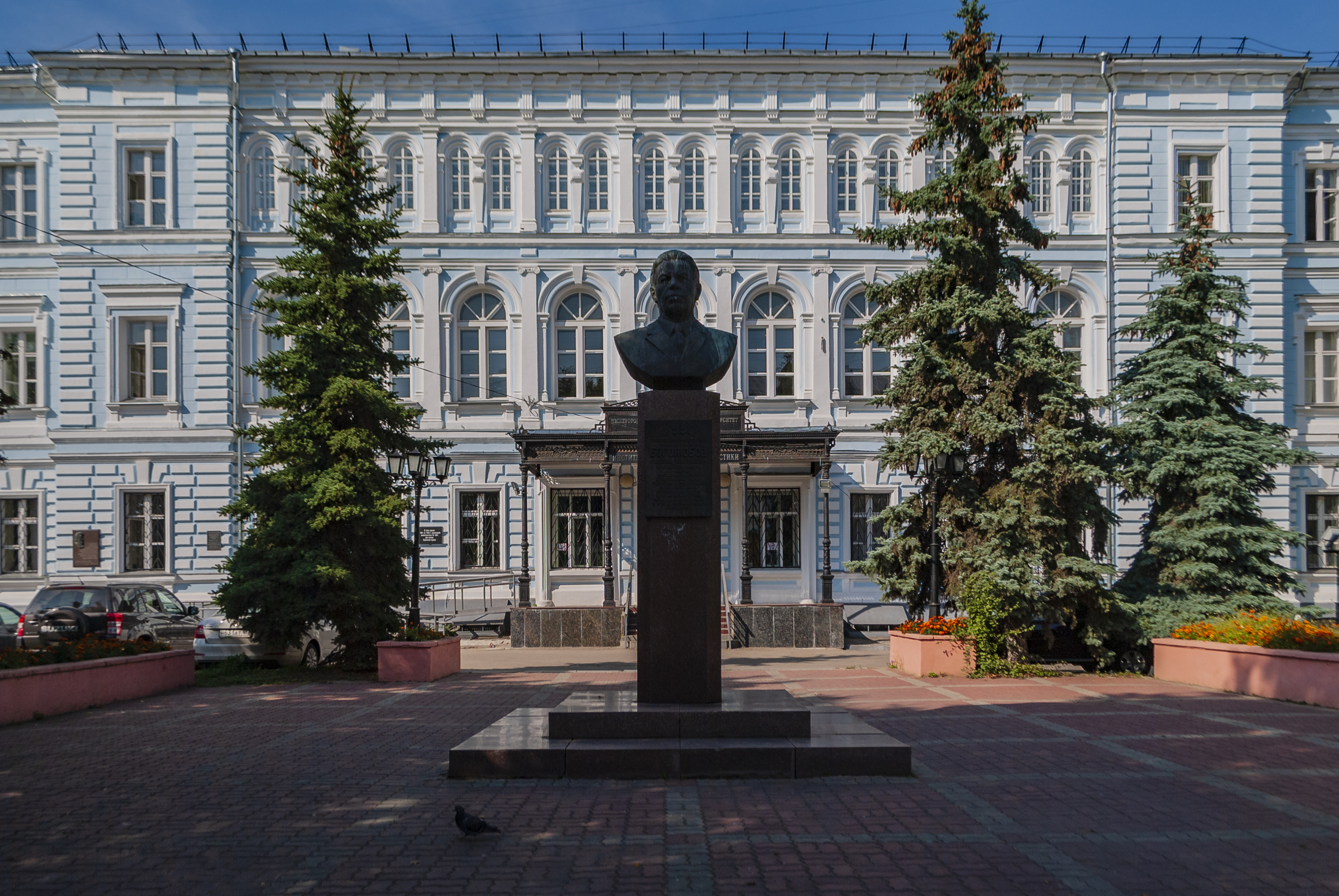
- Philology and Finance Faculty on Bolshaya Pokrovskaya Street

University rankings

Global – Overall
- USNWR Global: 1,455 (2023)

Regional – Overall
- QS Emerging Europe and Central Asia: 89 (2022)

The National Research State University of Nizhny Novgorod named after N.I. Lobachevsky, (Russian: Нижегородский национа́льный иссле́довательский госуда́рственный университе́т имени Н.И. Лобачевского), also known as Lobachevsky University, is a public research university in Nizhny Novgorod, Russia, and one of the biggest classical universities of the country. The university is ranked 1,455th in the world in the U.S. News & World Report Best Global Universities 2022–2023.

The university was established on January 17 (31), 1916 as Nizhny Novgorod People's University. From 1932 to 1990 it had the name of Gorky State University. In 2009, it was granted the status of a National Research University.

The university comprises 15 faculties and educational institutes, 5 research institutes, and 4 regional branches. As of 2023, the university had about 30,000 students (including international students), over 1,000 postgraduate and doctoral students, 1,200 associate and assistant professors, and 400 professors.

== History ==
The university was originally opened on 17 (31) January 1916 as one of the three People's Universities of Russia, belonging to the system of "free" universities. It was the first institution of higher education for Nizhny Novgorod. In 1918, the Emperor Nicholas II Polytechnic Institute of Warsaw was evacuated to Nizhny Novgorod. After the merger of the People's University with that institute and with the Higher Agricultural Courses, it became the first institution in Soviet Russia to acquire the status of a state university.

In 1921, the number of faculties was reduced considerably. On 4 May 1921, the Soviet government issued a resolution that abolished all history and philology faculties. Instead of them, social science faculties were organized. This resolution also affected the Nizhny Novgorod University. In 1922, the number of teaching staff decreased from 239 to 156.

On 14 April 1930, the Soviet government resolved to dissolve a number of higher education institutions, including the Nizhny Novgorod State University. Several of the university faculties were transformed into 6 institutes:

- Mechanical Engineering Institute (later, in 1934, it became part of the Gorky Industrial Institute)
- Chemical Technology Institute (later, in 1934, it became part of the Gorky Industrial Institute)
- Pedagogical Faculty (it was transformed into the Pedagogical Institute in 1930)
- Faculty of Agronomy (it was transformed into the Agricultural Institute in 1930)
- Faculty of Architecture and Civil Engineering (it was transformed into the Civil Engineering Institute in 1930)
- Faculty of Medicine (it was transformed into the Medical Institute in 1930).

However, a year later, on 11 November 1931 the university was re-established with three faculties: Physics & Mathematics, Biology and Chemistry. It occupied the building of the former theological seminary in the Minin and Pozharsky Square. By 1932, the following divisions were functioning at the university: Physics, Mechanics, Zoology, Botany, Chemistry and Mathematics.

In 1938, entrance exams were instituted and, for the first time, Gorky State University held its first competitive admission of first-year students. On 20 March 1956, Gorky State University was named after N.I. Lobachevsky by the decree of the Presidium of the USSR Supreme Soviet. In November 1990, following the return of the city's original name (from 1932 to 1990 it was known as the city of Gorky), the university was renamed into Lobachevsky State University of Nizhny Novgorod.

Apart from its educational role, Lobachevsky University is also actively engaged in research and development in many areas of national importance. In 1932, the Physics and Technology Research Institute was incorporated into the university. It is still part of UNN and cooperates closely with Roscosmos and other public and private organisations. In 1944, the Research Institute of Chemistry was established, which contributed to the development of the national chemical and defence industry. In 1956, the Radiophysics Research Institute was established at the university. In 1969, it was awarded the Order of the Red Banner of Labour for its achievements in radiophysics, radio engineering and astronomy. In 1974, the Research Institute of Mechanics was opened. In 2012, the Living Systems Research Institute was launched, and in 2016 it was transformed into the Research Institute of Neuroscience. This unit focuses on the study of brain activity.

In 2014, the university launched its supercomputer named Lobachevsky. The peak performance of Lobachevsky is 570 Tflops: this makes it the fourth most powerful supercomputer in Russian universities and brings it to the list of the most powerful supercomputers in the world.

As a participant in the Federal Target Programme for the Development of the Medical and Pharmaceutical Industry, the university established the Center for Innovation Development of Medical Instrumentation in 2017.

Roman Strongin (Стронгин Роман Григорьевич), the rector of the N. I. Lobachevsky State University of Nizhny Novgorod has signed a letter of support for the Russian invasion of Ukraine.

== Rankings ==
According to QS World University Rankings 2023, Lobachevsky University is in the top 1200 of the world's best universities, as well as in the top 550 in Mathematics and Physics. Lobachevsky University is among the top 1,500 universities in the world according to Times Higher Education World University Rankings 2023 and is also listed in THE subject rankings in physics, Engineering, life sciences and computer science. UNN is ranked among the top 1000 universities in the world by THE Impact Rankings 2022, which tracks the progress of universities on 17 UN Sustainable Development Goals (SDGs). The university is ranked 1,455th in the world (18th for Russia) in the U.S. News & World Report Best Global Universities 2022–2023, and also ranks 583rd in this ranking for physics. UNN ranks 645th among the world universities in the international Round University Ranking 2023. In the national rankings, in 2022 Lobachevsky University ranked 25-26th in Russia according to Interfax, 35nd according to RAEX Top-100 (Expert RA) and 19th-21nd according to the Three Missions University Ranking (within the 501-550 range in the world). Also, in the SuperJob 2023 ranking of the best Russian universities in terms of graduate salaries, UNN was ranked 9th in IT, 8th in Economics and Finance, and 8th in Law.

== Research and achievements ==
=== 2016 ===
In October 2016, university representatives reported the development of unique ceramic materials for spacecraft which are capable of withstanding high temperatures and radiation, thus enabling interplanetary travel.

Lobachevsky University scientists are also implementing the "Cyberheart" and "Cybertrainer" projects. The "Cyberheart" project focuses on the development of an intelligent software system for the acquisition, storage and analysis of cardiac data. The system includes a software package that enables large-scale calculations that accurately reproduce the dynamic processes of the heart. At the same time, the system is capable of obtaining reliable real-time data on human cardiac activity, as well as simulating various effects (electrical, mechanical, optical, etc.) and testing the effectiveness of medicines. The system is capable of detecting cardiac diseases using the existing database. The "Cyberheart" has a graphical support system for cardiology data analysis, a system that automatically generates procedures for possible treatment of specific patients, and an ECG system that sends the results over a wireless network.

The "Cybertrainer" EOS (Electromyographic Optical System) is designed to monitor, visualize and adjust the activity of a person's muscles. The system consists of a suit with embedded myo-sensors. During exercise, the sensor system captures information about the load of particular muscles and projects the image onto augmented reality glasses. A tactile stimulation system for individual muscles can adjust the movements in accordance with the pre-recorded standard. When using the "Cybertrainer" suit, the athlete spends less time to achieve the goal, and the likelihood of eventual injury is reduced. Besides, the "Cybertariner" system can monitor the processes of recovery of injured muscles and prevent new injuries. The software helps to adjust the maximum permissible level of strain for each muscle. When this level is reached, a system of vibration sensors gives a signal to the user about excessive strain.

=== 2018 ===
Chemists at Lobachevsky University have developed a new substance for bone implants. The work started in 2018 in collaboration with scientists from Nanyang Technological University (Singapore) and was completed in 2021. The new substance for bone implants is fluorapatite Ca_{5}(PO_{4})_{3}F in which calcium atoms are partially replaced with bismuth and sodium atoms. The element bismuth in the compound provides an antibacterial effect and helps to fight infections that threaten the patient's body in the post-operative period. Sodium is responsible for the biocompatibility of the substance and helps it to integrate more actively into the bone. The composition is based on a substance consisting of calcium, phosphorus, oxygen and fluorine and is a mineral that replicates the structure and composition of human bone tissue.

=== 2020 ===
The team of Lobachevsky University for the first time won the finals of the International Collegiate Programming Championship (ICPC). The university team became the champion among 119 teams from all over the world and won the cup and the gold medal of the international IT competition, where young programmers of the world compete every year. A total of around 59,000 students from 3,406 universities in 104 countries took part in the championship. The ICPC finals were held in Russia.

=== 2022 ===
A joint team of UNN chemists and biophysicists develops dual-action antitumour drugs that combine the most effective approaches to cancer therapy: photodynamic therapy and chemotherapy.

Scientists at Lobachevsky University have completed testing a new method of electro-optical detection of terahertz radiation pulses, which allows seeing through opaque materials and can be used for non-destructive testing of materials and for scanning luggage at airports.

Researchers from the UNN Institute of Chemistry, together with colleagues from the Mendeleev Russian University of Chemistry and Technology and the Tula-TECH Research and Education Center, developed a system for automated synthesis of metal nanoparticles.

== Structure ==
=== Faculties and educational institutes ===
- Institute of Biology and Biomedicine
- Institute of Clinical Medicine
- Faculty of Chemistry
- Institute of International Relations and World History
- Faculty of Radiophysics
- Faculty of Physics
- Institute of Information Technology, Mathematics and Mechanics
- Institute of Economics
- Institute of Philology and Journalism
- Advanced School of General and Applied Physics
- Faculty of Law
- Faculty of Social Sciences
- Faculty of Physical Education and Sports
- Institute of Postgraduate and Doctoral Studies
- Higher School of Arts and Design

=== Research institutes ===
- Physics and Technology Research Institute
- Research Institute of Chemistry
- Research Institute of Radiophysics
- Research Institute of Mechanics
- Research Institute of Neuroscience

=== Other units ===
- Minor Academy of Public Administration
- Fundamental Library
- Science Park "Lobachevsky Lab"
- Research and Education Center "Physics of Solid-State Nanostructures"
- Psychological Clinic
- Military Training Center
- Center for Educational Programs for Foreign Nationals
- Faculty for Professional Development and Retraining
- University branch in Arzamas
- University branch in Balakhna
- University branch in Dzerzhinsk
- University branch in Pavlovo

== Notable alumni ==
- Olga Alexandrovna Sadovskaya, lawyer and human rights activist
- Valery Fokin, notable organic chemist and professor at the University of Southern California

== See also ==
- List of modern universities in Europe (1801–1945)
- List of institutions of higher learning in Russia
