= Bolshaya Pokrovskaya Street =

Main street of Nizhny Novgorod

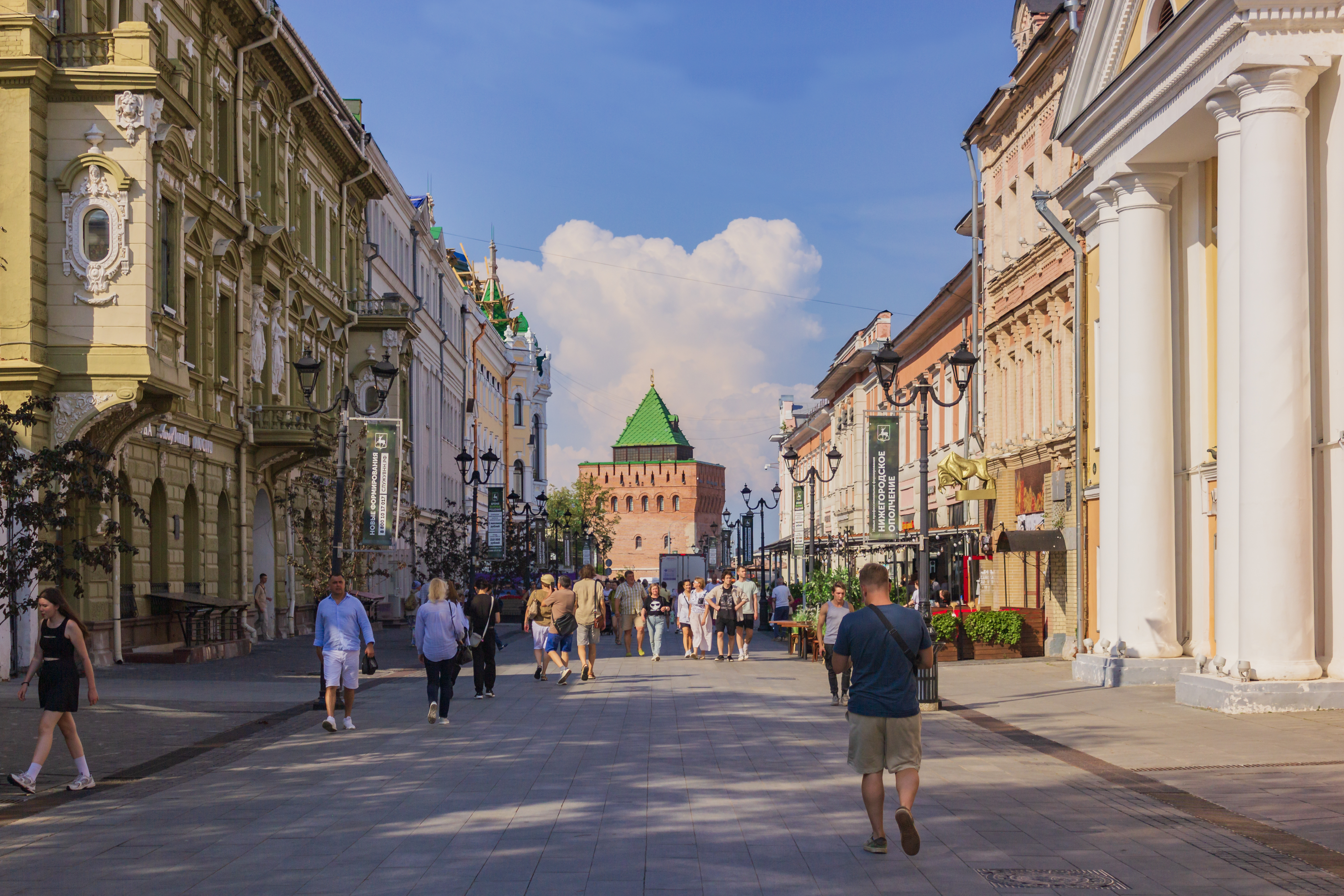
- Bolshaya Pokrovskaya Street in May 2022
- Interactive map of Bolshaya Pokrovskaya Street
- Native name: Большая Покровская (Russian)
- Former name: Sverdlov Street (Soviet period)
- Location: Nizhny Novgorod, Russia
- Postal code: 603005
- Nearest Nizhny Novgorod Metro station: Gorkovskaya
- Coordinates: 56°19′20″N 44°00′02″E

Bolshaya Pokrovskaya Street (Russian: Большая Покровская улица, lit. 'Greater Intercession Street'; short-name — Pokrovka, Russian: Покровка) is the high street in the historical centre of Nizhny Novgorod and one of its oldest streets. Until 1917 it was considered a street for noblemen. Formed the main street of the city by the end of the 18th century. It is considered an analog of the Arbat in Moscow or 6-7 Lines of Vasilyevsky Island in St. Petersburg.

== History ==
=== Russian Empire ===
The street began to form in the Middle Ages. Then its direction was set on the road to Moscow. After the visit of Empress Catherine II, a new regular city plan was developed, providing for a quarterly system. In 1823 - 1824 the bell tower at the church of the Protection of the Holy Virgin (Russian: Церковь Покрова Пресвятой Богородицы) was built.

At the end of the 16th to the beginning of the 19th centuries stone buildings were added to the street. Since then it has become the main street of the city and has become known as the "noble family", because of the location on it of the estate of the generals, princely families, the governor, the vice-governor and other high officials. In 1896 Nicholas Theater was built, the opening of which was timed to coincide with the beginning of the All-Russia Exhibition. On 18 July 1896, it was visited by Emperor Nicholas II.

=== Soviet period ===
After the revolution, the street was renamed and began to bear the name of the revolutionary Yakov Sverdlov and was popularly called "Sverdlovsk". Approximately in 1935, the Church of the Intercession was demolished. Until the 1980s, the street was a road, and in the early 80's it was made pedestrian.

=== Current Russia ===
After the dissolution of the Soviet Union, the street was renamed back to Bolshaya Pokrovskaya. In 2004 the 21st century the street was completely reconstructed.

Historical images

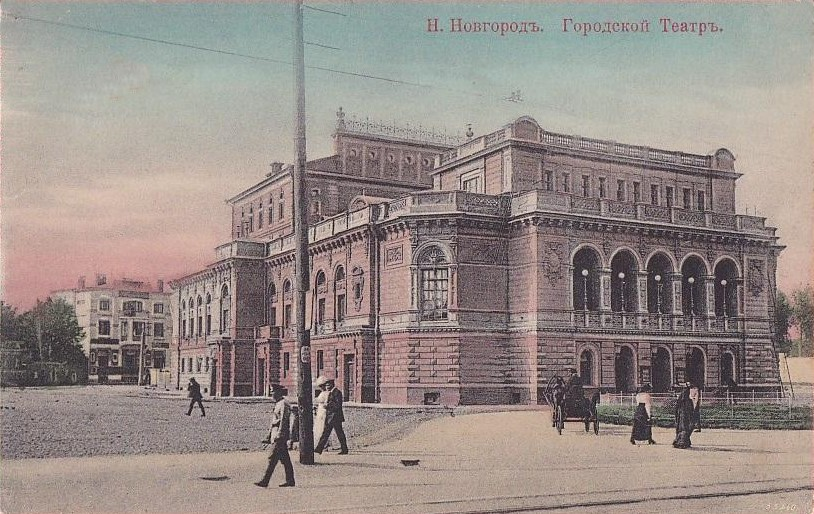
The Dramatic theater. 1880, photo by Andrei Karelin and Ivan Shishkin

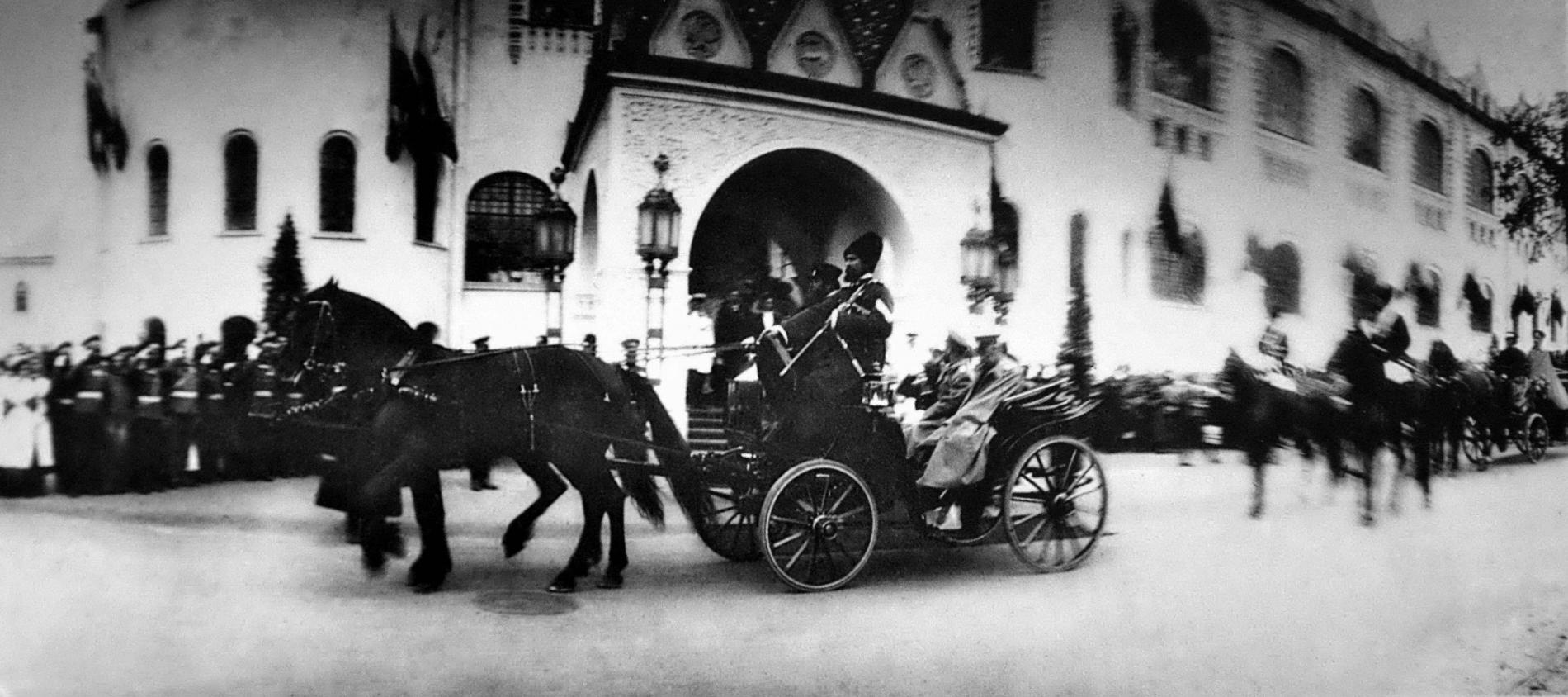
Check out Nicholas II from State Bank, 1896, photo by Maxim Dmitriev

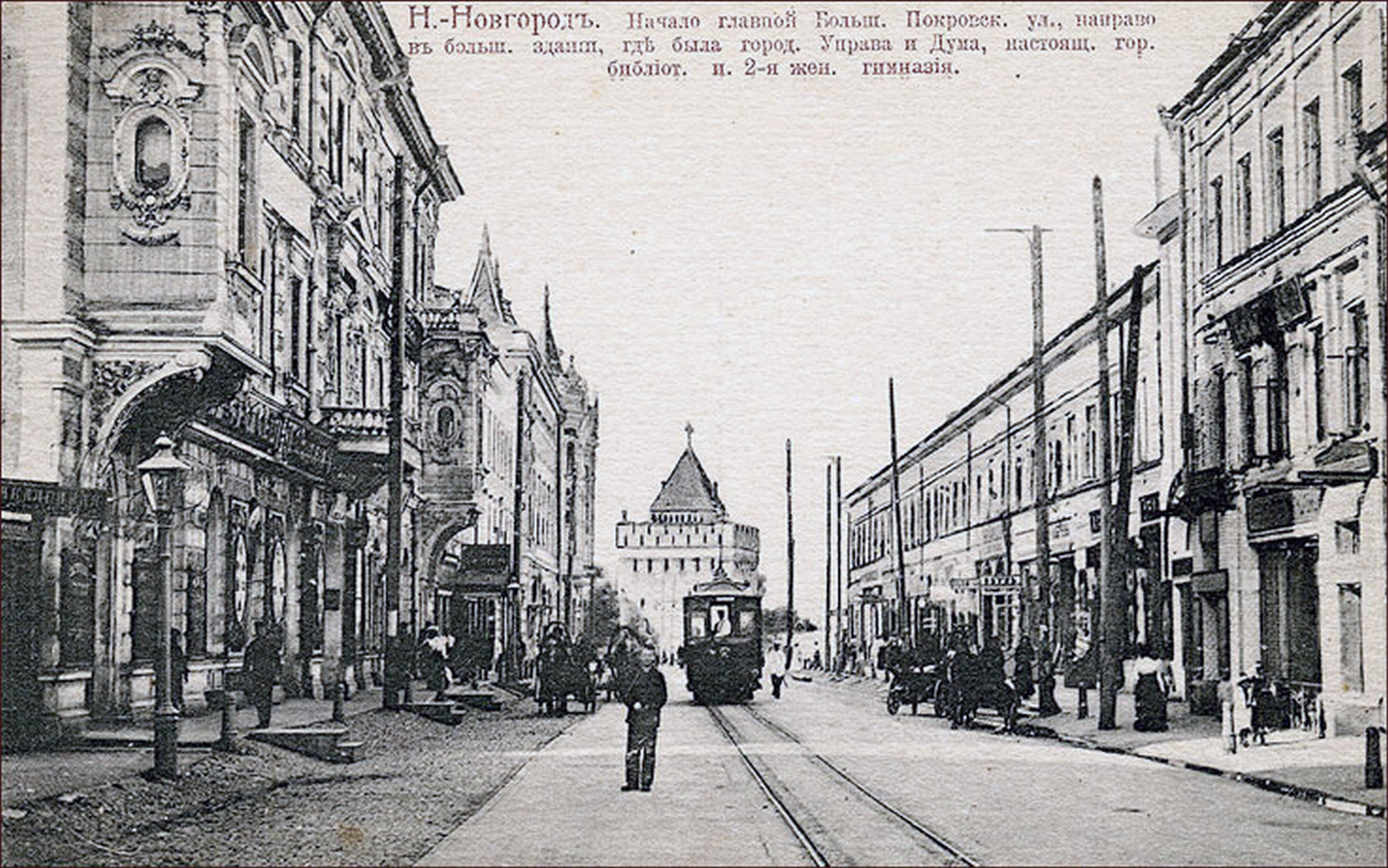
Tram on Bolshaya Pokrovskaya Street, 1902

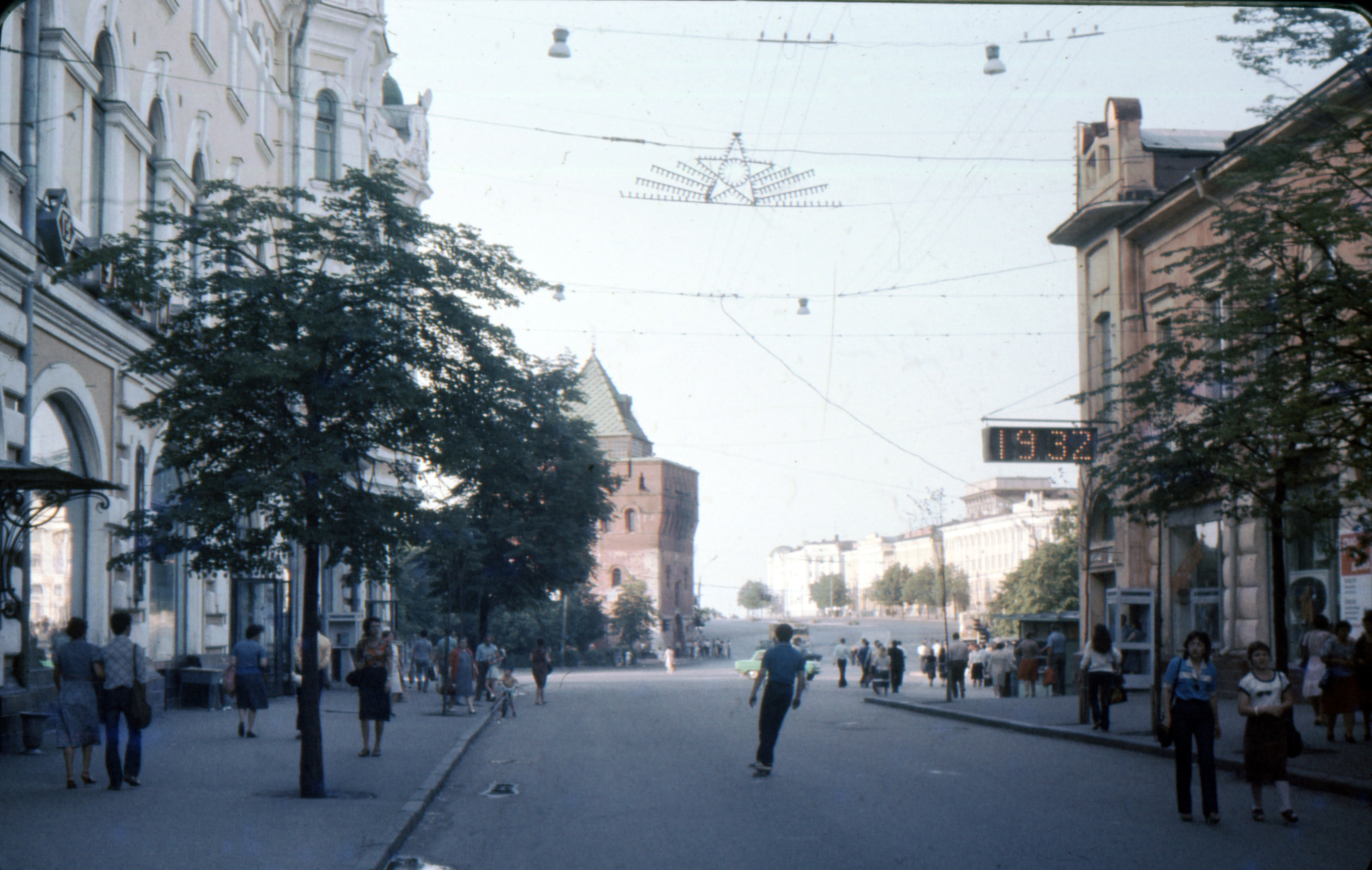
Soviet Union. Sverdlov Street, 1985

== Attractions ==
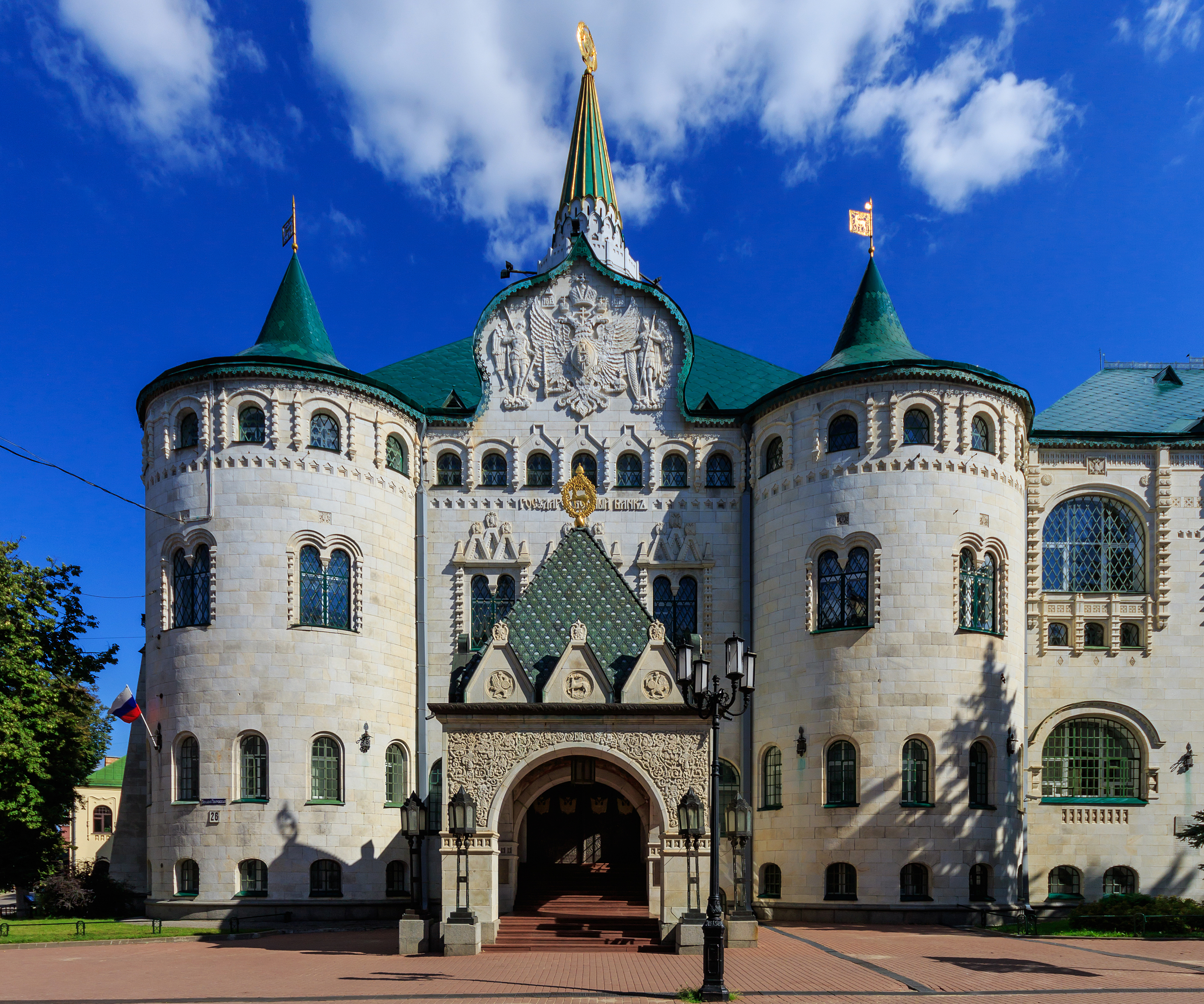
The State Bank

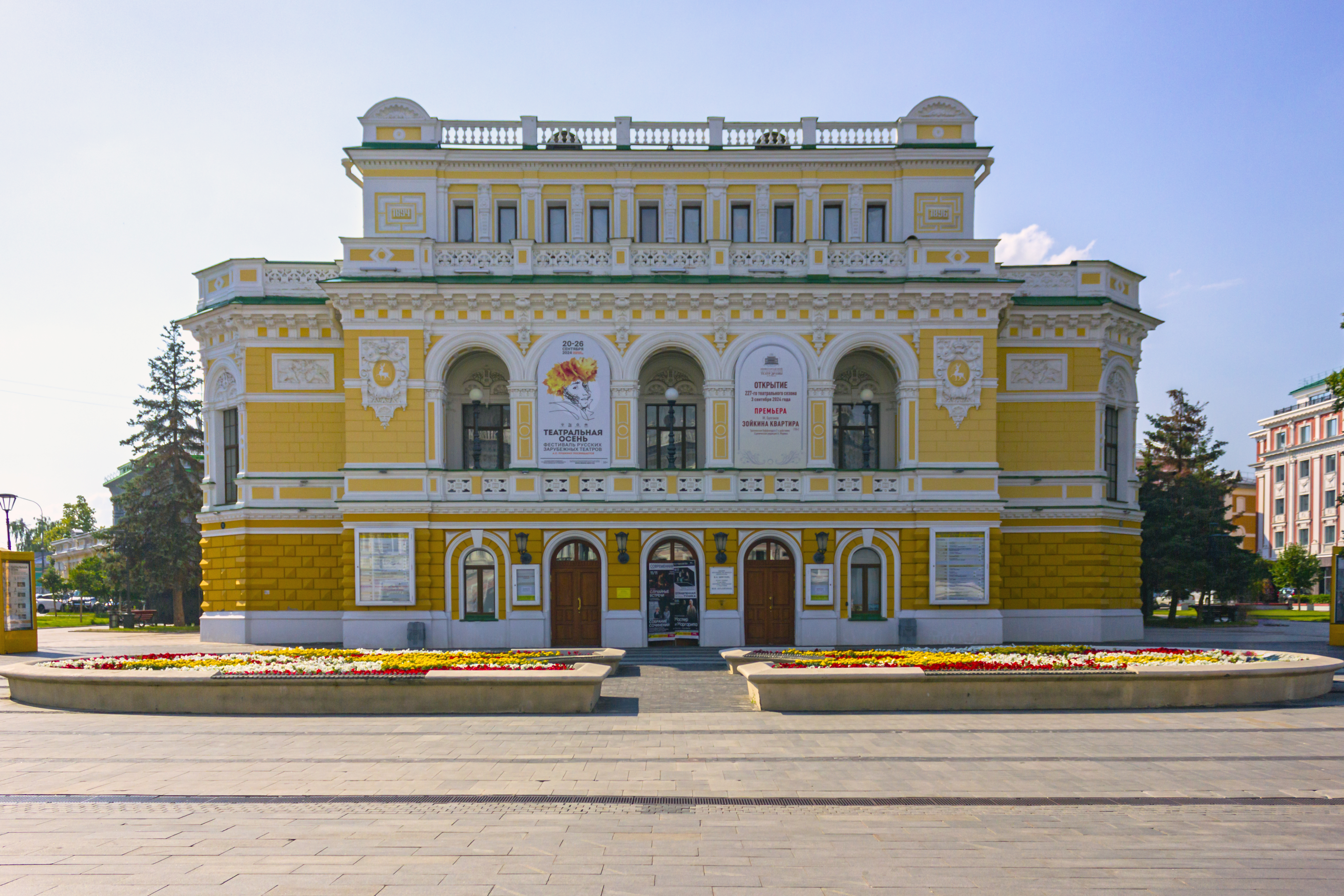
Dramatic Theatre

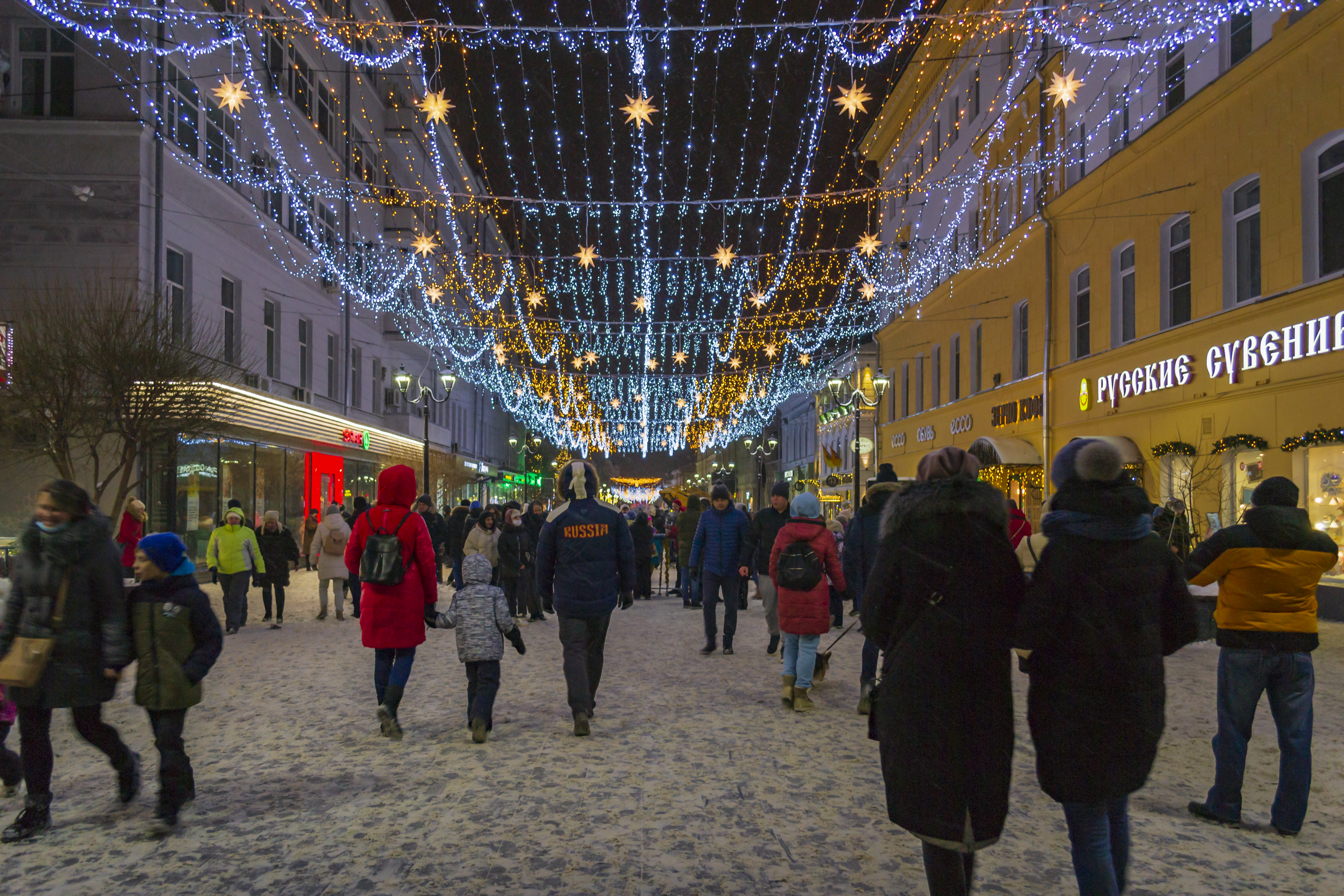
Street at Christmas 2021

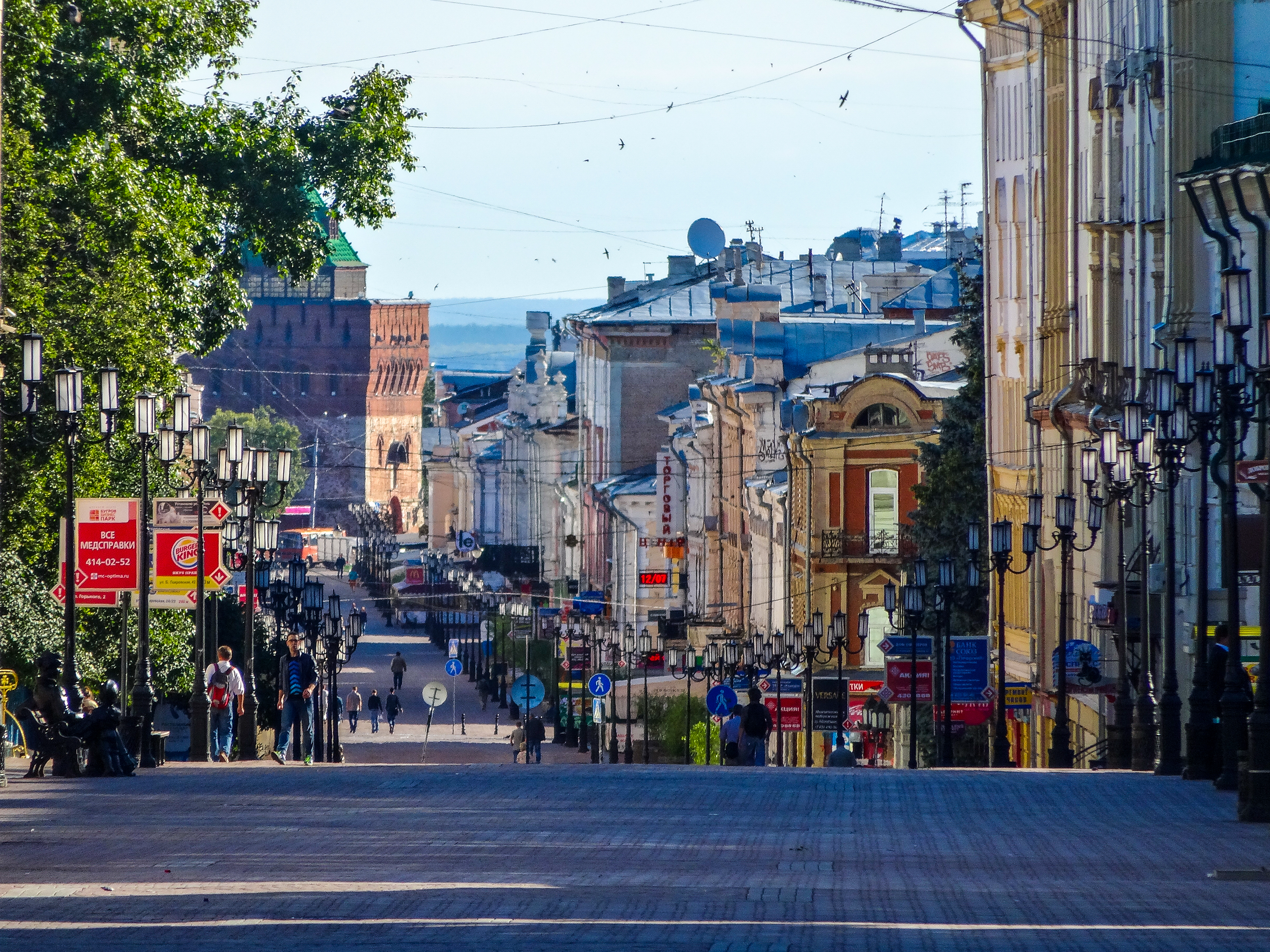
View to Bolshaya Pokrovskaya street towards Kremlin. July 2014

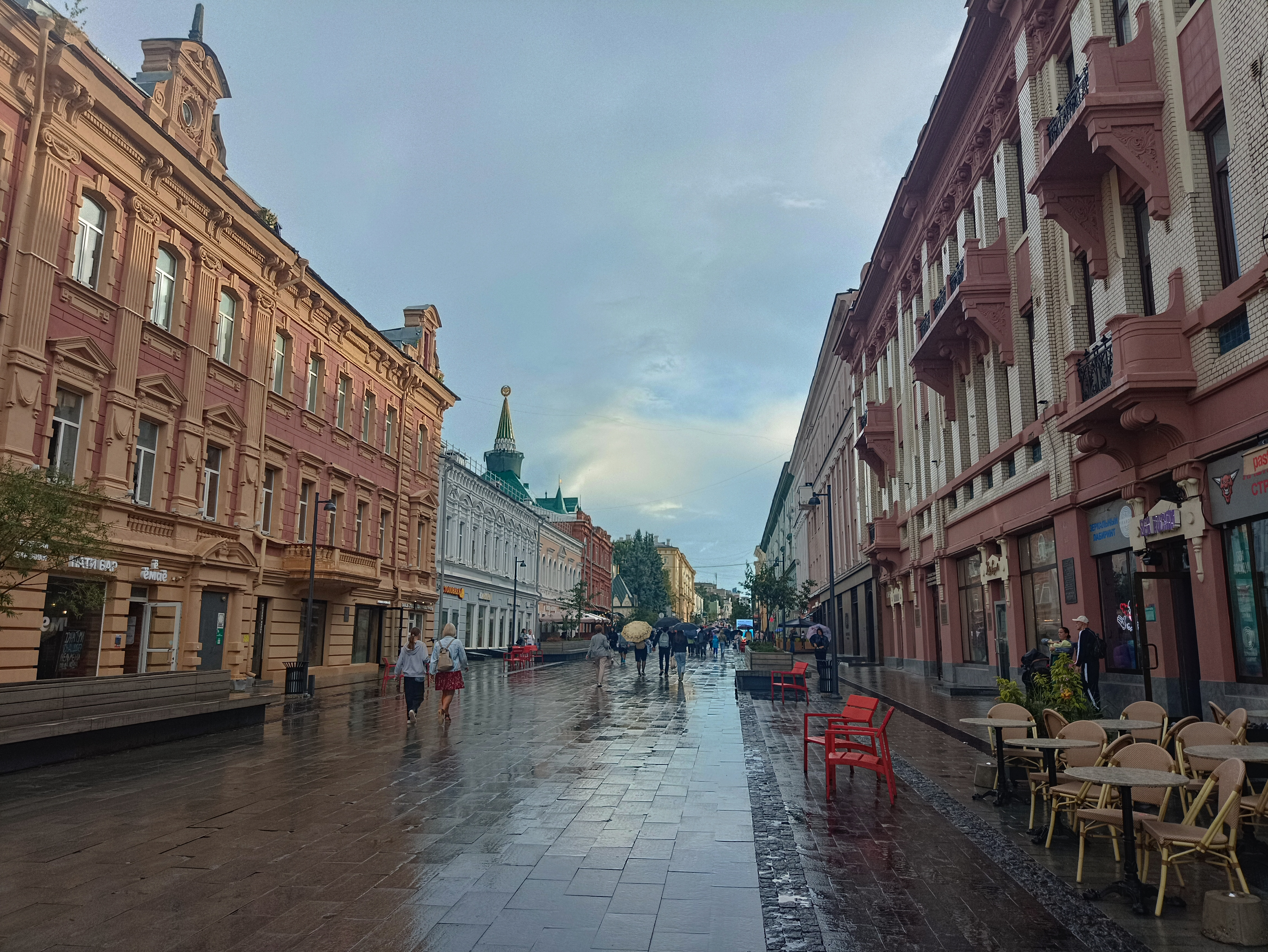
Bolshaya Pokrovskay street during the rain.

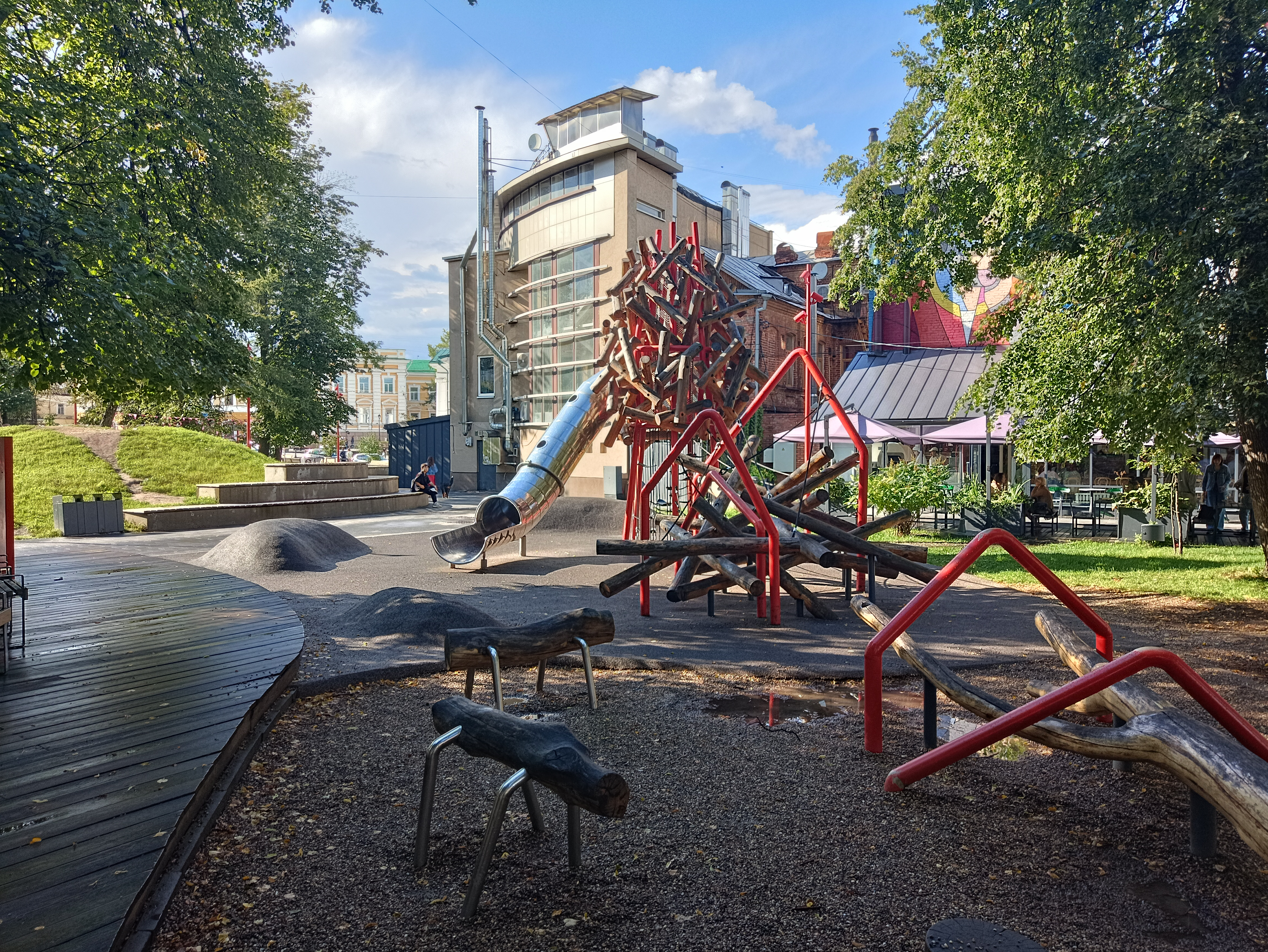
Sverdlova Square in Nizhny Novgorod.

- Educational theater at the Theater School named after Yevgeniy Yevstigneyev;
- The building of philological, financial faculties and the faculty of social sciences of Nizhny Novgorod State University;

== Interesting ==
=== Buskers ===
Every day street musician plays here. They play in different musical styles and repertoires. The attitude of the city police towards street musicians is loyal. Unlike the Moscow Arbat, musicians here are not banished from the street and are not fined. If they do not violate public order.

=== Street artists ===
Near the philological faculty of the UNN, there are various artists and artisans. There's also organized an impromptu exhibition fair of their works. The artists can order portraits, caricatures, and still lifes, and artisans can order a variety of wicker products, pottery, and more.

=== Sculptures ===
From Minin and Pozharsky Square towards Gorky Square:

- Yevgeniy Yevstigneyev - on a bench near the Dramatic Theater
- Nikolay Dobrolyubov
- Nikolay Bogolyubov - near the building of the philological faculty of the UNN
