= Bald and Bankrupt =

English travel vlogger and YouTuber

Benjamin Rich
- Born: Benjamin Rich; Brighton, England
- Other names: Arthur Chichester; Mr. Bald
- Occupations: Travel vlogger; author

YouTube information
- Channel: bald and bankrupt
- Years active: 2018–present
- Genre: Travel vlog
- Subscribers: 4.54 million
- Views: 741 million
- Last updated: 15 Sep 2026

Bald and Bankrupt is an English travel vlog YouTube channel operated by Benjamin Rich, also known as Mr Bald. The Bald and Bankrupt YouTube channel enjoys global popularity, as of May 2026, the channel had 227 videos, 4.52 million subscribers and 727 million views. Rich has been described as a "British YouTube star".

Although one of the defining characteristics of Rich's channel was his interest in Russia, Rich was deported and banned from the country in 2022, having openly declared his support for Ukraine, and fundraised for Ukraine.

== Career ==
The name of Rich's channel derives from the business he was running before he started his channel going bankrupt. One of the defining characteristic of Rich's channel is his interest in the post-Soviet states, which Bald has explained by stating: "I chose the Soviet Union, because I began to be fascinated by the USSR when I was roughly 15–years–old with the Wall coming down, perestroika, all that kind of stuff. It was always my dream to travel across the former Soviet Union."

For his channel, Rich has produced videos around the world. Rich's video about a trip to Patamanta in Bolivia was reported by Gizmodo Español as "more scary than entering Chernobyl". In the video, he informed a local woman that he was a tourist, prompting her to warn him that "they burn people" in the area. Two men later approached Rich, inspected his passport, and gave him 30 minutes to explore and leave the area.

Following a November 2019 video filmed on a train to Chechnya, Rich was forced to apologise on camera by Chechen authorities for making comments about Chechen women which the Chechen authorities claimed were disparaging. This marked the start of Rich's problems in Russia.

In May 2020, after exploring no-lockdown areas during the COVID-19 pandemic in Serbia, Rich uploaded a video to his channel stating that he could not walk to the bathroom or breathe by the time he sought medical attention, that he had low blood oxygen and was suffering from multiple organ failure, and complaining about his primitive level of medical treatment in a Serbian hospital. He then deleted the video, and it was later reported that his level of care had been upgraded after an appeal to the Russian authorities. He later urged his followers not to make the same mistakes as he had, and to take the virus seriously.

Rich did many videos from Belarus up to 2020. At the time of the 2020–2021 Belarusian protests Rich was highly critical of president of Belarus Alexander Lukashenko, and took parts against the Belorussian government and president from Prague, where it was reported he had moved to live. Rich stated in an interview in September 2020 that he believed after this he was blacklisted from Belarus, and would be unable to return.

Rich was in Kyiv at the start of the Russian invasion of Ukraine in February 2022, immediately fleeing Ukraine with fellow travel vlogger F, Johnny . Rich then went to Kazakhstan, and on 7 May 2022, Rich and his girlfriend, Alina Tselupa, were detained at the Baikonur Cosmodrome for unsanctioned entry to a guarded site and reported as being under police investigation, to determine "the exact level of participation in illegal activities" of him and his Belorussian partner. Rich himself downplayed the incident, stating that he had paid a "£60 administrative fine just like hundreds of foreign adventurers before me", and had been questioned for Russian police a few hours for going to see the Buran spaceplane without permission. On 1 September 2022, Rich posted a video from Russia, announcing he had been arrested and subsequently ordered to leave the country. Rich stated that it would be his final video covering travels through Russia, as he had been banned from returning. Other channels posted a video of Rich apparently being questioned by Russian policemen, asking why he had called Vladimir Putin "crazy" and had fundraised in support of Ukraine.

== Reception ==
Rich's content has attracted coverage in various national media, particularly publications in the towns and regions he visits. New Delhi publication The New Learn reported on Rich's travels in India in January 2019. They praised his visits to refugee camps for Hindus in North Delhi stranded after the crisis in Pakistan, describing his videos as "introducing the world to an India that is real and authentic, where people still open up their lunch boxes to strangers, where tea is the beginning of lifelong associations, where trust means more than money and where there is vibrancy everywhere".

In March 2019, Hindustan Times reported on how he exposed scams against tourists in Delhi Airport, from inflated prices to rickshaw drivers and false claims. In June 2019, Rich was discussed in the Slovak press for his visit to Luník IX, which he described as "Europe's largest poor Roma neighbourhood". The article described how, despite warnings about the estate being among the most dangerous in Europe, he was welcomed by local people who spoke fluent English and invited him to their homes, which he described as "better than [his] apartment in Britain".

Afisha Daily journalist Lyubava Zaitseva wrote about Rich's choice of Russian destinations in September 2019, stating that even its Russian readers had "not seen such Russia" and praising him for "trying to distance himself from tourist places" and showing cities "from the inside, communicating with local residents".

== Publications ==
- Chichester, Arthur (2018). The Burning Edge : Travels Through Irradiated Belarus. Independently Published. ISBN 978-1-9807-8751-8. OCLC 1107791946.
