= Putin's Palace (film) =

2021 documentary film by Alexei Navalny

Putin's Palace. History of World's Largest Bribe
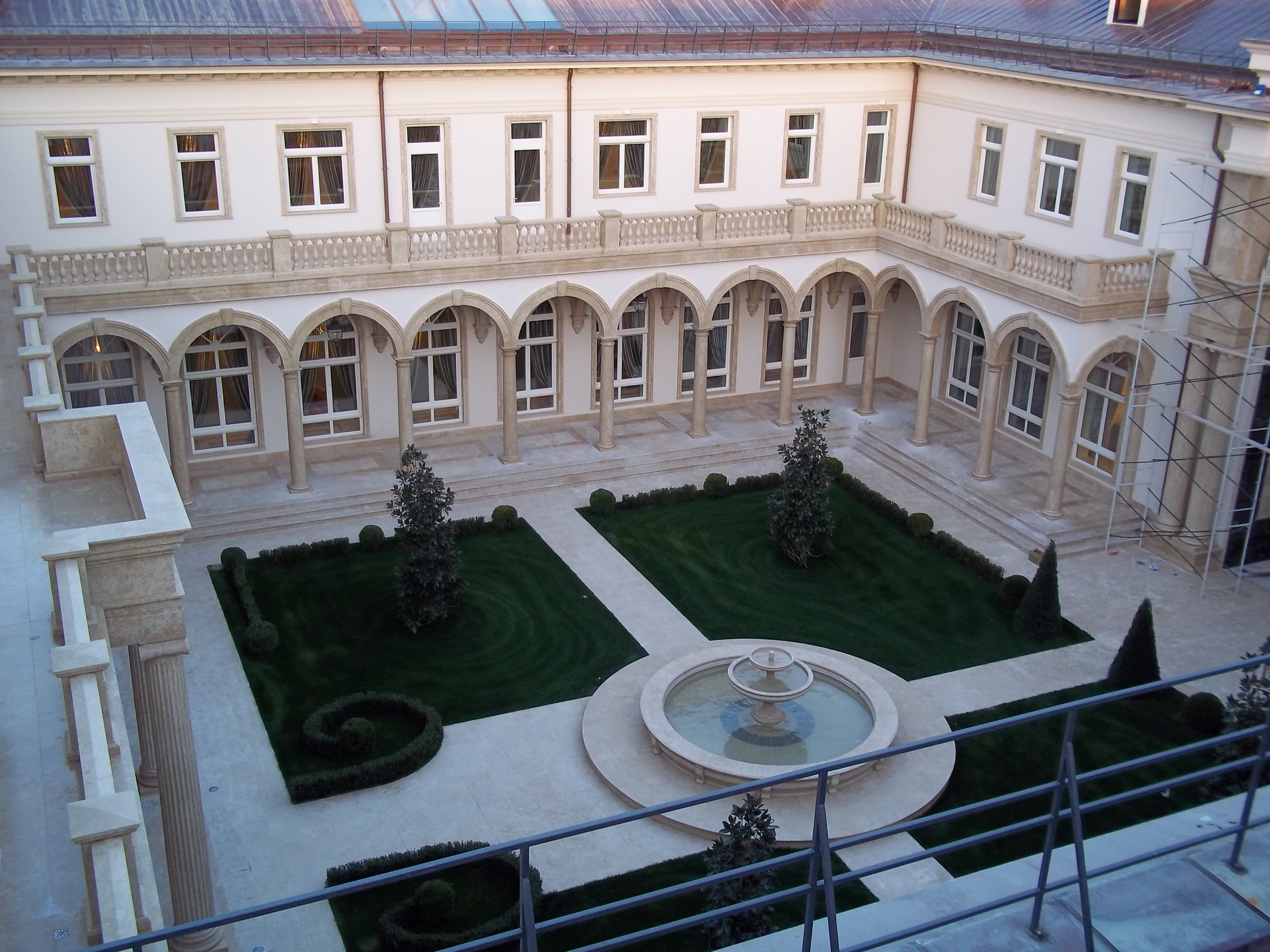
- The courtyard of the Residence at Cape Idokopas, the film's subject
- Original title: Дворец для Путина. История самой большой взятки
- Directed by: Alexei Navalny (uncredited)
- Written by: Alexei Navalny
- Produced by: Anti-Corruption Foundation
- Narrated by: Alexei Navalny
- Cinematography: Felix Angermaier
- Edited by: Vitaly Kolesnikov
- Distributed by: Anti-Corruption Foundation
- Release dates: 19 January 2021 (YouTube); 25 January 2021 (TVP Info)
- Running time: 113 minutes
- Country: Russia
- Languages: YouTube: Russian (with official English subtitles); TVP Info: Polish

External videos
- "Дворец для Путина. История самой большой взятки" (Putin's Palace. History of World's Largest Bribe) with English subtitles

Putin's Palace. History of World's Largest Bribe (Russian: Дворец для Путина. История самой большой взятки, romanized: Dvorets dlya Putina. Istoriya samoy bol'shoy vzyatki, lit. 'A palace for Putin. The story of the biggest bribe') is a 2021 Russian documentary film by the Anti-Corruption Foundation (FBK). The film investigates the residence commonly known as "Putin's Palace" that it claims was constructed for Russian president Vladimir Putin and details a corruption scheme allegedly headed by Putin involving the construction of the palace. The film estimates that the residence, located near the town of Gelendzhik in Krasnodar Krai, cost over ₽100 billion (approximately $1.35 billion) with what it says was "the largest bribe in history".

Putin has said that neither he nor his family ever owned the palace and downplayed the investigation. Oligarch Arkady Rotenberg, who has close links to Putin, claimed ownership.

== Synopsis ==
The film opens with a call for people to come out and participate in protests demanding the release of Alexei Navalny, the film's narrator and scriptwriter, who was detained after arriving in Russia following treatment and rehabilitation in Germany in connection with his poisoning in 2020. Alexei Navalny then goes on to tell the story of the making of the film, saying that the film is an in-depth look into the psychological portrait of Vladimir Putin.

The film mainly focuses on the building of the Residence at Cape Idokopas, a dacha located near the town of Gelendzhik in Krasnodar Krai, which Navalny calls "the largest private house in Russia", citing documents regarding its construction, some of which are then presented to the audience for viewing. According to The Straits Times, these documents included itemised lists of purchased furniture and samples of the building's floor plans, which were handed over to the Anti-Corruption Foundation by a subcontractor involved with its construction. Allegedly, all vehicles entering the compound are subject to inspections at several checkpoints, and workers are strictly forbidden from carrying mobile phones with a camera. Besides the complex itself, the restricted area also includes an underground ice palace and two helipads, an arboretum and greenhouse measuring 2,500 square metres (27,000 sq ft), a church, an amphitheatre, a teahouse and an 80-metre (260 ft) bridge leading to the compound, which crosses a ravine. Due to its location on a steep bank, a special tunnel was dug to provide access to the nearby beach, which contains a tasting room overlooking the Black Sea. The area of the palace complex is 68 hectares (170 acres), with 7,000 hectares (17,000 acres) of land surrounding the palace being designated as a closed territory under the jurisdiction of the Federal Security Service. According to the film, all fishing activities within a radius of two kilometres from the Residence at Cape Idokopas is banned and the airspace over the palace complex is closed to all aircraft. The film also shows 3D renders of the palace interior and exterior made using the floorplan, leaked photos and after inquiring with the furniture brands. The film goes on to focus on the businesses located within the complex, a luxury winery, vineyards and an oyster farm, showing inconsistencies between their estimated values and reported productions and revenues. It establishes how the (changing) ownerships conceal an interconnected network of managers as well as "donors" that supply money. The network includes former associates (e.g. Vladimir Kolbin, son of a childhood friend of Putin) or relatives of Putin (e.g. Mikhail Shelomov of JSC Accept), but also state-owned companies such as Transneft through shady "leasing" services. Huge sums are funneled into the compound in what Navalny calls the "biggest bribe" and Putin's "slush fund".

== Reception ==
In under a day, the film, which was released on Navalny's YouTube channel, had garnered over 20 million views. According to MBKh Media, the film was the most watched video on YouTube that day. By the next day, the film was in YouTube's top 10 trending videos in 23 countries, with it being number one in Russia, Belarus, Cyprus, Estonia, Kazakhstan, Latvia, Lithuania, and Ukraine. In under two days, the film garnered over 40 million views. In three days, it garnered over 60 million views. On 28 January, the film garnered over 100 million views.

On the day the documentary film was published, Kremlin spokesman Dmitry Peskov said that he had not yet seen the film but stated that Putin did not have any palaces. The next day, he called the film a "pseudo-investigation" and a "scam" to reporters, saying that citizens should "think before transferring money to such swindlers".

President Putin later stated, in a video conference with students on Student's Day, that the palace did not belong to him or his close relatives. He also claimed that the materials were used to "brainwash" citizens.

The Federal Security Service (FSB) said that a no-fly zone was established in the area where the palace is located, near where it says an FSB outpost is located, due to "increased intelligence activity by a number of neighboring states, including those belonging to NATO." The FSB also denied that a no-sail order was in effect near the area. The Federal Protective Service (FSO) denied that the area was designated for protection or that there were any FSO-imposed restrictions.

On 30 January, Arkady Rotenberg, who has close links to Putin, publicly claimed ownership of the palace. He said: "I have managed to strike a deal with creditors a few years ago, and I became a beneficiary of this site a few years ago." He also said that the property would be completed "in a couple of years" and that it was expected to become an apartment hotel. However, he gave no further financial details of how it was funded and purchased.

The BBC Russian Service spoke to several construction workers who said they worked on the palace between 2005 and 2020, confirming several of the allegations made in the FBK investigation, including that the palace was being rebuilt due to mould.

=== Polls ===
In a Levada Center poll carried out from 29 January to 2 February 2021, 26% of Russian adult respondents said that they saw the film, 10% said that they did not see it but were familiar with its content, 32% said they heard about it, and 31% said they did not hear anything about it. Out of those who saw the film or heard about it, 3% said that their attitude to Putin improved, 17% said that it worsened, and 77% said that it did not change. Out of those who saw the film or heard about it, 33% said they were sure that the film was untrue, 38% believed that it seemed true but it was difficult to assess the credibility of the accusations and 17% said they were sure that it was true. Out of all respondents, when asked if they believed Putin was guilty of abuses of power, 17% said that he was undoubtedly guilty, 25% said he was probably as guilty as other high-ranking officials, 24% said that even if true, the country began to live better under his rule, and 29% believed that he did not ever abuse his power. The poll also showed a generational gap, with younger respondents being more likely to have watched the film and believing that Putin was guilty of abuses of power.

=== Reaction on the Internet ===
The film caused a stir and interest among Internet users. The footage from the film became the basis for the creation of many memes and the reason for mocking jokes. The so-called "Mud Room" and "Aquadiscoteca" aroused great interest. Social media users also compared the palace to the Mezhyhirya Residence, the controversial residence of former Ukrainian President Viktor Yanukovych.

Based on the film, the video "Aquadiscoteca" was released with the participation of actor Alexander Gudkov. The description stated that its authors were opposed to restricting the freedom of innocent people. A humorous parody video about the palace of the fictional character Vitaly Nalivkin was also shot based on the film.

== See also ==
- 2017–2018 Russian protests
- 2021 Russian protests
- Corruption in Russia
- Putin's Palace
- He Is Not Dimon to You
