= Vitaly Nalivkin =

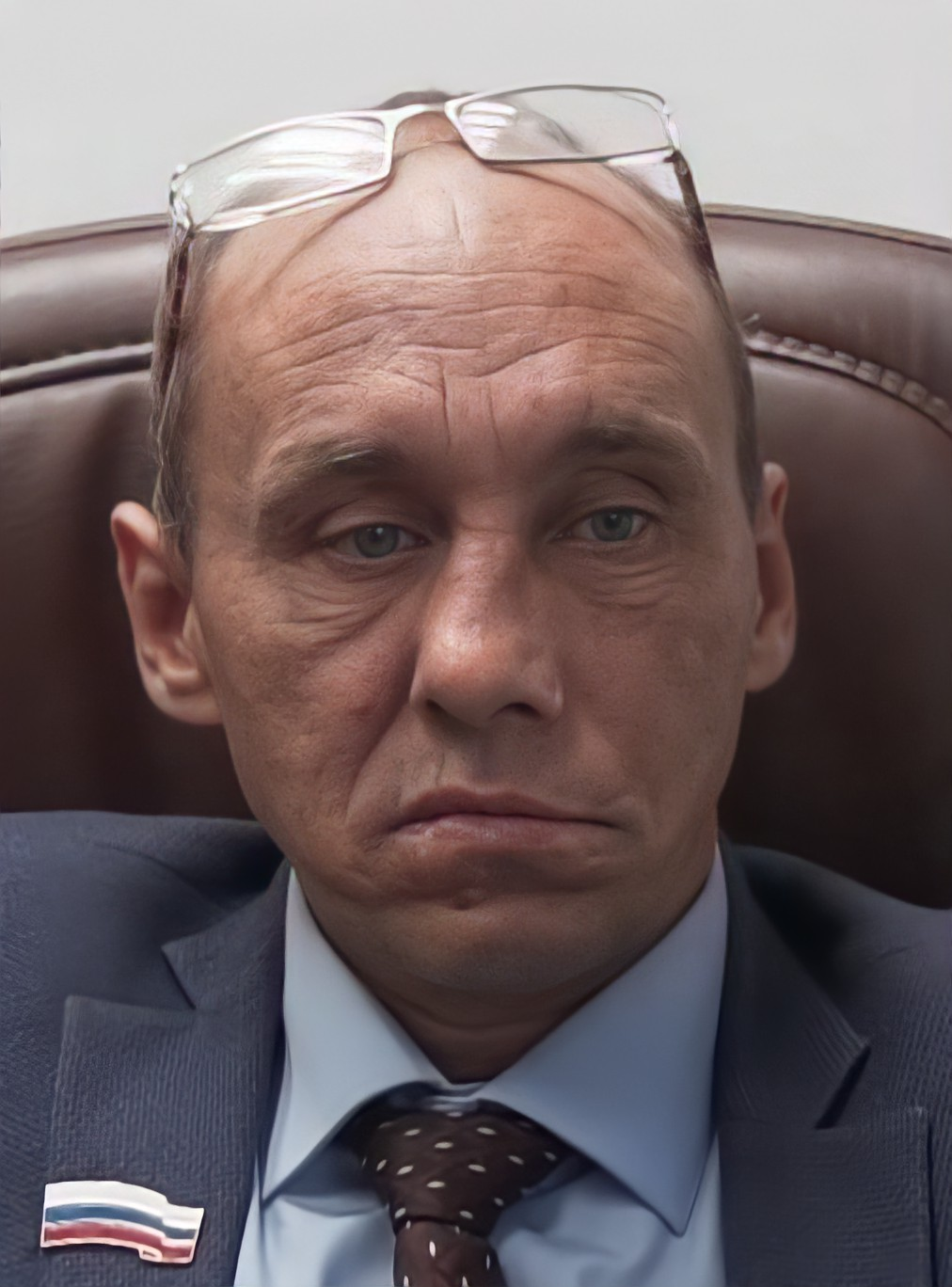
- Andrey Neretin as Vitaly Nalivkin
- Created by: Andrey Gennadievich Klochkov
- Portrayed by: Andrey Alexandrovich Neretin

In-universe information
- Full name: Vitaly Ivanovich Nalivkin
- Occupation: Chairman of the Executive Committee of the Ussuriysky district
- Home: Ussuriysk, Primorsky Krai, Russia
- Nationality: Russian

Vitaly Ivanovich Nalivkin (Russian: Виталий Иванович Наливкин) is a fictional character in a satirical sketch show. According to the plots of the videos, he is the chairman of the executive committee of the Ussuriysky district.

The role of Nalivkin was played by amateur actor Andrey Alexandrovich Neretin (31 December 1975, Kansk – 5 October 2024, Ussuriysk).

The author of the YouTube channel was Andrey Gennadievich Klochkov. He was both a director, a producer, and a screenwriter. The co-producer was Semyon Vavilov.

== Image ==
The collective image of Vitaly Nalivkin was created by a team led by Andrey Klochkov, which included actors and former television staff. About ten people worked on each video. In videos posted on the BARAKuda YouTube channel and other social networks, 'Nalivkin, chairman of the executive committee of the Ussuriysky district', effectively and radically solves various problems in Ussuriysk. Nalivkin's behaviour exaggeratedly parodies local officials. The first video was published in April 2019, and by June 2020 there were already more than thirty of them. Some videos were no more than a minute long, which allowed them to be posted not only on YouTube, but also on Instagram. The character gained high popularity first in Ussuriysk, and then throughout Russia.

== Videos on the topic of high-profile events ==
Some of the channel's videos were devoted to high-profile events taking place in Russia. Several videos were also dedicated to the fight against coronavirus.

On 3 August 2020, at the height of the protests in Khabarovsk Krai, which began following the detention of Governor Sergei Furgal, a video entitled 'Arrest in Khabarovsk' was published, in which Vitaly Nalivkin purportedly detained Mikhail Degtyarev, the acting governor of Khabarovsk Krai. In the video, they stated that they could transfer the detainee to Moscow in exchange for the former governor, Sergei Furgal. In the meantime, Vitaly Nalivkin himself would lead Khabarovsk Krai.

On 26 October 2020, after the mass death of marine animals in Kamchatka, a video entitled 'Vitaly Nalivkin saves Kamchatka' was published, in which Vitaly Nalivkin disinfects the ocean and saves Kamchatka from pollution.

On 9 February 2021, a satirical video entitled 'Nalivkin's Palace' was published, which was based on Alexei Navalny's documentary Putin's Palace. History of the World's Largest Bribe.

In April 2022, a satirical video was published about Alexey Andreychenko, a former police chief of the Ussuriysky district who was sanctioned and had hidden his yacht in an inland body of water. Andreychenko refused to reveal the source of his wealth, which led to Nalivkin confiscating the scarce products of zucchini and pumpkins from his yacht. He then destroyed the yacht with a grenade launcher.

== Media reports about Nalivkin ==
On 17 May 2019, shortly after the channel's opening, a report about Nalivkin's activities was featured on the regional TV channel VGTRK Vladivostok in the programme Vesti: Primorye. On 22 May 2019, the federal programme Vesti on the Russia 24 TV channel also featured a story about Nalivkin.

On 16 July 2020, the documentary Vitaly Nalivkin: a New Image of a Russian Official was released on Alexey Pivovarov's YouTube channel Redaksiya. Pivovarov also appeared in a video with Nalivkin as one of the occult sectarians who were ruining the weather in Ussuriysk.

On 2 September 2020, Nalivkin was the subject of a discussion on the NTV programme Mesto vstrechi. Studio guests, including State Duma deputies and political analysts, believed in Nalivkin's existence. He was called a 'big polytechnic project', and Deputy Vitaly Milonov criticised him for his manual management methods.

On 30 August 2021, Nalivkin's channel released a satirical video about a fictional traffic police colonel named Mikhail Safronov, who collected bribes in the form of vegetables and installed golden plumbing fixtures in his home. On 6 September, journalist Maksim Shevchenko released a video on his YouTube channel about corruption in Russia, using Nalivkin's video as if it were real and claiming that he had simply found it online. Later, Nalivkin himself watched Shevchenko's video on his channel.

On 29 March 2024, after the project was closed, The Insider released a video interview with Andrey Neretin. In the interview, the actor said that he had received an offer to participate in the filming from a producer to whom he had provided cargo transportation services, and that the filming was well paid. Neretin stated that his condition was that there should be no politics in the videos, but as the channel's popularity grew, the producers began to include political subjects. According to him, the filming stopped after a criminal case was opened against them, and it is unlikely to resume, although he is not opposed to continuing.

== Awards ==
On 3 December 2020, on Lawyer's Day, Vitaly Nalivkin was awarded the 'Malinovaya Femida' anti-award for his questionable achievements in the field of law.

== Conflicts with law enforcement agencies ==
In the video 'Vitaly Nalivkin Fights Corruption', which was released on 10 June 2020 and made in the format of a news report, Nalivkin purportedly exposes a lieutenant colonel of the Ministry of Internal Affairs, whose apartment is found to contain 'hundreds of kilograms' of cash. On 11 June 2020, a message appeared stating that the police were investigating the video. The police statement said that 'the director of the video expressed clear disrespect for the government, thereby discrediting the officers of the internal affairs agencies'. First, the creators of the video were summoned for questioning and fined. Andrey Neretin, who played Nalivkin, was then detained and subjected to administrative arrest for five days, according to the official version, 'for using obscene language'. After being released, Andrey Neretin starred in a new video, in which he thanked the Ussuriysk police officers while in character: 'It was only thanks to them that more people learned about us, and we reached the national level.'

On 23 September 2021, the Ussuriysk court arrested actress Larisa Krivonosova for ten days and fined her 1,000 roubles. She played the role of 'Marina Vulf, the official representative of the Ussuriysk District Ministry of Internal Affairs', parodying Irina Volk, the official representative of the Russian Ministry of Internal Affairs. The fine was imposed for wearing a police officer's uniform with insignia and Ministry of Internal Affairs symbols, which she had worn in two videos by Vitaly Nalivkin. The arrest, according to the actress, was unrelated to the filming of the video. A month later, she was convicted and sent to a penal colony for three months (formally, for other reasons, such as 'evading administrative supervision').

In August 2022, Andrey Kornienko, who played the role of Lieutenant Colonel Alexey Andreychenko, was charged with wearing a uniform with insignia. The uniform and the car's flashing lights were confiscated.

In November 2021, a criminal case of hooliganism was opened against the show's team. The reason for this was the video 'Vitaly Nalivkin prevented a terrorist attack', which was released on 20 September 2021, the day after the State Duma elections ended, and received almost 1.4 million views in half a month. In the video, Nalivkin accidentally destroys a United Russia agitation poster with an anti-tank grenade launcher. According to Andrey Klochkov, filming took place in a deserted location using pyrotechnic effects (the grenade launcher and machine guns in the video were mock-ups), and on 19 September, after filming was completed, the filming location was checked by the Ministry of Emergency Situations, which concluded that no damage had been caused to the city's property. However, according to Semyon Vavilov, a month and a half later, the inspection was repeated, and the damage was estimated at 32,000 roubles. On 4 November, the channel's studio, as well as the apartments of three members of the project team, were searched, and equipment was seized.

According to Klochkov, in the autumn of 2024, the investigation was reclassified (or a second criminal case was opened) to a more serious article on the manufacture of explosive devices, which threatened the authors of the video with punishment of up to fifteen years in prison.

== Further fate ==
On 5 April 2023, after several months of inactivity, a video entitled 'Vitaly Nalivkin forges victory' was released on the BARAKuda channel, in which the actor announced that his team had launched the production of protective equipment (anti-fragmentation plates) for the Russian military. The authors also began raising funds for the needs of the Russian army, effectively supporting the Russian army in the invasion of Ukraine. The show's creator, Andrey Klochkov, said that the new video is not ironic 'about the endless fees for the needs of the Russian military', nor is it a result of pressure from the authorities in connection with the criminal case previously brought against them. He refused to answer whether his team supports Russia's military actions in Ukraine.

In February 2024, it became known that Andrey Neretin had fallen down the stairs, injuring his hip. As a result of his injuries, he developed osteoarthritis, which he did not have enough funds to treat. By the spring of 2024, Neretin was living in poverty in a house without water or heating, together with a friend who helped him with household chores, and was waiting for a quota for a free operation. Klochkov announced a fundraiser, thanks to which Neretin was successfully treated in St. Petersburg.

On 5 October 2024, Andrey Neretin died as a result of an exacerbation of chronic diseases and, consequently, cardiac arrest. He was buried at the cemetery in the village of Vozdvizhenka.
