= Patamanta =

Town in Bolivia

Coordinates: 16.3775°S 68.3786°W

Patamanta is a small town in Bolivia. It is the second largest town in the district of Pucarani in the province of Los Andes, and is located on the right bank of an inlet towards Lake Titicaca. The village is located on the Altiplano. It lies on the plateau between the Andean mountain ranges of the Cordillera Occidental in the west and the Cordillera Central in the east. Due to the historical population development, the region has a high proportion of Aymara people, with 96.7% of the population speaking the Aymara language. The population was 691 in 1992, increasing to 745 in 2001, and then 857 in 2012.

The region has a pronounced daytime climate in which the average temperature fluctuations are more evident during the day than during the course of the year. The annual average temperature of the region is 9 °C, while the average monthly values fluctuate only slightly between 6 °C in July and 10 °C in November and December. The annual precipitation is about 600 mm, and the monthly precipitation is between less than 15 mm in the months of June to August and between 100 and 120 mm from December to February.

In December 2019, English travel vlogger Bald and Bankrupt's video about a trip to Patamanta was reported on by the Spanish-language branch of Gizmodo, who called it "more scary than entering Chernobyl". The video showed him informing a local woman that he was a tourist, prompting her to warn him that "they burn people" in the area. Two men later approached him, inspected his passport, and gave him 30 minutes to explore and then leave the area.
