= 2021 Russian protests =

Protests in opposition to Vladimir Putin

- Part of opposition to Vladimir Putin in Russia
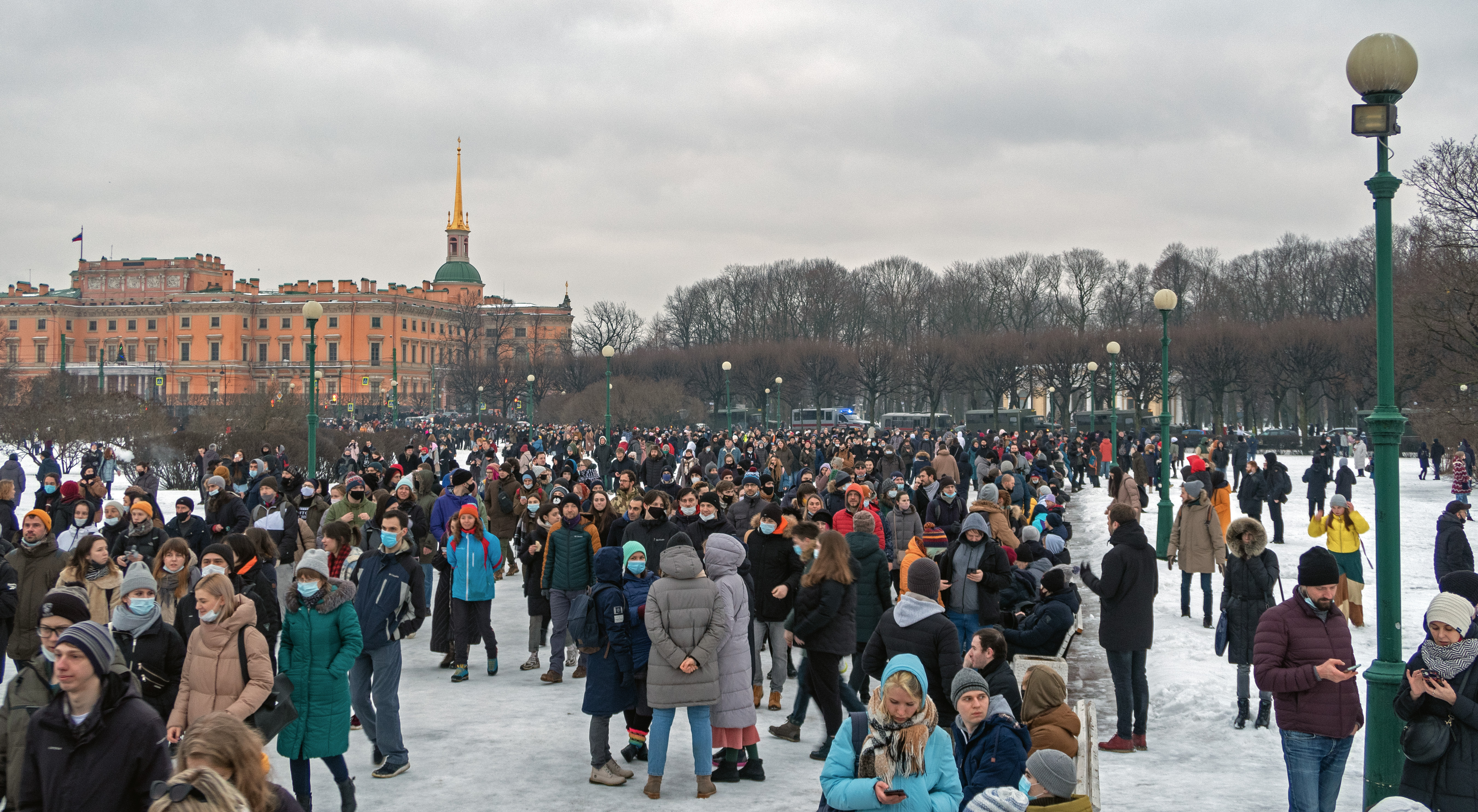
- A demonstration in the Field of Mars, Saint Petersburg on 23 January
- Date: 23 January – 21 April 2021 (2 months, 4 weeks and 1 day)
- Location: Russia and other countries (Note: Including Austria, Germany, Israel, Japan, Moldova, Guam, the Netherlands, the United Kingdom, and others.)
- Caused by: Arrest of Alexei Navalny; Opposition to Vladimir Putin; Release of the film Putin's Palace; Corruption in Russia
- Goals: Release of Navalny; Resignation of Putin
- Methods: Protests; Demonstrations; Picketing; Internet activism
- Result: Protests suppressed: Thousands of protesters arrested; Navalny's suspended sentence upgraded to multiple years of incarceration; Organizations connected to or led by Navalny designated as extremist, banned, and liquidated

Parties
(Russia) Opposition: Anti-Corruption Foundation; Russia of the Future; People's Freedom Party; Yabloko; Open Russia; Libertarian Party; Pirate Party of Russia; Supported by: Russian Socialist Movement; Left Front; United Communist Party; Union of Marxists; Leninist Komsomol of the Russian Federation (factions); Communists of Russia (factions); Socialist Alternative; Autonomous Action; Russian Communist Workers' Party of the Communist Party of the Soviet Union; Revolutionary Workers' Party	(Russia) Government: Ministry of Internal Affairs; Police; National Guard; National Guard Forces Command; OMON; SOBR; Supported by: All-Russia People's Front; United Russia; A Just Russia; For Truth; Rodina; Liberal Democratic Party of Russia; Communist Party of the Russian Federation

Lead figures
No centralized leadership, notable people involved: Alexei Navalny (imprisoned); Yulia Navalnaya; Leonid Volkov; Lyubov Sobol; Ivan Zhdanov	Vladimir Putin (Russia) Mikhail Mishustin; Vladimir Kolokoltsev; Viktor Zolotov

Casualties
- Injuries: 23 January: 39 police officers (minor), 50 journalists, 2 serious injuries
- Arrested: 23 January: 4,000+ 31 January: 5,600+ 2 February: 1,500+ 14 February: 19; 21 April: 2,100+

The 2021 Russian protests, also known as Navalny Protests, began on 23 January 2021 in support of the opposition leader Alexei Navalny after he was immediately detained upon returning to Russia after being sent to Germany for treatment following his poisoning the previous year. Days before protests began, a film by Navalny and his Anti-Corruption Foundation (FBK) called Putin's Palace, which revolves around the connection between president Vladimir Putin and a palace allegedly being built for him, was released.

On the first day, protests were held in 122 towns and cities across Russia in what were one of the largest anti-government demonstrations since protests were held against the results of legislative elections in 2011 and Putin's re-election in 2012. Unsanctioned by the authorities, the protests were met with police crackdowns, with thousands detained. As a result, Navalny's team announced a suspension of street protests on 4 February, stating that they would focus on legislative elections that would be held later in the year, and later announcing a shift from street protests to courtyard protests to avoid direct confrontation with police. In response to Navalny's deterioration of health while in prison, street protests were held again on 21 April for the last time.

Despite the protests, Navalny's suspended sentence of three and a half years was replaced with a prison sentence on 2 February. Following the protests, the Moscow prosecutor's office on 16 April formally requested the Moscow City Court to designate organizations linked to Navalny including the FBK and his headquarters as extremist organizations, claiming: "Under the disguise of liberal slogans, these organizations are engaged in creating conditions for the destabilization of the social and socio-political situation." On 9 June, the organizations were designated as extremist and liquidated by the court. In March 2022, Navalny was sentenced to an additional nine years in prison after being found guilty of embezzlement and contempt of court in a new trial.

== Background ==
Navalny had been hospitalized on 20 August 2020, in serious condition after he was poisoned with a Novichok nerve agent during a flight from Tomsk to Moscow. He was medically evacuated to Berlin and discharged on 22 September. The use of a Novichok nerve agent was confirmed by the Organisation for the Prohibition of Chemical Weapons (OPCW). Though the Kremlin denied involvement in his poisoning, the EU and the UK responded by imposing sanctions on six senior Russian officials and a state chemical centre. Navalny accused president Vladimir Putin of being responsible for his poisoning. An investigation by Bellingcat and The Insider implicated agents from the Federal Security Service (FSB) in Navalny's poisoning.

Navalny returned to Russia on 17 January 2021, where he was immediately detained on accusations of violating terms of a suspended jail sentence. Prior to his return, the Federal Penitentiary Service (FSIN) said that Navalny may face jail time upon his arrival in Moscow for violating the terms of his probation, saying it would be "obliged" to detain him once he returned; in 2014, Navalny received a suspended sentence in the Yves Rocher case, which he called politically motivated and in 2017, the European Court of Human Rights ruled that Navalny was unfairly convicted. The Investigative Committee of Russia also said that it was investigating Navalny for alleged fraud. A court decision the next day ordered the detention of Navalny until 15 February for violating his parole. A makeshift court was set up in the police station where Navalny was being held. Another hearing would later be held to determine whether his suspended sentence should be replaced with a jail term. Navalny described the procedure as “ultimate lawlessness”. He also called on his supporters to take to the streets, saying: “Do not be silent. Resist. Take to the streets – not for me, but for you”. Navalny's regional network head, Leonid Volkov, said that preparations were being made for protests to be organised across the country on 23 January.

While in jail, an investigation by Navalny and his Anti-Corruption Foundation (FBK) was published on 19 January, accusing Putin of corruption involving the construction of a palace by the Black Sea known as "Putin's Palace". The video of the investigation also urged people to take to the streets. Before the protests had begun, the video on YouTube received over 60 million views. By the next day the state communications watchdog Roskomnadzor was demanding the social networks VKontakte (VK) and TikTok to stop the spread of calls to the protests. The efficacy of these calls is disputed.

Arrests of several of Navalny's aides and allies, including Lyubov Sobol, began on 21 January. Several were jailed or fined on charges of disobeying police orders or organizing a public event without notifying the authorities, with Sobol being fined and released. The Ministry of Internal Affairs also threatened to prosecute those spreading calls to join the protests. The Prosecutor General's Office also ordered the censor, Roskomnadzor, to block access to pages that call for unauthorized rallies. On 22 January, the Main Directorate of the Ministry of Internal Affairs for Moscow issued a statement warning against calls to the protests or participation in them. It stated that any attempts to hold unauthorized events as well as “provocative actions by the participants” would be regarded as a “threat to public order” and be “immediately suppressed”. Social media networks began removing information about the protests. VK blocked access to a number of pages on the protests, with the pages stating that it was blocked on the requirement of the General Prosecutor's Office. Roskomnadzor also stated that VK, Instagram, TikTok and YouTube blocked some content which involved “calls for children to participate in illegal mass events”. However, Facebook and YouTube have countered this claim. Facebook said it “received requests from the local regulator to restrict access to certain content that calls for protest. Since this content doesn't violate our Community Standards, it remains on our platform.”

== Events ==
=== 23 January ===
Krasnodar protesters chanting demands (English subs available)

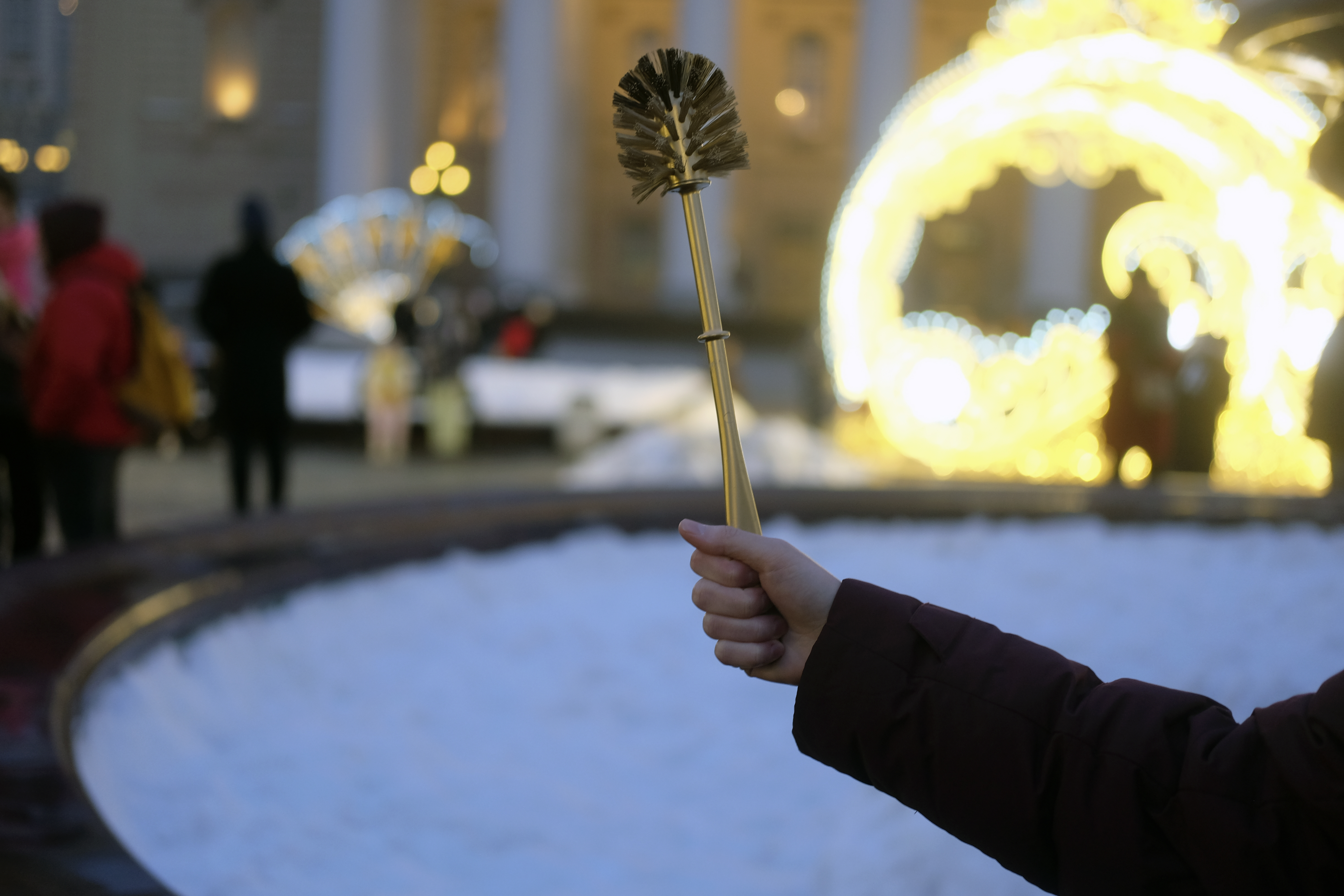
Some protesters held toilet brushes, referencing Navalny's investigation into Putin's alleged palace.

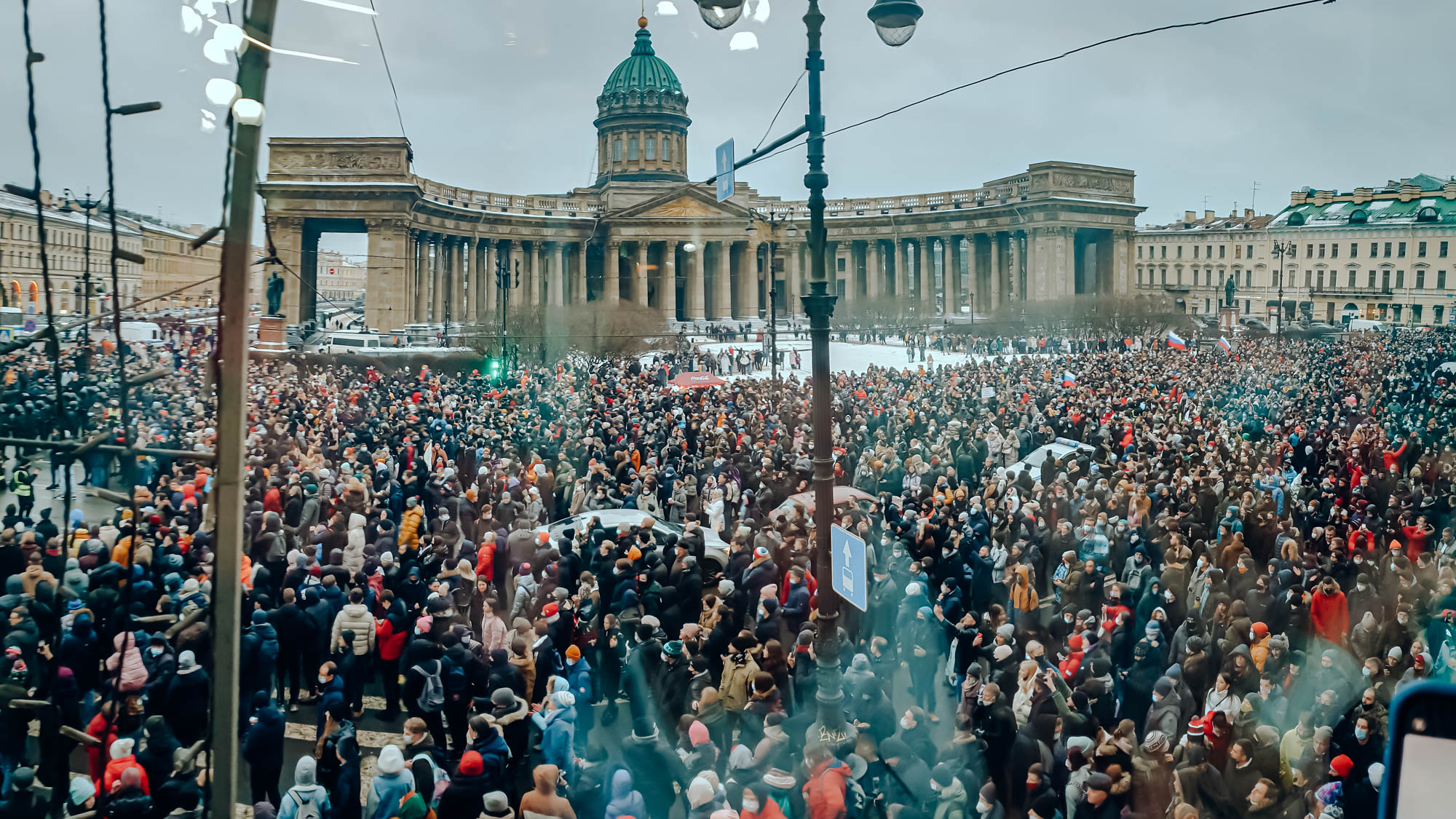
Nevsky Prospekt, St. Petersburg

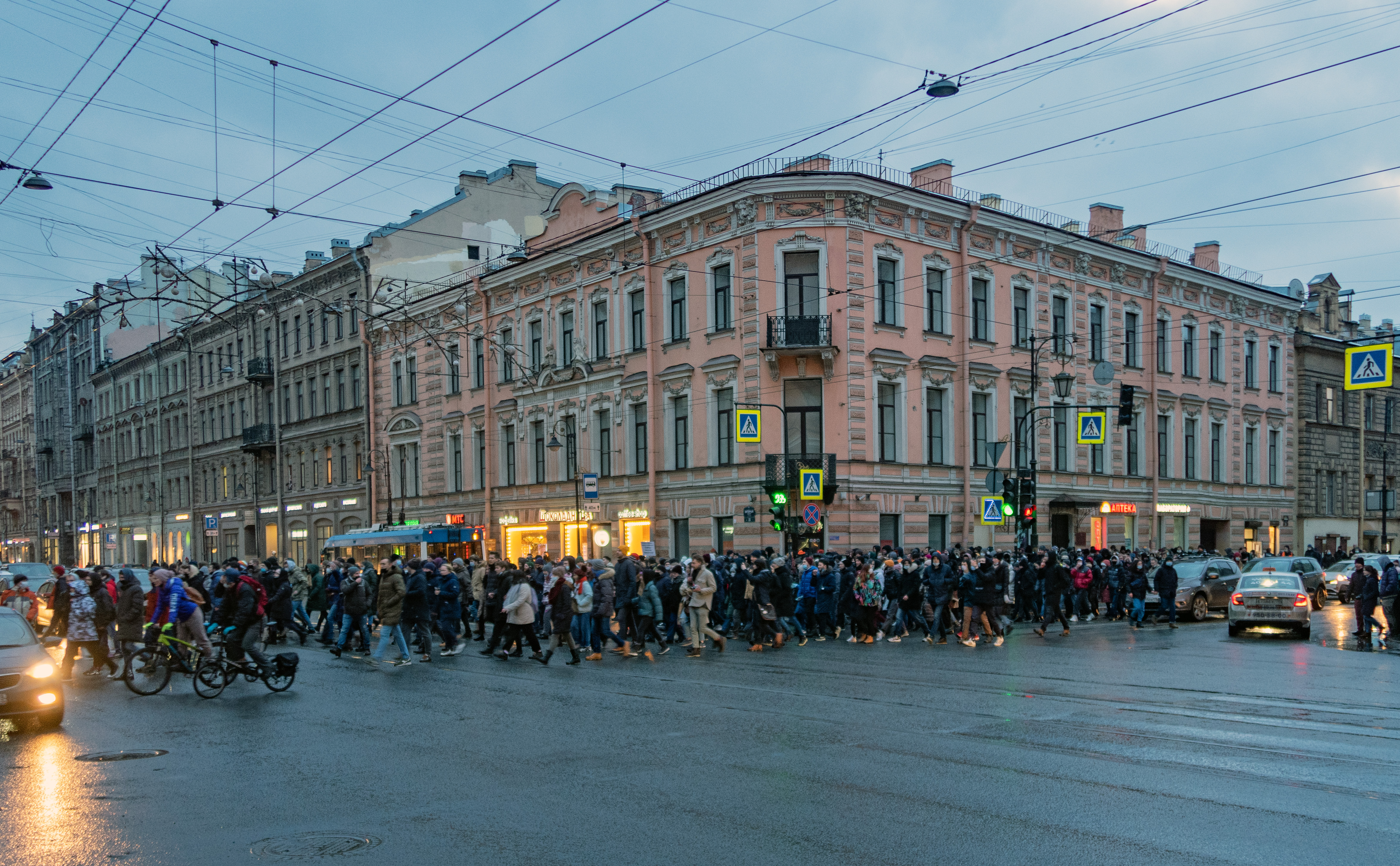
Liteyny Avenue, St. Petersburg

Reuters estimated up to 40,000 protesters gathered in Moscow. Authorities gave a figure of only 4,000 participants, while other estimates included 15,000 and 25,000 participants. Protesters began gathering at Tverskaya Street and Pushkinskaya Square, with a procession ending near Matrosskaya Tishina where Navalny was being held. Riot police in the city began breaking up the protest and detaining participants before it was scheduled to start. Alexei Navalny's wife, Yulia Navalnaya, was detained by police at the exit of Moscow's Teatralnaya metro station; she was released after being detained for 3 hours. Navalny's ally, Lyubov Sobol, was also detained shortly after arriving at Pushkinskaya Square and was later fined. Clashes between police and protesters broke out. In Tsvetnoy Boulevard, an FSB car was stopped by a crowd of protesters and hit with snowballs, with state media reporting that the driver of the car sustained an eye injury. State media reported that around 40 police officers were injured. The Investigative Committee said that it opened a probe into instances of violence against police. Russian rapper Noize MC, rapper Vladi from the group Kasta, director Vasily Sigarev, writer Dmitry Bykov and others attended the protest in Pushkinskaya Square.

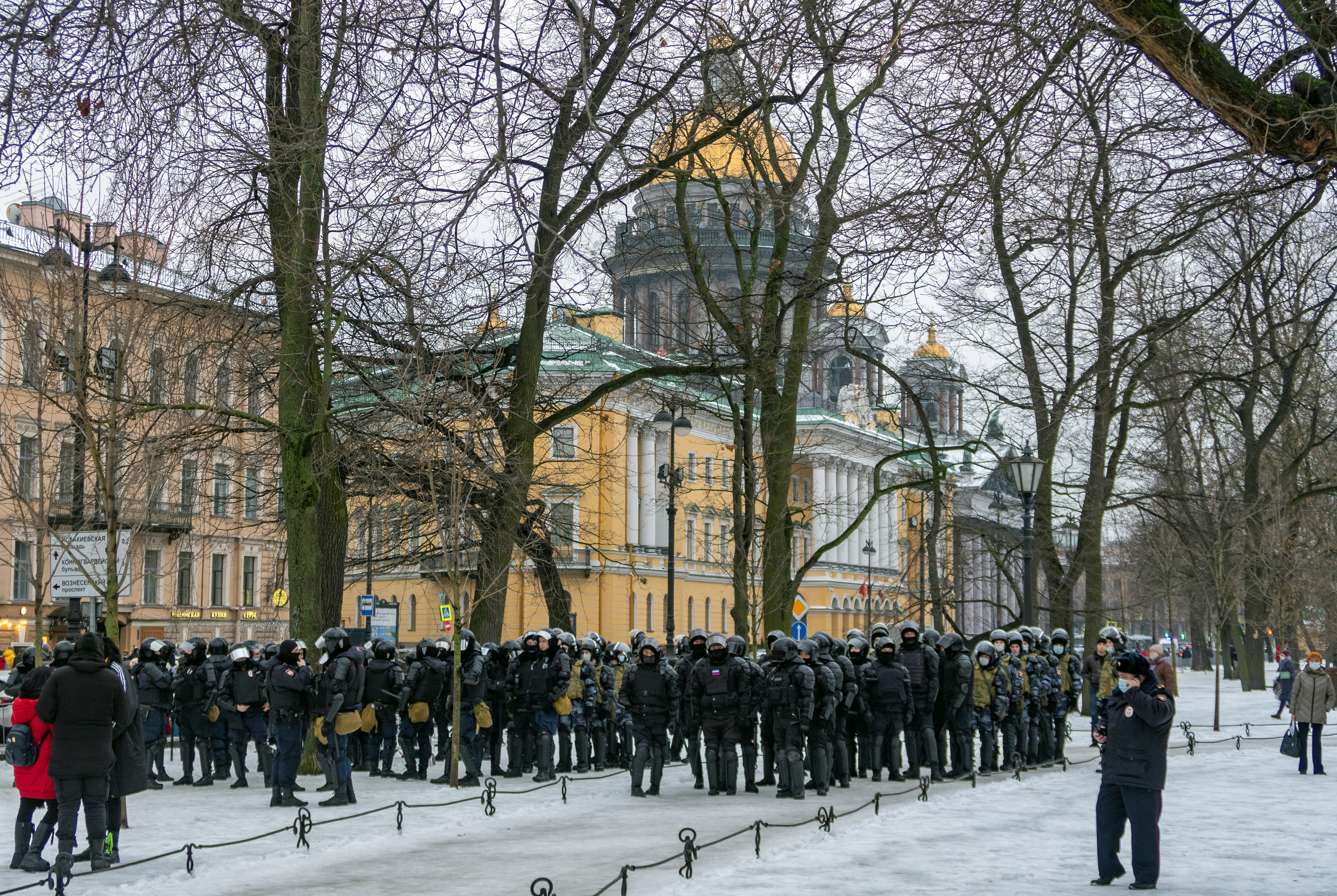
Alexander Garden, St. Petersburg

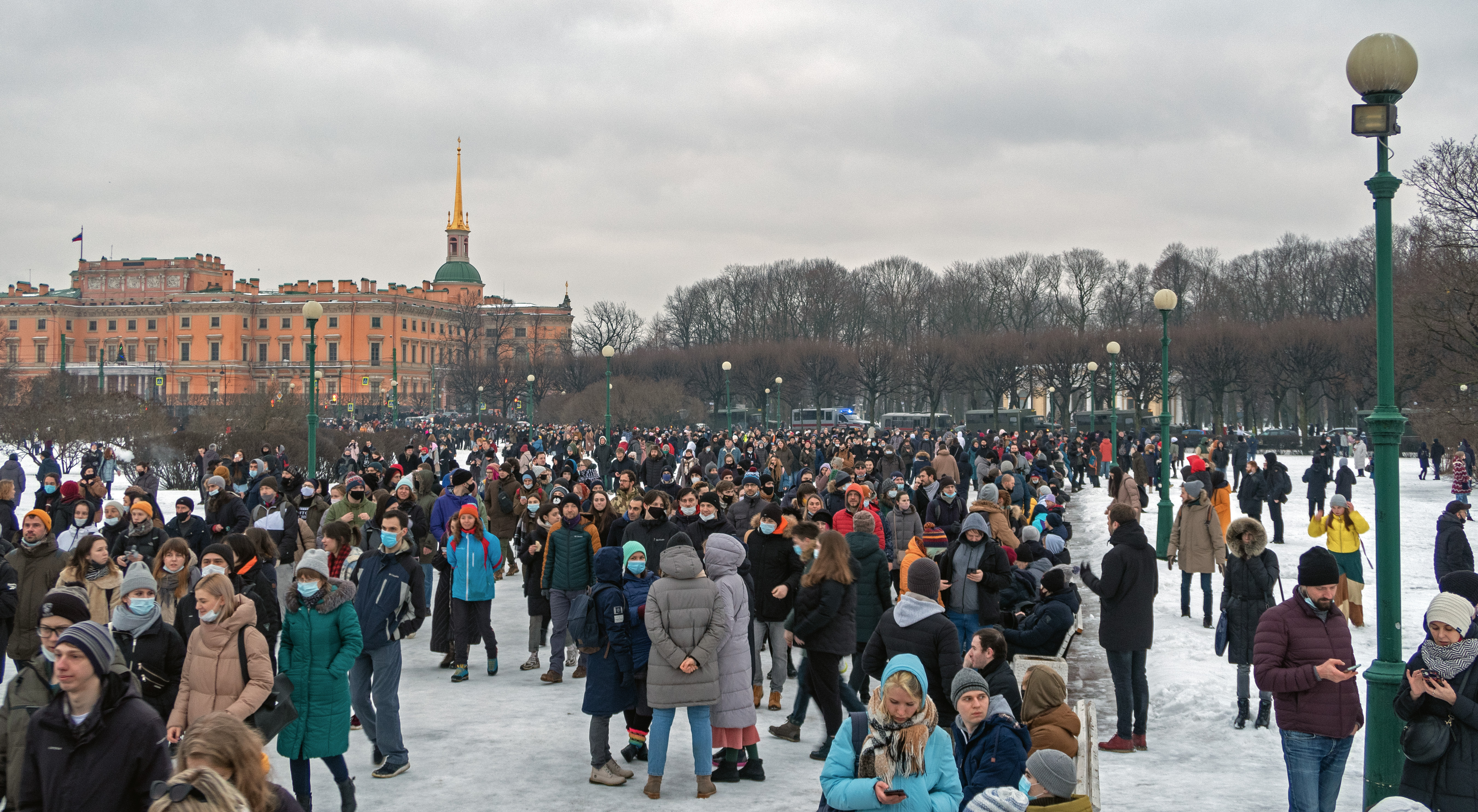
Field of Mars, St. Petersburg

According to Kommersant, about 5,000 protesters gathered in St. Petersburg. According to MBKh Media, around 10,000 people took part in the protest. Protesters gathered at Senate Square and moved towards Nevsky Prospekt and the Kazan Cathedral, then the Field of Mars, where police began to disperse the protesters. A video of a riot policeman kicking a woman in the stomach was circulated online. The woman was later reportedly taken to intensive care. The police apologized for the incident and it was reported that the Ministry of Internal Affairs opened a probe. According to OVD-Info, over 500 people in St. Petersburg were detained.

Estimates of the number of protesters in Perm varied between 3,000 and 10,000. According to MBKh Media, around 2,500 people attended the protest in Ufa, Bashkortostan, around 5,000 people attended the protest in Chelyabinsk, around 3,000 people attended the protest in Samara and around 3,000 people attended the protest in Arkhangelsk. In Kazan, around 3,000–4,000 people were estimated to have gathered at the protest which started on Bauman Street. In Kaliningrad, up to 3,000 people were estimated to have taken part in the protest, which moved towards Victory Square. In Krasnodar, around 5,000–7,000 people were estimated to have taken part in the protest, with over 50 people detained according to OVD-Info.

In Siberia, around 4,000 protesters gathered in Novosibirsk according to Tayga.info. Thousands walked from the city's House of Officers to Lenin Square in the city center. Police broke up the protest using force and blocked the main street. According to OVD-Info, around 100 people in the city were detained. In Irkutsk, several thousand people took part in the protest.

Estimates of the number of protesters in Yekaterinburg varied between 3,000 and 10,000. The regional authorities gave an estimate of 3,000 while the local headquarters of Navalny's team gave an estimate of 10,000 participants. According to Znak, around 5,000 people attended. The former mayor of the city and opposition politician Yevgeny Roizman and City Duma deputy Konstantin Kiselev attended the protests. Riot police began breaking up the protest and clashes between police and protesters broke out, with officers hit with snowballs.

In the Russian Far East, up to 3,000 protesters gathered in Vladivostok, according to Novaya Gazeta. Russian YouTuber Yury Dud attended the protest in the city, however told journalists that he came there for "musical, cultural and friendly affairs". Protesters moved towards the central square before being dispersed. According to Novaya Gazeta, around 1,000 protesters gathered in Khabarovsk by Lenin Square in support of both Navalny and the arrested former governor Sergey Furgal before police dispersed the crowd and started detaining participants. In Yakutsk, where temperatures reached −50 °C, several hundred protesters gathered in the city's main square. According to OVD-Info, over 60 people were detained in Khabarovsk, over 30 people were detained in Vladivostok and 30 people were detained in Yakutsk.

In some Russian cities, there were internet and mobile phone network outages. Communication issues were reported in cities including Moscow, St. Petersburg, Krasnodar, Tyumen, Chelyabinsk, Yekaterinburg, Voronezh, Rostov-on-Don, and Saratov. Twitter users in Russia also reported problems accessing the network.

4,002 people across the country were detained that day with over 1,500 of them in Moscow, according to OVD-Info.

==== By city ====
City	Number of participants
Abakan	–
Almetyevsk	–
Arkhangelsk	100–300
Astrakhan	500–1,000
Balashikha	–
Barnaul	1,500
Belgorod	–
Biysk	–
Blagoveshchensk	–
Bor	–
Bratsk	–
Cheboksary	1,500
Velikiye Luki	–
Veliky Novgorod	350–500
Vladivostok	3,000
Vladimir	–
Vologda	1,000
Voronezh	–
Yekaterinburg	10,000
Ivanovo	500–600
Izhevsk	1,000–1,500
Irkutsk	2,000
Kazan	10,000
Kemerovo	–
Kimry	–
Klin	–
Komsomolsk-on-Amur	–
Krasnoyarsk	1,000–1,500
Krasnodar	4,000–6,000
Kurgan	-
Lipetsk	1,000
Magnitogorsk	–
Makhachkala	–
Moscow	Up to 40,000
Murmansk	Hundreds
Naberezhnye Chelny	500–600
Nizhnevartovsk	30
Nizhny Novgorod	10,000
Nizhnaya Tura	–
Novomoskovsk	–
Novosibirsk	5,000
Omsk	–
Orenburg	–
Penza	–
Petrozavodsk	–
Pskov	–
Pushchino	–
Rostov-on-Don	3,000
Rybinsk	–
Ryazan	–
Saint Petersburg	-
Samara	2,000–3,000
Saratov	1,000–1,500
Sevastopol^{1}	200
Severodvinsk	100–200
Sergiyev Posad	–
Simferopol^{1}	–
Smolensk	–
Sochi	200–300
Surgut	30
Syktyvkar	1,000
Tambov	–
Tarusa	–
Tver	–
Tobolsk	–
Tolyatti	–
Tomsk	2,000
Tula	200
Tyumen	1,000–1,500
Ulan-Ude	–
Ulyanovsk	–
Ust-Ilimsk	–
Ufa (Bashkortostan)	–
Uyar	–
Khabarovsk	1,000–1,500
Khanty-Mansiysk	20
Kholmsk	–
Cherepovets	450
Chita	–
Yuzhno-Sakhalinsk	–
Yakutsk	–
In total	–

^{1} Internationally recognised as part of Ukraine, see political status of Crimea and annexation of Crimea by the Russian Federation for details.

==== Aftermath ====
Leonid Volkov, co-founder of Russia of the Future party, said that Navalny's team plans to organize more protests on 31 January, and then, on every subsequent Saturday or Sunday until their demands are met (somewhat similar to what is happening in Belarus since August 2020). Volkov also said that the next protests would be held outside the headquarters of the FSB at Lubyanka Square, as well as at Staraya Square, where the offices of the presidential administration are located. He said the organizers had decided to gather protesters outside the FSB building because they are the "poisoners" and the offices of the presidential administration because they "make the decisions about whether to jail or release Navalny".

By 25 January, courts of general jurisdiction in Moscow received 448 cases of administrative offenses; 441 of which were under Article 20.2 (violating protest rules) of the Administrative Code and 7 under Part 1 of Article 19.3 (failure to follow a lawful order or demand of a police officer, serviceman or official).

A Russian TikToker and his friends were detained for allegedly vandalizing an FSB car in Moscow during the protests. A widely circulated video showed protesters attacking the car, with state media reporting that the driver was hospitalized with a serious eye injury. On 26 January, it was reported that 20 criminal cases were opened by the Investigative Committee following the protests, with the majority of them under violence against authorities. On 28 January, the Investigative Committee also opened a criminal case against Volkov under "persuading minors to commit unlawful acts".

A woman who was kicked by a riot policeman during the protest in a widely circulated video was hospitalized again after her condition worsened. After she was released from hospital the day after the protest, she said she accepted the apology from the officer, who visited her in hospital, however she later said she did so because she wanted to be left alone. The St. Petersburg prosecutor's office said it was investigating the incident, while Vyacheslav Volodin, the Chairman of the State Duma, defended the police officer, saying he was "being prevented from performing his duties".

Russian police days later searched Navalny's apartment according to Navalny's team, ahead of another nationwide protest on 31 January. Navalny's brother Oleg was present in the apartment, who was taken away by the police following the search. The FBK also said that officers searched its headquarters and the "Navalny Live" studio, as well as the apartment of Kira Yarmysh and Navalny's doctor Anastasia Vasilyeva. The head of the FBK, Ivan Zhdanov, said that the Ministry of Internal Affairs carried out the searches within the framework of Article 236 of the Criminal Code of Russia related to violations of sanitary and epidemiological standards.

Navalny's coordinator in Nizhny Novgorod, Roman Tregubov, was arrested on 28 January and the next day was sentenced to five days in jail. On 30 January, the day before protests would begin again, a video of him was published where he announced his resignation and urged people not to go to the protests. His lawyer stated that he received threats before the video was recorded and also shared a photo of a letter written by him, addressed to the local district attorney and the head of the city's regional court, where he said that "statements, testimonies, or appeals" coming from him without the presence of his lawyer should be considered to be "obtained under torture, pressure, or some other outside compulsion". Other videos by the Investigative Committee were also published earlier featuring apologies by detained protesters who allegedly attacked law enforcement.

=== 31 January ===
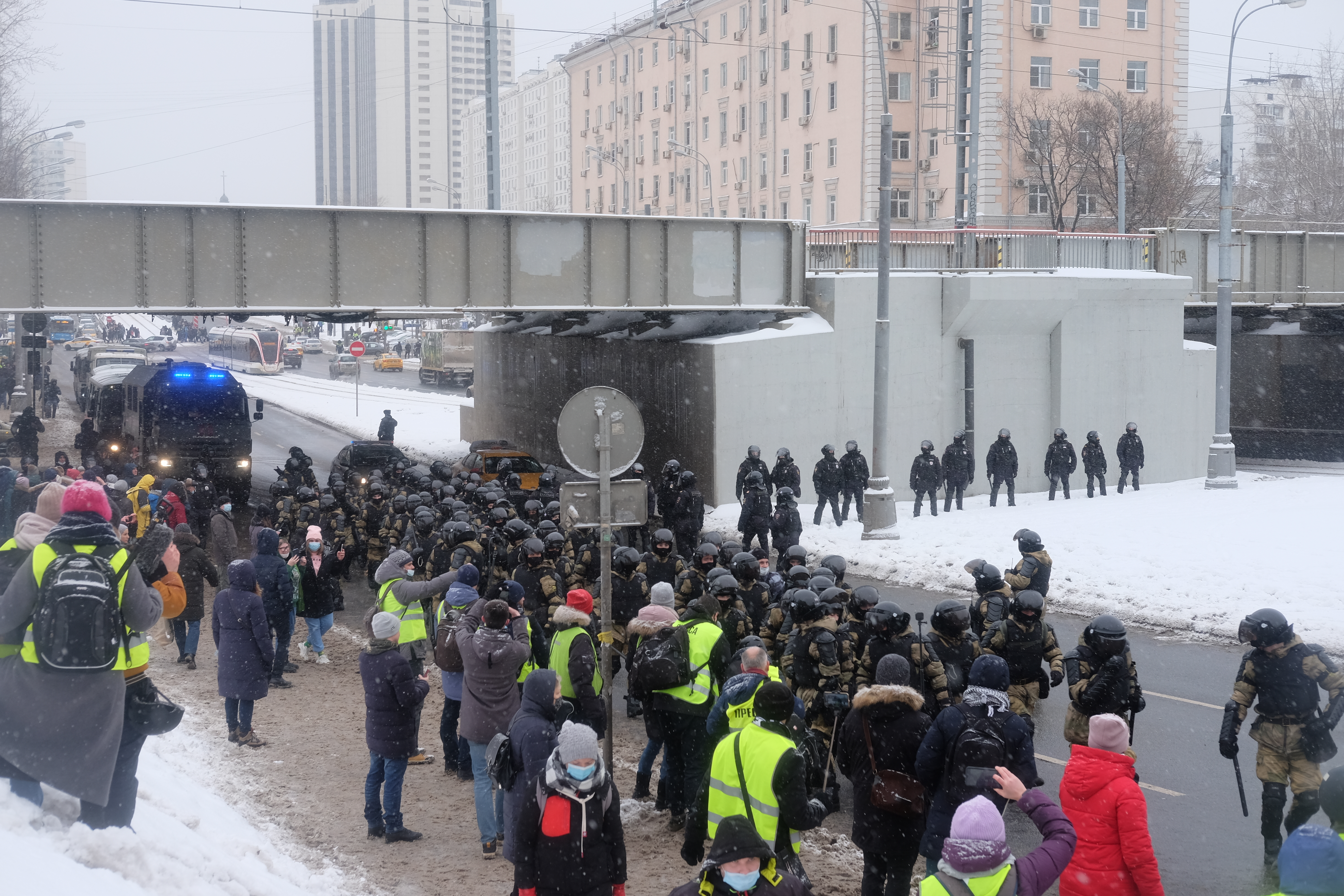
Rusakovskaya Street, Moscow

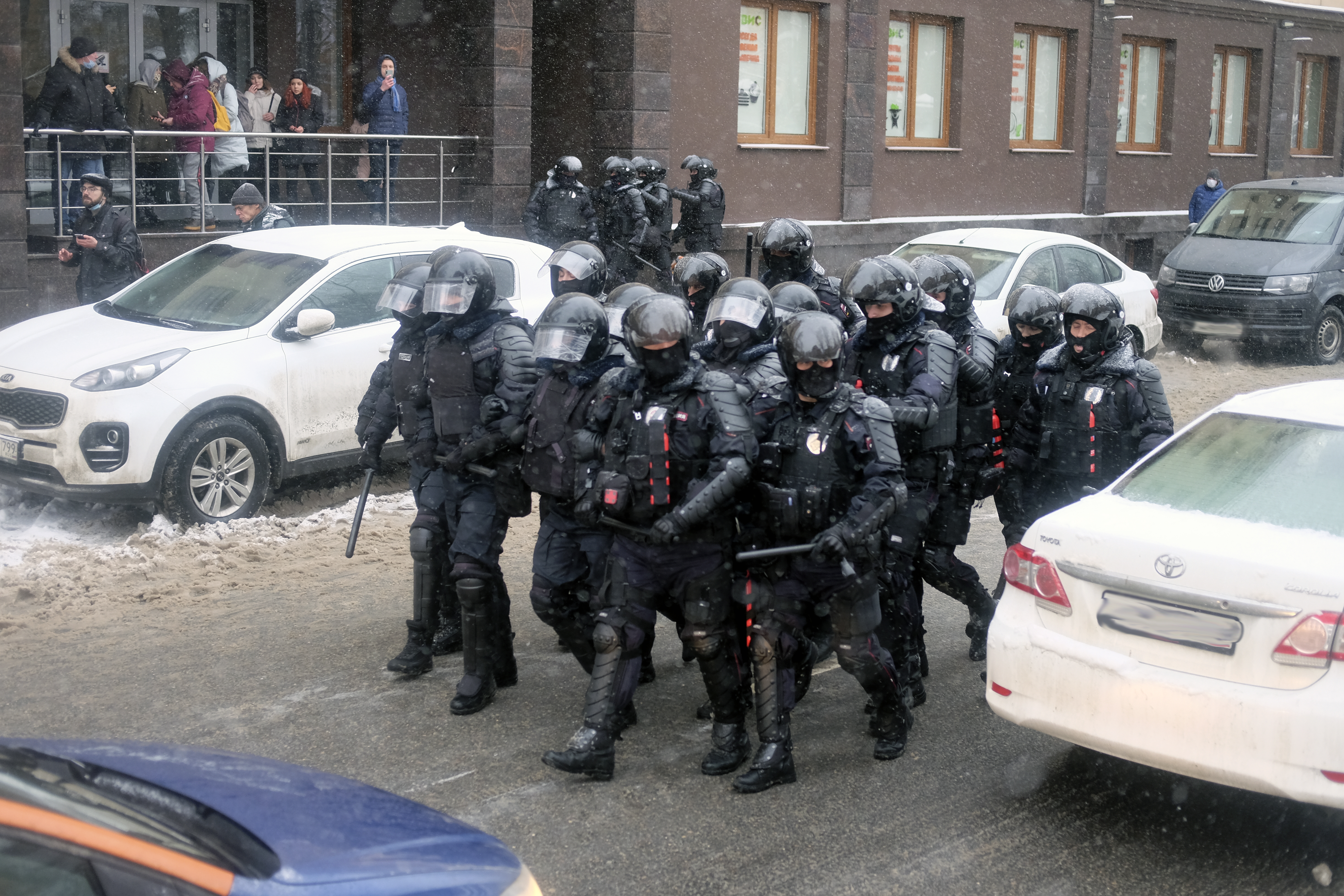
Matrosskaya Tishina, Moscow

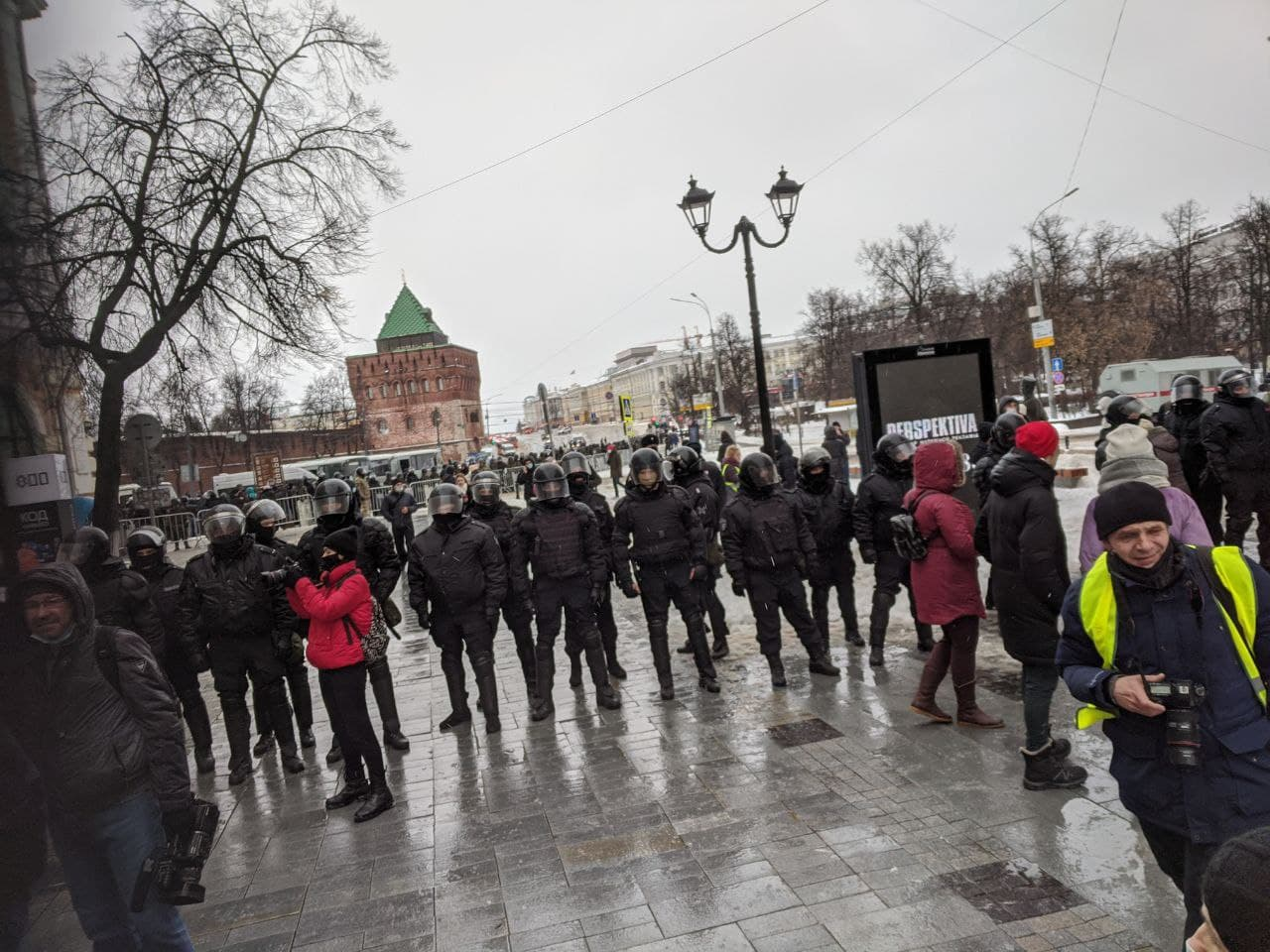
Minin and Pozharsky Square, Nizhny Novgorod

In Moscow, before protests began, authorities closed the lobbies of several metro stations in the city center (including Aleksandrovsky Sad, Okhotny Ryad, Teatralnaya, Ploshchad Revolyutsii, Kuznetsky Most, Lubyanka and Kitay-gorod) and restricted movement in parts of the city center, including the closure of restaurants and shops. The FSB building in Lubyanka Square was also cordoned off. Protest organizers changed the start of the rally to the Sukharevskaya and Krasnye Vorota metro stations. Police began detaining protesters by the stations, and the entrances and exits to the stations were then closed at the request of the police. The location was then changed to Komsomolskaya Square. The entrance and exit to the Krasnoselskaya and Sokolniki stations were then closed. Protesters then moved towards Matrosskaya Tishina, where Navalny was being held. Alexei Navalny's wife, Yulia Navalnaya, was detained again after attending the protest in Sokolniki; she was released several hours later and a protocol on violation of the protest law was drawn up against her. After police began mass arrests and dispersed protesters outside Matrosskaya Tishina, protesters returned to Komsomolskaya Square. Police then blocked off Olkhovskaya Street, trapping protesters. Opposition politician Ilya Yashin was detained.

In St. Petersburg, protest organizers moved the rally to Pionerskaya Square after authorities closed off Nevsky Prospekt. Protesters gathered near the Bryantsev Youth Theatre. The rapper Oxxxymiron attended the city's protest on his birthday and was later detained by police; he was later released. Protesters then moved to Sennaya Square where clashes between police and protesters broke out, and police used tear gas after protesters tried to rescue detainees. Police also reportedly used stun guns and a video of a police officer taking out his pistol and pointing it was published. After the dispersal of the protesters on Pionerskaya Square, protesters went along Zagorodny Prospekt towards Moskovsky Prospekt. Protesters then moved to outside the building of the city's legislative assembly, where they clashed with police and were forcibly dispersed. Protesters then moved back near the Bryantsev Youth Theatre where organizers announced the end of the rally and protesters were finally dispersed by police.

In Nizhny Novgorod, the National Guard and police blocked Minin and Pozharsky Square. The Gorkovskaya metro station was also closed. Detentions of protesters began in the afternoon on Bolshaya Pokrovskaya Street, near the former Oktyabr cinema. The journalist Alexander Pichugin was also detained there. The protesters left the street and began to gather in Minin and Pozharsky Square near the monument to Kuzma Minin. OMON and police pushed the protesters out of the square.

In Yekaterinburg, most metro stations were closed (from Prospekt Kosmonavtov to Ploshchad 1905 Goda). The former mayor of the city, Yevgeny Roizman, participated in the city's protest again despite a warning from the prosecutor's office. Around 7,000 protesters gathered in the city according to media estimates.

According to Tayga.info, around 6,000 protesters gathered in Novosibirsk, more than in the previous protest.

The state communications watchdog, Roskomnadzor, warned media outlets about heavy fines for "spreading fakes concerning unauthorized rallies", including publishing "inflated figures on the number of participants in illegal rallies".

According to OVD-Info, 5,611 people were detained, with over 1,800 of them in Moscow and over 1,300 of them in St. Petersburg. Also according to OVD-Info, at least 82 journalists were detained. Several demonstrators were hospitalized due to injuries such as bone fracture. A deaf-mute Saint Petersburg man was fined for "chanting slogans".

=== 2 February ===
Supporters of Navalny gathered outside the Moscow City Court, where the court was considering a request from the Federal Penitentiary Service (FSIN) to replace Navalny's suspended sentence with a jail sentence. Navalny was charged with violating a suspended sentence he received in 2014 while he was in Germany, a sentence that the European Court of Human Rights (ECHR) in 2017 previously ruled as "arbitrary and unreasonable". According to OVD-Info, 354 people were detained at the time, including four in Izhevsk.

The court ruled that Navalny's three-and-a-half-year suspended sentence was to be replaced with a prison sentence, minus the amount of time he spent under house arrest, meaning he would spend over two and a half years in a penal colony.

Following the verdict, Navalny's team called for immediate protests near the Kremlin at Manezhnaya Square in Moscow. Large numbers of riot police were deployed to the square and other areas in central Moscow. Police then cordoned off Manezhnaya Square and Pushkinskaya Square. Red Square was also closed earlier. The Okhotny Ryad, Teatralnaya and Ploshchad Revolyutsii metro stations were then also closed. Around a thousand protesters gathered at Tverskaya Street and two thousand were estimated to have marched down Petrovskiy Pereulok. The main group of protesters then headed to Pushkin Square. Police dispersed the protesters with force and there were instances of police violence.

In St. Petersburg, the Gostiny Dvor and Nevsky Prospekt metro stations were closed. The Mayakovskaya and Ploshchad Vosstaniya metro stations were also later closed.

According to OVD-Info, 1,463 people in total were detained, including over 1,180 in Moscow and 280 in St. Petersburg.

==== Aftermath ====
On 4 February, Leonid Volkov, Navalny's chief of staff, announced that protests would be suspended until at least spring to focus on the parliamentary elections in autumn. He said: "If we go out every week, thousands more will be detained, and hundreds more beaten... The work of the regional headquarters will be paralyzed and it will be impossible to work on elections. This is not what Alexei wants from us. Alexei has asked us to concentrate on this autumn". He also said that his team would work on getting Navalny out of prison using "foreign policy methods" including working to ensure that foreign leaders put pressure on Putin and his government to release Navalny.

On 6 February, the Russian government expelled three diplomats, each from Germany, Poland and Sweden for allegedly participating in the protests on 23 January, leading to protest from the United States and EU leaders. On 8 February, the governments of Germany, Poland, and Sweden each expelled a Russian diplomat in retaliation.

On 8 February, a Saratov lawmaker from the Communist Party, Nikolai Bondarenko, was detained on charges of violating protest rules. His colleagues said he attended the protests on 31 January as an observer. Olga Alimova, the Saratov regional branch leader of the Communist Party, linked Bondarenko's detention with his stated plans to run for the State Duma elections later in the year, where he would compete with State Duma speaker Vyacheslav Volodin and is considered a strong challenger. The leader of the Communist Party, Gennady Zyuganov, said he would defend him in court and fight for his release.

On 9 February, Volkov announced new courtyard protests on 14 February in what he said was a "completely different format", shifting from street protests to avoid direct confrontation with police. Volkov invited supporters to gather in courtyards and hold up their phones with the flashlight on during the evening. Volkov stated: "Hundreds of thousands of people took to the Russian streets on 23 January and 31 January. The response was an unprecedented wave of violence and repression... We need to find a way to overcome it and hold an event that riot police could not prevent and everyone could attend". He also addressed his earlier remarks on protests being suspended, saying: "My poorly worded phrase was interpreted by everyone that the protests are cancelled. That was quite a difficult moment". Dmitry Peskov, upon being questioned whether or not such actions would be considered illegal, was quoted saying: "We won't be playing cat and mouse with them".

On 11 February, Russian federal prosecutors warned against participation and incitement of unauthorized mass demonstrations, threatening felony charges against Internet users who advocated "riots". On the same day, the state news agencies TASS and RIA Novosti reported, using the same quotes and quoting sources in law enforcement, that terrorist attacks were being prepared for the upcoming rallies with "the most experienced and trusted militants" being trained to commit crimes during the street actions. On 6 February, police carried out coordinated searches at more than thirty addresses in Saint Petersburg in an investigation into roads allegedly blocked during the 23 January protest. One of the addresses was registered to Open Russia regional council member Pavel Chuprunov, who was elsewhere during the search; computer equipment was seized.

=== 14 February ===
A number of actions against repression were held in Russia on Valentine's Day. In the action called "Love is stronger than fear" organized by Navalny's team, courtyard protests were held across Russia during the evening. A medic who worked at a coronavirus hospital in Moscow posted a widely-shared photo of him taking part in the flashlight protest, however said that he was fired the next day, saying "this is what they do to all dissenters in Russia".

In Moscow, hundreds of women formed a "chain of solidarity" along Arbat Street to support Navalny's wife and female victims of repression, taking inspiration from the women-led protests held in Belarus. Despite not being authorized, there was no police presence. A similar human chain took place in St. Petersburg at Voskresenskaya Naberezhnaya.

An authorized rally against repression was held in Kazan at Millennium Square, organized by representatives of Yabloko, PARNAS, and Left Front. Authorities permitted up to 200 participants, citing coronavirus restrictions, however Kommersant reported that around 1,000 people attended the rally. Protesters demanded the release of political prisoners including Navalny.

According to OVD-Info, 19 people in total were detained that day. Kremlin spokesman Dmitry Peskov said that there were no mass arrests because the pro-Navalny actions were held without breaking the law.

==== Aftermath ====
In March, Alexey Navalny's team launched a campaign for his release called "Freedom for Navalny!" where those who live in Russia may pledge to participate in an upcoming protest on the website of Navalny's team. Once the amount of pledges reach 500,000, Navalny's team will announce a date for the upcoming mass demonstration.

On 18 April, Navalny's team announced new protests nationwide for 21 April, saying that Navalny was being killed in prison and while the goal was to reach 500,000 pledges (with the number of pledges reaching over 450,000 that day), it was not possible to wait any longer. The date coincided with Putin's Presidential Address to the Federal Assembly.

=== 21 April ===
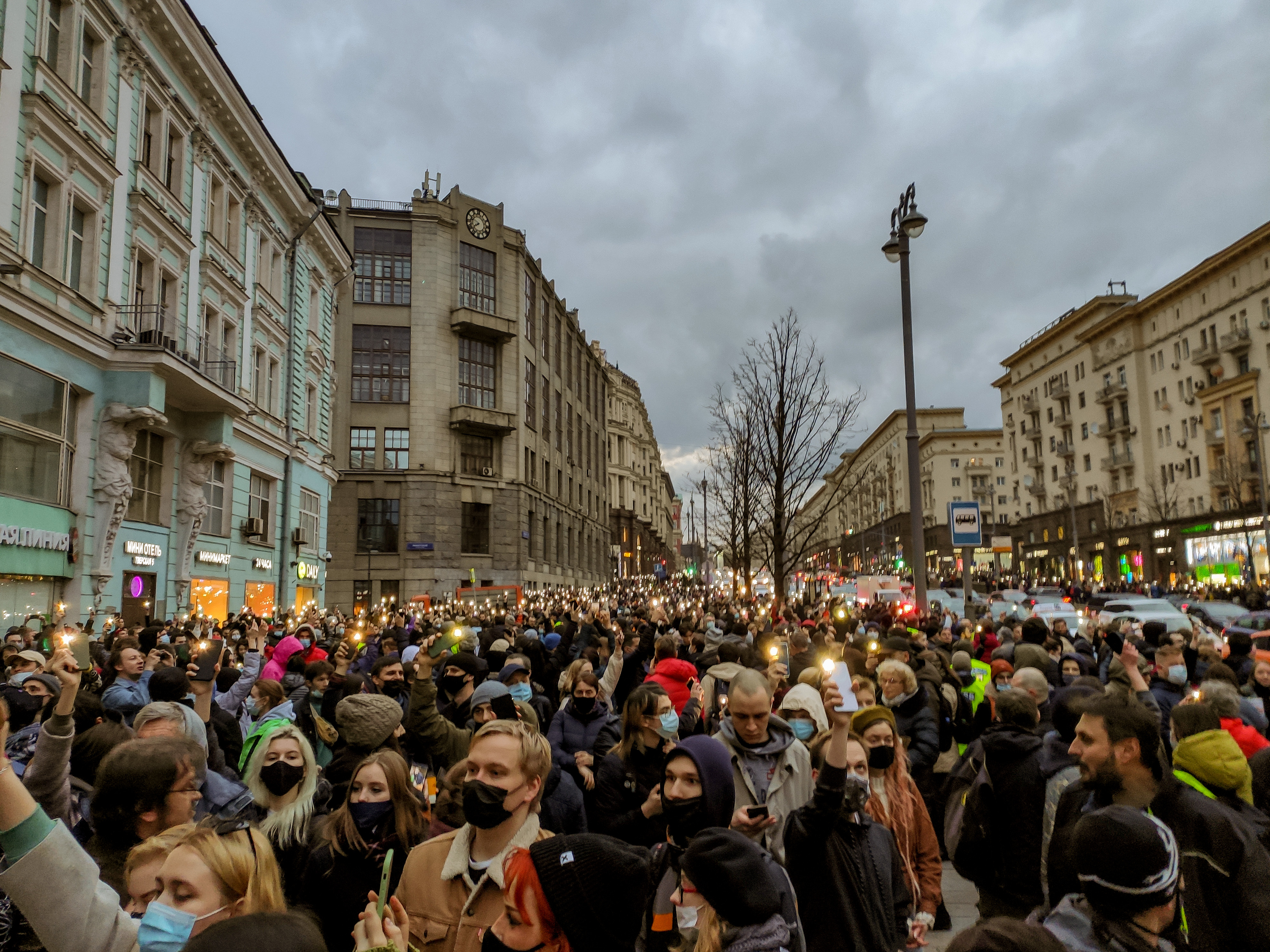
Tverskaya Street, Moscow

Prior to assigned start time of the nationwide protests, 19:00 Moscow time, many people had already begun protesting, with the largest demonstrations being in Irkutsk and Novosibirsk. 186 people were detained as of 17:00 Moscow time, with that number rising to 221 by 18:00. Within that time, large-scale demonstrations had begun in Irkutsk, Novosibirsk, Perm, and Yekaterinburg, with protests beginning to flare up in Moscow and Saint Petersburg, and police setting up barricades in many of the aforementioned cities. In Saint Petersburg, videos were recorded of protestors chanting "Putin is a killer".

Soon after the protests began, around 400 people across Russia were detained by the police. Around that time the number of protesters in Moscow and St. Petersburg had grown heavily, particularly in Tverskaya Street in Moscow. By that time Alexei Navalny's wife, Yulia Navalnaya, had joined the protesters in Moscow, followed by Alexei Navalny's brother, Oleg, some time later. Police gave a figure of 6,000 protesters in Manezhnaya Square, while independent observers and local media gave substantially higher estimates.

In St. Petersburg, the police began mass detaining protesters in Sennaya Square around 20:29 MSK. By that time the MVD gave a figure of 4,500 protesters in St. Petersburg. As the police mass detained protesters in Sennaya Square, the police managed to disperse the crowd, only for the crowd to relocate to Rubinstein Street.

According to OVD-Info, 1,985 people were detained, with 839 of them detained in St. Petersburg and 170 detained in Ufa.

==== Aftermath ====
On 23 April, Alexei Navalny announced that he would end his 24-day hunger strike, following his examination conducted by civilian doctors not affiliated with the Corrective Colony in Pokrov who had warned that he could die if he continued his hunger strike. He also praised the protests and the support he received from around the world, while also noting solidarity hunger strikes conducted by some of Navalny's supporters. Navalny also noted that the process of ending the hunger strike would also take 24 days.

On 27 April, two journalists from the independent news outlets Ekho Moskvy and TV Rain were detained by police in their homes after covering the protests on 21 April, with one being released and ordered to appear for questioning later.

On 12 May, opposition politician and former mayor of Yekaterinburg, Yevgeny Roizman, was sentenced to nine days in jail for "organizing an unsanctioned event" on 31 January and 21 April through his Twitter account. The next day, the sentence was reduced to 24 hours after an appeal by his lawyers. Roizman was also ordered to 30 hours of compulsory labor.

On 13 May, Volkov stated that future protests would not be staged in advance and would instead be "unprepared", citing a persecution of protest organizers and protesters.

On 9 June, Navalny's political network, including his headquarters and the FBK, were designated as extremist organizations and liquidated by the Moscow City Court.

== Reactions ==
=== Domestic ===
Kremlin spokesman Dmitry Peskov accused the United States of interfering in Russian domestic affairs. The U.S. embassy sent an alert warning American citizens about the location of protests in Moscow and U.S. officials also criticized the police crackdown. Peskov also downplayed the scale of the protests, saying "few people came out" and that "many people vote for Putin". The Russian Foreign Ministry also summoned the U.S. ambassador over the demonstration alert. It was reported that Deputy Foreign Minister Sergei Ryabkov informed U.S. Ambassador John Sullivan that Russia considered the alerts to be "direct interference in the internal affairs of our country". After protests began on 31 January, the Foreign Ministry again accused the United States of meddling in Russian internal affairs.

President Vladimir Putin, after being asked about his thoughts on the protests during a videoconference with students on Students Day, said that "everyone has the right to express their point of view within the legal framework. Anything outside the law is not just counterproductive, but also dangerous".

Navalny's chief of staff, Leonid Volkov, called the protests a "victory over fear" and a "real nationwide movement that unites a wide variety of people". He also said that "we are not dissidents" and that "we are fighting for the political majority".

==== Polls ====
According to a poll by the Levada Center carried out from 29 January to 2 February 2021, 21% of Russian respondents said they followed the protests closely, 59% said they heard about it, and 19% said they did not hear anything about it. 22% of respondents felt positive about the protests, 37% felt neutral, and 39% felt negative. 45% and 43% of respondents said that they expected further growth in protest activity with political demands or economic demands, respectively – the highest rate since 1998. However, only 15% and 17% expressed willingness to take part in political protests or economic protests, respectively – a drop compared to the last poll in November 2020.

According to a poll by the same pollster published on 13 May 2021, 11% of Russian respondents said they followed the 21 April protests closely, 61% said they heard about it, and 28% said they did not hear anything about it. 16% of respondents had positive attitudes to the 21 April protests, 42% were neutral, and 39% had negative attitudes.

==== Petitions ====
The human rights organisation OVD-Info created a petition against the "Fortress" plan, which was introduced in police sites in order to ban visits to the police department by "unauthorized persons", which, in turn, prevents the direct meeting of lawyers with their detainees.

A number of petitions including by Novaya Gazeta and Amnesty International were also created demanding for Navalny's freedom. A petition by Novaya Gazeta demanded a change to the law on rallies and demonstrations in accordance with the Constitution of the Russian Federation and to guarantee citizens the right of peaceful assembly. The petition by Novaya Gazeta demanding for Navalny's release was signed by over 200,000 people, including numerous celebrities and public figures. Amnesty International published a request for collective assistance in writing appeals in order to achieve justice in the case of Margarita Yudina, who was beaten during the protest. Petitions to bring to justice the security official who committed the violence was also filed by the Libertarian Party. A petition by Amnesty International that was signed by over 200,000 people was sent to the Kremlin.

In addition, several petitions were created demanding for the release of a Chechen protester, Said-Magomed Dzhumaev, who clashed with security forces in Moscow.

Marina Litvinenko, the widow of Alexander Litvinenko, created a petition calling for the Nobel Peace Prize to be awarded to Alexei Navalny.

=== International ===
U.S. State Department spokesman Ned Price condemned what he called "harsh tactics against protesters and journalists" and called on the Russian authorities to "release all those detained for exercising their universal rights". He also urged Russia to "fully cooperate with the international community's investigation into the poisoning of Aleksey Navalny and credibly explain the use of a chemical weapon on its soil".

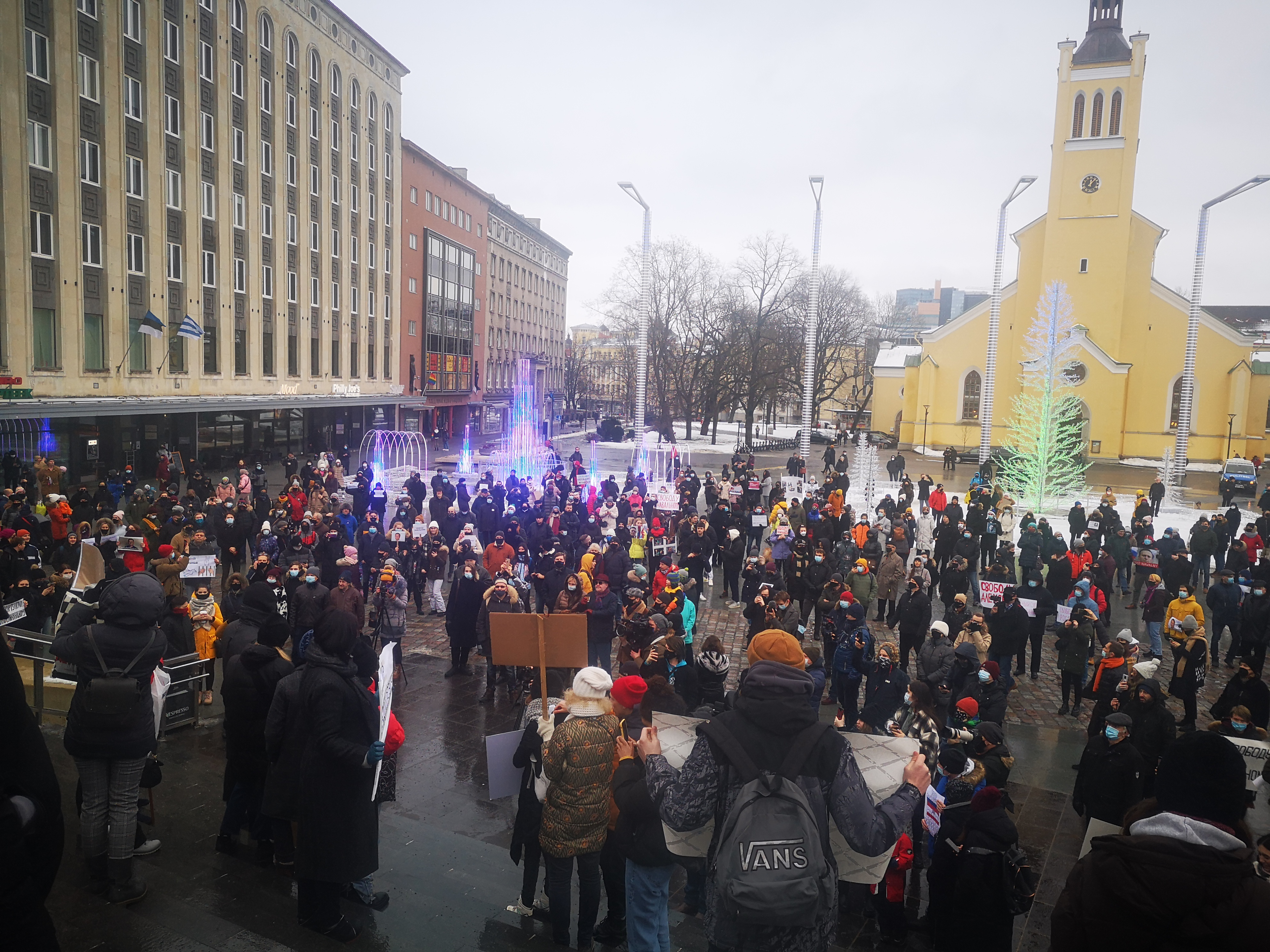
Freedom Square, Tallinn (Estonia)

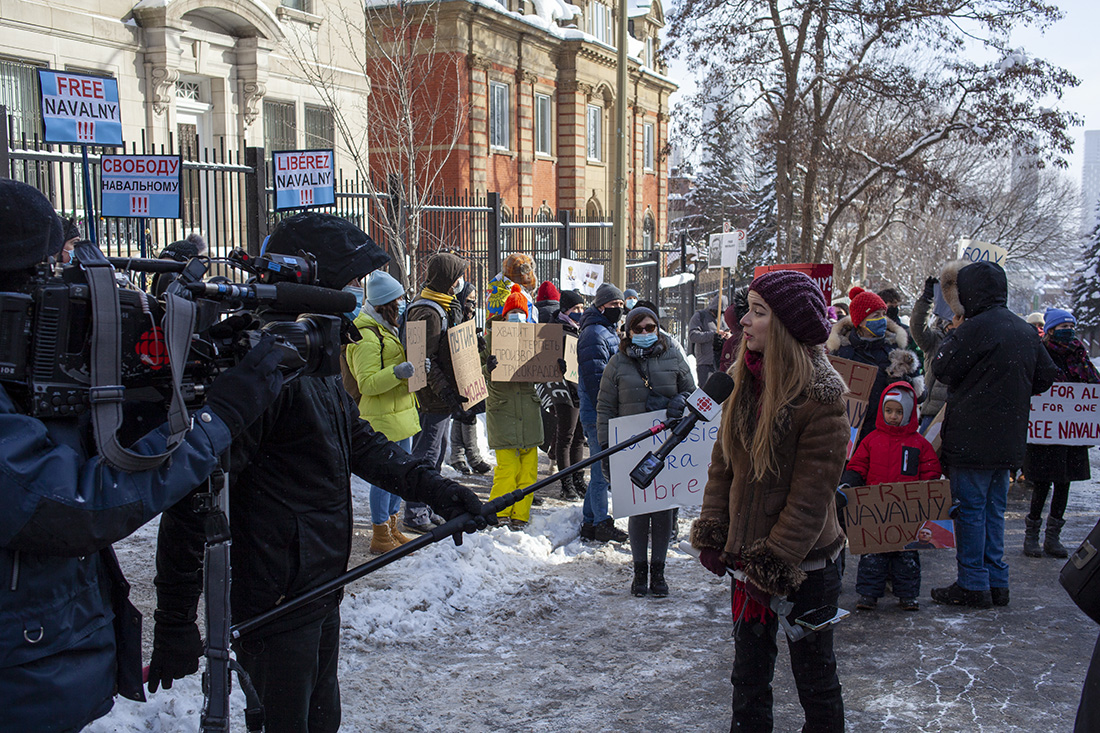
Consulate General of the Russian Federation in Montreal (Canada)

The EU's High Representative Josep Borrell said that he would press for the release of Navalny when he visits Moscow on 5 February 2021, saying that it would be "a good opportunity to discuss with my Russian counterpart all relevant issues, to pass clear messages on the current situation". EU foreign ministers debated sanctions on Russia however held off new sanctions for the time being.

British Foreign Secretary Dominic Raab condemned what he called was "the Russian authorities' use of violence against peaceful protesters and journalists". He also called on the Russian government to "release citizens detained during peaceful demonstrations". The British Foreign Ministry in a statement said that it was "deeply concerned by the detention of peaceful protesters" and that it was continuing to "monitor the situation closely".

Japanese Foreign Minister Toshimitsu Motegi urged the Russian government to release Navalny, calling for "transparency and bring the perpetrators' of Navalny's poisoning to justice. Motegi also states that "The Japanese government is closely watching (the situation) with concern. We want to request the release of Mr. Navalny and those who have been detained arbitrarily while engaging in peaceful demonstrations".

New York Rangers winger Artemi Panarin expressed his support for Navalny, and shortly after took absentee of leave following allegations he assaulted an 18-year old Russian in 2011. He states he believes the allegations are politically motivated.

==== Protests in other countries ====
23 January

Solidarity protests were also held in cities around the world on 23 January 2021, including Berlin, Munich, Paris, Prague, Kraków, Helsinki, London, Tallinn, The Hague, Denver, Vienna, Tel Aviv, Copenhagen, Melbourne, Sydney, Montreal and Tokyo.

- In The Hague, Netherlands, around 250 people gathered at a rally.
- In Berlin, Germany around 1,000 protesters were estimated to have gathered at a rally.
- In Copenhagen, Denmark around 150 people gathered in front of the Russian Embassy.
- In Stockholm, Sweden around 80 people gathered outside the Russian embassy. In Gothenburg, around 20 people gathered outside the Russian consulate.
- In Belgrade, Serbia around 10 people gathered outside the Church of Saint Sava before the police came because they "violated epidemiological measures".
- In Tel Aviv, Israel, around 1,500 to 2,000 people were estimated to have gathered at a rally near the Russian embassy. Due to COVID-related restrictions, the crowd was asked to disperse by the organizers. Several hundred demonstrators then moved towards the Russian embassy. Another 600 to 1000 protesters were estimated to have gathered at a rally in Haifa.
- In Moldova, there were protests in favor of Navalny but also some protests against him.
- In Guam, a group of about 15 people of the Russian-speaking minority protested for U.S. intervention.

31 January

The solidarity movement of Russian communities abroad further expanded, as a total of around 3,000 participated in rallies across several major European cities as well as Philadelphia and San Francisco. Rallies in support of Navalny were held in Australia and New Zealand. A rally in Sydney included people who disagreed with the protesters.

21 April

In solidarity with Navalny's hunger strike protests were held in a range of Russian and international cities among which are Rome, Riga, Tbilisi, London, Berlin, Hagatna and Tel Aviv.

On the US island of Guam, a protest took place against the autocratic rule of Vladimir Putin. The action took place at the Legislature in Hagatna, symbolizing a veto on Putin's message to the Federal Assembly.

== Gallery ==
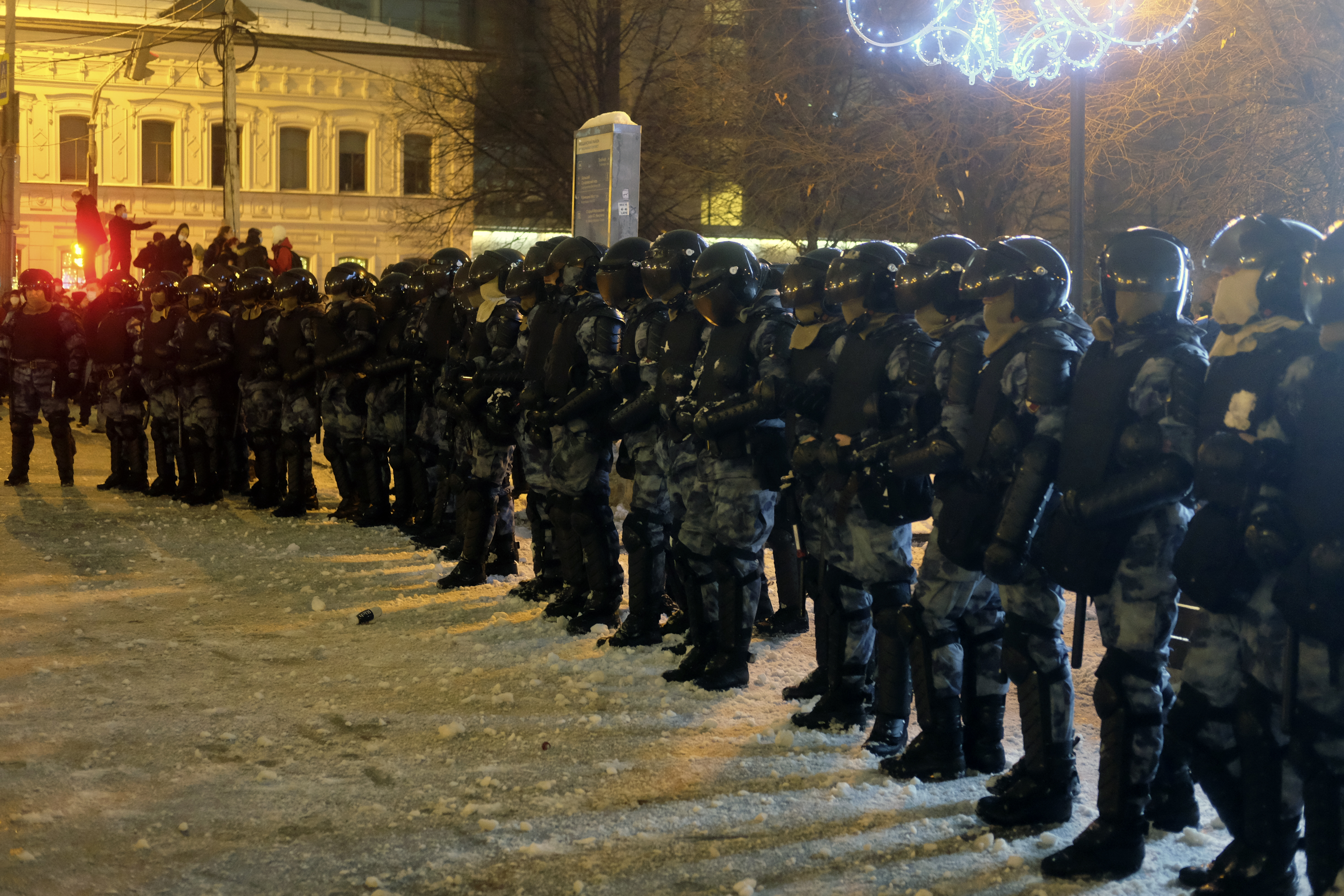
Tsvetnoy Boulevard, Moscow

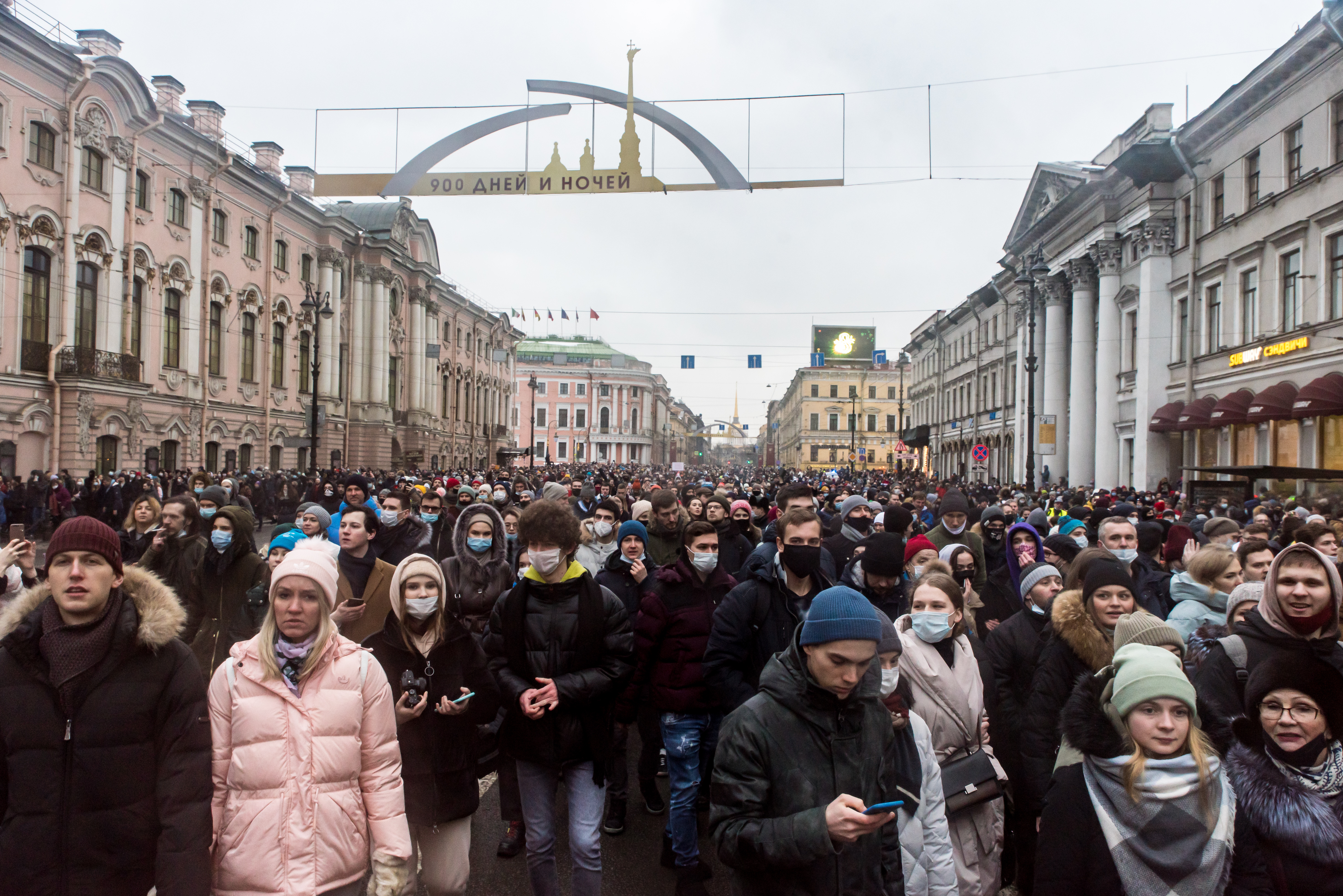
Nevsky Prospekt, Saint Petersburg

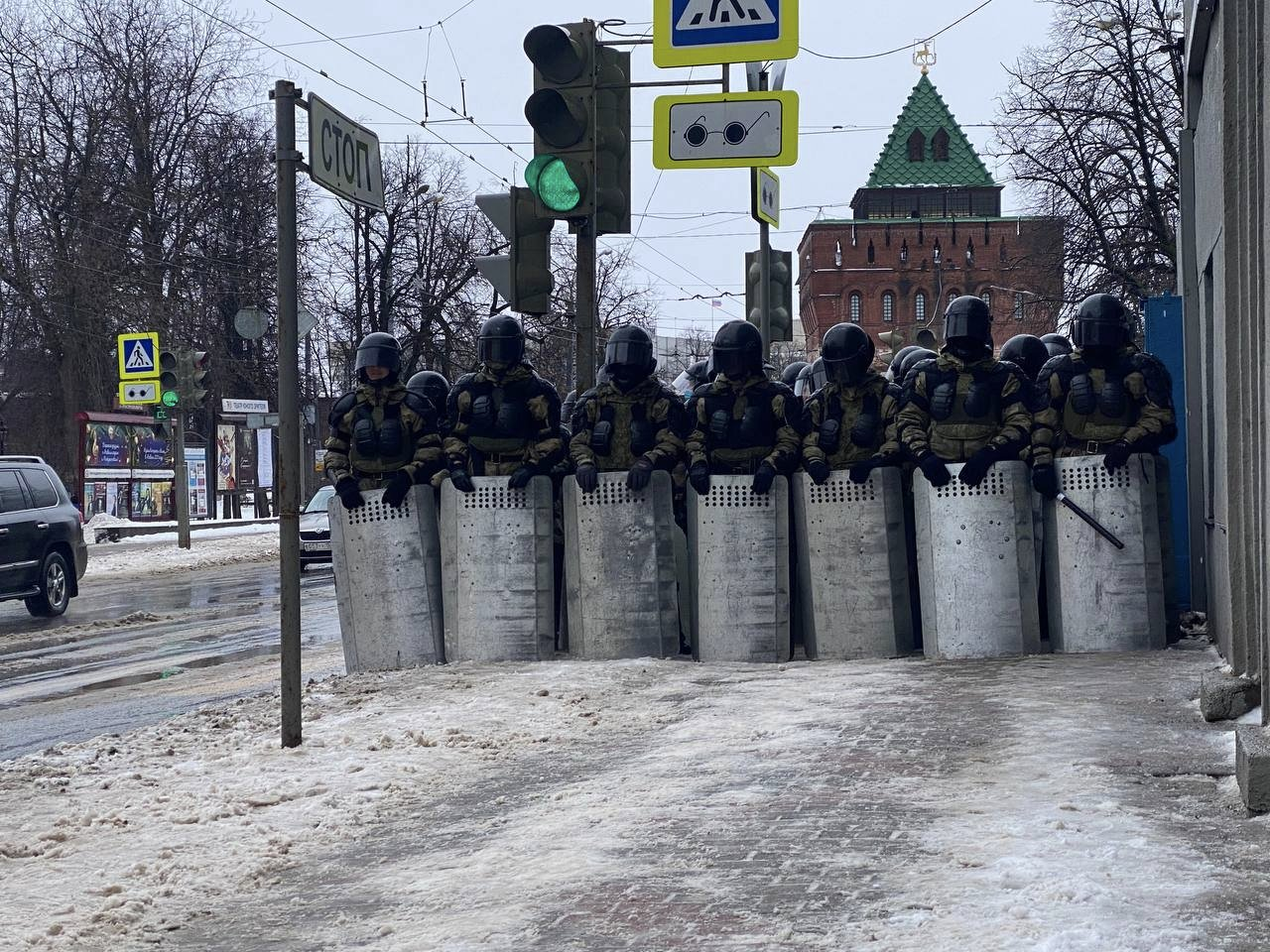
Minin and Pozharsky Square, Nizhny Novgorod

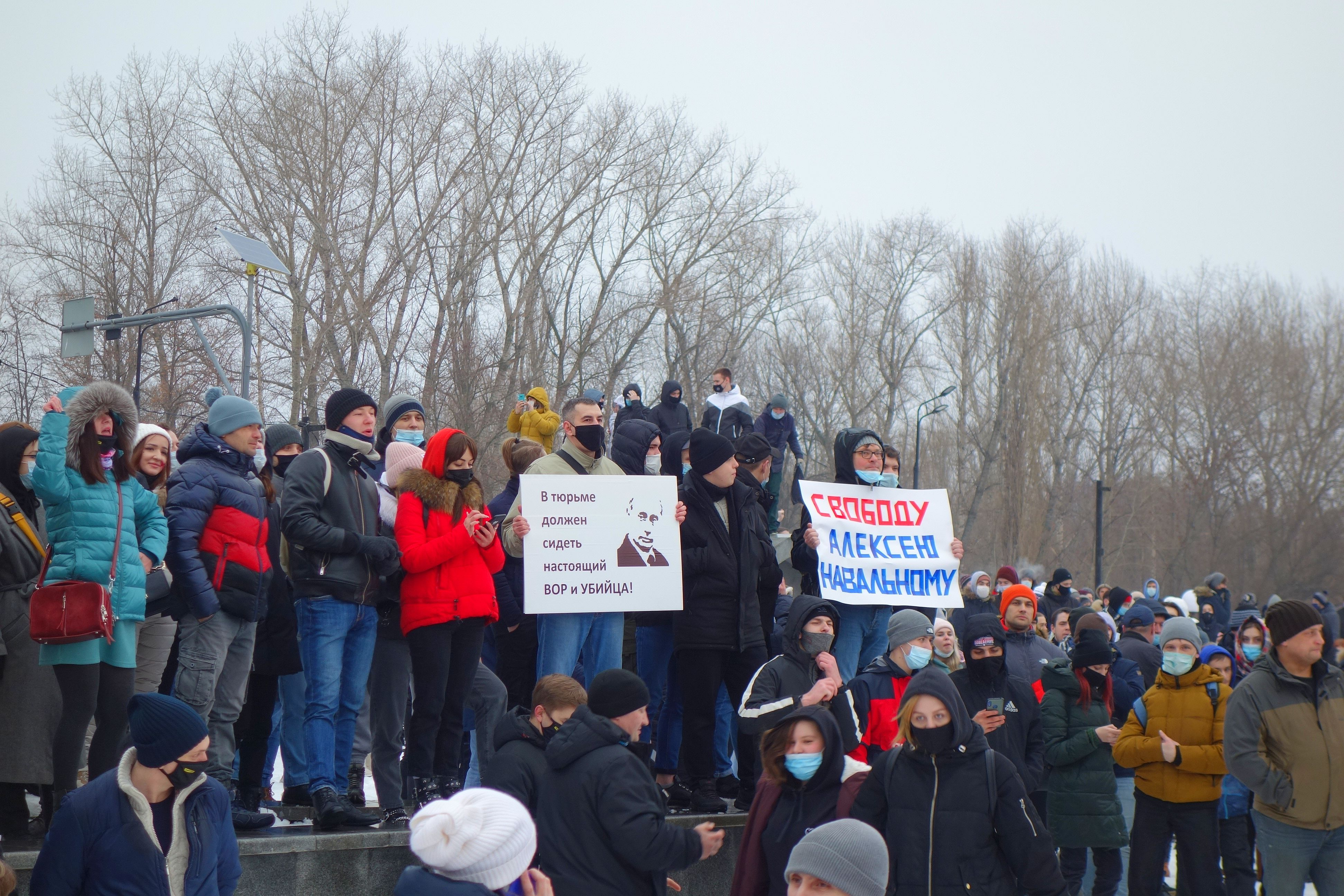
Peter the Great Square, Lipetsk

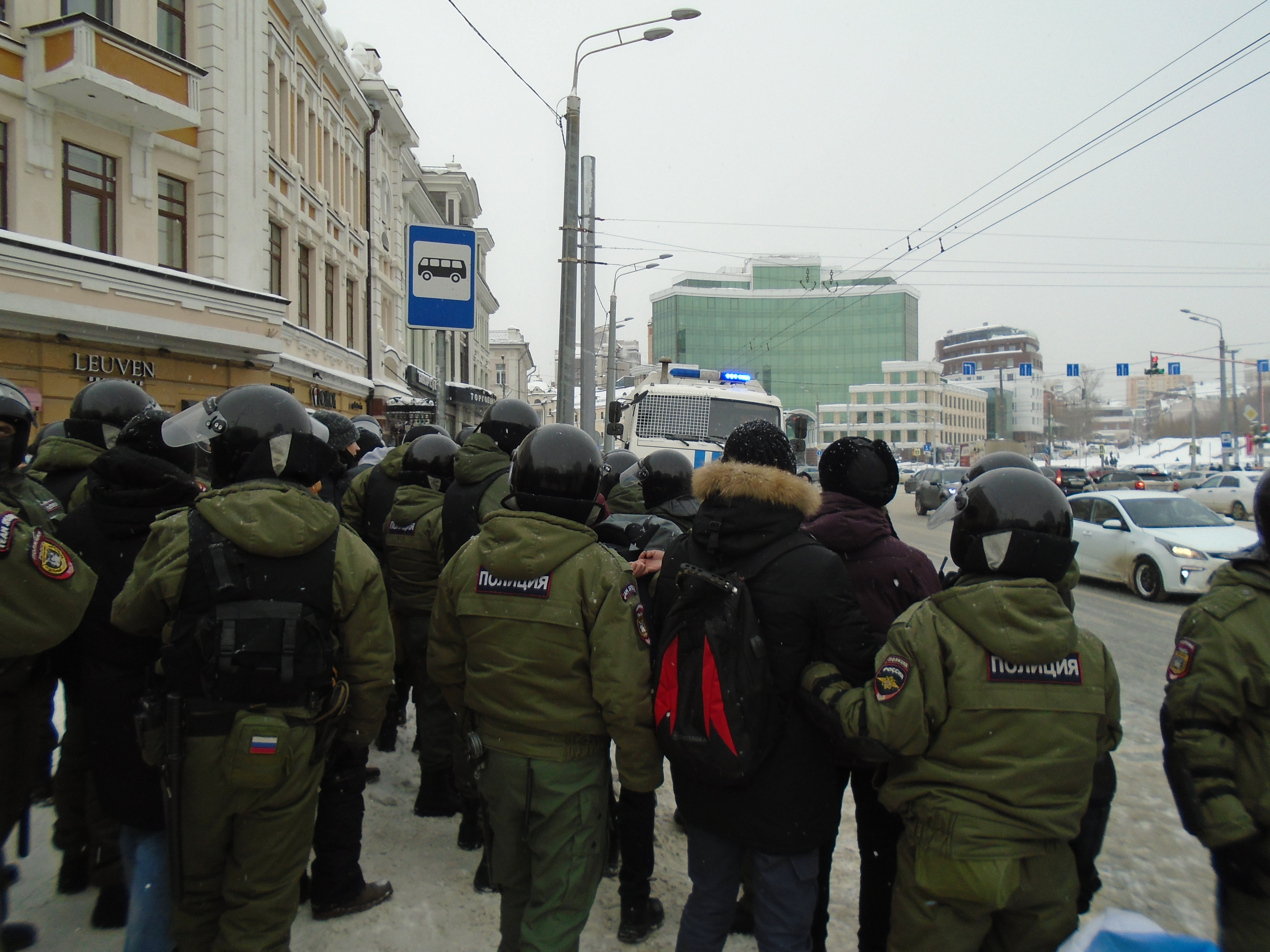
Bauman Street, Kazan

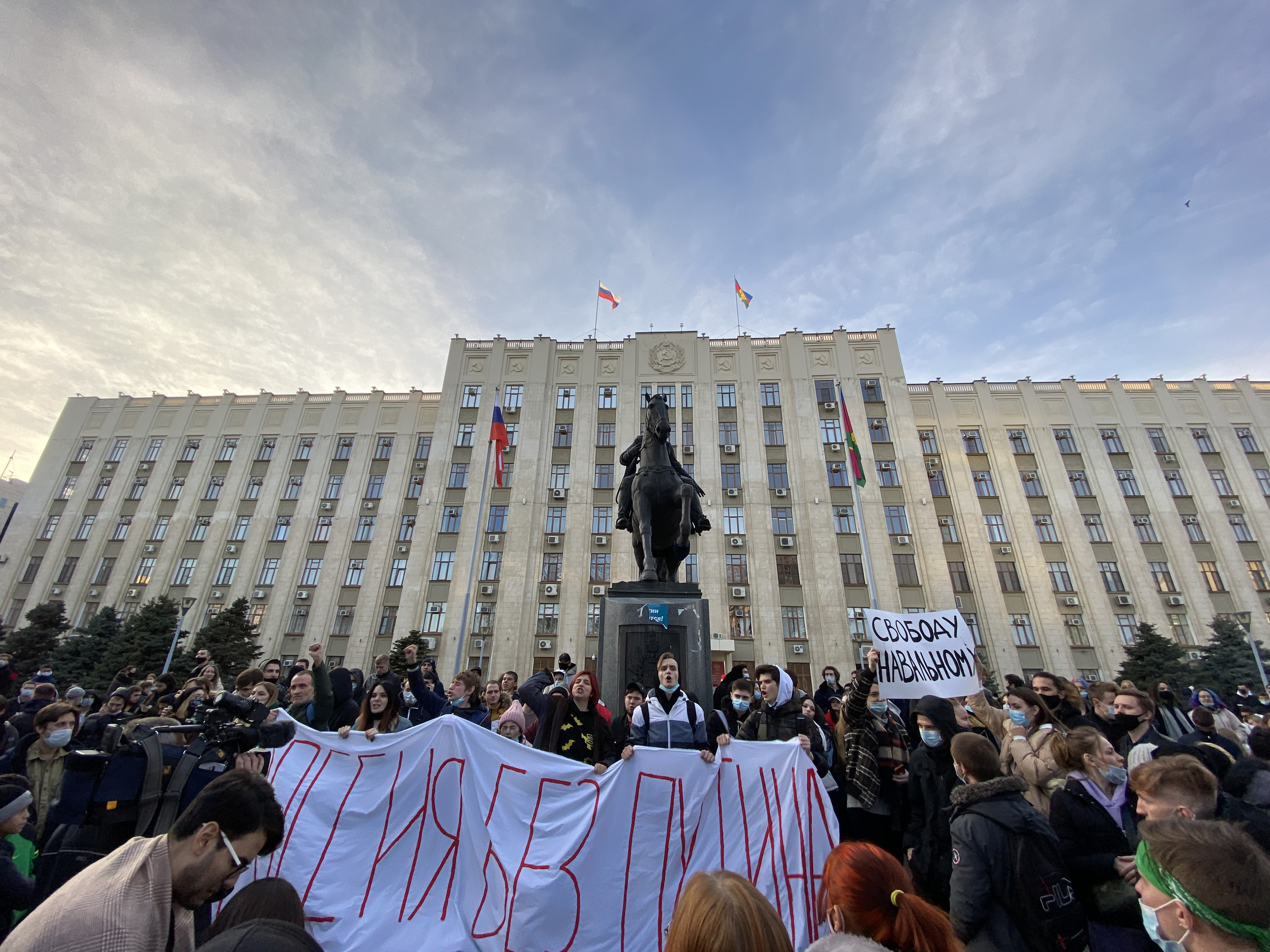
Ulitsa Krasnaya, Krasnodar

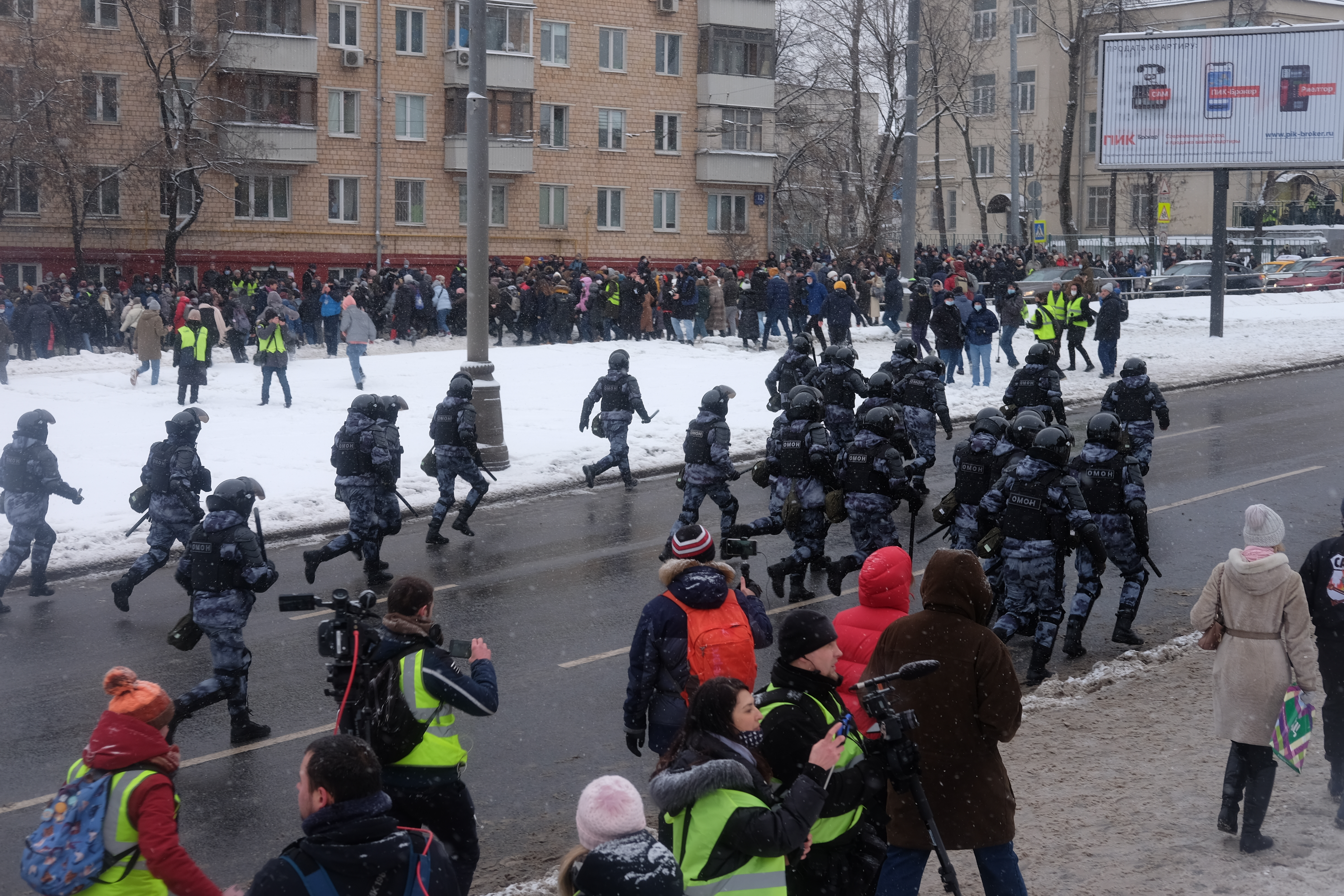
Sokolniki District, Moscow

== See also ==
- 2017–2018 Russian protests
- 2019 Moscow protests
- List of protests in the 21st century
