= Forced public apologies in Russia =

Practice in Russia

Forced public apologies in Russia are a practice of publishing videos in which a person or their relatives ask forgiveness for their words or actions. Usually the apologies are given under pressure, including threats and torture. The practice is particularly widespread in Chechnya, and more recently in the rest of the Russian Federation.

== History ==
Cases of coercion to public apologies happened in the post-Soviet states before, and not only in Russia; for example, in February 2014 fighters of Ukrainian «Berkut» were forced to ask for forgiveness for their actions against Euromaidan.

After Russian protests against Navalny's imprisonment in 2021, Russian security services published apologies of protestors, many of which appeared to have been given under duress. According to anthropologist Aleksandra Arkhipova, apologizing on camera damages the protester's image and lowers their support by the public.

=== Use in Chechnya ===
The practice is particularly widespread in Chechnya, where its systematic use began in 2007. The practice is associated with the rule of Ramzan Kadyrov.
