= Termless protest =

Decentralised political movement in Russia

Termless protest Бессрочный протест
- Founded: 9 September 2018; 8 years ago
- Ideology: Decentralization; Pluralism; Direct democracy Liberal democracy Environmentalism
- Political position: Catch-all
- National affiliation: Union of Protest Groups
- Colours: White; Blue; Red
- Slogan: "We don't believe in politicians. We believe in ourselves." (Russian: "Мы не верим в политиков. Мы верим в себя.")

Website
- bessrochka.com

The Termless protest (Russian: Бессрочный протест; Bessrochnyy protest) or Bessrochka (Russian: Бессрочка), — is the name used by the organizers of the telegram channel Union of Protest Groups to designate the format of street actions. For the first time this format was announced in June 2018 by the Union of Protest Groups in its telegram channel.

== History ==
On 16 June 2018, a bill on pension reform in Russia was submitted to the State Duma. The project for reforming the pension system in the country provided for a gradual increase in the retirement age for most citizens from 1 January 2019.

The impending reform displeased a significant part of Russians, and street protests began in various cities of the country. One of these protests was the all-Russian protest on 9 September on a single voting day, appointed by politician Alexei Navalny. In Moscow, the mayor's office refused to hold a rally on Tverskaya Street, without offering an alternative venue. The Moscow rally did take place on Pushkinskaya Square. It was attended by several thousand people and it was dispersed as inconsistent with the authorities. However, in the evening, several young people gathered at the monument to Pushkin. They announced the start of an termless protest action. At midnight, Rosgvardiya soldiers arrived at the monument and detained some of the protesters. The remaining 15 people went to spend the night at the nearby monument to Tvardovsky on Strastnoy Boulevard. They called on all those who were not indifferent to join them, put forward a number of demands: the cancellation of the pension reform, the resignation of the president and the government, the abolition of Article 282 of the Criminal Code, the dissolution of Roskomnadzor, and decided to stay on the street until the requirements were met.

On the morning of 10 September, police in Moscow demanded that the protesters in Strastnoy Boulevard remove the unfolded posters, and the protesters complied. Then, during the day, protesters were detained several times, but they did not disperse, new people arrived. In the evening of September 10, several people remained at the monument to Rachmaninov. The members of the «Bessrochka» decided to gather for protest actions every day, organize processions, and campaign in the streets. Constant movement from place to place helped them avoid arrest. One of the indefinite campaigns was as follows. Near the phone store a few days before the sale of the new iPhone model, people gathered to buy a new phone faster than anyone else. Some of them tried to sell their place. Participants of the indefinite protest sat down with them, holding cardboard boxes with the words "Selling 63 years of pension", "Buy conscience", "Selling second place in a paddy wagon". During the action "Clown Justice", the activists disguised themselves as clowns, came to the courthouse, stood in a semicircle and announced comic sentences to their contemporaries. Moscow "bessrochniks" held hundreds of actions, they continue to participate in them to this day, but the idea of continuous protest was abandoned back in 2018.

On the same night, 9–10 September 2018, an open-ended protest began in St. Petersburg after a similar rally on the Field of Mars. Petersburg participants, as well as their Moscow colleagues, were detained by the police. The protesters were drawn up protocols under part 5 of article 20.2 of the KoAP "violation by a participant of a public event of the established procedure for holding an assembly, rally, demonstration, march or picket". The capitals set an example for the regions, soon indefinite protests began in dozens of Russian cities.

The headquarters of Alexei Navalny did not support the participants in the termless protest during the events of September–October 2018, Navalny refrained from speaking about them publicly.

In September 2018, Dmitry Gudkov met with Moscow participants of the termless protest, who spoke positively about the platform and compared it with the 2012 Occupy Abai campaign.

In 2019, participants in the ternless protest took an active part in mass actions against the construction of a church in the park on Oktyabrskaya Square in Yekaterinburg. In the same year, they installed fake "gravestones" of Vladimir Putin in Naberezhnye Chelny and Yekaterinburg.

== Ideology, goals and principles ==
The bessrochniks' activities are based on the conviction that only a constant peaceful street protest without clear leaders and a coordination center will change the political system of Russia. That is why the bessrochniks attach great importance to the dissemination of information about self-organization and the principles of building a civil society.

Termless protest is characterized by the absence of obvious leaders, hierarchy (all important decisions are made by voting) and charter, exclusively peaceful forms of protest, coordination of actions through anonymous chats in Telegram. There are nominally indefinite offices in many cities of the country, but in most cases this is a formality. Anyone can call themselves a participant. The platform's website states:

Termless protest is the idea of self-organization of civil society on the basis of: peaceful protest, decentralized association, as well as a variety of opinions, political views and demands on the state. For self-organization, activists are developing an online and offline platform, which is already used by more than 30 regions. It is run by everyone and has no hierarchy.

=== List of principles ===
List of principles:

- Decentralization - Lack of clear and public leaders, representatives and decision-making centers.
- Peaceful protest - the use of theory and practice to achieve political goals without the use of violence and anti-constitutional methods.
- Pluralism
- Absence of term
- Self-organization

== Notable representatives ==
A prominent representative of the termless protest is Olga Misik, a young activist who became a symbol of resistance in Russia during the Moscow protests for fair elections.

The reason was her performance in front of a line of riot police. A seventeen-year-old schoolgirl, dressed in a bulletproof vest with the inscription "Bessrochka", sat down in front of the officer and read article 31 of the Constitution, which declares the right of citizens to peaceful assembly. After that Misik was detained.

The image of a teenage girl sitting in front of OMON with the Russian Constitution on her knees went viral. It is perceived as a metaphor for young people's disappointment in the political situation in the country and is compared to the iconic photograph of "Tank Man" during the 1989 Tiananmen Square protests and massacre. The image went viral and was quoted in many foreign media outlets. "Has the activist gained some prominence?" and was compared with the Swedish environmental activist Greta Thunberg:

"I didn't expect any feedback from anyone. I just wanted to remind them that we are here for peaceful purposes and without weapons, but we are not. It didn't even occur to me that anyone other than them would hear it", she said. "Then, after the riot police pushed away all the protesters, I sat down on the ground and started reading our constitutional rights again, indicating that what was happening here was illegal." "There was neither a rally nor a crowd of people in this place. They grabbed my arms and legs and dragged me down the street and through the underpass", she said. "I shouted that they were hurting me, but they said they knew better."

== Public response ==
Participants are persecuted by the police and regularly detained. Alexander Mironov, a member of the St. Petersburg Group for Assistance to Detainees, believes that the indefinite protest is of interest to the police as an opportunity to make another criminal case, similar to the case of "New Greatness". Despite the small number of participants, the indefinite protest attracted the attention of the media and Russian politicians.

== See also ==
- 2011–2013 Russian protests
- 2018 Russian pension protests
- 2019 Moscow protests

== Books ==
- Alexandra Baeva. "We just want to talk with Serezha": how the perpetrators of the "indefinite period" are persecuted // OVD-Info. 2018-11-08.
- Igor Pushkarev. "If I find such people, I will act as the moderator of the Maidan" // Znak.com. 2018-09-17.
- Andrey Nikolaev. HYIP loop for "indefinite protest" // Agency of Federal Investigations. 2019-05-25.
