= Latvians in Russia =

Latvians in Russia Krievijas latvieši Российские латыши
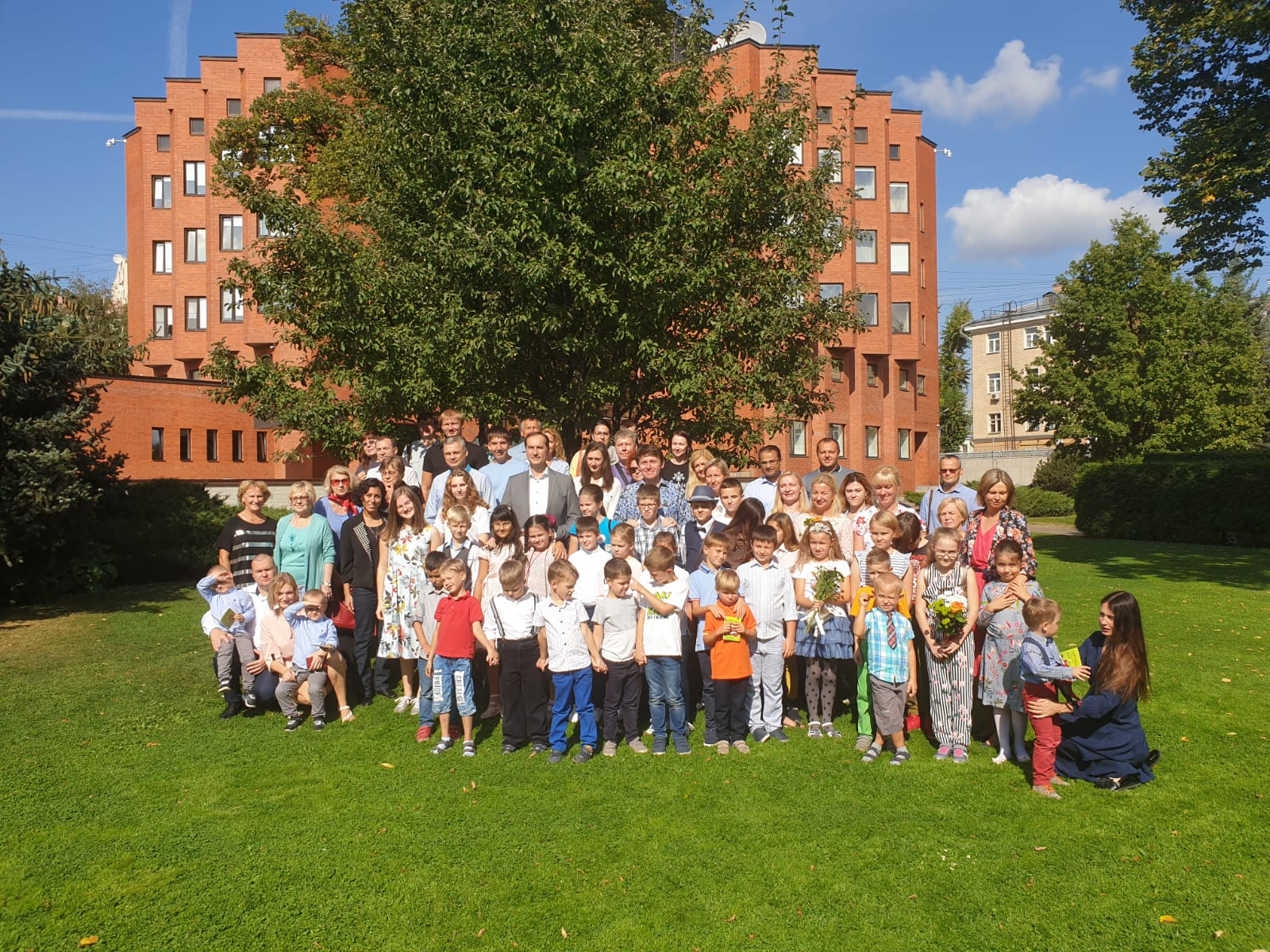
- Students of the school at the Latvian embassy in Moscow, 2019

Total population
- 8,516, including 371 Latgalians (modern) (2021 Census)

Regions with significant populations
- Moscow, Bashkortostan, Siberia

Languages
- Russian, Latvian

Related ethnic groups
- Other Latvians

In Russia, Latvians are a small ethnic minority scattered across its various regions. In the 2021 census, 8,516 individuals in Russia identified as ethnic Latvian, down from 18,979 in 2010, previously from 28,520 in 2002.

== History ==
Latvian language in the Russian Empire (1897)

There have been several waves of migration of Latvians to Russia following the annexation of the Latvian lands by the Russian Empire in the 18th century.

The Latvian Lutheran Christ the Saviour Church in St. Petersburg, 19th century

A Latvian Lutheran church existed in St. Petersburg since 1849.

During the 19th century, many landless Latvian peasants moved eastwards, establishing settlements in Siberia and the Urals. Thousands of Latvians migrated to Russia as refugees during the First World War. A number of Latvian Bolshevik politicians and activists settled down in Russia after the Russian Civil War and became members of the Soviet state leadership.

According to the results of the First All-Union Census of the Soviet Union of 1926, more than 151,000 ethnic Latvians lived in the USSR. Numerous Latvian cultural organizations, publishing houses and schools were created in various regions of the USSR. The largest and most influential organization was Prometejs Society, headquartered in Moscow.

In the 1930s, thousands of Latvians faced repressions by the regime of Joseph Stalin. Starting from November 1936, the NKVD carried out the so-called "Latvian Operation", a mass campaign of repressions targeting specifically persons of Latvian origin. First of all, the targets were activists of Latvian organizations, former Red Latvian Riflemen, immigrants from independent Latvia, and even senior governmental officials and prominent communist revolutionaries like Jānis Rudzutaks, Jukums Vācietis, Jānis Bērziņš, and others. More than 21,300 persons were sentenced during the operation, of which 16,575 were executed. In total, about 70,000 ethnic Latvians in the USSR were killed during the repressions of the 1930s.

After the Soviet re-occupation of Latvia in 1944 and establishment of the Latvian SSR, a few Latvians migrated within the USSR, in particular to Moscow and Leningrad. During Perestroika in the 1980s, new organizations of the Latvian diaspora have been established in major cities. Many Latvians went back from Russia to Latvia following the collapse of the Soviet Union and the restoration of the independence of Latvia.

== Latvian settlements in Russia ==
An autonomous Latvian municipality exists in the Russian republic of Bashkortostan – the Arch-Latvian Selsoviet. Latvian settlers came to the region in the 19th century. The Latvian municipality was established in the 1920s, during the ethnic emancipation of the early Soviet years (known as korenization). The Latvian kolkhoz Jaunā dzīve ('New Life') was established there in 1929. Today, Latvians make up approximately 300 out of almost 2000 inhabitants of the municipality.

In the Siberian krai of Krasnoyarsk, the village Nizhnyaya Bulanka (Russian: Нижняя Буланка; Latvian: Lejas Bulāna) was founded by Latvian settlers in 1859. Today the village has less than 100 inhabitants.

== Organizations ==
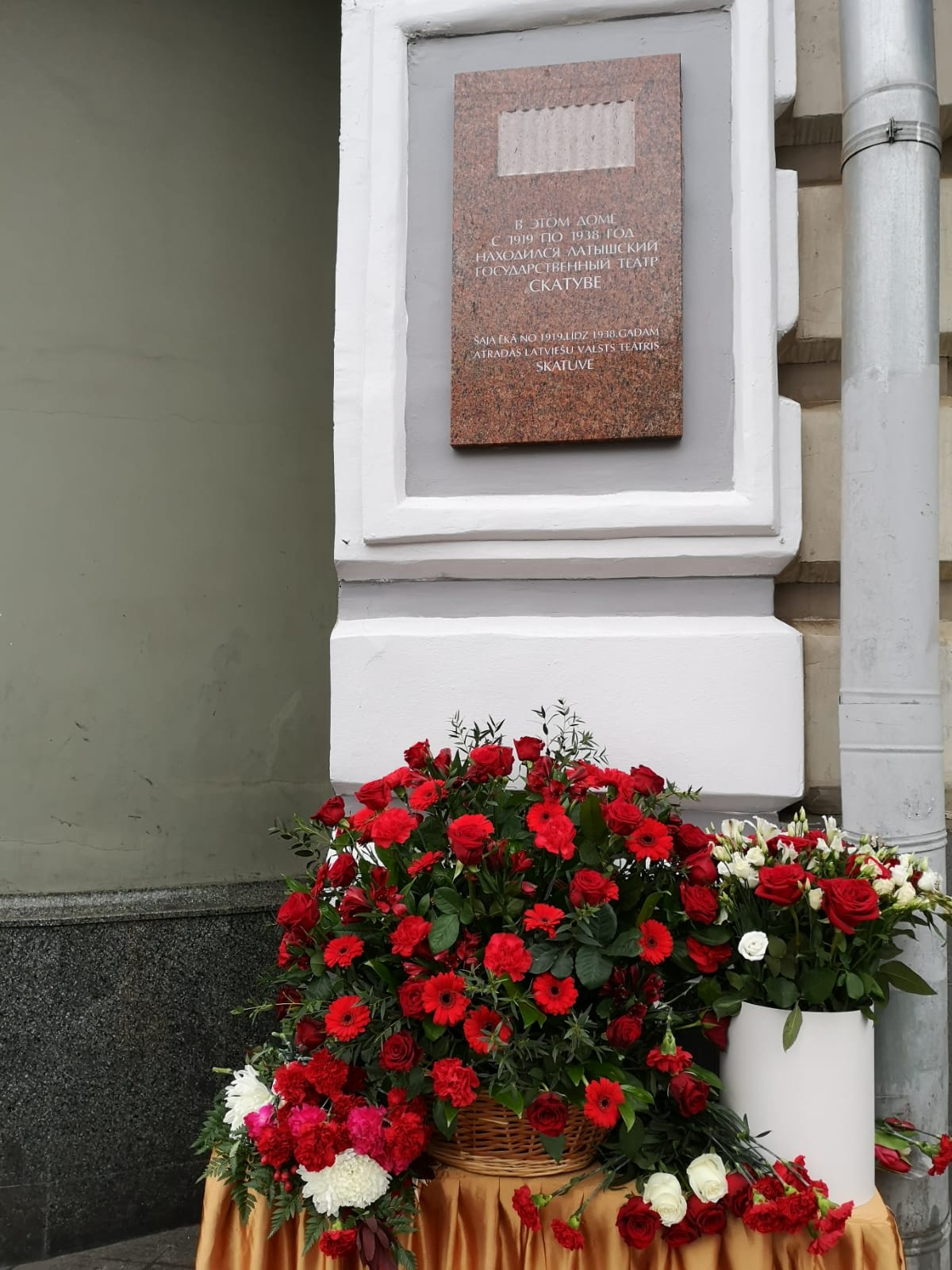
Memorial plaque on the former building of the Soviet state Latvian theatre Skatuve in Moscow. The theatre was shut down by the Stalinist regime in November 1937, its staff was almost entirely executed during the Great Purge

Since the 1990s, there is a number of Latvian organizations and Latvian Lutheran parishes in Russia, primarily in major cities such as Moscow, Saint Petersburg, Omsk, Tomsk, Smolensk and others. The Moscow Latvian choir, Tālava, was established in 1993.

== Burials ==
Several Latvian communists are buried in the Kremlin Wall Necropolis in Moscow: Pēteris Stučka, Arvīds Pelše, Jānis Lepse, Jānis Valdovskis, Oto Vērzemnieks, Jānis Zvejnieks, as well as the Riga-born scientist Mstislav Keldysh.

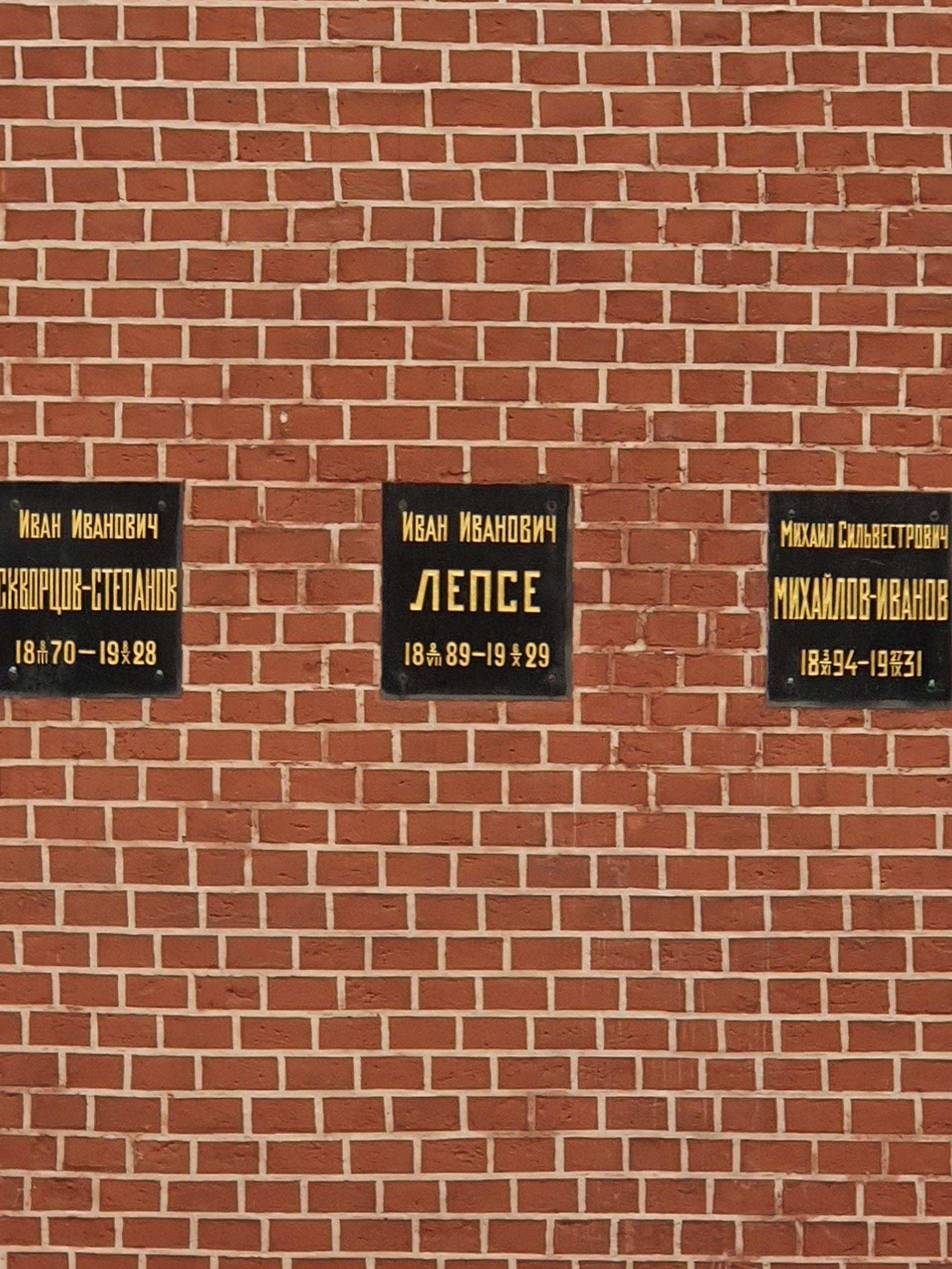
Burial of Jānis Lepse in the Kremlin Wall

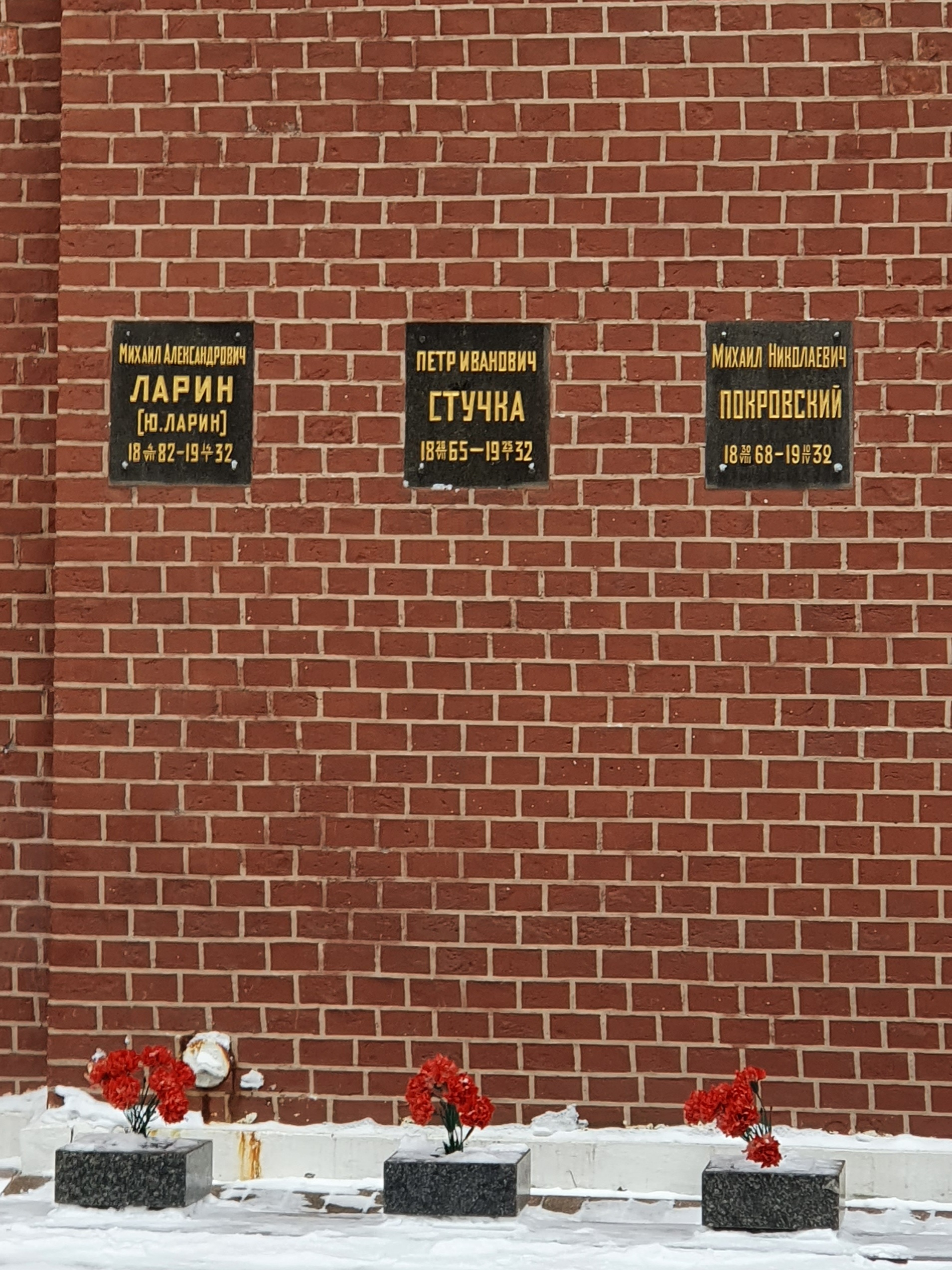
Burial of Pēteris Stučka in the Kremlin Wall

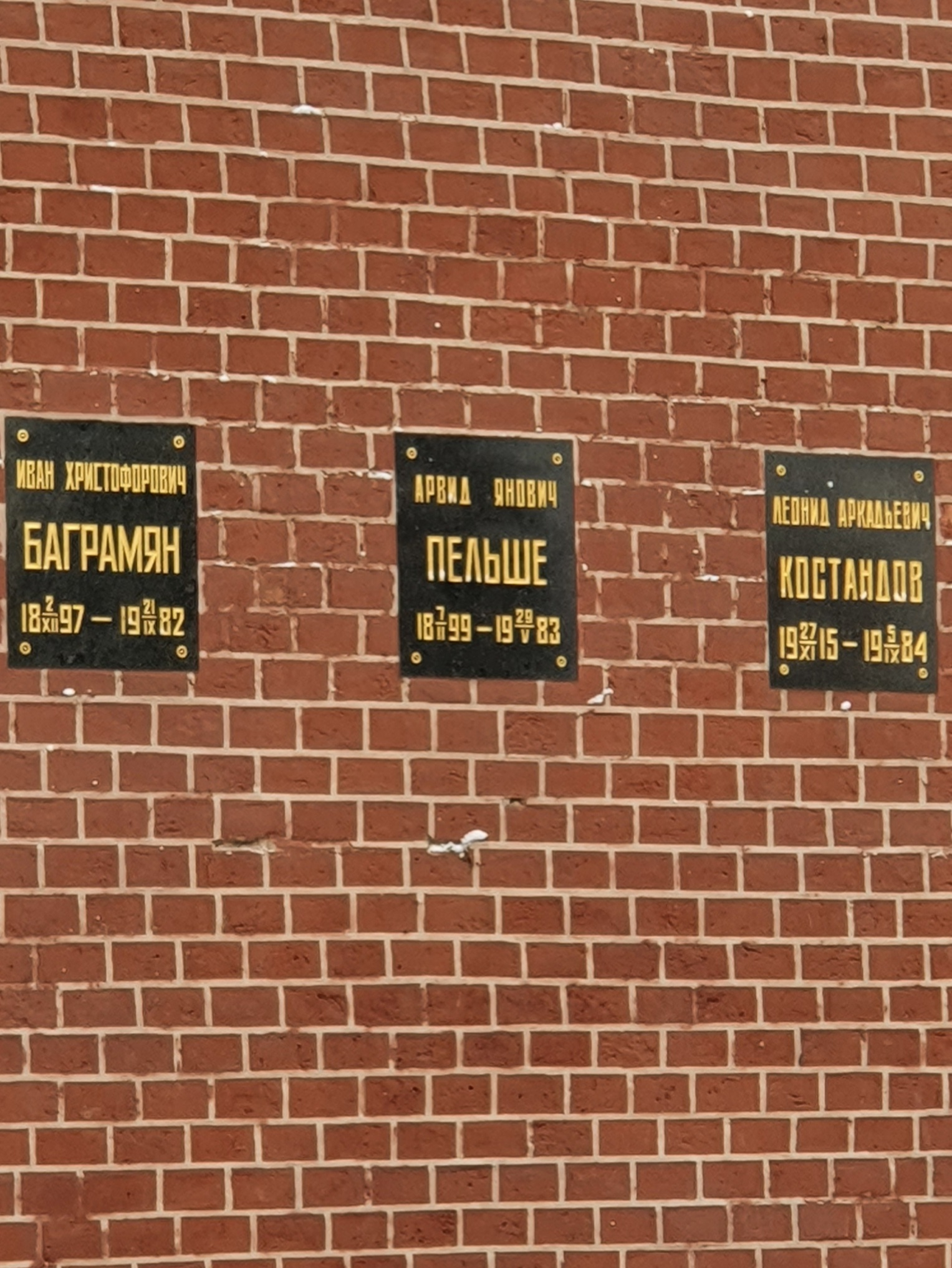
Burial of Arvīds Pelše in the Kremlin Wall

== Russians of Latvian descent ==
- Petr Aven, businessman and former government minister
- Alexei Kudrin, statesman, former finance minister
- Vladimir Vladimirovich Kara-Murza, politician and human rights activist
- Valdis Pelšs, television presenter
- Dmitry Nagiyev, actor, TV-host, musician, showman and radio host
- Alexander Auzan, economist, head of economics department of the Moscow State University

=== Latvians in the Soviet Union ===
- Otto Schmidt, scientist, explorer of the Arctic, Hero of the Soviet Union
- Pēteris Stučka, first president of the Supreme Court of the Soviet Union
- Jukums Vācietis, the first commander-in-chief of the Red Army
- Jānis Fabriciuss, widely memorialized commander in the Red Army during the Russian Civil War and in the 1920s
- Jēkabs Alksnis, commander of the Red Army Air Forces from 1931 to 1937
- Jānis Rudzutaks, Soviet government minister, member of the Politburo of the Communist Party of the Soviet Union
- Valērijs Mežlauks, Chairman of the State Planning Committee (Gosplan) in 1934 – 1937
- Jānis Lencmanis, Arvīds Zeibots and Jānis Bērziņš, creators of the Soviet military intelligence
- Jānis Mežlauks, first General Secretary of the Communist Party of the Turkmen SSR
- Vilhelms Knoriņš, head of the Communist Party of the Belarusian SSR in 1920 – 1923 and in 1927 – 1928
- Jānis Strods, commander of Soviet troops in Yakutia during the Yakut revolt
- Karl Bauman, statesman, member of the Central Committee elected by the 17th Congress of the All-Union Communist Party (Bolsheviks)
- Boris Pugo, Minister of Interior in the USSR, member of the GKChP in the 1991 Soviet coup d'état attempt
- Arvīds Pelše, member of the Politburo of the Communist Party of the Soviet Union
- Jānis Bērziņš, Ambassador of the Soviet Union to Austria between 1925 and 1927
- Jānis Lācis, Red Army commander, member of the Central Executive Committee of the Russian Soviet Federative Socialist Republic
- Otto Lācis, Soviet and Russian journalist

=== Latvian Baltic Germans in Russia and the Soviet Union ===
- Sergei Eisenstein, film director of Baltic German or Baltic Jewish origin
- Michael Andreas Barclay de Tolly, Russian field marshal during the 1812 war with Napoleon
- House of Biron, a Baltic German aristocratic family
  - Ernst Johann von Biron, Regent of Russia in 1737–1740
- House of Lieven, an aristocratic family allegedly descending from Livonian tribal leaders
- Yevgeny Miller, general and one of the leaders of the anticommunist White Army during and after the Russian Civil War
- Wilfried Strik-Strikfeldt, officer of the White Army during the Russian Civil War and of the Russian Liberation Army during World War II
- Roerich family:
  - Nicholas Roerich, painter
  - George de Roerich, Tibetologist and translator
  - Svetoslav Roerich, painter
- Harald Julius von Bosse, architect and painter

== See also ==
- Latvia–Russia relations
- Russians in Latvia
- Latvian Operation of the NKVD
