= Monument to Sergei Rachmaninov =

- Памятник Сергею Рахманинову
- Location: Moscow, Strastnoy Boulevard
- Coordinates: 55°46′03″N 37°36′40″E
- Material: bronze, granite
- Completion date: 1999

The Monument to Sergei Rachmaninov (Russian: Памятник Сергею Рахманинову) was installed in 1999 in Moscow on Strastnoy Boulevard. The authors of the monument are sculptors O. K. Komov, A. N. Kovalchuk and architect Yu. P. Grigoriev. The monument has the status of a declared object of cultural heritage.

== History and description ==
Originally a monument to the Russian composer Sergei Rachmaninov (1873–1943) was planned to be installed on the Tambov embankment. To work on the monument began the sculptor Oleg Komov (1932–1994), but he died, almost finishing his sculpture. For the installation of this monument, the sculptor's relatives asked for too high a fee, because of which they refused to install it in Tambov.

Soon it was decided to install this monument in Moscow on Strastnoy Boulevard near House No. 5, where Rakhmaninov lived from 1905 to 1917. Completed the work of Oleg Komov, his pupil, sculptor Andrei Kovalchuk. Works on the installation of the monument were conducted under the guidance of Yury Rakhmaninov, the director of "Transinzhstroy", a relative of the composer.

The monument was unveiled on 12 November 1999. It was the world's first monumental monument to Rachmaninov. The ceremony was attended by Culture Minister Vladimir Egorov, Moscow Mayor Yuri Luzhkov, Chairman of the Union of Russian Composers Vladislav Kazenin, President of the Rachmaninov Society Professor Viktor Merzhanov, Professor of the Moscow Conservatory Alexei Kandinsky and Yuri Rakhmaninov.

The bronze sculpture of Rachmaninov is mounted on a cubic granite pedestal. The composer is depicted dressed in a concert suit and sitting, leaning on the back of a chair. There is a slight tension in his figure. A soft smile on his face. A thoughtful look is turned to the distance, towards the house in which he lived for many years.
