= Prometejs =

Organisation of the Latvian diaspora in the USSR in the 1920s and 1930s

- Prometejs
- Formation: September 25, 1924; 102 years ago
- Dissolved: July 16, 1937; 89 years ago
- Official language: Latvian, Russian
- Chairman as at 1937: Jūlijs Daniševskis
- Deputy Chairman as at 1937: Fricis Bernovskis

Prometejs (Russian: Прометей, English translation: Prometheus) was the largest organisation ("educational society", Latvian: izglītības biedrība) of the Latvian diaspora in the interwar Soviet Union. Its members were former Red Latvian riflemen and other Latvian communists and their family members who settled in the USSR after the October Revolution and the Russian Civil War. The organisation was disbanded in the early period of the Great Purge and many of its activists were murdered during the Latvian Operation of the NKVD.

== History ==
The organisation was established in 1923-24 as a successor to Prometejs Printing House (Izdevniecība "Prometejs") that had been founded in 1922 – right after the Latvian Department of the People's Commissariat for Nationalities of the USSR had been dissolved.

Education and communist indoctrination were among the priorities of Prometejs. The organisation maintained a publishing house and printed periodicals and literature predominantly in the Latvian language for urban Latvians as well as for ethnic Latvian settlers living in rural areas. Prometejs was among the largest and most important educational organisations of ethnic minorities in the USSR.

The structure of Prometejs included the following sections:

- Schooling and methodology
- Agriculture
- Music
- Arts
- Latgalian culture
- others

Prometejs published several magazines (including Celtne 'Construction' and Cīņas biedrs 'Brother In Arms') and newspapers (including Komunāru Cīņa 'Struggle of the Communards' and Darba Bērni 'Working Children'). The organisation owned several factories producing stationery in Moscow in Leningrad, a printing house. In Moscow, Prometejs maintained a Latvian kindergarten, owned estates near Moscow, in Skhodnya and Ilyinskoye,

The organisation maintained Latvian theatres in Moscow, Leningrad and Smolensk. The Moscow-baset theatre Skatuve ('Stage'), established in 1919, was recognised as the best ethnic theatre in the USSR in 1933.

Prometejs was banned and its members purged by the Soviet authorities in July 1937 despite attempts to protect the organisation by high-ranking Latvian Soviet officials like Jūlijs Daniševskis (chairman of Prometejs) and Roberts Eidemanis who were eventually themselves arrested and executed.

Talks between the Moscow Latvian Cultural Society and the Moscow City Duma began in 2002 to unveil a plaque, commemorating the members of Skatuve and Prometejs that were repressed by the Soviet regime. After initially being rejected by Moscow authorities, with the support of the Embassy of Latvia in Russia the plaque, created by Jānis Strupulis, was unveiled at Strastnoy Boulevard 8 on March 6, 2020 by Latvian ambassador Māris Riekstiņš and Moscow city officials.

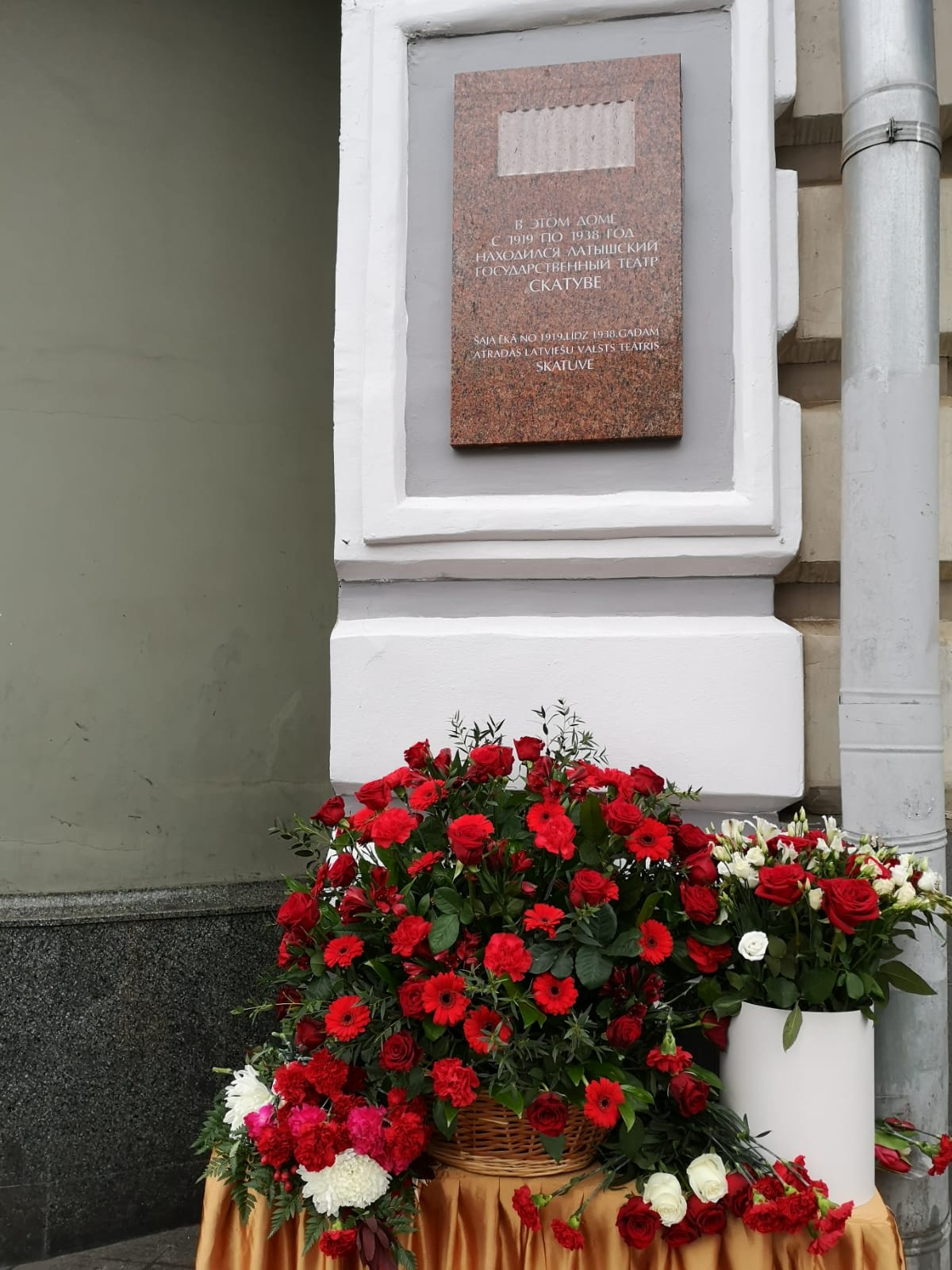
Plaque commemorating the Skatuve Moscow Latvian Theater in Moscow, unveiled 2020

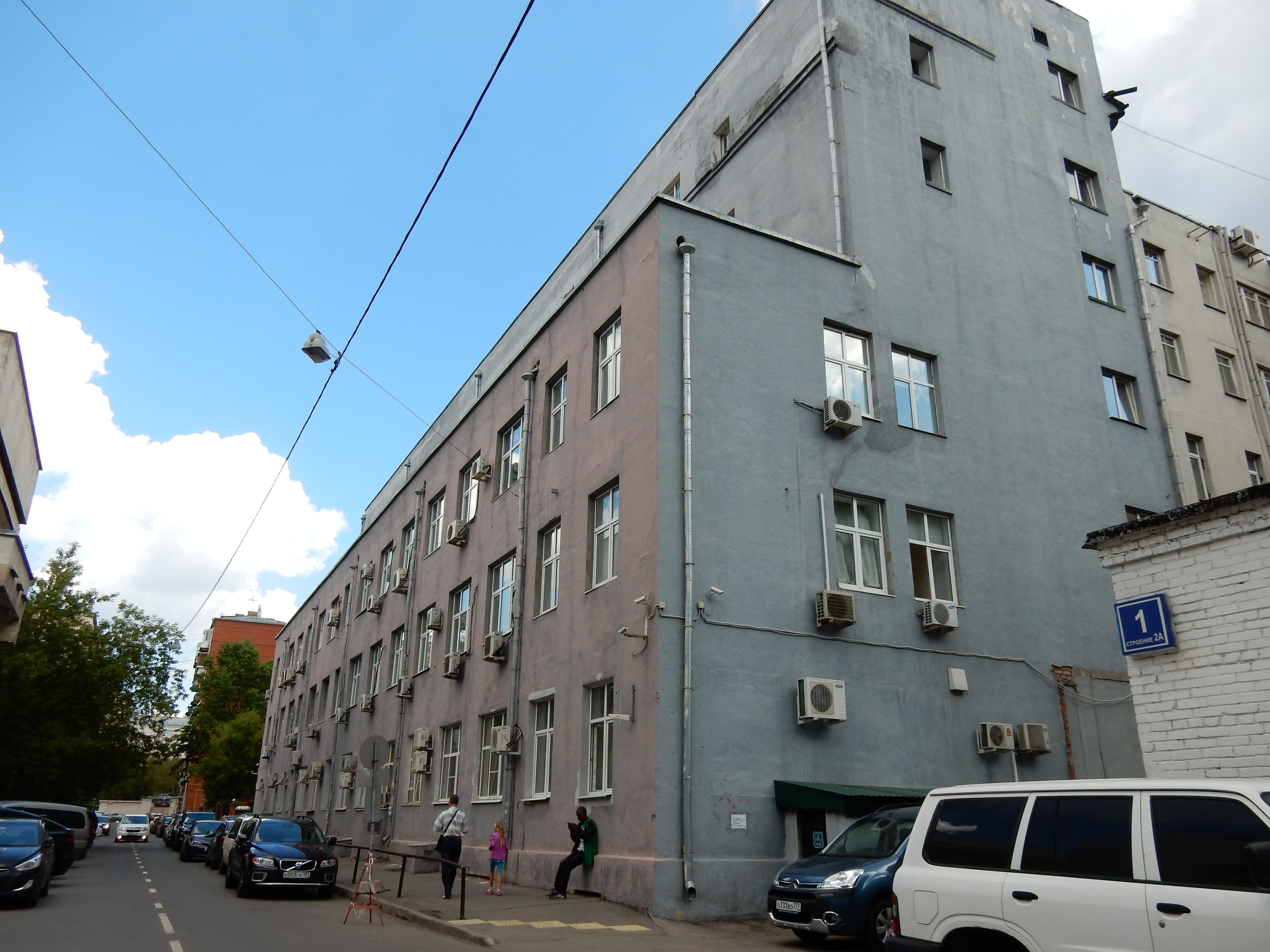
Former headquarters of Prometejs in Moscow, Smolensky Boulevard 3-5

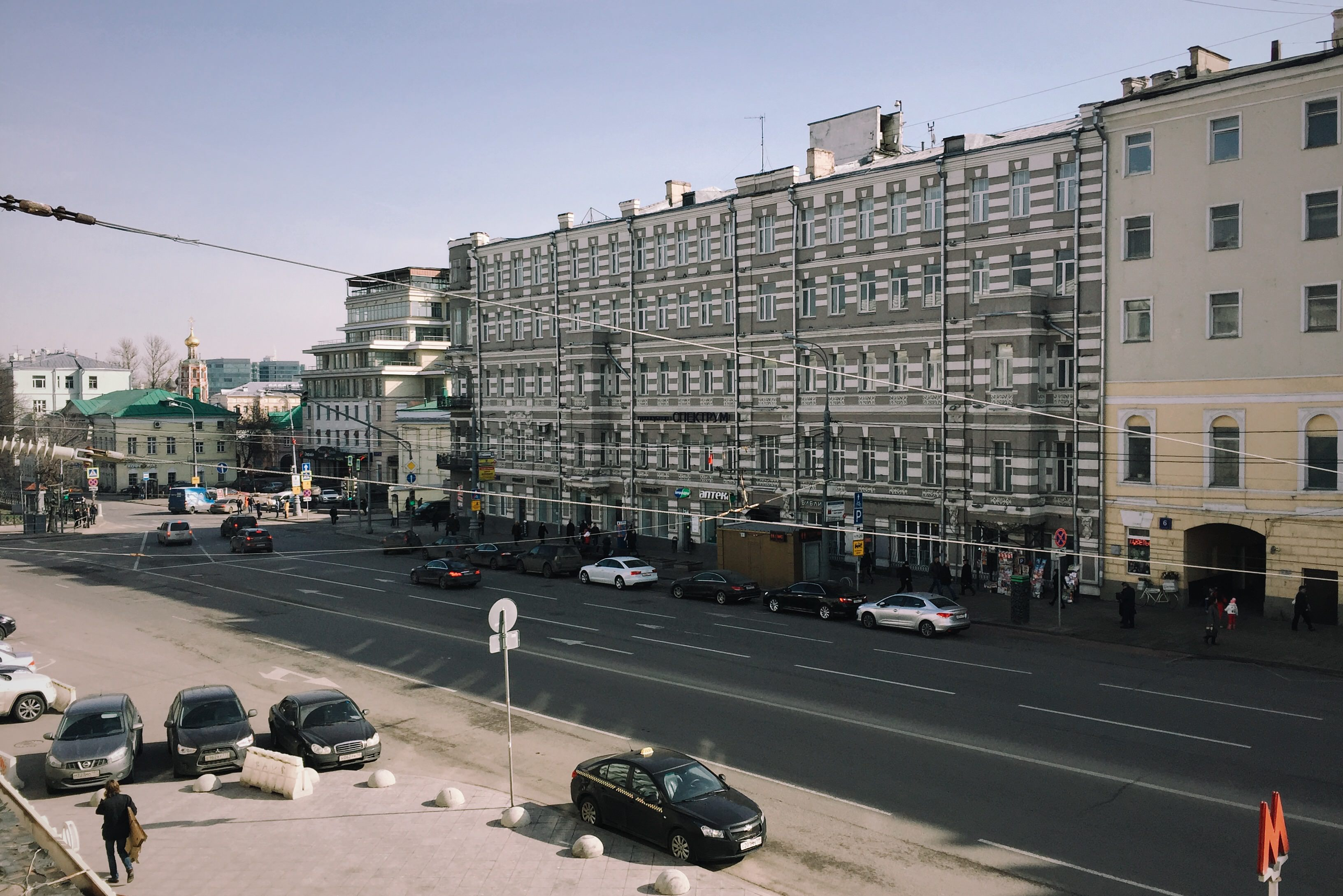
Former building of the Latvian publishing house and other Latvian organisations in Moscow, Strastnoy Boulevard

== Notable members ==
- Jānis Rudzutaks, revolutionary and member of the government of the USSR (honorary member)
- Jēkabs Peterss, revolutionary and one of the founders of the Cheka (honorary member)
- Jukums Vācietis, Red Army commander (honorary member)
- Gustavs Klucis, Soviet Latvian artist

== See also ==
- Latvians in Russia
