= 2018 Russian pension protests =

Protests in Russia between July and November 2018

- Part of 2017–2018 Russian protests
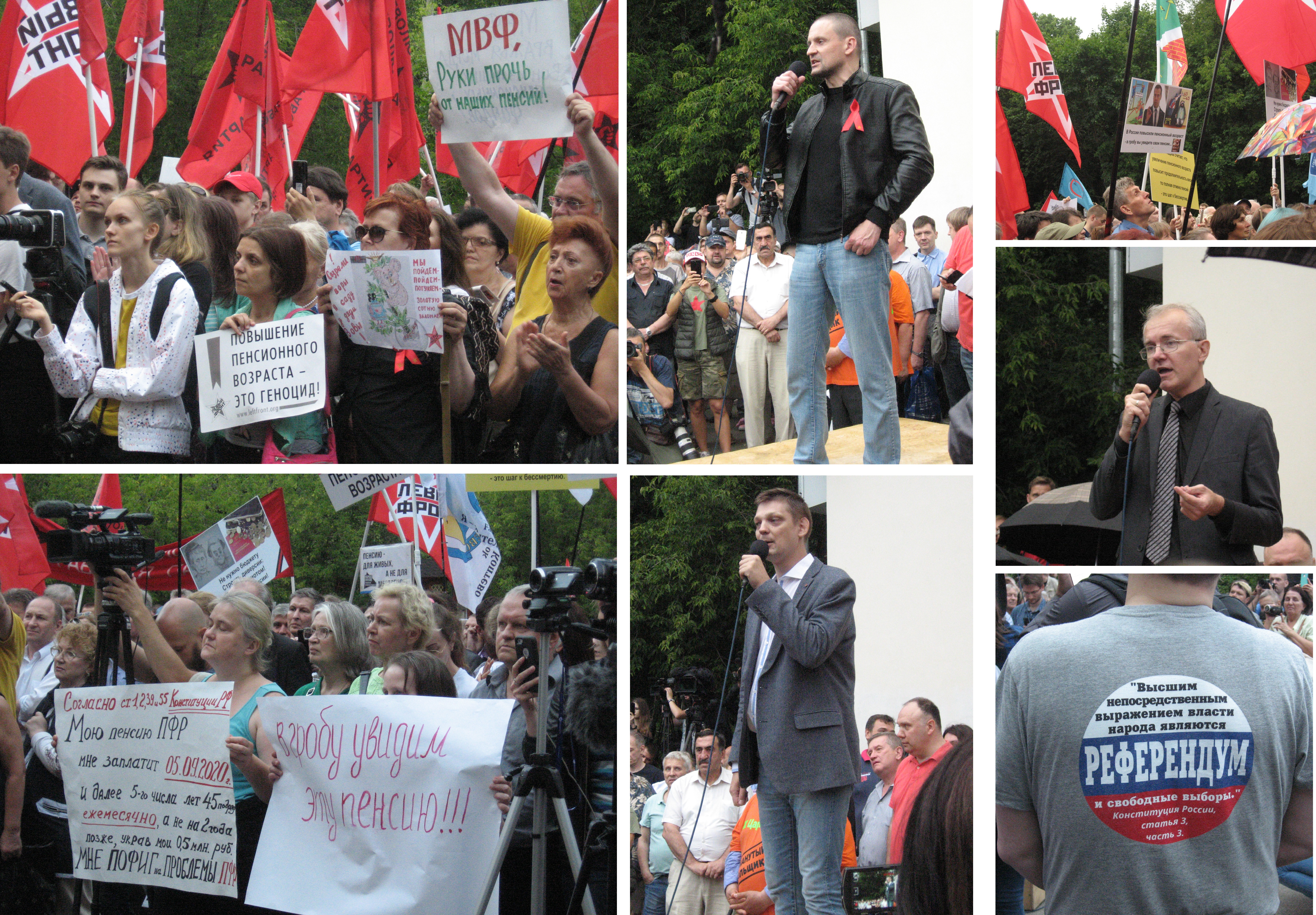
- Action against the planned pension reform in Hyde-Park Moscow on 18 July
- Date: 1 July – 7 November 2018 (4 months and 6 days): 1 July 2018; 18 July 2018; 28–29 July 2018; 2 September 2018; 9 September 2018; 22 September 2018; 5–7 November 2018
- Location: Cities all over Russia
- Caused by: Raising the retirement age
- Goals: Cancellation of raising the retirement age; Resignation of Vladimir Putin and Dmitry Medvedev's Second Cabinet
- Methods: Demonstrations and Internet activism
- Status: Retirement age raising reduced from 63 to 60 for women; Some actions against the reform were continued with a lower intensity; Dmitry Medvedev's Second Cabinet resigned in January 2020 due to low approval rating

Parties
(Russia) Russian opposition: Communist Party; Left Front; A Just Russia; Russia of the Future; People's Freedom Party; Solidarnost; Anti-Corruption Foundation; Termless protest	Russian government; National Guard; National Guard Forces Command; OMON; SOBR; Ministry of Interior Affairs; Police; United Russia

Lead figures
Gennady Zyuganov; Sergey Udaltsov; Alexei Navalny; Oleg Shein; Yevgeny Roizman; Leonid Volkov; Ilya Yashin; Sergey Boyko; Mikhail Svetov; Mikhail Kasyanov; Vladimir Ryzhkov; Vyacheslav Maltsev; Dmitry Gudkov; Andrei Bazhutin	Vladimir Putin (Russia) Dmitry Medvedev (Russia) Sergey Neverov

Number
	Unknown

Casualties
- Injuries: 2

The 2018 Russian pension protests were a series of country-wide protests and demonstrations in Russia demanding abandoning of the retirement age hike.

A plan of the pension reform was unexpectedly announced by Dmitry Medvedev's Second Cabinet on June 14, 2018, which was the opening day of the 2018 FIFA World Cup hosted in Russia. During the tournament, any demonstrations were prohibited but from July 2018 thousands of Russians expressed their negative opinion on the planned reform of the pension system. The anti-reform rallies and other actions were mostly organized by the Communist Party of the Russian Federation and A Just Russia party; however, other political parties, trade unions and individuals also contributed to coordination of these protests. The corresponding bill was signed into law on October 3, and afterwards some actions against the reform were continued, although with a lower intensity.

An intention to hike the national retirement age and the more so a final decision to launch the reform have drastically downed the rating of the president Vladimir Putin and prime minister Dmitry Medvedev in Russia. In July 2018, just 49% would vote for Putin if the presidential elections were held in that moment; during the elections in March, he got 76.7%.

== Background ==
On June 14, 2018, the Russian government announced the plan of the pension reform presuming a substantial increase of the retirement age (for men from 60 to 65 and for women from 55 to 63). Previously, until the 2018 Russian presidential election, this topic was practically silenced in Russian state media, in particular several days before the election the RIA Novosti agency published an article denying existence of any intentions to raise the pension age until 2030. In the previous years the problem was sporadically discussed but with no special accent. So an announcement of the reform plan by Prime Minister Medvedev has shocked the majority of Russian citizens.

The pension reform became the central question in Russia at that time. Immediate protests during the World Cup were, however, not allowed (except Internet-activism) from security reasons. The street protest actions were appointed for the end-July and subsequent months. The government was accused of misusing soccer for hiding the unpopular measures. Near 90% of Russian citizens do not approve of the reform.

On July 19, during the first reading of the corresponding bill in the State Duma, the pro-Putin political party United Russia (with a single exception of Natalia Poklonskaya) has supported the retirement age hike, while all the opposition fractions, left-wing and liberal, were against it.

== Key protest events ==
Statistical studies show that the number of protest actions in the country has nearly tripled in the third quarter from the year before, almost exclusively because of the plan to raise the retirement age.

=== July–August 2018 ===
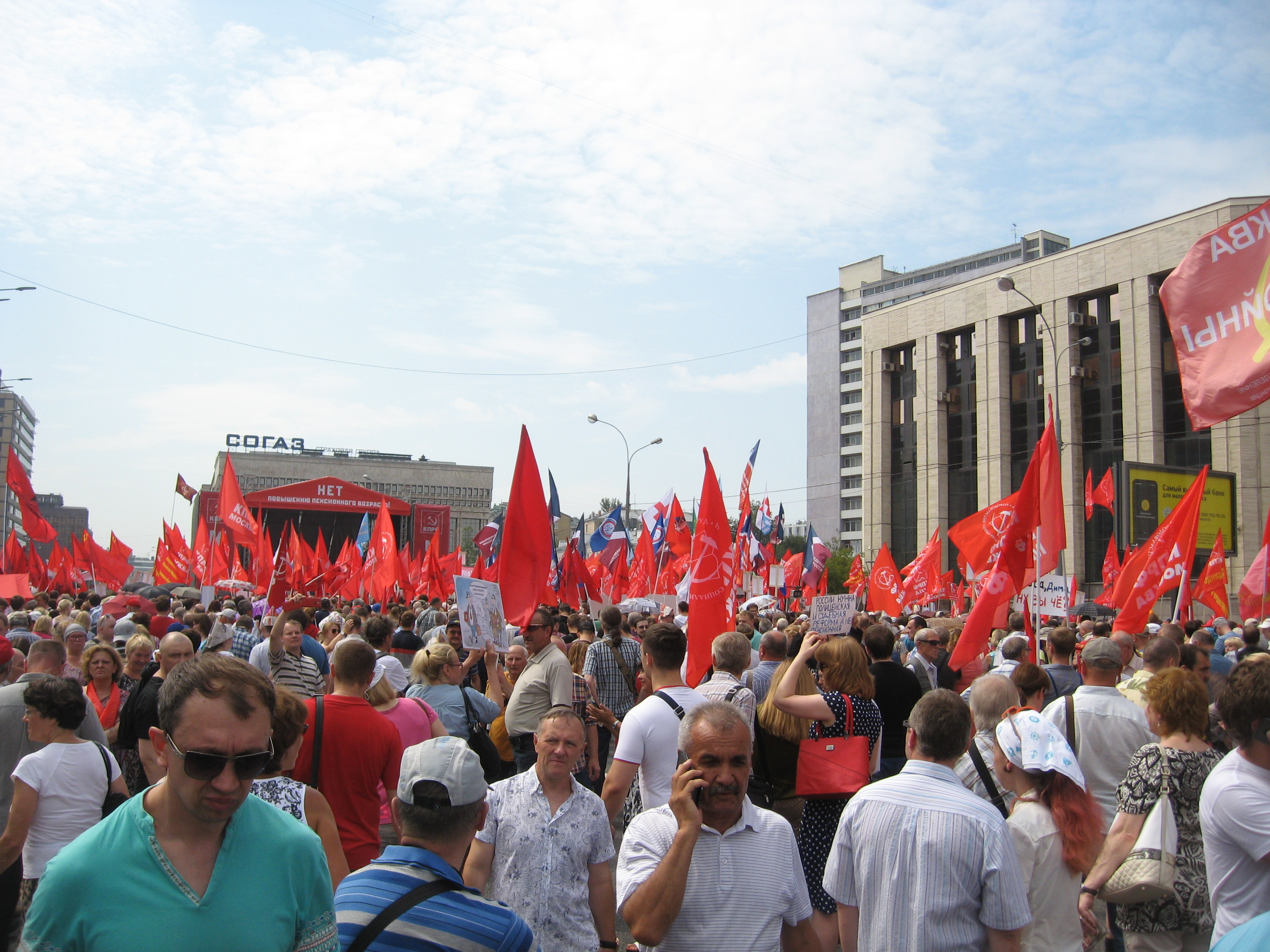
Anti-reform action on 28 July in Moscow

The first noteworthy street rallies, related with the retirement-age reform, proceeded on July 1. Several thousand people protested across Russia against an extremely unpopular government decision to hike the pension age that has led to a record slump in President Vladimir Putin's approval ratings. No protests were held in World Cup host cities due to a regulation banning protest in the cities for the duration of the tournament.

From mid-July, protest rallies and demonstrations were organized practically every weekend, and sometimes also on working days. They occurred in nearly all major cities countrywide including Novosibirsk, Saint-Petersburg and Moscow. Total number of participants exceeded 200 thousands. These events were coordinated by all opposition parties, who usually have nothing common in political affairs. Also trade unions and individual politicians (Alexey Navalny, Sergei Udaltsov) functioned as organizers of the public actions. The largest protest events of the summer occurred on July 18 and July 28–29. In particular, on July 28, more than 10,000 people attended a rally in the capital, Moscow.

=== September 2018 ===
On September 2, large-scale anti-reform manifestations were led by the Russian communists and some other left-wing oppositional political forces. In Moscow, about 9,000 people attended a rally against the governmental pension reform.

A week later, on September 9, the demonstrations against the plans to raise the national retirement age were organized by Alexey Navalny all over Russia. The events occurred in more than 80 cities including the capital. The most of actions were not permitted by the authorities, and the police detained in total about 1000 participants. Beyond the anti-reform slogans, the participants chanted "Russia without Putin" and held signs with messages like "Putin, when will you go on pension?".

Further rallies were announced for every Saturday or Sunday of September 2018. So, on September 22, the countrywide protest actions were organized by the Communist party. In Moscow, several thousands demanded abandoning the pension reform and blamed the Russian government for this unpopular initiative.

The reform has heavily affected the Russia's local elections in September 2018: the results of the governing United Russia party was the worst for more than 10 years.

United Russia lost the Khabarovsk Krai gubernatorial election and Vladimir Oblast gubernatorial election to the Liberal Democratic Party of Russia, and lost Khakassia election to the Communist Party of the Russian Federation.

== Reaction of authorities ==
The reform was passed by the State Duma on first reading on July 19, with a 328-104 vote.

Following strong protests (and a strong fall in Putin's and United Russia's popularity), the president of Russia Vladimir Putin has submitted to the Duma some amendments to reduce the hike of the retirement age for women from 63 to 60 years (i.e. +5 instead of +8). Also some other softenings were foreseen, e.g. for women having 3 and more children. The amendments were unanimously passed by the State Duma on September 26.

Nevertheless, the opposition forces and the overwhelming majority of ordinary Russians estimated the presidential changes as by far insufficient and were disappointed at his decision. So in addition to the requirement of abandoning the reform in general and of the resignation of the Government, also the requirement of resignation of Vladimir Putin was raised.

Despite the protests, on September 27, the amended version of the bill was passed by the State Duma on second reading with a 326-59 vote and 1 abstention . On October 3, the bill was also passed by the Federation Council with a 149-5 vote, with 3 abstentions. Finally, Putin signed the pension bill into law later on the same day. It entered into force after it was published on the Rossiyskaya Gazeta some days later.

== After signing the bill into law ==
The oppositional political parties intended to continue fighting against the reform in order to convince the authorities to stop it. However the activity has gradually diminished and, except on November 5–7 (which commemorated the 101st anniversary of the October Revolution), no large anti-reform rallies were organized. Many people came to conclusion that neither the Government nor the president would react to street protests, if any.

The pension reform was launched on January 1, 2019.

A countrywide anti-reform movement was resumed from early spring 2019. Numerous picketing actions and conferences aiming at attracting attention to the potential dangers of the new pension law were organized by the left-patriotic Sut Vremeni group (leader: S. Kurginyan). Furthermore, on March 23, the CPRF called the meetings against the social politics of the Russian government (including the retirement age hike) in the largest cities of Russia, e.g. in Moscow there were several thousand attendees. Nevertheless, an intensity of the street protests has not returned to the level of 2018 — and from 2020 under the COVID-19 pandemic the large-scale actions became impossible.

== See also ==
- 2011–13 Russian protests
- 2014 anti-war protests in Russia
- 2017 Belarusian protests
- 2017–2018 Russian protests
- 2019 Moscow protests
- 2022 anti-war protests in Russia
