= Olga Misik =

Russian political activist

- Ольга Мисик
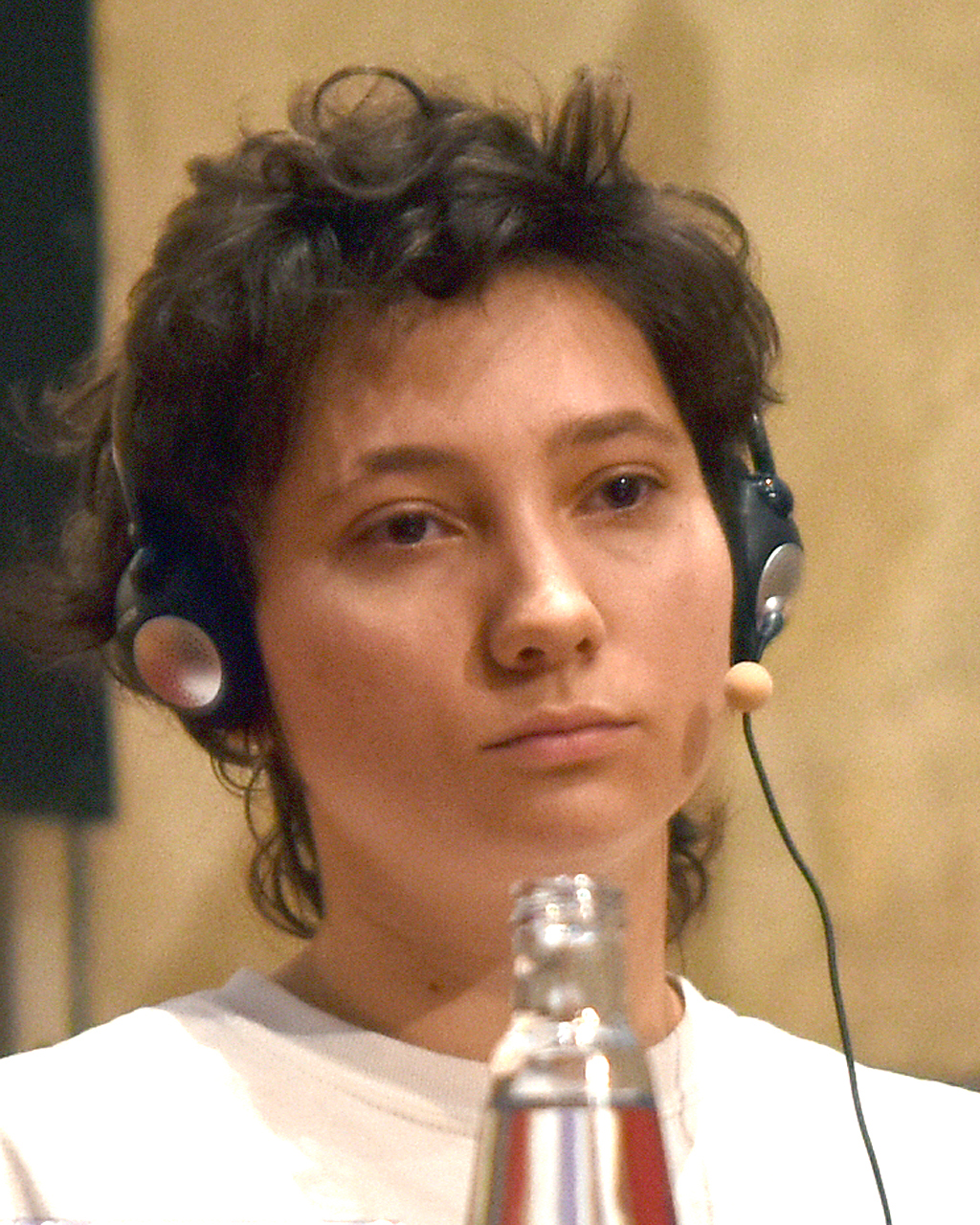
- Misik in 2024
- Born: January 17, 2002 (age 24); Voskresensk, Moscow Oblast, Russia

Olga Misik (Russian: Ольга Мисик; born January 17, 2002) is a Russian political activist. Misik garnered international attention for reading the constitution of Russia to riot police in the 2019 Moscow protests.

== Early life ==
Olga Misik was born on January 17, 2002, in Voskresensk, Moscow Oblast, Russia.

== Activism ==
Misik became politically active in 2018, when she learned about a proposal to raise the retirement ages in Russia.

After the 2019 Moscow City Duma election in which several independent candidates were arrested, large pro-democracy protests formed to demand fair and transparent elections in the city. At age seventeen, Misik joined the protest, at which she read aloud several sections of the Constitution of Russia at a demonstration in front of the riot police. Photos of her reading went viral, with international outlets dubbing her "the girl with the constitution" or comparing her to Tank Man. Linda Colley cites Misik's protest as an example of how constitutions can legitimate pro-democracy protests.

In 2021 Misik was found guilty of vandalism and sentenced to two years, two months of home confinement. During the trial, Misik compared her trial to Sophie Scholl and modern Russia to Nazi Germany.

In November 2022, Misik was added to the federal wanted list by Russian authorities. In April 2023, after the murder of pro-war blogger Vladlen Tatarsky, she tweeted "Oh no, what a nightmare, they killed another scumbag and criminal". Russian law enforcement labelled this "justifying terrorism" and searched Misik's registered apartment in October 2023.
