= Strastnoy Boulevard =

Boulevard in Moscow, Russia

Coordinates: 55°46′03″N 37°36′41″E

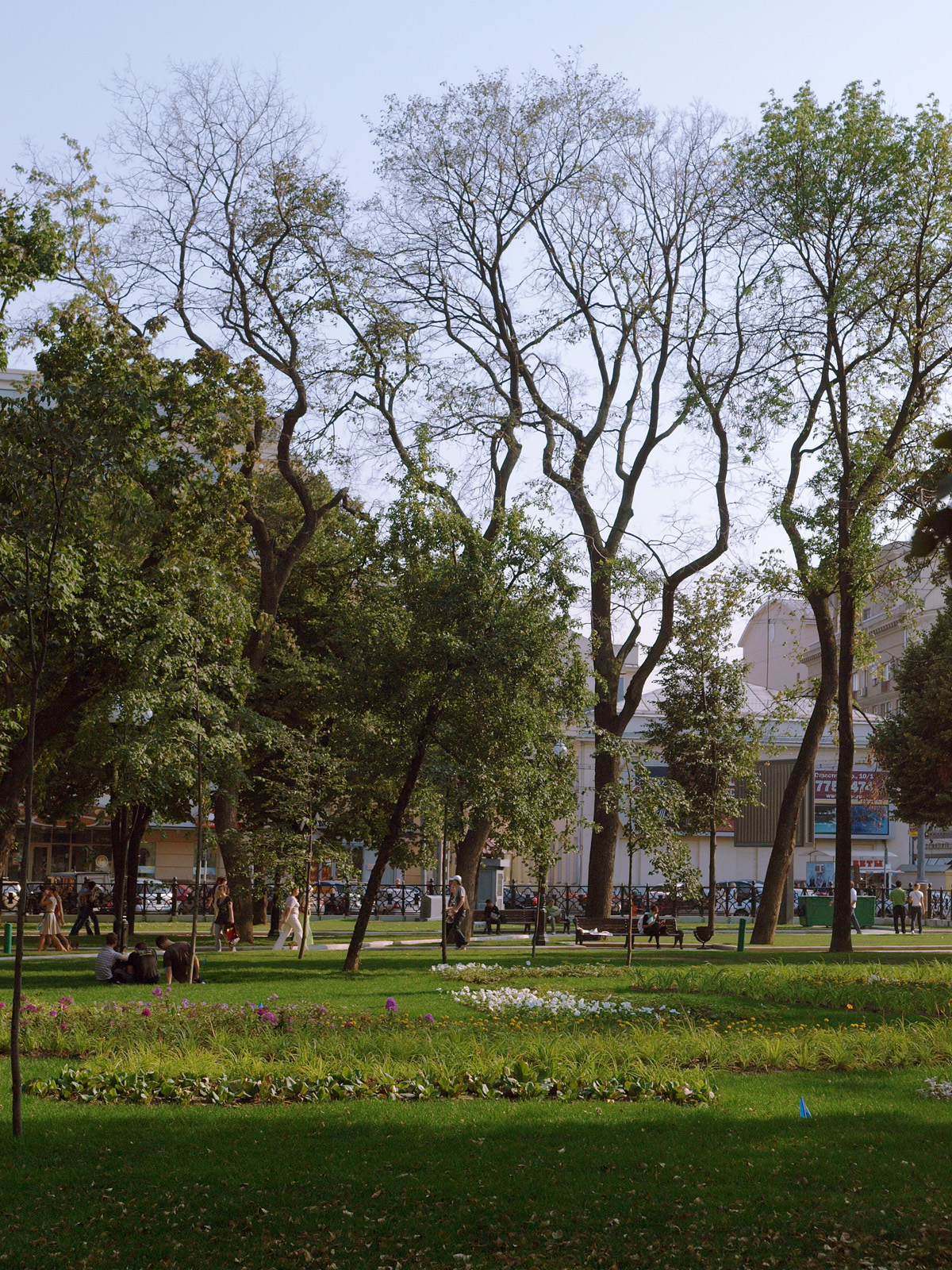

Strastnoy Boulevard (Russian: Страстной Бульвар) is a major boulevard in Moscow. It begins in the Tverskoy District by Pushkin Square, Tverskaya Street and Tverskoy Boulevard. The boulevard ends at Petrovka Street, although east of Petrovka, it becomes Petrovsky Boulevard, where it heads to Clean Ponds. The Strastnoy Boulevard is a part of the Boulevard Ring.

House of S. I. Elagin is located on the boulevard.

== History ==
In 2018, there was an exhibition dedicated to Ivan Turgenev held on the boulevard.

== Gallery ==
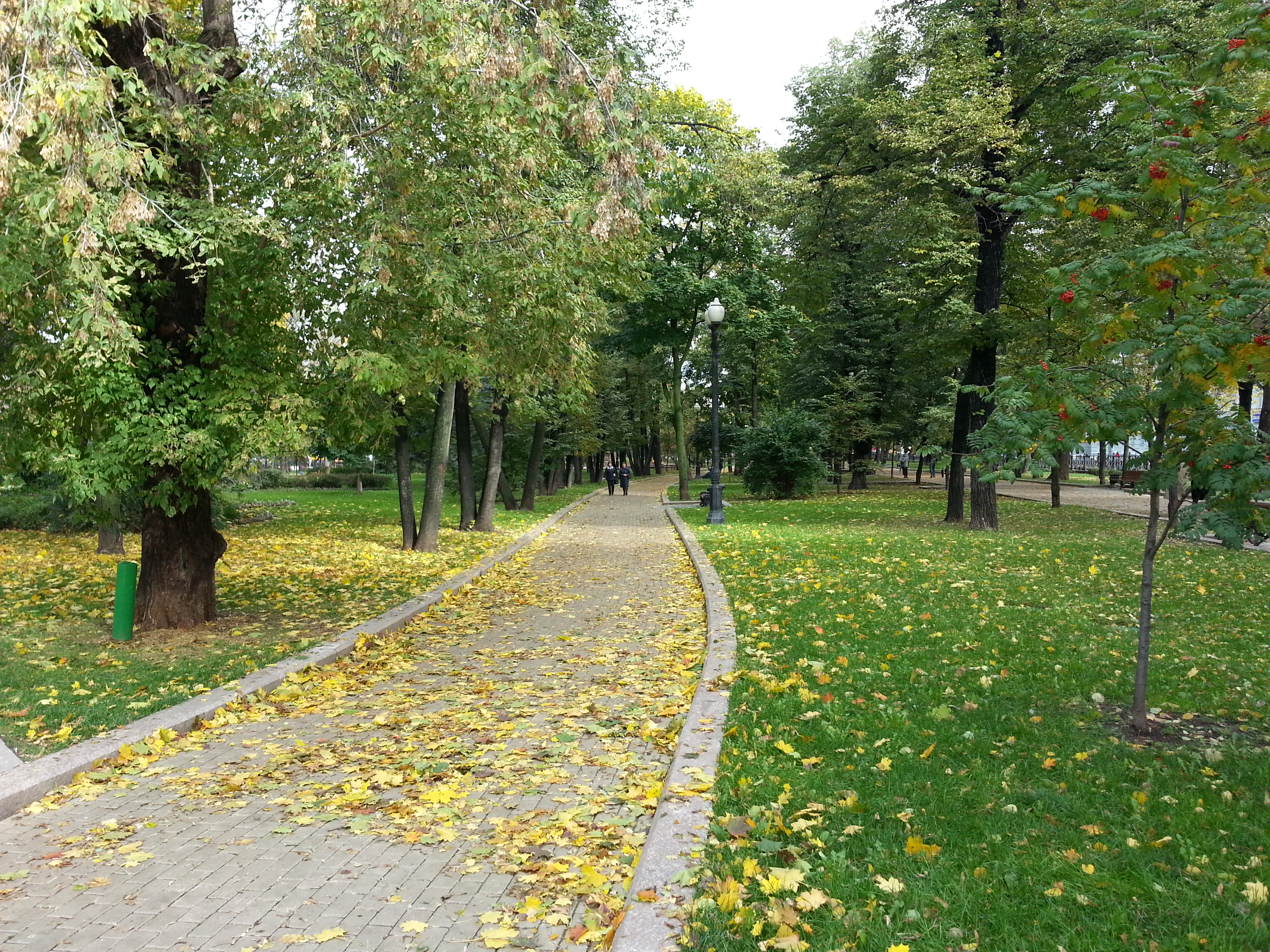

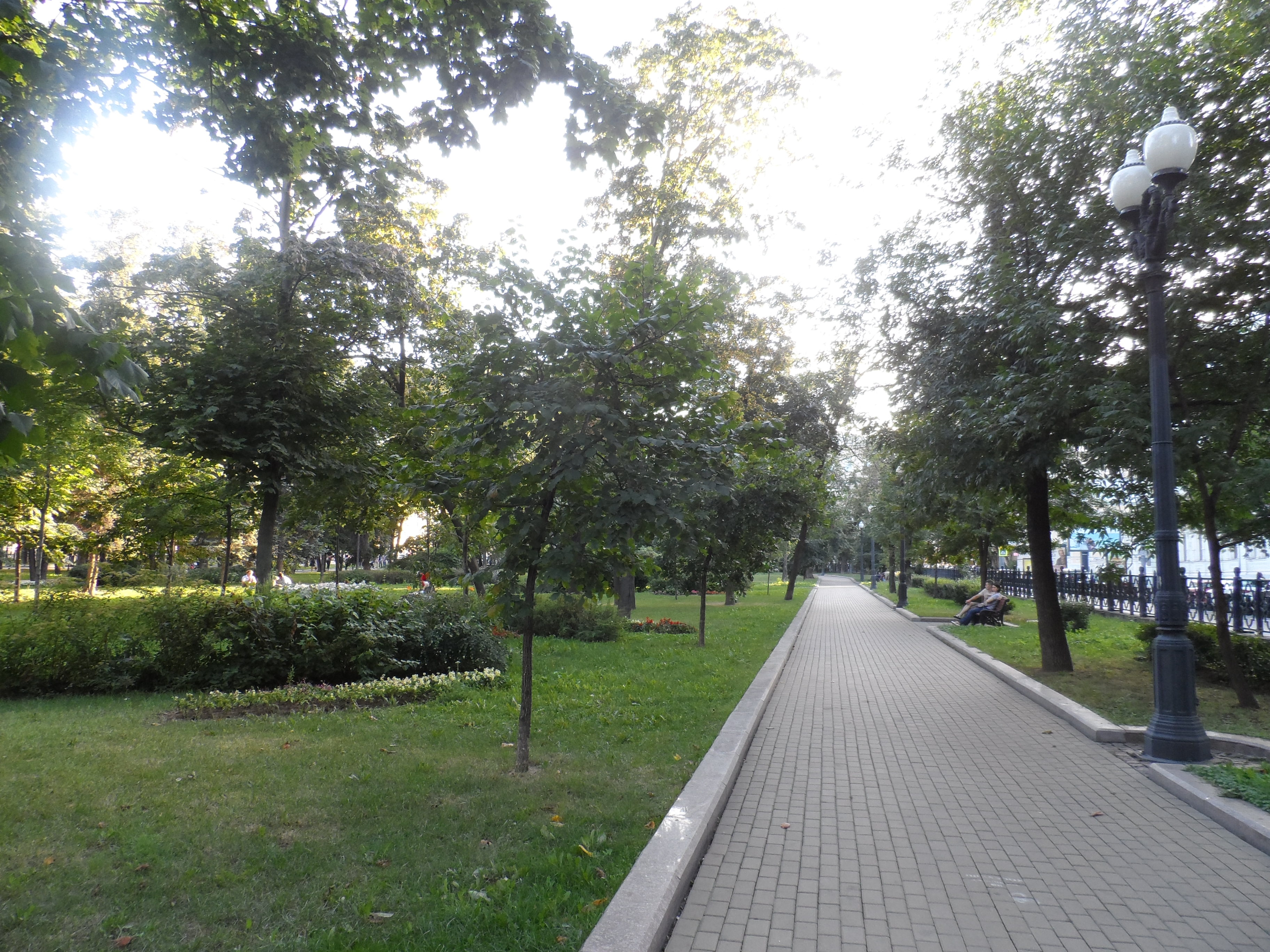

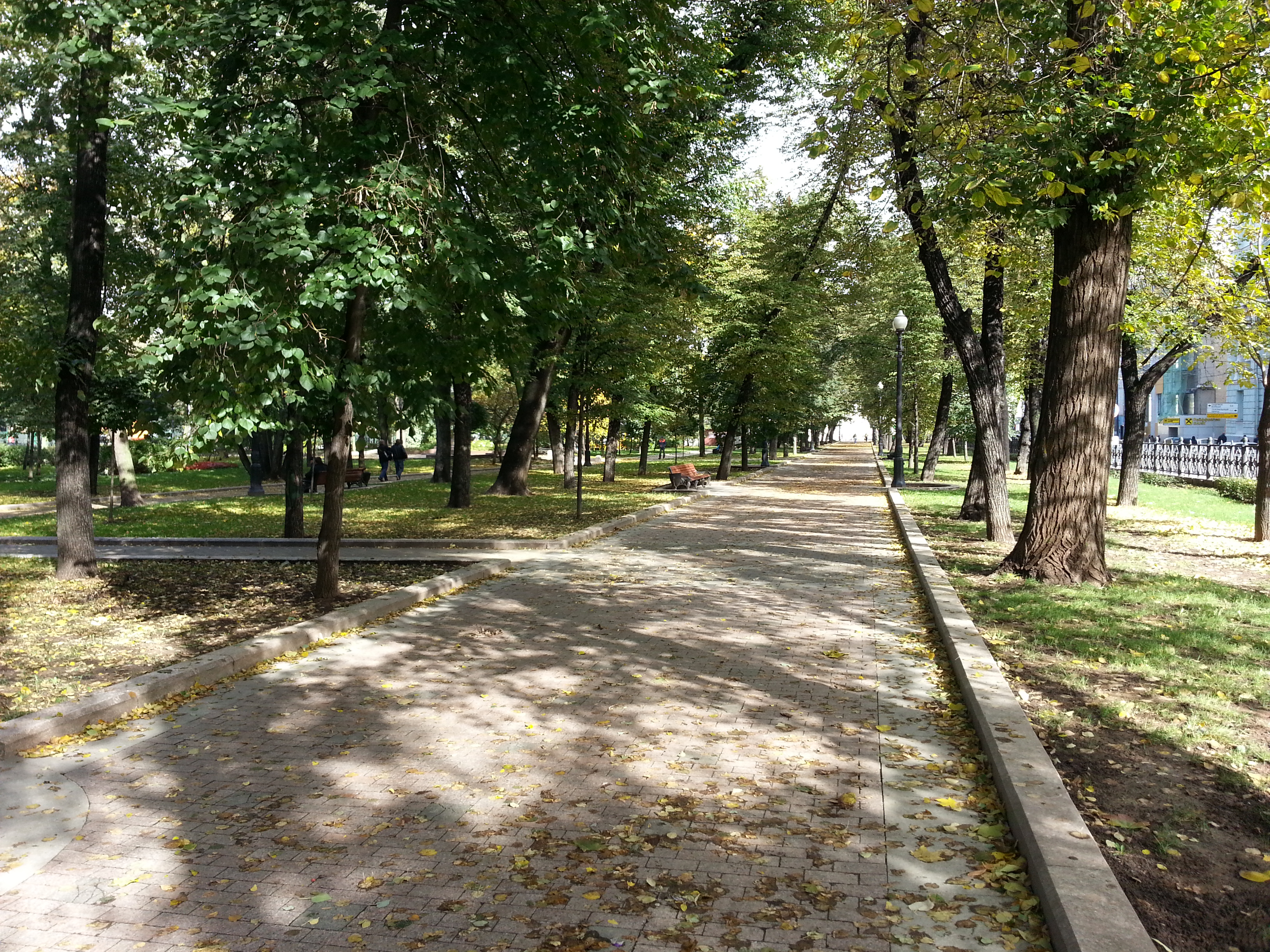

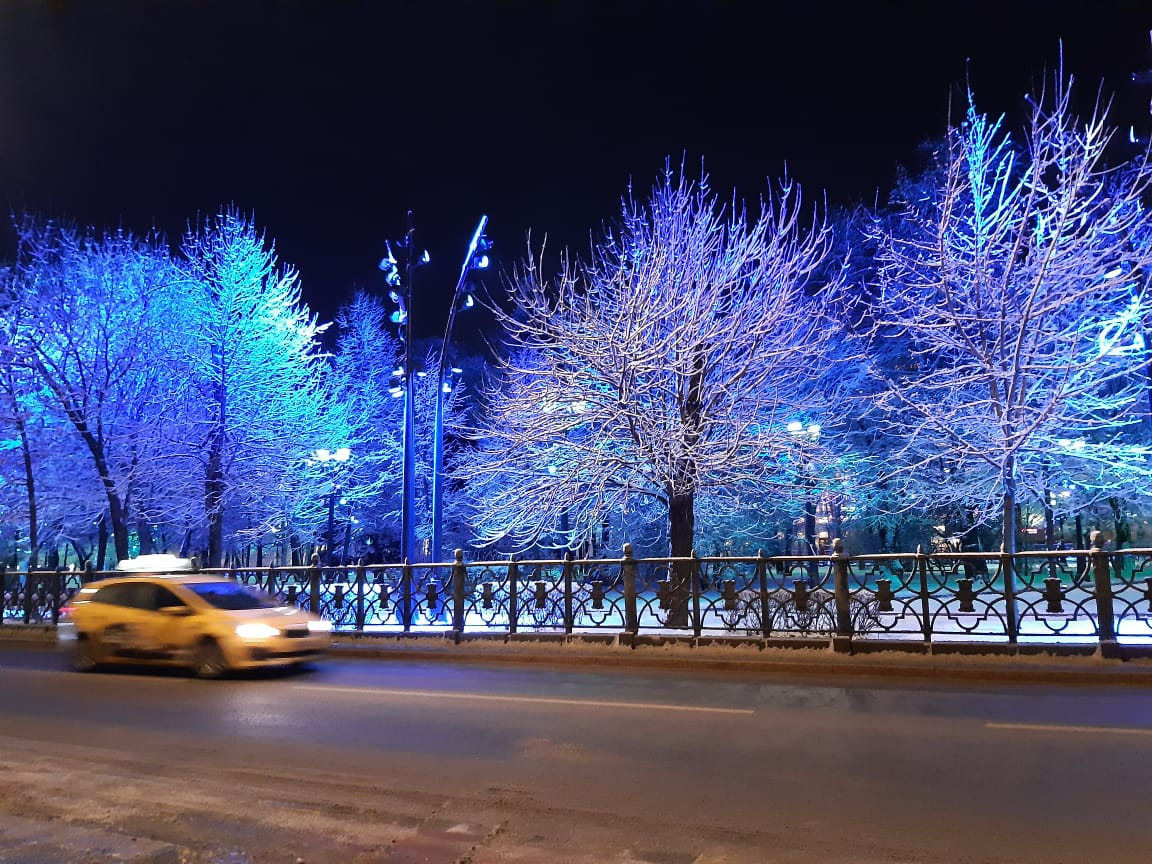

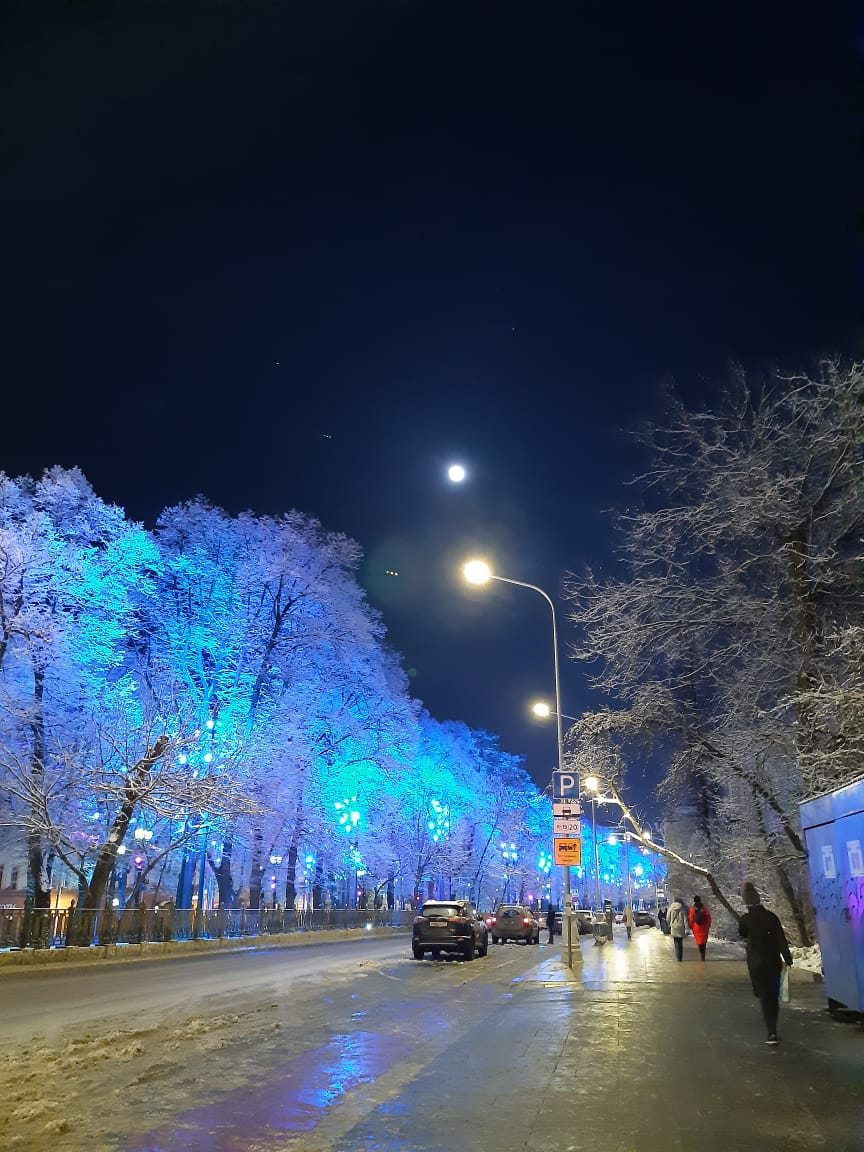

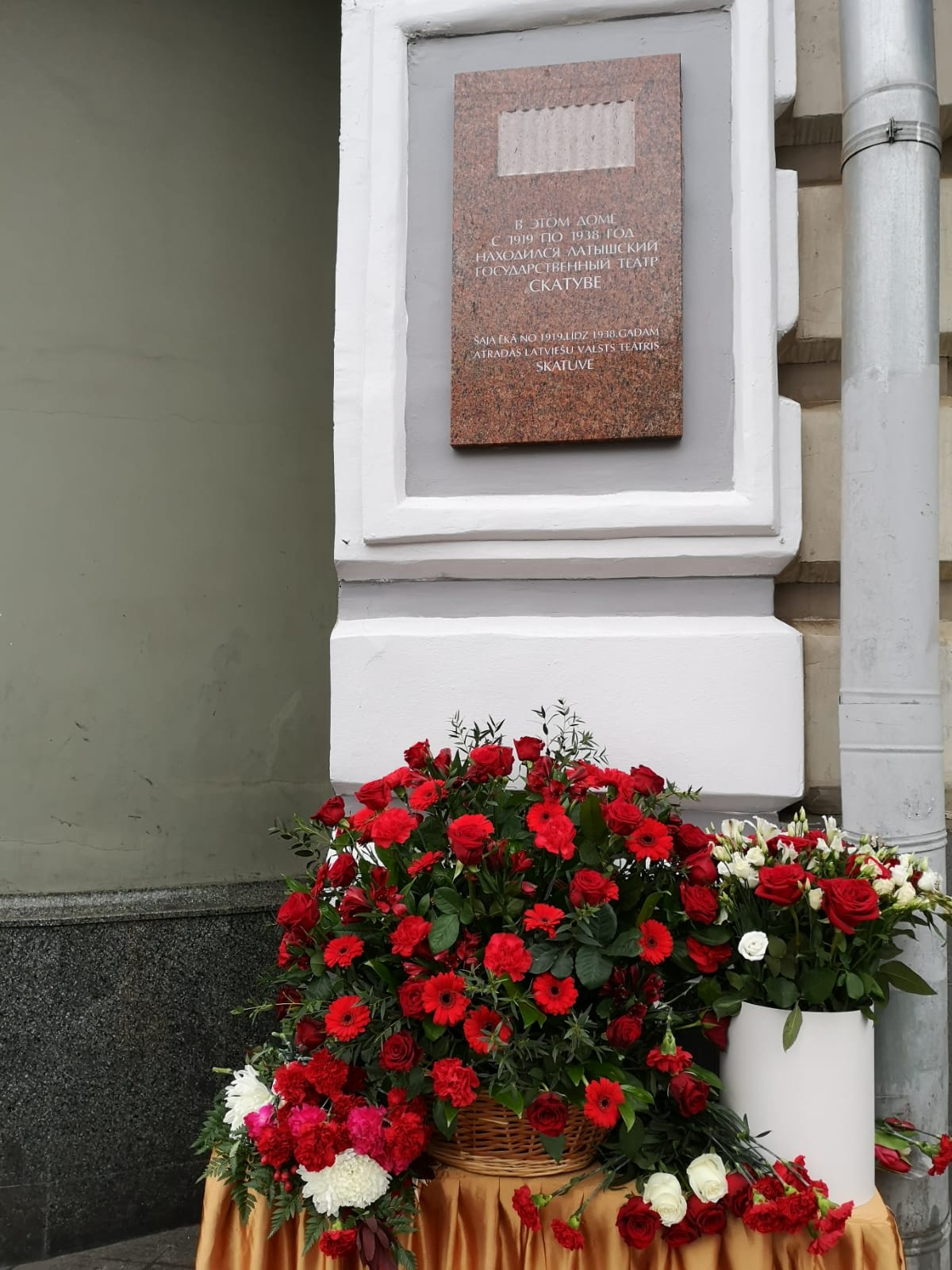
Plaque commemorating the Skatuve Moscow Latvian Theater and the Prometejs Society in Moscow, unveiled 2020
