= Nizhnyaya Bulanka =

Rural locality in Krasnoyarsk Krai, Russia

Coordinates: 53°20′59″N 92°42′25″E

Nizhnyaya Bulanka (Russian: Ни́жняя Була́нка; Latvian: Lejas Bulāna) is a rural locality (a selo) in the Karatuzsky District in Krasnoyarsk Krai, Russia. Population: 83 (2010 census);
