= House of S. I. Elagin =

Historic mansion in Moscow

- Дом С. И. Елагина (Russian)
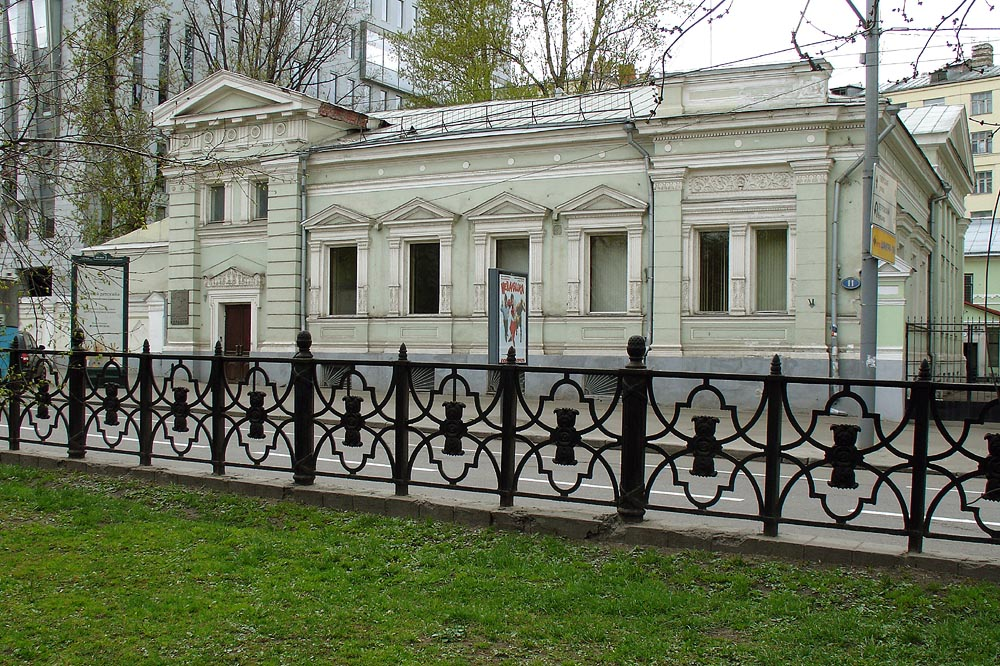
- Interactive map of the House of S. I. Elagin area

General information
- Location: Moscow, Strastnoy Boulevard, house 11
- Coordinates: 55°46′03″N 37°36′34″E
- Construction started: 1898
- Completed: 1898

Design and construction
- Architect: A. A. Dranitsyn

The house of S. I. Elagin (Russian: Дом С. И. Елагина) is a late-19th century mansion in Moscow on the Boulevard Ring (Strastnoy Boulevard, house 11). It has the status of an identified cultural heritage site.

== History ==
The house of the hereditary honorable citizen Sergei Ivanovich Yelagin was built in 1898 by the architect A. A. Dranitsyn. In 1910, an extension was made from the side of the courtyard according to the design of the architect O. O. Shishkovsky.

In the 1920–1930s, the mansion contained the editorial office of the magazine "Ogonyok". At that time there were Vladimir Mayakovsky, Demyan Bedny, Ilf and Petrov, Vladimir Gilyarovsky. In the garden of the mansion, there was a summer restaurant "Jurgaz", popular with journalists and writers. It became one of the prototypes of the Griboyedov restaurant in the Mikhail Bulgakov novel "Master and Margarita". In memory of the chief editor of the magazine, "Ogonyok" M. E. Koltsov, a memorial plaque was erected on the facade of the house.

In the post-war years, the Sverdlovsk regional executive committee was located in the mansion, then the Institute of Party History at the CPSU MKU, and then the regional committee of people's control.

In 2015, there was a project of "regeneration" of the house of S. I. Elagin. It provided for the construction of a five-storey hotel complex on the site of a garden with a multi-level underground parking lot and completion of a mansion in a pseudo-historic style.

== Architecture ==
The one-story mansion with a basement and mezzanines (in the yard) is built in the Neo-Greek style. The asymmetrical facade is decorated with palmettes and lion masks. Partially preserved interiors are of the late 19th to early 20th century.
