= Yuri Rakhmaninov =

Soviet and Russian scientist and engineer

Yuri Pavlovich Rachmaninov (Russian: Ю́рий Па́влович Рахма́нинов; 20 July 1936, Moscow – 18 June 2007, Moscow) was a Soviet and Russian scientist and engineer. He was the great-nephew of Russian composer Sergei Rachmaninoff.
